= Shirley Bassey discography =

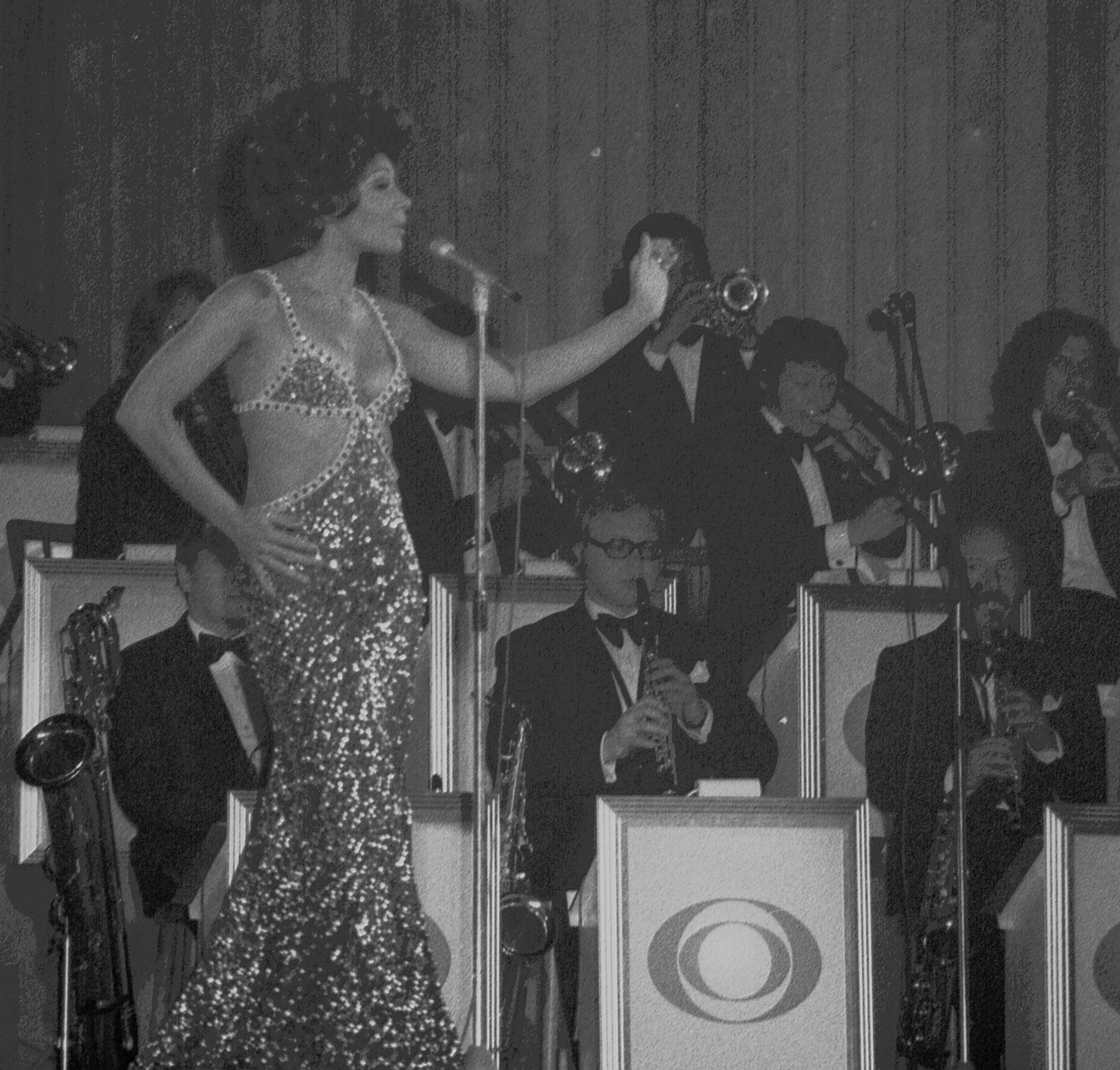
- Bassey performing in 1973
- Studio albums: 34
- Extended plays: 22
- Live albums: 7
- Compilation albums: 25
- Singles: 98
- Remix albums: 2
- Repackaged albums: 4

The discography of Shirley Bassey includes 41 main albums (7 of them live), 25 compilation albums, and 98 singles. Bassey's biggest selling solo albums are The Shirley Bassey Singles Album, peaking at number two and earning a gold disc, and the limited edition double album, Shirley Bassey 25th Anniversary Album, a platinum record charting at number three in 1978 on the UK Albums Chart. Her Top 10 album Something is her biggest-selling studio album, remaining in the UK Albums Chart for five months. In 2020, the album I Owe It All to You entered the UK Top 5, and Bassey became “the first female artist to claim a Top 40 album in seven consecutive decades.”

Bassey has two number one UK singles to her credit: "As I Love You" and the double A-sided, "Reach for the Stars" / "Climb Ev'ry Mountain", as well as a number one on the dance chart; "History Repeating" in 1997. She reached the top spot on the Australian and South African charts with 1973's "Never, Never, Never". In 1999, Dame Shirley recorded the lead tracks for the Land of My Fathers album which reached number one on the UK Compilation Chart. On the release of "The Living Tree" in 2007, she marked a 50-year span of appearances in the UK Singles Chart.

Bassey's highest-peaking single in the US is "Goldfinger", peaking at number eight on the Billboard Hot 100 and appearing on the number one soundtrack album from the 1964 James Bond film. Although her only solo album to enter the Top 20 of a US chart (R&B) is Live at Carnegie Hall, she has enjoyed five Top 10 singles on US charts over the decades: "Goldfinger" (Billboard Hot 100 Top 10); "Something"; "Never, Never, Never"; "History Repeating" and "Get the Party Started".

== Albums ==
=== Studio albums ===
Title	Album details	Peak chart positions									UK certifications
Title	Album details	UK	AUS	GER	JPN	NL	NOR	NZ	US	US R&B	UK certifications
Born to Sing the Blues	Released: 1958; Label: Philips; Formats: LP	—	—	—	—	—	—	—	—	—	
The Bewitching Miss Bassey	Released: June 1959; Label: Philips; Formats: LP	—	—	—	—	—	—	—	—	—	
The Fabulous Shirley Bassey	Released: October 1959; Label: Columbia; Formats: LP	12 (Note: Did not chart until 1961.)	—	—	—	—	—	—	—	—	
Shirley	Released: February 1961; Label: Columbia; Formats: LP	9	—	—	—	—	—	—	—	—	
Shirley Bassey	Released: January 1962; Label: Columbia; Formats: LP	14	—	—	—	—	—	—	—	—	
Let's Face the Music	Released: November 1962; Label: Columbia; Formats: LP; Released in North America as Shirley Bassey Sings the Hit Song from "Oliver!"	12	—	—	—	—	—	—	—	—	
Shirley Stops the Shows	Released: January 1965; Label: Columbia; Formats: LP, reel-to-reel; Released in North America as Shirley Bassey Belts the Best!	—	—	—	—	—	—	—	85	—	
I've Got a Song for You	Released: August 1966; Label: United Artists; Formats: LP, reel-to-reel; Released in North America & Australia as Shirley Means Bassey	26	—	—	—	—	—	—	—	—	
And We Were Lovers	Released: April 1967; Label: United Artists; Formats: LP, reel-to-reel	—	—	—	—	—	—	—	—	—	
12 of Those Songs	Released: February 1968; Label: Columbia; Formats: LP, MC	38	—	—	—		—	—	—	—	
This Is My Life	Released: October 1968; Label: United Artists; Formats: LP; A different version titled This Is My Life (La vita) was released in Italy	—	—	—	—	—	—	—	—	—	
Does Anybody Miss Me	Released: August 1969; Label: United Artists; Formats: LP	—	—	—	—	—	—	—	—	—	
Something	Released: August 1970; Label: United Artists; Formats: LP, MC, 8-track; Released in North America as Shirley Bassey Is Really "Something"	5	17	—	—	—	20	—	105	29	
Something Else	Released: May 1971; Label: United Artists; Formats: LP, MC, 8-track	7	—	—	—	—	—	—	123	—	
I, Capricorn	Released: February 1972; Label: United Artists; Formats: LP, MC, 8-track	13	—	—	—	—	—	—	94	—	
And I Love You So	Released: October 1972; Label: United Artists; Formats: LP, MC, 8-track	24	—	—	—	—	—	—	171	—	
Never, Never, Never	Released: May 1973; Label: United Artists; Formats: LP, MC, 8-track	10	4	—	—	—	—	—	60	34	Silver
Nobody Does It Like Me	Released: August 1974; Label: United Artists; Formats: LP, MC, 8-track	—	93	—	79	—	—	—	142	—	
Good, Bad but Beautiful	Released: 17 October 1975; Label: United Artists; Formats: LP, MC, 8-track	13	66	—	—	—	—	—	186	54	Silver
Love, Life and Feelings	Released: May 1976; Label: United Artists; Formats: LP, MC, 8-track	13	99	—	—	—	—	—	149	—	Silver
You Take My Heart Away	Released: June 1977; Label: United Artists; Formats: LP, MC, 8-track	34	—	—	—	—	—	—	—	—	
Yesterdays	Released: March 1978; Label: United Artists; Formats: LP, MC, 8-track	—	—	—	—	—	—	—	—	—	
The Magic Is You	Released: January 1979; Label: United Artists; Formats: LP, MC, 8-track	40	—	—	—	23	—	—	—	—	
All by Myself	Released: June 1982; Label: United Artists; Formats: LP, MC, 8-track; Released everywhere else as All by Myself	48	—	—	—	—	—	—	—	—	
I Am What I Am	Released: October 1984; Label: Towerbell; Formats: CD, LP, MC	25	46	39	—	—	—	—	—	—	Gold
La Mujer	Released: 6 June 1989; Label: Mercury; Formats: CD, LP, MC	—	—	—	—	—	—	—	—	—	
Keep the Music Playing	Released: 7 May 1991; Label: Freestyle; Formats: CD, LP, MC	25	—	—	—	—	—	21	—	—	
The Bond Collection	Released: September 1992; Label: Icon Music; Formats: CD, MC	—	—	—	—	—	—	—	—	—	
Sings the Songs of Andrew Lloyd Webber	Released: 22 November 1993; Label: Music for Pleasure; Formats: CD, MC	34	—	—	—	—	—	—	—	—	
Sings the Movies	Released: 30 October 1995; Label: PolyGram TV; Formats: CD, MC	24	—	94	—	—	—	—	—	—	Gold
The Show Must Go On	Released: 28 October 1996; Label: PolyGram TV; Formats: CD, MC	47	—	—	—	—	—	—	—	—	Silver
The Performance	Released: 9 November 2009; Label: Geffen; Formats: CD, digital download	20	—	81	—	—	—	—	—	—	Gold
Hello Like Before	Released: 17 November 2014; Label: RCA Victor; Formats: CD, LP, digital download	24	—	—	—	—	—	—	—	—	
I Owe It All to You	Released: 6 November 2020; Label: Decca; Formats: CD, digital download	5	—	84	—	—	—	—	—	—	
"—" denotes releases that did not chart or were not released in that territory.

=== Live albums ===
Title	Album details	Peak chart positions			
Title	Album details	UK	JPN	US	US R&B
Shirley Bassey at the Pigalle	Released: November 1965; Label: Columbia; Formats: LP, reel-to-reel; Released in North America as Shirley Bassey in Person	15	—	—	—
Live at Talk of the Town	Released: June 1970; Label: United Artists; Formats: LP, MC, 8-track	38	—	—	—
Live at Carnegie Hall	Released: August 1973; Label: United Artists; Formats: 2xLP, 2xMC, 2x8-track, reel-to-reel	—	—	136	20
Live in Japan	Released: October 1974; Label: United Artists; Formats: 2xLP; Japan-only release	—	63	—	—
Live in Japan '77	Released: 1978; Label: United Artists; Formats: 2xLP; Japan-only release	—	—	—	—
10,000 Voices II	Released: 1993; Label: EMI; Formats: LP, MC	—	—	—	—
The Birthday Concert	Released: July 1998; Label: Artful; Formats: LP, MC	—	—	—	—
"—" denotes releases that did not chart or were not released in that territory.

=== Cast recording albums ===
Title	Album details
Show Boat	Released: 1959; Label: His Master's Voice; Formats: LP; Various artists; includes two songs by Bassey

=== Remix albums ===
Title	Album details	Peak chart positions					UK certifications
Title	Album details	UK	FRA	GER	IT	SWI	UK certifications
The Remix Album...Diamonds Are Forever	Released: 28 August 2000; Label: EMI; Formats: CD, 2xLP, MC	62	48	63	24	86	
Get the Party Started	Released: 25 June 2007; Label: Lock Stock and Barrel; Formats: CD, digital download; Includes several new songs	6	—	—	—	—	Silver
"—" denotes releases that did not chart or were not released in that territory.

=== Compilation albums ===
Title	Album details	Peak chart positions					UK certifications
Title	Album details	UK	AUS	JPN	NL	NZ	UK certifications
Golden Hits of Shirley Bassey	Released: November 1968; Label: Columbia; Formats: LP, reel-to-reel	28 (Note: Did not reach its peak position until 1970.)	—	—	—	—	
It's Magic	Released: October 1971; Label: Starline; Formats: LP	32	—	—	—	—	
The Fabulous Shirley Bassey	Released: October 1971; Label: Music for Pleasure; Formats: LP	48	—	—	—	—	
The Shirley Bassey Collection	Released: December 1971; Label: United Artists; Formats: 2xLP	37	—	63	—	7	
The Very Best of Shirley Bassey	Released: October 1974; Label: Columbia; Formats: LP, MC	—	—	—	—	—	Silver
The Shirley Bassey Singles Album	Released: 28 February 1975; Label: United Artists; Formats: LP, MC, 8-track	2	34	—	—	—	Gold
The Shirley Bassey Collection Vol. II	Released: 1975; Label: United Artists; Formats: 2xLP	—	—	—	—	—	
Shirley Bassey	Released: June 1976; Label: Contour; Formats: LP, MC	—	—	—	—	—	Silver
Thoughts of Love	Released: November 1976; Label: United Artists; Formats: LP, MC, 8-track	15	—	—	—	—	Gold
25th Anniversary Album	Release date: 13 October 1978; Label: United Artists; Formats: 2xLP, MC	3	—	—	—	—	Platinum
What I Did for Love	Release date: October 1979; Label: United Artists; Formats: LP, MC	—	—	—	—	—	
This Is My Life - Shirley Bassey's 20 Greatest Hits	Release date: March 1980; Label: Arcade Records (Nederland) B.V.; Formats: LP, MC; Netherlands-only release	—	—	—	29	—	
Diamonds: The Best of Shirley Bassey	Release date: 16 May 1988; Label: EMI; Formats: CD	—	—	—	—	—	
The Best of Shirley Bassey	Release date: 23 November 1992; Label: Dino; Formats: CD, MC	27	—	—	—	—	
Bassey – The EMI/UA Years 1959–1979	Release date: 14 November 1994; Label: EMI; Formats: 5xCD	—	—	—	—	—	
The Best of Shirley Bassey	Release date: November 1995; Label: Music for Pleasure; Formats: CD, MC	—	—	—	—	—	Silver
20 of the Best	Release date: 19 August 1996; Label: Music for Pleasure; Formats: CD, MC	—	—	—	—	—	Gold
Four Decades of Song	Release date: December 1996; Label: Music for Pleasure; Formats: 3xCD	—	—	—	—	—	
The Diamond Collection – Greatest Hits 1958–1998	Release date: 5 October 1998; Label: Artful; Formats: 2xCD, 2xMC	—	—	—	—	—	
The Greatest Hits – This Is My Life	Release date: 13 November 2000; Label: Liberty; Formats: CD, MC	54	—	—	—	—	Gold
Het beste van	Release date: April 2003; Label: EMI; Formats: CD; Netherlands-only release	—	—	—	64	—	
Thank You for the Years	Release date: May 2003; Label: Sony Music TV; Formats: CD; Includes several new tracks	19	40	—	—	—	Silver
The Complete EMI Columbia Singles Collection	Release date: 2 May 2006; Label: EMI Gold; Formats: 2xCD	—	—	—	—	—	
Burn My Candle – The Complete Early Years 1956–58	Release date: 23 February 2009; Label: Fantastic Voyage; Formats: 2xCD	—	—	—	—	—	
The Definitive Collection 1956–62	Release date: 10 March 2017; Label: Acrobat Music; Formats: 5xCD	—	—	—	—	—	
"—" denotes releases that did not chart or were not released in that territory.

=== Repackaged albums ===
Title	Album details	Peak chart positions	UK certifications
Title	Album details	UK	UK certifications
In the Still of the Night	Released: November 1969; Label: Starline; Formats: LP; Repackaging of Shirley	—	
Big Spender	Released: September 1971; Label: Sunset; Formats: LP, MC; Repackaging of And We Were Lovers	27	
What Now My Love	Released: November 1971; Label: Music for Pleasure; Formats: LP, MC; Repackaging of Let's Face the Music	17	
The Singles	Released: 26 September 1988; Label: Music for Pleasure; Formats: CD, MC; Repackaging of The Shirley Bassey Singles Album	—	Silver
"—" denotes releases that did not chart.

== EPs ==
Title	EP details	Peak chart positions
Title	EP details	UK
Shirley Bassey at the Café de Paris, London	Released: March 1957; Label: Philips; Formats: 7"	—
As I Love You	Released: November 1958; Label: Philips; Formats: 7"	—
Blues by Bassey	Released: March 1959; Label: Philips; Formats: 7"	—
Love for Sale	Released: January 1960; Label: Philips; Formats: 7"	—
The Fabulous Shirley Bassey	Released: August 1960; Label: Columbia; Formats: 7"	5
As Long as He Needs Me	Released: December 1960; Label: Columbia; Formats: 7"	3
Blues by Bassey No. 2	Released: January 1961; Label: Philips; Formats: 7"	—
The Fabulous Shirley Bassey No. 2	Released: February 1961; Label: Columbia; Formats: 7"	15
Shirley	Released: August 1961; Label: Columbia; Formats: 7"	—
Shirley No. 2	Released: October 1961; Label: Columbia; Formats: 7"	15
Shirley No. 3	Released: April 1962; Label: Columbia; Formats: 7"	—
Shirley Bassey	Released: May 1962; Label: Columbia; Formats: 7"	—
Till and Other Great Songs	Released: November 1962; Label: Columbia; Formats: 7"	—
Shirley Bassey No. 2	Released: 1 March 1963; Label: Columbia; Formats: 7"	—
The Hits of Shirley Bassey	Released: June 1963; Label: Columbia; Formats: 7"	—
In Other Words	Released: July 1963; Label: Columbia; Formats: 7"	—
Let's Face the Music	Released: November 1963; Label: Columbia; Formats: 7"	—
I (Who Have Nothing)	Released: February 1964; Label: Columbia; Formats: 7"	—
Shirley's Most Requested Songs	Released: April 1964; Label: Columbia; Formats: 7"	—
The Dynamic Shirley Bassey	Released: November 1964; Label: Columbia; Formats: 7"	15
Let's Face the Music No. 2	Released: April 1965; Label: Columbia; Formats: 7"	—
Shirley Stops the Shows	Released: September 1965; Label: Columbia; Formats: 7"	—
"—" denotes releases that did not chart.

== Singles ==
Single (A-side, B-side)	Year	Peak chart positions										Album
Single (A-side, B-side)	Year	UK	AUS	BEL (FL)	GER	IRE	IT	NL	NOR	US	US AC	Album
"Burn My Candle" b/w "Stormy Weather"	1956	—	—	—	—	—	—	—	—	—	—	Non-album single
"The Wayward Wind" b/w "Born to Sing the Blues"	1956	—	—	—	—	—	—	—	—	—	—	Non-album single Born to Sing the Blues
"After the Lights Go Down Low" b/w "If You Don't Love Me"	1956	—	—	—	—	—	—	—	—	—	—	Non-album singles
"The Banana Boat Song" b/w "Tra La La"	1957	8	—	—	—	—	—	—	—	—	—	Non-album singles
"If I Had a Needle and Thread" b/w "Tonight My Heart She Is Crying"	1957	—	—	—	—	—	—	—	—	—	—	Non-album singles
"You, You Romeo" b/w "Fire Down Below"	1957	29; 30	—	—	—	—	—	—	—	—	—	Non-album singles
"Puh-Leeze! Mister Brown (Mister Jones, Mister Smith)" b/w "Take My Love, Take My Love"	1957	—	—	—	—	—	—	—	—	—	—	Non-album singles
"Hands Across the Sea" (Note: "Hands Across the Sea" was originally released as the A-side in August 1958, before the sides were flipped several months later when the B-side became more commercially successful.) b/w "As I Love You"	1958	— 1	—	—	—	— 5	—	—	—	—	—	Non-album single The Bewitching Miss Bassey
"Kiss Me, Honey Honey, Kiss Me" b/w "There's Never Been a Night"	1958	3	34	—	—	6	—	—	6	—	—	The Bewitching Miss Bassey Non-album track
"Love for Sale" b/w "Crazy Rhythm"	1959	—	—	—	—	—	—	—	—	—	—	The Bewitching Miss Bassey
"My Funny Valentine" b/w "How About You?"	1959	—	—	—	—	—	—	—	—	—	—	The Bewitching Miss Bassey
"If You Love Me" b/w "Count On Me"	1959	—	—	—	—	—	—	—	—	—	—	Non-album single
"Night and Day" b/w "The Gypsy in My Soul"	1959	—	—	—	—	—	—	—	—	—	—	The Bewitching Miss Bassey
"With These Hands" b/w "The Party's Over"	1960	38	—	—	—	—	—	—	—	—	—	Non-album single The Fabulous Shirley Bassey
"As Long as He Needs Me" b/w "So in Love"	1960	2	16	—	—	—	—	—	—	—	—	Non-album single Shirley
"The Birth of the Blues" b/w "Careless Love Blues"	1960	—	—	—	—	—	—	—	—	—	—	Non-album singles
"You'll Never Know" b/w "Hold Me Tight"	1961	6	100	—	—	5	—	—	—	—	—	Non-album singles
"Reach for the Stars" b/w "Climb Ev'ry Mountain"	1961	1	83	—	—	3	—	—	—	120	—	Non-album singles Shirley Bassey
"I'll Get By (As Long as I Have You)" b/w "Who Are We?"	1961	10	64	—	—	—	—	—	—	—	—	Non-album singles Shirley Bassey
"Tonight" b/w "Let's Start All Over Again"	1962	21	—	—	—	—	—	—	—	—	—	Non-album singles
"Ave Maria" b/w "You'll Never Walk Alone"	1962	31	—	—	—	—	—	—	—	—	—	Non-album singles
"Far Away" b/w "My Faith"	1962	24	—	—	—	—	—	—	—	—	—	Non-album singles
"What Now My Love?" b/w "Above All Others"	1962	5	—	—	—	—	—	—	—	—	—	Let's Face the Music Non-album track
"What Kind of Fool Am I?" b/w "Till"	1963	47	38	—	—	—	—	—	—	—	—	Non-album single Shirley Bassey
"Where Shall I Find Him" (Note: "Where Shall I Find Him" was only released as a single in Australia.) b/w "It Might as Well Be Spring"	1963	—	—	—	—	—	—	—	—	—	—	Non-album singles
"I (Who Have Nothing)" b/w "How Can You Tell?"	1963	6	32	—	—	10	—	—	—	—	—	Non-album singles
"My Special Dream" b/w "You"	1964	32	—	—	—	—	—	—	—	—	—	Non-album singles
"Gone" b/w "Your Love"	1964	36	79	—	—	—	—	—	—	—	—	Non-album singles
"Who Can I Turn To?" b/w "To Be Love by a Man"	1964	—	47	—	—	—	—	—	—	—	—	Non-album singles
"Goldfinger" b/w "Strange How Love Can Be"	1964	21	4	9	8	—	2	5	7	8	2	Goldfinger (soundtrack) Non-album track
"Now" b/w "How Can You Believe"	1964	—	—	—	—	—	—	—	—	—	—	Non-album singles
"No Regrets" b/w "Seesaw of Dreams"	1965	39	—	—	—	—	—	—	—	—	—	Non-album singles
"It's Yourself" b/w "Secrets"	1965	—	—	—	—	—	—	—	—	—	38	Non-album singles
"The Liquidator" b/w "Sunshine"	1966	—	—	—	—	—	—	—	—	—	—	The Liquidator (soundtrack) Non-album track
"Don't Take the Lovers from the World" b/w "Take Away"	1966	—	65	—	—	—	—	—	—	—	—	Non-album single
"Who Could Love Me" b/w "Shirley"	1966	—	—	—	—	—	—	—	—	—	—	Non-album single I've Got a Song for You
"The Impossible Dream" b/w "Do I Look Like a Fool"	1967	—	—	—	—	—	—	—	—	—	—	And We Were Lovers Non-album tracks
"If You Go Away" b/w "Give Him Your Love"	1967	—	—	—	—	—	—	—	—	—	—	And We Were Lovers Non-album tracks
"Big Spender" b/w "Dangerous Game"	1967	21	—	—	—	—	—	—	—	—	—	And We Were Lovers Non-album tracks
"This Is My Life" b/w "Without a Word"	1968	55 (Note: Chart position is from the official UK "Breakers List".)	84	—	—	—	—	—	—	—	—	This Is My Life Non-album track
"Domani, domani" (Note: "Domani, domani" was only released as a single in Italy.) b/w "Pronto... sono io"	1968	—	—	—	—	—	—	—	—	—	—	This Is My Life (La vita)
"To Give" b/w "My Love Has Two Faces"	1968	—	—	—	—	—	—	—	—	—	—	This Is My Life Deadfall (soundtrack)
"Chi si vuol bene come noi..." (Note: "Chi si vuol bene come noi..." was only released as a single in Italy.) b/w "Epirops"	1969	—	—	—	—	—	19	—	—	—	—	This Is My Life (La vita)
"Does Anybody Miss Me" b/w "Now You Want to Be Loved"	1969	—	—	—	—	—	—	—	—	—	—	Does Anybody Miss Me This Is My Life
"Com'è piccolo il mondo" (Note: "Com'è piccolo il mondo" was only released as a single in Italy.) b/w "Softly as I Leave You"	1969	—	—	—	—	—	—	—	—	—	—	Non-album single This Is My Life
"Fa, Fa, Fa (Live for Today)" (Note: "Fa, Fa, Fa (Live for Today)" was only released as a single in the US, Australia, Germany and Portugal.) b/w "A Bus That Never Comes (A Train That Never Leaves)"	1969	—	—	—	—	—	—	—	—	—	—	Non-album single
"Concerto d'autunno" (Note: "Concerto d'autunno" was only released as a single in Italy.) b/w "(You Are) My Way of Life"	1970	—	—	—	—	—	—	—	—	—	—	Non-album single Does Anybody Miss Me
"Sea and Sand" b/w "What About Today?"	1970	—	—	—	—	—	—	—	—	—	—	Something
"Something" b/w "Easy to Be Hard"	1970	4	28	11	40	13	—	10	—	55	6	Something
"The Fool on the Hill" b/w "What Are You Doing the Rest of Your Life?"	1970	48	—	—	—	—	—	—	—	—	—	Non-album single Something
"(Where Do I Begin) Love Story" b/w "For the Love of Him"	1971	34	46	—	—	—	—	—	—	—	—	Something Else Non-album track
"Pieces of Dreams" (Note: "Pieces of Dreams" was only released as a single in the US and various other territories.) b/w "Breakfast in Bed"	1971	—	—	—	—	—	—	—	—	—	—	Something Else
"For All We Know" b/w "What's Done Is Done"	1971	6	—	—	—	20	—	—	—	—	—	Non-album single Something Else
"Diamonds Are Forever" b/w "Pieces of Dreams"	1971	38	—	—	—	—	—	—	—	57	14	Diamonds Are Forever (soundtrack) Something Else
"I've Never Been a Woman Before" b/w "The Greatest Performance of My Life"	1972	—	—	—	—	—	—	—	—	—	—	I, Capricorn
"Ballad of the Sad Young Men" b/w "If I Should Find Love Again"	1972	—	—	—	—	—	—	—	—	—	—	And I Love You So Non-album track
"And I Love You So" b/w "I Don't Know How to Love Him"	1972	—	—	—	—	—	—	—	—	—	—	And I Love You So
"Jezahel" (Note: "Jezahel" was only released as a single in the US, Germany and Brazil.) b/w "And I Love You So"	1972	—	—	—	—	—	—	—	—	—	—	And I Love You So
"Never, Never, Never" b/w "Day by Day"	1973	8	1	29	48	12	—	13	—	48	8	Never, Never, Never And I Love You So
"Make the World a Little Younger" b/w "The Old Fashioned Way"	1973	—	—	—	—	—	—	—	—	—	—	Never, Never, Never
"Davy" (Note: "Davy" was only released as a single in the US and Canada.) b/w "The Trouble with Hello Is Goodbye"	1974	—	—	—	—	—	—	—	—	—	44	Nobody Does It Like Me
"When You Smile" b/w "The Trouble with Hello Is Goodbye"	1974	—	—	—	—	—	—	—	—	—	—	Nobody Does It Like Me
"Yesterday When I Was Young" (live) (Note: "Yesterday When I Was Young" was only released as a single in Japan.) b/w "Goldfinger" (live)	1974	—	—	—	—	—	—	—	—	—	—	Live in Japan
"Good, Bad but Beautiful" b/w "I'm Nothing Without You"	1975	56	—	—	—	—	—	—	—	—	—	Good, Bad but Beautiful Nobody Does It Like You
"Living" b/w "Everything That Touches You"	1975	—	—	—	—	—	—	—	—	—	—	Good, Bad but Beautiful Love, Life and Feelings
"Sing" (Note: "Sing" was only released as a single in Spain.) b/w "All in Love Is Fair"	1975	—	—	—	—	—	—	—	—	—	—	Good, Bad but Beautiful
"Natali" b/w "Runaway"	1976	—	—	—	—	—	—	—	—	—	—	Love, Life and Feelings Non-album track
"If I Never Sing Another Song" (Note: "If I Never Sing Another Song" was only released as a single in the US, Portugal and Japan.) b/w "Everything That Touches You"	1976	—	—	—	—	—	—	—	—	—	—	Love, Life and Feelings
"Can't Take My Eyes Off You" b/w "Born to Lose"	1976	—	—	—	—	—	—	—	—	—	—	Non-album single Love, Life and Feelings
"Feelings" (Note: "Feelings" was only released as a single in the US, Japan and Yugoslavia.) b/w "What I Did for Love"	1976	—	—	—	—	—	—	—	—	—	—	Love, Life and Feelings
"I Let You Let Me Down Again" b/w "Razzle Dazzle"	1977	—	—	—	—	—	—	—	—	—	—	You Take My Heart Away Non-album track
"You Take My Heart Away" b/w "I Let You Let Me Down Again"	1977	—	—	—	—	—	—	—	—	—	—	You Take My Heart Away
"I've Got You Under My Skin" (Note: "I've Got You Under My Skin" was only released as a single in New Zealand.) b/w "I Only Have Eyes for You"	1978	—	—	—	—	—	—	—	—	—	—	Yesterdays
"This Is My Life" (re-recording) b/w "The Magic Is You"	1979	—	—	5	—	—	—	5	—	—	—	The Magic Is You
"Moonraker" (End Title) b/w "Moonraker" (Main Title)	1979	—	—	—	—	—	—	—	—	—	—	Moonraker (soundtrack)
"All by Myself" b/w "We Don't Cry Out Loud"	1982	—	—	—	—	—	—	—	—	—	—	All by Myself
"Thought I'd Ring You" (with Alain Delon) (Note: "Thought I'd Ring You" was only released as a single in Continental Europe and Canada.) b/w "Thought I'd Ring You" (Instrumental)	1983	—	—	13	—	—	—	13	—	—	—	Non-album singles
"That's Right" (Note: "That's Right" was only released as a single in Belgium.) b/w "Memory"	1983	—	—	16	—	—	—	—	—	—	—	Non-album singles
"Sometimes" b/w "He Needs Me"	1984	86	—	—	—	—	—	—	—	—	—	Non-album singles
"Remember" (with Al Corley) (Note: "Remember" was only released as a single in the Netherlands and Belgium.) b/w "Memory"	1984	—	—	—	—	—	—	—	—	—	—	Non-album singles
"If You Don't Understand" (Note: "If You Don't Understand" was only released as a single in Continental Europe.) b/w "To All the Men I've Loved Before"	1984	—	—	—	—	—	—	—	—	—	—	Non-album singles
"Natalie" (re-recording) b/w "As I Love You" (re-recording)	1984	—	—	—	—	—	—	—	—	—	—	I Am What I Am
"I Am What I Am" b/w "This Is My Life" (re-recording)	1984	—	—	—	—	—	—	—	—	—	—	I Am What I Am
"To All the Men I've Loved Before" b/w "I Am What I Am"	1986	86	—	—	—	—	—	—	—	—	—	Non-album singles
"There's No Place Like London" b/w "Born to Sing"	1986	138	—	—	—	—	—	—	—	—	—	Non-album singles
"The Rhythm Divine" (Yello featuring Shirley Bassey) b/w "Dr. Van Steiner" (by Yello)	1987	54	—	17	47	—	—	24	—	—	—	One Second (by Yello)
"Love Is No Game" (Note: "Love Is No Game" was only released as a single in Continental Europe.) b/w "Memory"	1988	—	—	—	—	—	—	—	—	—	—	Non-album single
"Sin ti" (Note: "Sin ti" was only released as a single in the US.) b/w "Hoy no tengo nada"	1989	—	—	—	—	—	—	—	—	—	—	La Mujer
"How Do You Keep the Music Playing" b/w "Greatest Love of All"	1991	—	—	—	—	—	—	—	—	—	—	Keep the Music Playing The Power of Love
"He Kills Everything You Love" (Note: "He Kills Everything You Love" was only released as a single in Germany.)	1996	—	—	—	—	—	—	—	—	—	—	The Show Must Go On
"'Disco' La Passione" (with Chris Rea)	1996	41	—	36	—	—	—	21	—	—	—	La Passione (soundtrack)
"History Repeating" (Propellerheads featuring Shirley Bassey)	1997	19	55	—	65	—	8	52	—	—	—	Decksandrumsandrockandroll (by Propellerheads)
"Light My Fire" (Shirley Bassey meets Booster) (Note: "Light My Fire" was only released as a single in Continental Europe.)	1999	—	—	—	—	—	—	—	—	—	—	Non-album single
"World in Union" (with Bryn Terfel)	1999	35	—	—	—	—	—	—	—	—	—	Land of My Fathers (various artists)
"Where Do I Begin" (awayTEAM remix)	2000	100	—	—	—	—	—	—	—	—	—	The Remix Album...Diamonds Are Forever
"The Living Tree"	2007	37	—	—	—	—	—	—	—	—	—	Get the Party Started
"Get the Party Started"	2007	47	—	—	—	—	—	—	—	—	—	Get the Party Started
"We Got Music" (with Dario G)	2014	—	—	—	—	—	—	—	—	—	—	Non-album single
"—" denotes releases that did not chart or were not released in that territory.

== Original soundtrack recordings ==
Year	Song	Movie
1964	"Goldfinger"	Goldfinger
1965	"The Liquidator"	The Liquidator
1965	"The Liquidator" (alternative version)	The Liquidator
1965	"My Liquidator"	The Liquidator
1968	"My Love has Two Faces"	Deadfall
1971	"Diamonds are Forever"	Diamonds are Forever
1971	"Una cascata di diamanti" (Italian release only)	Diamonds are Forever
1979	"Moonraker"	Moonraker
1979	"Moonraker" (End Title)	Moonraker
1996	"'Disco' La Passione"	La Passione
1996	"Shirley, Do You Own a Ferrari?" (duet with Chris Rea)	La Passione
2012	"Guardian of the Highlands"	Sir Billi
