= Bassey – The EMI/UA Years 1959–1979 =

Box set by Shirley Bassey
- Released: 14 November 1994
- Recorded: 1959–1979
- Genre: Vocal / MOR
- Label: EMI
- Producer: Various

Alternative cover

Professional ratings
Review scores
Source	Rating
Allmusic	4.5/5 stars

Bassey – The EMI/UA Years 1959–1979 is a 5-CD boxset compilation from Shirley Bassey issued in 1994, this set features 94 studio recordings on four CDs, recorded for EMI/United Artists between 1959 and 1979. Disc five features a previously unreleased live recording from Carnegie Hall. The boxset was reissued by EMI in 2010 in a standard jewel case set.

All tracks appear here in stereo, the original singles released between 1959 and 1969 were released in mono. Later re-issues on compilations were stereo versions of the mono singles, these are the versions featured here. Original mono single recordings made for EMI Columbia were re-issued in 2006 on the 2-CD set The Complete EMI/Columbia Singles Collection. It was not unusual in this era to make a recording twice, as recording methods for mono and stereo were very different. This created two recordings of the same song, with differing vocals and instrumentation. Both versions were released on separate albums, making two versions of an album available. Mono albums were less expensive and it took a few years before stereo became the dominant market. Later all recordings were made in stereo but were mixed to mono for single releases.

Several previously unreleased tracks were discovered in the EMI vaults and made available here for the first time. This box covers extensively Shirley Bassey's career from the late 1950s through to the late 1970s, from traditional pop to disco. All three of her world-famous James Bond themes are represented here, as are many rare single and EP only releases. Many of the tracks here had not been available in any form since the original release on vinyl. None of Bassey's live albums recorded in this period are represented on this release. Two B-sides were omitted: The 1976 B-side of "Natalie", a track titled "Runaway" (Shapiro, Lovecchio) (an Italian original), and the other was a 1979 cover of Barry Manilow's "Copacabana (At The Copa)" (Manilow, Sussman, Feldman) which only appeared on the 1979 single "This Is my Life". These two tracks are the only ones, originally released in the UK during the EMI/UA Years, not to have had a digital re-issue, as of October 2009.

A fifth disc features a previously unreleased live recording made on 15 February 1964 at Carnegie Hall, New York. Planned for an album release, this performance was recorded live on a three track tape and was originally mixed for Mono. Due to limitations of the period the results were found unsatisfactory. In 1994 while this boxset was being planned the tapes were discovered and mixed for Stereo at Abbey Road, London. The recording represents well the experience of an early Shirley Bassey concert, highlighting some of her earliest recordings at her previous label (Philips) and showcasing a selection of her newest recordings taken from her first three albums at EMI/Columbia. Some of the performances found here are the only live recordings of several Bassey tracks. Her concert performances changed a great deal in the next few years. By the time she finally released Shirley Bassey at the Pigalle in 1965 her early recordings were no longer part of the set list. The song "Typically English" was never recorded in a studio version. Musical Direction on the original live recording was by Tony Osborne, and remixed for EMI by Tristam Penna and Ashley Alexander in September 1994.

== Track listing ==
=== CD One. Bassey – The EMI/UA Years Vol.1 1959–1966 ===
1. "S'Wonderful" (George Gershwin, Ira Gershwin) (Taken from the 1959 album The Fabulous Shirley Bassey)
2. "As Long as He Needs Me" (Lionel Bart) (1960 single A-side in stereo)
3. "You'll Never Know" (Harry Warren, Mack Gordon) (1961 single A-side in stereo)
4. "So in Love" (Cole Porter) (Taken from the 1961 album Shirley)
5. "Reach for the Stars" (David West, Udo Jürgens) (1961 single double A-side in stereo)
6. "Who Are We?" (Washington, Livingston) (Taken from the 1961 album Shirley Bassey)
7. "I'll Get By (As Long as I Have You)" (Roy Turk, Fred Ahlert) (1961 single A-side in stereo)
8. "Tonight" (Leonard Bernstein, Stephen Sondheim) (1961 single A-side in stereo)
9. "What Now My Love" (Gilbert Bécaud, Pierre Leroyer, Carl Sigman) (Taken from the 1962 album Let's Face the Music)
10. "Above all Things" (Phillip Green, John Moran) (1961 single B-side in stereo)
11. "It Could Happen to You" (Johnny Burke, Jimmy Van Heusen) (Previously unreleased, recorded 23 January 1962)
12. "It all Depends on You" (deSylva, Brown, Henderson) (Previously unreleased, recorded 23 May 1962)
13. "I (Who Have Nothing)" (Mogol, Donida, Jerry Leiber and Mike Stoller) (1963 single A-side in stereo)
14. "Gone" (Tony Osborne, Lally) (1964 single A-side in stereo)
15. "How Can you Believe" (Alma Cook) (1964 single A-side in stereo)
16. "Goldfinger" (Leslie Bricusse, Anthony Newley, John Barry) (1964 single A-side in stereo/soundtrack album track)
17. "My Child" (Lewis, Black) (Previously unreleased, recorded 12 May 1964)
18. "Seesaw of Dreams" (Giampiero Roland, Nello Segurini) (1965 single B-side in stereo)
19. "It's Yourself" (Lionel Bart) (1965 single A-side in stereo)
20. "Secrets" (Pat Napper) (1965 single B-side in stereo)
21. "Stay on the Island" (Fahey, Norman Newell) (Previously unreleased, recorded March 1965)
22. "Once in a Lifetime" (Anthony Newley, Leslie Bricusse) (Taken from the 1965 album Shirley Stops the Shows)
23. "The Liquidator" (Peter Callander, Lalo Schifrin) (1965 single A-side in stereo)
24. "Mr Kiss Kiss Bang Bang" (John Barry, Leslie Bricusse) (Unreleased until 1992)
25. "The Boy from Ipanema" (Jobim, d'Moraes, Gimbel) (Previously unreleased, recorded 9 and 14 March 1966)
26. "More" (Olivero, Otolani, Norman Newell) (Previously unreleased, recorded March 1966)
27. "A House Is Not a Home" (Burt Bacharach, Hal David) (Taken from the 1968 album 12 Of Those Songs)

=== CD Two. Bassey – The EMI/UA Years Vol.2 1966–1969 ===
1. "Don't Take The Lovers From The World" (Hugo Peretti, Luigi Creatore, George David Weiss) (1966 single A-side in stereo)
2. "Take Away" (Horan, King) (1966 single B-side in stereo)
3. "I've Got A Song For You", (Al Stillman, LeRoy Holmes) (Taken from the 1966 album I've Got a Song for You)
4. "Shirley" (Al Stillman, LeRoy Holmes) (Taken from the 1966 album I've Got a Song for You)
5. "Give Him Your Love" (King, Lewis) (1967 single B-side in stereo)
6. "And We Were Lovers" (Jerry Goldsmith, Leslie Bricusse) (Taken from the 1967 album And We Were Lovers)
7. "Who Could Love Me" (Bruno Canfora, Antonio Amum, David) (1967 single B-side in stereo)
8. "Do I Look Like A Fool" (King, Lewis) (1967 single B-side in stereo)
9. "Big Spender" (Cy Coleman, Dorothy Fields) (Taken from the 1967 album And We Were Lovers)
10. "Dangerous Games" (Mason, Miller) (1967 single B-side in stereo)
11. "La vita" (Bruno Canfora, Antonio Amurri) (Taken from the 1968 Italian album This Is My Life (La vita))
12. "I Must Know" (Neal Hefti, Lil Mattis) (Taken from the 1968 album This Is My Life)
13. "This Is My Life" (Norman Newell, Bruno Canfora, Antonio Amurri) (Taken from the 1968 album This Is My Life)
14. "Without A Word" (Zafransky, Cohn) (1968 single B-side in stereo)
15. "If He Walked Into My Life" (Herman) (Previously unreleased, recorded 14 January 1968)
16. "To Give" (Bob Crewe, Bob Gaudio) (1968 single A-side in stereo)
17. "My Love Has Two Faces" (John Barry, Lawence) (1968 single B-side in stereo/soundtrack album track)
18. "Clown Town" (Previously unreleased, recorded 14 January 1968)
19. "Does Anybody Miss Me" (Reed, Johnny Worth) (Taken from the 1968 album Does Anybody Miss Me)
20. "I'll Never Fall in Love Again" (Burt Bacharach, Hal David) (Taken from the 1968 album Does Anybody Miss Me)
21. "(You Are) My Way Of Life" (Bert Kaempfert, Sigman, Rehbein) (Taken from the 1968 album Does Anybody Miss Me)
22. "The Bus That Never Comes" (uncredited) (1968 single B-side in Stereo)
23. "Fa Fa Fa (Live For Today)" (Cavallero, Gold, Stanton, Badalo) (1968 single A-side in stereo)

=== CD Three. Bassey – The EMI/UA Years Vol.3 1970–1972 ===
1. "Something" (George Harrison) (Taken from the 1970 album Something)
2. "Spinning Wheel" (David Clayton-Thomas) (Taken from the 1970 album Something)
3. "Yesterday I Heard The Rain" (Manzanero, Lees) (Taken from the 1970 album Something)
4. "Sea and Sand" (Harris, Colton, Smith) (Taken from the 1970 album Something)
5. "What About Today?" (David Shire, Richard Maltby Jr.) (Taken from the 1970 album Something)
6. "You And I" (Leslie Bricusse) (Taken from the 1970 album Something)
7. "Light My Fire" (The Doors) (Taken from the 1970 album Something)
8. "Yesterday When I Was Young" (Charles Aznavour, Kretzmer) (Taken from the 1970 album Something)
9. "Fool on the Hill" (John Lennon, Paul McCartney) (1971 single A-side)
10. "Where Do I Begin" (Francis Lai, Carl Sigman) (1971 single A-side)
11. "Till Love Touches Your Life" (Arthur Hamilton, Riz Ortolani) (Taken from the 1971 album Something Else)
12. "For the Love of Him" (Bobbi Martin, Al Mortimer) (1971 single B-side)
13. "Vehicle" (Johnny Harris) (Previously unreleased, recorded 15 February 1971)
14. "Diamonds Are Forever" (John Barry, Don Black) (1971 single A-side/soundtrack album track)
15. "The Way A Woman Loves" (Johnny Harris, John Bromley) (Taken from the 1972 album I Capricorn)
16. "For All We Know" (Fred Karlin, Robb Wilson, Arthur James) (Taken from the 1972 album I Capricorn)
17. "The Greatest Performance Of My Life" (Sandro, Anderle, R.I. Allen) (Taken from the 1972 album I Capricorn)
18. "Lost and Lonely" (Adriano Della Guistina, Vittorino Pecchia, Jon Hendricks) (Taken from the 1972 album I Capricorn)
19. "The Way of Love" (Al Stillman, Michel Rivgauche, Jack Dieval) (Taken from the 1972 album And I Love You So)
20. "Day By Day" (Stephen Schwartz, John-Michael Tebelak) (Taken from the 1972 album And I Love You So)
21. "Ballad of the Sad Young Man" (Landesman, Wolf) (Taken from the 1972 album And I Love You So)
22. "If I Should Love Again" (Guistina, Norman Newell) (1972 single B-side)
23. "Let Me Be the One" (Roger Nichols, Paul Williams) (Previously unreleased, recorded 28 August 1972)

=== CD Four. Bassey – The EMI/UA Years Vol.4 1973–1979 ===
1. "Never, Never, Never" (Tony Renis, Alberto Testa, Norman Newell) (Taken from the 1973 album Never Never Never)
2. "Somehow" (Larry Grossman, Hal Hackady) (Taken from the 1973 album Never Never Never)
3. "Going, Going, Gone" (John Barry, Alan Jay Lerner) (Taken from the 1973 album Never Never Never)
4. "Make The World a Little Younger" (T. Howell, Karen O'Hara, D. McReynolds) (Taken from the 1973 album Never Never Never)
5. "Everything I Own" (David Gates) (Previously unreleased, recorded February 1973)
6. "All That Love Went to Waste" (George Barrie, Sammy Cahn) (Taken from the 1974 album Nobody Does It Like Me)
7. "I'm Not Anyone" (Paul Anka, Johnny Harris) (Taken from the 1974 album Nobody Does It Like Me)
8. "Jesse" (Janis Ian) (Taken from the 1975 album Good, Bad but Beautiful)
9. "Living" (Gilbert Becaud, Pierre Delanoe, Marcel Stellman) (Taken from the 1975 album Good, Bad but Beautiful)
10. "Natali" (Balsamo, Norman Newell) (Taken from the 1976 album Love, Life and Feelings)
11. "If I Never Sing Another Song" (Don Black, Udo Jürgens) (Taken from the 1976 album Love, Life and Feelings)
12. "Can't Take My Eyes Off You" (Bob Crewe, Bob Gaudio (1976 single A-side)
13. "You Take My Heart Away" (Ben Raleigh, P. McClure) (Taken from the 1977 album You Take My Heart Away)
14. "Come in from the Rain" (Carole Bayer-Sager, Melissa Manchester) (Taken from the 1977 album You Take My Heart Away)
15. "Tomorrow Morning" (John Kander, Fred Ebb) (Previously unreleased, recorded 23 November 1976)
16. "Razzle Dazzle" (John Kander, Fred Ebb) (1977 single B-side)
17. "You Made Me Love You" (James V. Monaco, Joseph McCarthy) (Taken from the 1978 album Yesterdays)
18. "My Man" (Jacques Charles, Channing Pollack, Albert Willemetz, Maurice Yvain) (Previously unreleased, recorded in 1976)
19. "Nature Boy" (Eden Ahbez) (Previously unreleased, recorded in 1976)
20. "The Greatest Love of All" (Michael Masser, Linda Creed) (Taken from the 1979 album The Magic is You)
21. "Moonraker" (John Barry, Hal David) (1979 single A-side/soundtrack album track)

=== CD Five. Bassey – The EMI/UA Years Vol.5 Live 15th February, 1964, Carnegie Hall, New York ===
1. "Once in a Lifetime" (Anthony Newley, Leslie Bricusse)
2. "Just One of Those Things" (Cole Porter)
3. "As Long as He Needs Me" (Lionel Bart)
4. "Burn My Candle (at Both Ends)" (Ross Parker)
5. "All the Things You Are" (Oscar Hammerstein, Jerome Kern)
6. "If I Were a Bell" (Frank Loesser)
7. "What Now My Love" (Gilbert Bécaud, Pierre Leroyer, Carl Sigman)
8. "A Lot of Living To Do" (Charles Strouse, Lee Adams)
9. "No Regrets" (Charles Dumont, Hal David, Michael Vaucaire)
10. "Typically English" (Anthony Newley, Leslie Bricusse)
11. "In Other Words (Fly Me To Moon)" (Bart Howard)
12. "Please Mr. Brown" (Raye, Paul)
13. "I'm a Fool to Want You" (Joel Herron, Jack Wolf, Frank Sinatra)
14. "You" (Tony Osborne) (Incorrectly credited on CD cover)
15. "Johnny One Note" (Richard Rodgers, Lorenz Hart)
16. Medley: "I Could Have Danced All Night" (Lerner, Loewe) / "A Lovely Way To Spend an Evening" (McHugh, Adamson) (orchestra only)
