= 25th Anniversary Album =

Compilation album by Shirley Bassey
- Released: 13 October 1978
- Recorded: 1957–1976
- Genre: MOR
- Label: United Artists
- Producer: Various

Shirley Bassey chronology
Yesterdays (1978)	25th Anniversary Album (1978)	The Magic Is You (1979)

25th Anniversary Album is a compilation album by Shirley Bassey. Released in 1978 to mark her 25th year in show business, the album was a double set, comprising 40 tracks. The songs included span just 20 of the 25 years from 1957 to 1976, however, her first professional contract (which is reproduced within the album's inner sleeve) is dated 1953. Bassey had toured extensively throughout 1978 to mark her 25 years. This collection, including her biggest hits and some lesser-known recordings, became one of her biggest in the UK, where it reached No.3 and spent 12 weeks on the album chart.

== Overview ==
1978 marked the 25th anniversary of Shirley Bassey's professional singing career. Her first contract was signed on the 17 December 1953 for a fee of £10 for two shows on the 20 December. Her first recordings however, didn't come until 1956, with her first UK hit single arriving in 1957. For her 25th anniversary, Bassey embarked on an extensive tour throughout 1978. For 20 years, Bassey regularly hit the charts with the biggest of her hits being included on this, her first compilation to span her entire career. The most recent songs included were three tracks from her 1976 album Love, Life and Feelings. The double album was released in October 1978 on her regular United Artists Records label. The album entered the UK charts in early November and reached a peak of No.3, remaining on the chart for 12 weeks. The album was certified Platinum by the BPI at the end of the year, her only album to go higher than Gold certification. At the time of the album's release, Bassey hit the headlines when she was arrested after she was accused of being drunk and disorderly following a party for the album's launch in London. She performed a show the following month in the presence of Prince Charles while on bail and hit the headlines again.

The album was released in a lavish gatefold sleeve with a stapled four-page insert, showing photographs of Bassey's career as well as a photocopy of her very first contract. One contemporary review said it was one of the most important releases United Artists had ever undertaken.

== Track listing ==
Side One

1. "Fire Down Below" (Lester Lee / Ned Washington) – 2:46 (Originally released: non-album A-side, 1957)
2. "As I Love You" (Jay Livingston / Raymond Evans) – 2:53 (Non-album A-side, 1958)
3. "Banana Boat Song" (Alan Arkin / Bob Carey / Erik Darling) – 2:43 (Non-album A-side, 1957)
4. "You You Romeo" (Fred Elton) – 2:44 (Non-album A-side, 1957)
5. "Kiss Me Honey Honey Kiss Me" (Albon Timothy / Michael Julien) – 2:26 (from The Bewitching Miss Bassey, 1959)
6. "With These Hands" (Abner Silver / Benny Davis) – 3:19 (Non-album A-side, 1960)
7. "As Long As He Needs Me" (Lionel Bart) – 3:00 (Non-album A-side, 1960)
8. "Reach for the Stars" (Norman Newell / Udo Jurgens) – 2:58 (Non-album A-side, 1961)
9. "You'll Never Know (Just How Much I Love You)" (Harry Warren / Mack Gordon) – 3:07 (Non-album A-side, 1961)
10. "I'll Get By (As Long as I Have You)" (Fred E. Ahlert / Roy Turk) – 2:29 (Non-album A-side, 1961)
11. "Climb Ev'ry Mountain" (Rodgers and Hammerstein) – 3:12 (from Shirley Bassey, 1961)

Side Two

1. "Far Away" (Lionel Bart) – 3:12 (Non-album A-side, 1962)
2. "Ave Maria" (Charles Gounod) – 3:52 (Non-album A-side, 1962)
3. "What Now My Love" (Carl Sigman / Gilbert Bécaud) – 2:56 (from Let's Face the Music, 1962)
4. "Tonight" (Leonard Bernstein / Stephen Sondheim) – 2:34 (Non-album A-side, 1962)
5. "What Kind of Fool Am I" (Anthony Newley / Leslie Bricusse) – 3:18 (Non-album A-side, 1963)
6. "I (Who Have Nothing)" (Carlo Donida / Jerry Leiber and Mike Stoller) – 2:40 (Non-album A-side, 1963)
7. "My Special Dream" (Freddy Douglass / Howard Greenfield / Sol Kaplan) – 2:55 (Non-album A-side, 1964)
8. "Gone" (Tony Osborne) – 2:40 (Non-album A-side, 1964)
9. "Goldfinger" (John Barry / Anthony Newley / Leslie Bricusse) – 2:51 (from Goldfinger, 1964)
10. "No Regrets" (Tom Rush) – 4:25 (Should have been Non-album A-side from 1965 written by Charles Dumont but a track with the same name from the 1973 album Never Never Never, was used in error)

Side Three

1. "Big Spender" (Cy Coleman / Dorothy Fields) – 1:48 (from And We Were Lovers, 1967)
2. "Does Anybody Miss Me" (Johnny Worth / Les Reed) – 2:25 (from Does Anybody Miss Me, 1969)
3. "This Is My Life" (Bruno Canfora / Norman Newell) – 3:11 (from This Is My Life, 1968)
4. "Something" (George Harrison) – 3:32 (from Something, 1970)
5. "The Fool on the Hill" (John Lennon / Paul McCartney) – 3:19 (Non-album A-side, 1970)
6. "Diamonds Are Forever" (Don Black / John Barry) – 2:40 (from Diamonds Are Forever, 1971)
7. "Where Do I Begin (Love Story)" (Carl Sigman / Francis Lai) – 3:12 (from Something Else, 1971)
8. "For All We Know" (Arthur James / Fred Karlin / Robb Wilson) – 2:43 (from I Capricorn, 1971)
9. "And I Love You So" (Don McLean) – 4:27 (from And I Love You So, 1972)
10. "Make the World a Little Younger" (Denny McReynolds / Karen O'Hara / Terry Howell) – 3:34 (from Never Never Never, 1973)

Side Four

1. "Never, Never, Never (Grande, Grande, Grande)" (Alberto Testa / Norman Newell / Tony Renis) – 3:35 (from Never Never Never, 1973)
2. "Nobody Does It Like Me" (Cy Coleman / Dorothy Fields) – 2:14 (from Nobody Does It Like Me, 1974)
3. "Send In the Clowns" (Stephen Sondheim) – 3:18 (from Good, Bad but Beautiful, 1975)
4. "Emotion" (Patti Dahlstrom / Veronique Sanson) – 4:15 (from Good, Bad but Beautiful, 1975)
5. "Good, Bad but Beautiful" (Clive Westlake) – 3:24 (from Good, Bad but Beautiful, 1975)
6. "The Way We Were" (Alan and Marilyn Bergman / Marvin Hamlisch) – 2:45 (from Good, Bad but Beautiful, 1975)
7. "What I Did for Love" (Ed Kleban / Marvin Hamlisch) – 3:43 (from Love, Life and Feelings, 1976)
8. "Feelings" (Morris Albert) – 4:43 (from Love, Life and Feelings, 1976)
9. "If I Never Sing Another Song" (Don Black / Udo Jurgens) – 4:02 (from Love, Life and Feelings, 1976)

== Charts and certification ==
Chart (1978)	Peak position
UK Albums Chart	3

Region	Certification	Certified units/sales
United Kingdom (BPI)	Platinum	300,000^{^}
^{^} Shipments figures based on certification alone.
