= Four Decades of Song =

Shirley Bassey Four Decades Of Song

Compilation album by Shirley Bassey
- Released: 1996
- Genre: MOR
- Label: EMI
- Producer: Various

The Collection 2008

Four Decades of Song is a three-CD compilation from Shirley Bassey issued in 1996. This set features 54 songs recorded between 1959 and 1993. In 2008 EMI repackaged and retitled this boxset as Shirley Bassey The Collection; the new version had six extra tracks.

With the exception of "Secret Love" (track 13 on disc 3), all of these tracks were previously issued. This track was recorded in the mid-1960s but remained unreleased until 1996, and appears exclusively on this collection.

== Track listing ==
=== CD One ===
1. "Something" (George Harrison) (taken from the 1970 album Something)
2. "As Long as He Needs Me" (Lionel Bart) (1960 single A-side in stereo)
3. "Goldfinger" (Leslie Bricusse, Anthony Newley, John Barry) (1964 single A-side in stereo/soundtrack album track)
4. "With These Hands" (Abner Silver, Benny Davis) (1960 single A-side in stereo)
5. "Don't Rain on My Parade" (Bob Merrill, Jule Styne) (taken from the 1968 album 12 of Those Songs)
6. "In the Still of the Night" (Cole Porter) (taken from the 1961 album Shirley)
7. "Feelings" (Loulou Gaste, Morris Albert) (taken from the 1976 album Love, Life and Feelings)
8. "You Are the Sunshine of My Life" (Stevie Wonder) (taken from the 1974 album Nobody Does It Like Me)
9. "What Are You Doing the Rest of Your Life?" (Michel Legrand, Alan Bergman, Marilyn Bergman) (taken from the 1970 album Something)
10. "Cry Me a River" (Arthur Hamilton) (taken from the 1959 album The Fabulous Shirley Bassey)
11. "You'd Better Love Me" (Hugh Martin, Timothy Gray) (tive recording, taken from the 1965 album Shirley Bassey at the Pigalle)
12. "Imagination" (Johnny Burke, Van Heusen) (taken from the 1962 album Let's Face the Music)
13. "All of Me" (Gerald Marks, Seymour Simons) (taken from the 1962 album Let's Face the Music)
14. "Days of Wine and Roses" (Mancini, Johnny Mercer) (taken from the 1968 album 12 of Those Songs)
15. "If You Love Me (Hymne à l'amor)" (Edith Piaf, Marguerite Monnot, Geoffrey Claremont Parsons) (1959 single A-side in stereo)
16. "Love Is a Many-Splendored Thing" (Paul Francis Webster, Sammy Fain) (taken from the 1961 album Shirley Bassey)
17. "As If We Never Said Goodbye" (Andrew Lloyd Webber, Christopher Hampton, Don Black) (taken from the 1993 album Sings the Songs of Andrew Lloyd Webber)
18. "Don't Cry for Me Argentina" (Andrew Lloyd Webber, Tim Rice) (1993 re-recording) (taken from the 1993 album Sings the Songs of Andrew Lloyd Webber)

CD1 extra tracks for 2008 re-issue:

4. "Big Spender" (Cy Coleman, Dorothy Fields) (taken from the 1967 album And We Were Lovers)

5. "Diamonds Are Forever" (John Barry, Don Black) (1971 single A-side/soundtrack album track)

=== CD Two ===
1. "The Look of Love" (Burt Bacharach, Hal David) (taken from the 1972 album I Capricorn)
2. "Bridge Over Troubled Water" (Paul Simon) (taken from the 1971 album Something Else)
3. "My Way" (Jacques Revaux, Claude Francois, Gilles Thibaut, Paul Anka) (taken from the 1970 album Something)
4. "Funny Girl" (taken from the 1968 album This Is My Life)
5. "It's Impossible" (Armando Manzanero) (taken from the 1971 album Something Else)
6. "Breakfast in Bed" (Eddie Hinton, Donnie Fritts) (taken from the 1971 album Something Else)
7. "One Less Bell to Answer" (Burt Bacharach, Hal David) (taken from the 1972 album I Capricorn)
8. "Greatest Love of All" (Michael Masser, Linda Creed) (taken from the 1978 album The Magic Is You)
9. "You Never Done It Like That" (Neil Sedaka, Howard Greenfield) (taken from the 1978 album The Magic Is You)
10. "Better Off Alone" (Bruce Roberts, Carole Bayer Sager) (taken from the 1978 album The Magic Is You)
11. "As We Fall in Love Once More" (Richard Germinaro, Evie Sands, Ben Weisman) (taken from the 1978 album The Magic Is You)
12. "Night Moves" (Michael Franks, Michael Small) (taken from the 1978 album The Magic Is You)
13. "Anyone Who Had a Heart" (Burt Bacharach, Hal David) (taken from the 1978 album The Magic Is You)
14. "The Magic Is You" (S. Vlanianos, R. Rupen) (taken from the 1978 album The Magic Is You)
15. "How Insensitive" (Antônio Carlos Jobim, Vinícius de Moraes, Norman Gimbel (taken from the 1978 album The Magic Is You)
16. "Run On and On and On" (Love) (taken from the 1975 album Good, Bad but Beautiful)
17. "I'll Be Your Audience" (Becky Hobbs, Lewis Anderson) (taken from the 1975 album Good, Bad but Beautiful)
18. "All in Love Is Fair" (Stevie Wonder) (taken from the 1975 album Good, Bad but Beautiful)

CD2 extra tracks for 2008 re-issue:

4. "You'll Never Know" (Harry Warren, Mack Gordon) (1961 single A-side in stereo)

20. "What Kind of Fool Am I?" (Leslie Bricusse, Anthony Newley) (1963 single A-side in stereo)

=== CD Three ===
1. "The Way We Were" (Alan Bergman, Marilyn Bergman, Marvin Hamlisch) (taken from the 1975 album Good, Bad but Beautiful)
2. "What I Did for Love" (taken from the 1976 album Love, Life and Feelings)
3. "Emotion" (Dahlstrom, Sanson) (taken from the 1975 album Good, Bad but Beautiful)
4. "Good, Bad but Beautiful" (Lake) (taken from the 1975 album Good, Bad but Beautiful)
5. "Where or When" (Richard Rodgers, Lorenz Hart) (taken from the 1961 album Shirley Bassey)
6. "Kiss Me Honey, Honey Kiss Me" (Al Timothy, Michael Julien) (1966 re-recording, taken from the 1966 album I've Got a Song for You)
7. "Ave Maria" (1962 single A-side in stereo)
8. "My Special Dream" (1964 single A-side in stereo)
9. "Let There Be Love" (Lionel Grant, Ian Rand) (taken from the 1961 album Shirley)
10. "I've Got You Under My Skin" (Cole Porter) (taken from the 1959 album The Fabulous Shirley Bassey)
11. "In Other Words (Fly Me to the Moon)" (Bart Howard) (1963 EP A-side in stereo)
12. "Just One of Those Things" (Cole Porter) (1963 EP A-side in stereo)
13. "Secret Love" (Sammy Fain, Paul Francis Webster) (previously unreleased)
14. "Born to Lose"" (Sergio Bardotti, Dario Baldan Bembo, Norman Newell) (taken from the 1976 album Love, Life and Feelings)
15. "Come Back to Me" (Alan Jay Lerner, Burton Lane) (taken from the 1968 album 12 of Those Songs)
16. "If I Were a Bell" (Frank Loesser) (taken from the 1961 album Shirley)
17. "Something Wonderful" (Richard Rodgers, Oscar Hammerstein II) (taken from the 1965 album Shirley Stops the Shows)
18. "He Loves Me" (Jerry Bock, Sheldon Harnick) (taken from the 1965 album Shirley Stops the Shows)

CD3 extra tracks for 2008 re-issue:

19. "I (Who Have Nothing)" (Mogol, Donida, Jerry Leiber, Mike Stoller) (1963 single A-side in stereo)

20. "I'll Get By (As Long as I Have You)" (Fred E. Ahlert, Roy Turk) (1961 single A-side in stereo)
