= The Best of Bond... James Bond =

- Original 1992 release cover (30th anniversary)

Soundtrack album from the James Bond films by various artists
- Released: 1992
- Recorded: 1962–1989
- Genre: Soundtrack
- Length: 58:17
- Label: Capitol, MGM Music

Professional ratings
Review scores
Source	Rating
AllMusic	1992
AllMusic	2002
AllMusic	2008

The Best of Bond... James Bond is the title of various compilation albums of music used in the James Bond films made by Eon Productions up to that time. The album was originally released in 1992 as The Best of James Bond, as a one-disc compilation and a two-disc 30th Anniversary Limited Edition compilation with songs that had, at that point, never been released to the public. The single disc compilation was later updated five times in 1999, 2002, 2008, 2012, and 2021. The 2008 version was augmented with the addition of a DVD featuring music videos and a documentary. Another two-disc edition, this time containing 50 tracks for the 50th anniversary of the franchise, was released in 2012.

== 30th Anniversary Collection ==
The 30th Anniversary Collection of The Best of James Bond was released in 1992. It featured 19 tracks including 16 title songs for the 16 films that had thus far been released.

=== Track listing ===
1. "James Bond Theme" – Monty Norman Orchestra
2. "Goldfinger" – Shirley Bassey
3. "Nobody Does It Better" – Carly Simon
4. "A View to a Kill" – Duran Duran
5. "Mr. Kiss Kiss Bang Bang" – Dionne Warwick
6. "For Your Eyes Only" – Sheena Easton
7. "We Have All the Time in the World" – Louis Armstrong
8. "Live and Let Die" – Paul McCartney & Wings
9. "All Time High" – Rita Coolidge
10. "The Living Daylights" – a-ha
11. "Licence to Kill" – Gladys Knight
12. "From Russia with Love" – Matt Monro
13. "Thunderball" – Tom Jones
14. "You Only Live Twice" – Nancy Sinatra
15. "Moonraker" – Shirley Bassey
16. "On Her Majesty's Secret Service" – John Barry Orchestra
17. "The Man with the Golden Gun" – Lulu
18. "Diamonds Are Forever" – Shirley Bassey
19. "007" – John Barry Orchestra

A limited 2-disc edition, released in the US only, reshuffles the tracks, sorting chronologically the 16 title songs on disc 1, the three remaining tracks appearing on disc 2. It also includes four tracks that were originally missing from Goldfinger's soundtrack (US release), although these four were included in the remastered soundtrack for Goldfinger in 2003 and appeared on the British LP in the 1960s. The "Thunderball Suite", was likewise not released on the Thunderball soundtrack until it was split up and used on the remastered release in 2003, along with extra unreleased music.

Two rare additions were also made to the second disc. The first is the original version of "Goldfinger" sung by Anthony Newley who also wrote the song in collaboration with the film's composer, John Barry. Newley's jazz version was, however, replaced by Shirley Bassey's version in 1964 for the film and for release on the album. Newley's version was first released with the 30th Anniversary Collection. The second rare addition is Shirley Bassey's version of "Mr. Kiss Kiss Bang Bang" for Thunderball. Bassey had originally recorded the vocals for the track which initially was to be used as the main title theme; however, the song was replaced by Tom Jones' "Thunderball" after a decision by the producers that the title theme should feature the name of the film. Dionne Warwick was subsequently chosen to rerecord "Mr. Kiss Kiss Bang Bang", but even her version was not released on the Thunderball soundtrack till the 1990s.

=== Track listing (limited edition) ===
==== Disc one ====
1. "James Bond Theme" – Monty Norman Orchestra
2. "From Russia with Love" – Matt Monro
3. "Goldfinger" – Shirley Bassey
4. "Thunderball" – Tom Jones
5. "You Only Live Twice" – Nancy Sinatra
6. "On Her Majesty's Secret Service" – John Barry Orchestra
7. "Diamonds Are Forever" – Shirley Bassey
8. "Live and Let Die" – Paul McCartney & Wings
9. "The Man with the Golden Gun" – Lulu
10. "Nobody Does It Better" – Carly Simon
11. "Moonraker" – Shirley Bassey
12. "For Your Eyes Only" – Sheena Easton
13. "All Time High" – Rita Coolidge
14. "A View to a Kill" – Duran Duran
15. "The Living Daylights" – a-ha
16. "Licence to Kill" – Gladys Knight

==== Disc two ====
1. "James Bond Theme" – John Barry Orchestra
2. "007" – John Barry Orchestra
3. "Goldfinger" – Anthony Newley (demo)
4. "Pussy Galore's Flying Circus" – John Barry (Goldfinger)
5. "Golden Girl" – John Barry (Goldfinger)
6. "Death of Tilly" – John Barry (Goldfinger)
7. "The Laser Beam" – John Barry (Goldfinger)
8. "Mr. Kiss Kiss Bang Bang" – Dionne Warwick
9. "Thunderball Suite" – John Barry (Thunderball)
10. "Mr. Kiss Kiss Bang Bang" – Shirley Bassey (original recording)
11. "You Only Live Twice" – Julie Rogers (demo version)
12. You Only Live Twice (radio spot)
13. "We Have All the Time in the World" – Louis Armstrong
14. Thunderball (radio spot)
15. Live and Let Die (radio spot)

== 1999 release ==
=== Track listing ===
1. "James Bond Theme" – John Barry & Orchestra
2. "Goldfinger" – Shirley Bassey
3. "Nobody Does It Better" – Carly Simon
4. "A View to a Kill" – Duran Duran
5. "For Your Eyes Only" – Sheena Easton
6. "We Have All the Time in the World" – Louis Armstrong
7. "Live and Let Die" – Paul McCartney & Wings
8. "All Time High" – Rita Coolidge
9. "The Living Daylights" – a-ha
10. "Licence to Kill" – Gladys Knight
11. "From Russia with Love" – Matt Monro
12. "Thunderball" – Tom Jones
13. "You Only Live Twice" – Nancy Sinatra
14. "Moonraker" – Shirley Bassey
15. "On Her Majesty's Secret Service" – John Barry & Orchestra
16. "The Man with the Golden Gun" – Lulu
17. "Diamonds Are Forever" – Shirley Bassey
18. "GoldenEye" – Tina Turner
19. "Tomorrow Never Dies" – Sheryl Crow

== 2002 release ==
=== Track listing ===
1. "James Bond Theme" – John Barry & Orchestra
2. "Goldfinger" – Shirley Bassey
3. "Nobody Does It Better" – Carly Simon
4. "A View to a Kill" – Duran Duran
5. "For Your Eyes Only" – Sheena Easton
6. "We Have All the Time in the World" – Louis Armstrong
7. "Live and Let Die" – Paul McCartney & Wings
8. "All Time High" – Rita Coolidge
9. "The Living Daylights" – a-ha
10. "Licence to Kill" – Gladys Knight
11. "From Russia with Love" – Matt Monro
12. "Thunderball" – Tom Jones
13. "You Only Live Twice" – Nancy Sinatra
14. "Moonraker" – Shirley Bassey
15. "On Her Majesty's Secret Service" – The John Barry Orchestra
16. "The Man with the Golden Gun" – Lulu
17. "Diamonds Are Forever" – Shirley Bassey
18. "GoldenEye" – Tina Turner
19. "Tomorrow Never Dies" – Sheryl Crow
20. "The World Is Not Enough" – Garbage
21. "James Bond Theme (Moby's Re-Version)" – Moby
22. "James Bond Theme (GoldenEye Trailer Version) – Starr Parodi & Jeff Eden Fair (previously unreleased)

== 2008 release ==
=== Track listing ===
==== Disc one (CD) ====
1. "James Bond Theme" – John Barry & Orchestra
2. "From Russia with Love" – Matt Monro
3. "Goldfinger" – Shirley Bassey
4. "Thunderball" – Tom Jones
5. "You Only Live Twice" – Nancy Sinatra
6. "On Her Majesty's Secret Service" – The John Barry Orchestra
7. "We Have All the Time in the World" – Louis Armstrong
8. "Diamonds Are Forever" – Shirley Bassey
9. "Live and Let Die" – Paul McCartney & Wings
10. "The Man with the Golden Gun" – Lulu
11. "Nobody Does It Better" – Carly Simon
12. "Moonraker" – Shirley Bassey
13. "For Your Eyes Only" – Sheena Easton
14. "All Time High" – Rita Coolidge
15. "A View to a Kill" – Duran Duran
16. "The Living Daylights" – a-ha
17. "Licence to Kill" – Gladys Knight
18. "GoldenEye" – Tina Turner
19. "Tomorrow Never Dies" – Sheryl Crow
20. "Surrender" – k.d. lang
21. "The World Is Not Enough" – Garbage
22. "Die Another Day" – Madonna
23. "You Know My Name" – Chris Cornell
24. "James Bond Theme" – John Arnold (Bonus Track, Previously Unreleased)

==== Disc two (DVD) ====
1. "A View to A Kill" – Duran Duran
2. "For Your Eyes Only" – Sheena Easton
3. "GoldenEye" – Tina Turner
4. "The Living Daylights" – A-Ha
5. "All Time High" – Rita Coolidge
6. "Goldfinger" – Shirley Bassey (Live at Royal Albert Hall, 1974)
7. Documentary: The Music of James Bond

== 2012 release ==
Released to celebrate the 50th anniversary of the series, the 2012 release eschews the gun barrel sequence that served as the cover motif so far to instead feature the "Golden Girl" from Goldfinger. It was released in two versions, a two-disc edition with 50 tracks, and a single-disc edition with only the first CD, comprising 23 tracks.

=== Track listing ===
==== Disc one ====
1. "James Bond Theme" – John Barry Orchestra
2. "From Russia with Love" – Matt Monro
3. "Goldfinger" – Shirley Bassey
4. "Thunderball" – Tom Jones
5. "You Only Live Twice" – Nancy Sinatra
6. "On Her Majesty's Secret Service" – John Barry Orchestra
7. "We Have All the Time in the World" – Louis Armstrong
8. "Diamonds Are Forever" – Shirley Bassey
9. "Live and Let Die" – Paul McCartney & Wings
10. "The Man with the Golden Gun" – Lulu
11. "Nobody Does It Better" – Carly Simon
12. "Moonraker" – Shirley Bassey
13. "For Your Eyes Only" – Sheena Easton
14. "All Time High" – Rita Coolidge
15. "A View to a Kill" – Duran Duran
16. "The Living Daylights" – a-ha
17. "Licence to Kill" – Gladys Knight (film edit)
18. "GoldenEye" – Tina Turner (film edit)
19. "Tomorrow Never Dies" – Sheryl Crow
20. "The World Is Not Enough" – Garbage
21. "Die Another Day" – Madonna
22. "You Know My Name" – Chris Cornell
23. "Another Way to Die" – Jack White & Alicia Keys

==== Disc two ====
1. "Dr. No's Fantasy" – Monty Norman Orchestra (Dr. No)
2. "Under the Mango Tree" – Diana Coupland (Dr. No)
3. "007" – John Barry Orchestra
4. "Opening Titles: James Bond Is Back/From Russia with Love/James Bond Theme" – John Barry Orchestra (From Russia with Love)
5. "Into Miami" – John Barry Orchestra (Goldfinger)
6. "The Laser Beam" – John Barry Orchestra
7. "Mr. Kiss Kiss Bang Bang" – Shirley Bassey
8. "Switching the Body" – John Barry Orchestra (Thunderball)
9. "Capsule in Space" – John Barry Orchestra (You Only Live Twice)
10. "Do You Know How Christmas Trees Are Grown?" – Nina
11. "Bond Smells a Rat" – John Barry Orchestra (Diamonds Are Forever)
12. "Fillet of Soul – New Orleans/Live and Let Die/Fillet of Soul – Harlem" – George Martin Orchestra featuring B. J. Arnau
13. "Underground Lair" – George Martin Orchestra (Live and Let Die)
14. "Hip's Trip" – John Barry Orchestra (The Man with the Golden Gun)
15. "The Pyramids" – Marvin Hamlisch (The Spy Who Loved Me)
16. "Cable Car and Snake Fight" – John Barry Orchestra (Moonraker)
17. "Make It Last All Night" – Bill Conti featuring Rage
18. "The Chase Bomb Theme" – John Barry Orchestra (Octopussy)
19. "Snow Job" – John Barry Orchestra (A View to a Kill)
20. "Where Has Everybody Gone?" – The Pretenders
21. "If There Was a Man" – The Pretenders
22. "The Experience of Love" – Éric Serra
23. "James Bond Theme (Moby's Re-Version)" – Moby
24. "Surrender" – k.d. lang
25. "Only Myself to Blame" – Scott Walker
26. "Vesper" – David Arnold (Casino Royale)
27. "Time to Get Out" – David Arnold (Quantum of Solace)

== 2021 release ==
Released to coincide with the release of No Time to Die, the packaging reverts back to the gun barrel design and it was released on 2-disc CD and 3-disc vinyl.

=== Track listing (CD) ===
==== Disc 1 ====
1. "James Bond Theme" – John Barry Orchestra
2. "From Russia with Love" – Matt Monro
3. "Goldfinger" – Shirley Bassey
4. "Thunderball" – Tom Jones
5. "You Only Live Twice" – Nancy Sinatra
6. "On Her Majesty's Secret Service" – John Barry Orchestra
7. "We Have All the Time in the World" – Louis Armstrong
8. "Diamonds Are Forever" – Shirley Bassey
9. "Live and Let Die" – Paul McCartney & Wings
10. "The Man with the Golden Gun" – Lulu
11. "Nobody Does It Better" – Carly Simon
12. "Moonraker" – Shirley Bassey
13. "For Your Eyes Only" – Sheena Easton
14. "All Time High" – Rita Coolidge

==== Disc 2 ====
1. "A View to a Kill" – Duran Duran
2. "The Living Daylights" – a-ha
3. "Licence to Kill" – Gladys Knight (film edit)
4. "GoldenEye" – Tina Turner (film edit)
5. "Tomorrow Never Dies" – Sheryl Crow
6. "The World Is Not Enough" – Garbage
7. "Die Another Day" – Madonna
8. "You Know My Name" – Chris Cornell
9. "Another Way to Die" – Jack White & Alicia Keys
10. "Skyfall" – Adele
11. "Writing's on the Wall" – Sam Smith
12. "No Time to Die" – Billie Eilish

== Compilation catalog numbers ==
1. 1992 cassette tape: EMI Records USA 0777 7 98413 4 9
2. 1992 single CD: EMI Records USA 0777 7 98413 2 5
3. 1992 double CD: EMI Records USA 07777 98560 2 2
4. 2002 CD: Capitol Records/MGM Music 72435-40554-2-3
5. 2008 CD: Capitol Records/MGM Music 50999 243352 25
6. 2012 single CD: Capitol Records/MGM Music 50999 232817 21
7. 2012 double CD: Capitol Records/MGM Music 50999 232818 20

== See also ==
- Outline of James Bond
