= Born to Lose =

Born to Lose may refer to:

- "Born to Lose" (Ted Daffan song), associated with Ray Charles since 1962 and composed 1943 by Ted Daffan
- "Born to Lose", a single by Jackie Lee (Irish singer), 1967
- "Born to Lose", on LaVern Baker album Let Me Belong to You, 1970
- "Born to Lose", on the Black Sabbath album The Eternal Idol, 1987
- "Born to Lose", on the Shirley Bassey album Four Decades of Song (recorded 1976)
- "Born to Lose", on the Johnny Thunders and the Heartbreakers album L.A.M.F., 1977
- "Born to Lose", on the UFO album Obsession, 1978
- "Born to Lose", on the Social Distortion album Somewhere Between Heaven and Hell, 1992
- "Born to Lose", on the Black Label Society album Sonic Brew, 1998
- "Born to Lose", on the King Adora single "Born to Lose/Kamikaze", 2003
- "Born to Lose", on the Motörhead album The Wörld Is Yours, 2010
- "Born to Lose", on The Devil Wears Prada album Dead Throne, 2011
- "Born to Lose", on the Sleigh Bells album Reign of Terror, 2012
- "Born to Lose", on the Zebrahead album Call Your Friends, 2013
- "Born to Lose", on the American Football self-titled album, 2016
- "Born to Lose", on The Amity Affliction album Everyone Loves You... Once You Leave Them, 2020
- “Born to Lose”, on The Avalanches album We Will Always Love You, 2020

== See also ==
- Born to Lose, Built to Win, an album by Juelz Santana
- "Iron Horse/Born to Lose", a song by Motörhead first released on their 1977 debut album Motörhead
