= Thoughts of Love =

Compilation album by Shirley Bassey
- Released: 1976
- Genre: MOR
- Label: United Artists
- Producer: Various

Thoughts of Love is a compilation album released in 1976 by singer Shirley Bassey. A themed compilation of love songs, selected from material recorded in the late 1960s and early 1970s, the album sold well in the UK and Germany, reaching the Top 20 in the UK Albums Chart and achieved Gold status. Thoughts of Love was re-issued on CD in 2011 by BGO Records, together with the 1979 album The Magic Is You.

== Track listing ==
Side one

1. "Send in the Clowns" (Stephen Sondheim) Previously released on the 1975 album Good, Bad but Beautiful
2. "Killing Me Softly with His Song" (Charles Fox, Norman Gimbel) Previously released on the 1973 album Never Never Never
3. "Feelings" (Loulou Gasté) Previously released on the 1976 album Love, Life and Feelings
4. "What Are You Doing the Rest of Your Life?" (Alan Bergman, Michel Legrand) Previously released on the 1970 album Something
5. "What I Did for Love" (Edward Kleban, Marvin Hamlisch) Previously released on the 1976 album Love, Life and Feelings
6. "All That Love Went to Waste" (Sammy Cahn, George Barrie) Previously released on the 1974 album Nobody Does It Like Me

Side two

1. "The Way We Were" (Alan Bergman, Marilyn Bergman, Marvin Hamlisch) Previously released on the 1975 album Good, Bad but Beautiful
2. "If You Go Away" (Jacques Brel, Rod McKuen) Previously released on the 1967 album And We Were Lovers
3. "Alone Again (Naturally)" (Gilbert O'Sullivan) Previously released on the 1976 album Love, Life and Feelings
4. "Jesse" (Janis Ian) Previously released on the 1975 album Good, Bad but Beautiful
5. "I Won't Last a Day Without You" (Paul Williams, Roger Nichols) Previously released on the 1973 album Never Never Never
6. "You Are the Sunshine of My Life" (Stevie Wonder) Previously released on the 1974 album Nobody Does It Like Me
