= Goldfinger (soundtrack) =

- Album cover by Robert Brownjohn

Soundtrack album by John Barry
- Released: 1964
- Recorded: 1964
- Studios: CTS Studios, Bayswater, London
- Genre: Soundtrack
- Length: 29:35 (1964 release); 41:09 (2003 re-release)
- Label: EMI
- Producer: Frank Collura (Reissue)

John Barry chronology
Zulu (1963)	Goldfinger (1964)	Four in the Morning (1965)

Singles from Goldfinger
- 1. "Goldfinger" Released: 18 September 1964 (UK); 2 November 1964 (US)

Goldfinger is the soundtrack of the 1964 film of the same name. The album was composed by John Barry and distributed by EMI. Two versions were released initially, one in the United States and the United Kingdom, which varied in terms of length and which tracks were within the soundtrack. In 2003, Capitol-EMI records released a remastered version that contained all the tracks from both releases.

== Background ==
John Barry had composed the previous James Bond soundtrack for From Russia with Love. Due to Barry's increased "compositional depth" as seen through the soundtracks he produced since From Russia with Love, movie producers Albert Broccoli and Harry Saltzman allowed him to write the theme song for Goldfinger in addition to the soundtrack. Barry created the melody of the song before drafting the lyrics with the help of Anthony Newley and Leslie Bricusse. The theme was first sung by Newley at a demo session on 14 May 1964. At the behest of Barry, Shirley Bassey was chosen to sing the track. On Bassey, Barry was quoted saying "Nobody could have sung it like her; she had that great dramatic sense." The theme was recorded on 20 August 1964 after an all-night session in the recording studio. The session was produced by EMI in-house producer George Martin, who also was the Beatles' producer at the time. Guitarist Vic Flick, who played on the track, recalled at a 2012 Academy of Motion Pictures Arts and Sciences salute to the music of James Bond that Bassey was having difficulty getting a proper take. Martin spoke to her and then over the recording baffle her brassiere came flying. She nailed it on the next take.

Session musicians on the Bond films were separately relegated to the instrumental score versions of songs, while the main musicians (on Goldfinger: Vic Flick) were given the main film theme song to solely record, to be featured at the beginning of the film. Notably, two of the session musicians were John Paul Jones and Jimmy Page, who together would be the founding members of Led Zeppelin.

Co-producer Harry Saltzman is said to have hated the song as too old fashioned for 1960s youth culture and only agreed to use it when persuaded by Albert Broccoli.

Originally, Newley recorded a version of the theme song, but it was later re-recorded with Bassey's voice for the film and soundtrack album. In 1992, Newley's version was released for the 30th anniversary of James Bond on film in the compilation collectors edition The Best of Bond... James Bond.

The score was composed by Barry, making this his second, credited Bond score. The score makes regular use of instrumental arrangements of the title theme, as well as the "James Bond Theme" from Dr. No used in the gun barrel sequence. The score makes heavy use of brass. The distinctive music for Auric Goldfinger (Gert Fröbe)'s henchman, Oddjob (Harold Sakata), makes use of repeated strokes on a metallic anvil. Metallic chimes are also heard in many scenes associated with Oddjob or gold, notably that in which the dead golden girl Jill Masterson (Shirley Eaton) is discovered. The very effective use of music and various sound effects in the film won it an Academy Award for Best Sound Effects at the 37th Academy Awards. The album reached No. 1 on the Billboard 200 – the first James Bond soundtrack to do so, and spent 70 total weeks on the chart, but for reasons that remain unclear, received no RIAA certification.

== Versions ==
Two versions of the soundtrack were released. The American version lasted close to 30 minutes and contained 11 tracks. It lacked four tracks ("Golden Girl", "Death of Tilley", "The Laser Beam", "Pussy Galore's Flying Circus") but contained the instrumental rock guitar version of the title theme song not found on the British LP. The instrumental was in the style of the John Barry Seven's instrumental hits in Britain. The British record contained 14 tracks and lasted around 38 minutes. In 2003, the soundtrack was remastered and all the tracks originally released were compiled onto one album that contained fifteen tracks and over 41 minutes of music. The remastered version was released through Capitol-EMI records.

== Reception ==
Professional ratings
Review scores
Source	Rating
AllMusic	4.5/5 stars

Gillian Garr, a writer for Goldmine reflecting on the album in 2013, found the album to be "less satisfying today", but stated the theme song was one of the "best-ever Bond theme songs." Film Score Monthly writer Darren MacDonald found the remastered edition to be the best score of the James Bond series, giving it five out of five stars. MacDonald wrote that the score was "big and ballsy, mainly jazz and orchestral fusion, with Shirley Bassey belting out the fantastic title song." He added that the remastered edition's sound quality was "impeccable".

== Chart positions ==
Year	Chart	Position
1965	Billboard Pop Albums (Billboard 200)	1

== Track listing ==
Side one
No.	Title	Length
1.	"Main Title – Into Miami – Goldfinger, 1964" (John Barry)	3:31
2.	"Alpine Drive – Auric's Factory"	4:22
3.	"Oddjob's Pressing Engagement (Note: This composition contains the James Bond Theme, originally composed for the Dr. No soundtrack)"	3:06
4.	"Bond Back in Action Again"	2:31
5.	"Teasing the Korean"	2:11
6.	"Gassing the Gangsters"	1:04
Total length:		16:45

Side two
No.	Title	Length
1.	"Goldfinger (Instrumental Version)"	2:59
2.	"Dawn Raid on Fort Knox"	4:57
3.	"The Arrival of the Bomb and Count Down"	2:23
4.	"The Death of Goldfinger – End Titles"	2:31
Total length:		12:50

2003 Remastered edition
No.	Title	Length
1.	"Main Title"	2:48
2.	"Into Miami"	0:57
3.	"Alpine Drive – Auric's Factory"	4:22
4.	"Oddjob's Pressing Engagement"	3:06
5.	"Bond Back in Action Again"	2:31
6.	"Teasing the Korean"	2:11
7.	"Gassing the Gangsters"	1:04
8.	"Goldfinger (Instrumental Version)"	2:10
9.	"Dawn Raid on Fort Knox"	5:48
10.	"The Arrival of the Bomb and Count Down"	3:29
11.	"The Death of Goldfinger – End Titles"	2:34
12.	"Golden Girl"	2:10
13.	"Death of Tilly"	2:04
14.	"The Laser Beam"	2:54
15.	"Pussy Galore's Flying Circus"	2:48
Total length:		41:09

== 2025 La La Land Expanded Track Listing ==
SCORE PRESENTATION 39:17

1. Bond Back In Action Again 2:31 (Contains The James Bond Theme)
2. Main Title – Goldfinger 2:51 Performed by Shirley Bassey
3. Into Miami 0:58
4. Golden Girl 2:10
5. Alpine Drive – Auric's Factory 4:28
6. Death Of Tilly 2:05
7. The Laser Beam 2:53
8. Pussy Galore's Flying Circus 2:48
9. Teasing The Korean 2:15
10. Gassing The Gangsters 1:04
11. Oddjob's Pressing Engagement 3:07 (Contains The James Bond Theme)
12. Dawn Raid On Fort Knox 5:48
13. The Arrival Of The Bomb And Countdown 3:29
14. The Death Of Goldfinger – End Titles 2:34

ADDITIONAL MUSIC 7:53

1. Goldfinger (Instrumental Version) 2:09
2. Goldfinger 2:50 Performed by Anthony Newley
3. Goldfinger (Mono Version) 2:50 Performed by Shirley Bassey

TOTAL ALBUM TIME: 47:17

This is a CD format release

== Credits ==
From the record page at AllMusic:

- Project manager: Herb Agner
- Creative director: Michelle Azzopardi
- Composer, conductor, primary artist: John Barry
- Primary artist, vocals: Shirley Bassey
- Liner notes: Jeff Bond
- Composer, lyricist: Leslie Bricusse
- Project manager: Wendy Brueder
- Producer, reissue producer: Frank Collura
- Remastering: Bob Fisher
- Guitar, soloist: Vic Flick
- Art direction, design: Peter Grant
- Orchestra contractor: Sid Margo
- Lyricist: Anthony Newley
- A&R: Gregg Ogorzelec
- Engineer: John Richards
- Saxophone, soloist: John Scott

== Aftermath ==
Following the success of her performance on the title track, Shirley Bassey sang the title songs for two later Bond films, Diamonds Are Forever (1971) and Moonraker (1979). John Barry used the Goldfinger theme on his 1965 John Barry Plays Goldfinger album that featured Robert Brownjohn artwork.
