= Climb Ev'ry Mountain =

Show tune from the 1959 musical The Sound of Music

Song
- Released: 1959
- Genre: Show tune
- Composer: Richard Rodgers
- Lyricist: Oscar Hammerstein II

"Climb Ev'ry Mountain" is a show tune from the 1959 Rodgers and Hammerstein musical The Sound of Music. It is sung at the close of the first act and is sung again in the epilogue of the second act by the Mother Abbess. It is themed as an inspirational piece, to encourage people to take every step toward attaining their dreams.

== Background ==
This song shares inspirational overtones with the song "You'll Never Walk Alone" from Carousel. They are both sung by the female mentor characters in the shows, and are used to give strength to the protagonists in the story, and both are given powerful reprises at the end of their respective shows. As Oscar Hammerstein II was writing the lyrics, it developed its own inspirational overtones along the lines of an earlier Hammerstein song, "There's a Hill Beyond a Hill". He felt that the metaphors of climbing mountains and fording streams better fitted Maria's quest for her spiritual compass. The muse behind the song was Sister Gregory, the head of Drama at Rosary College in Illinois. The letters that she sent to Hammerstein and to Mary Martin, the first Maria von Trapp on Broadway, described the parallels between a nun's choice for a religious life and the choices that humans must make to find their purpose and direction in life. When she read the manuscript of the lyrics, she confessed that it "drove [her] to the Chapel" because the lyrics conveyed "what we ordinary souls feel but cannot communicate."

The song has often been sung by operatically trained voices in professional stage productions. In the original Broadway production it was sung by Patricia Neway, in the original London production it was sung by Constance Shacklock, and in the original Australian production it was sung by Rosina Raisbeck.

In the original stage play, the Mother Abbess sings the song at the end of the first act. When Ernest Lehman wrote the screenplay for the film adaptation, he shifted the scene so that this song would be the first major song of the second act. When Robert Wise and his film crew were filming this scene, Peggy Wood had some reservations about the words, which she felt were too "pretentious." In addition to that, while Peggy herself was an accomplished singer earlier in her career, the song was simply too difficult for her to perform at that age. As a result, her singing voice was dubbed by Margery MacKay, the wife of composer, music director and pianist Harper MacKay, as Wood was not able to sing the high notes of the song. Rodgers wrote the piece in the key of C, with a modulation towards the end of the piece into the key of D flat, making the last note that the Mother Abbess sings an A flat (Ab5), though in the film it was sung a tone lower.

With the popularity of the stage play it would seem Peggy Wood was not alone. Given the range of the piece and the average age of the actor playing Mother Abbess, the oldest character in the story, the song has proven daunting for many actresses over the years.

In addition, due to the long instrumental introduction of the song, Wood was repeatedly unable to catch the first word lip synching to McKay's playback. So they filmed the beginning part of her performance in silhouette against the wall of the set for the Mother Abbess' office with her back to camera. As director Robert Wise reports, once the vocal had begun, she had no problem matching the performance. Reviewing the dailies later, everybody thought it looked as if the Mother Abbess was receiving divine guidance and so the performance was kept as it was.

== Other versions ==
"Climb Ev'ry Mountain"

Single by Shirley Bassey

from the album Shirley Bassey
- B-side: "Reach for the Stars"
- Released: July 1961
- Recorded: 1959
- Length: 3:10
- Label: Columbia
- Songwriter: Rodgers and Hammerstein

Shirley Bassey singles chronology
"You'll Never Know" (1961)	"Climb Ev'ry Mountain" (1961)	"I'll Get By" (1961)

- 1959: Tony Bennett had a minor hit single (No. 74) of the song
- 1960: Andy Williams on his album The Village of St. Bernadette
- 1960: The Fleetwoods on their album, The Best of The Fleetwoods
- 1961: Welsh singer Shirley Bassey, as part of a double A-sided single with "Reach for the Stars", which reached #1 in the UK and remained on the charts for 18 weeks
- 1971: Judith Durham recorded and released a version as the first single from her album, Climb Ev'ry Mountain
- 1984: Tammy Wynette performed the song at the Summer Olympics.
- 1989: Sissel Kyrkjebø sang a Norwegian version, "Se Over Fjellet" on the album Soria Moria
- 1992: Alex Burrall's version in the movie The Jacksons: An American Dream, portraying Michael Jackson (6–8 years of age) at a school pageant show
- 1997: A choir of the song is performed by SMUN 2 Soposurung for the opening ceremony of the 1997 SEA Games
- 2000: Christina Aguilera on her concert DVD My Reflection. The singer also recorded an official studio version of the song but ultimately the cover was not included on her album My Kind of Christmas, and remains unreleased.
- 2003: Guy Sebastian's interpretation on Australian Idol season 1 when he performed it on the 1960s theme night (recorded it for the B-side of his #1 single "All I Need Is You")
- 2013: Australian operatic mezzo-soprano Jacqui Dark for ABC Classics as part of a compilation album, I Dreamed a Dream: The Hit Songs of Broadway
- 2015: Jordan Smith on the season nine finale of The Voice
- 2016: Barbra Streisand recorded the song as a duet with Jamie Foxx for her 2016 album Encore: Movie Partners Sing Broadway.
- 2018: Laibach recorded a reinterpretation of the song on their 2018 album The Sound of Music (Laibach album).
- 2019: John Owen-Jones recorded a version of the song on his 2019 album Spotlight.
- 2026: Lucy Thomas recorded a version of the song, available on her YouTube channel.
