= The Magic Is You =

Studio album by Shirley Bassey
- Released: January 1979 (US); 13 April 1979 (UK)
- Recorded: 1978
- Genre: MOR
- Length: 38:23
- Label: United Artists
- Producer: Nick DeCaro

Shirley Bassey chronology
25th Anniversary Album (1978)	The Magic Is You (1979)	All by Myself (1982)

The Magic Is You is a 1979 album by Welsh singer Shirley Bassey. Her final album for United Artists Records, the album notably featured a disco version of her signature 1968 song "This Is My Life".

== Overview ==
Following the UK top three success of her 25th Anniversary Album in late 1978, Bassey followed this up with an album of newly recorded tracks. The lead single (and opening track) from the album was a disco version of one of her signature songs, "This Is My Life (La Vita)". While this was a divergence from her normal output, the rest of the album continued in her more usual MOR style. The album was produced by American producer Nick DeCaro and arranged by DeCaro with Tom Saviano. Cover versions featured on the album included "Don't Cry for Me Argentina", "Anyone Who Had a Heart" and "The Greatest Love of All" – the latter of which had been released by George Benson two years earlier but became a much bigger hit when covered by Whitney Houston some seven years later.

The album was released in the US in January 1979 and garnered a favourable review from Billboard Magazine stating: "In an era of female singers with whispery little-girl voices, it's a treat to hear a lady who can belt out a tune with conviction and dynamics. The songs here allow her to use this power." The album also gained a 3-star review from Allmusic. In the UK, the album was delayed by a further three months possibly to avoid close collision with her previous album, and charted at No.40 in the UK Albums Chart in May 1979. The single "This Is My life (La Vita)" was released on 27 April 1979, but failed to chart. Following this, Bassey recorded and released her third James Bond theme for the film Moonraker, which marked the end of her 1970s output and led to a three-year break from recording.

The Magic Is You was her final album for United Artists Records for which she had recorded throughout the decade. The album was remastered and re-released on CD in 2011 packaged with a 1976 compilation Thoughts of Love. This version contained a bonus track – an extended 12" version of "This Is My Life".

== Track listing ==
Side One

1. "This Is My Life (La Vita)" (Norman Newell, Bruno Canfora, Antonio Amurri)
2. "Better Off Alone" (Bruce Roberts, Carole Bayer Sager)
3. "You Never Done It Like That" (Neil Sedaka, Howard Greenfield)
4. "Don't Cry for Me Argentina" (Andrew Lloyd Webber, Tim Rice)
5. "As We Fall in Love Once More" (Richard Germinaro, Evie Sands, Ben Weisman)

Side Two

1. "Night Moves" (Michael Franks, Michael Small)
2. "Anyone Who Had a Heart" (Burt Bacharach, Hal David)
3. "The Magic Is You" (Stélios Vlavianós, Robert Rupen)
4. "How Insensitive" (Antônio Carlos Jobim, Vinícius de Moraes, Norman Gimbel)
5. "The Greatest Love of All" (Michael Masser, Linda Creed)

== Personnel ==
- Shirley Bassey – vocals
- Nick DeCaro – producer, string and vocal arranger
- John Mills – engineer
- Tom Saviano – assistant arranger
- Hank Cicalo – remixing
- Frank DeCaro – music contractor and album supervisor
- Linda Gerrity – production coordinator
- Bill Burks – art direction
- Francesco Scavullo – photography
