= Lucy Thomas (singer) =

British singer

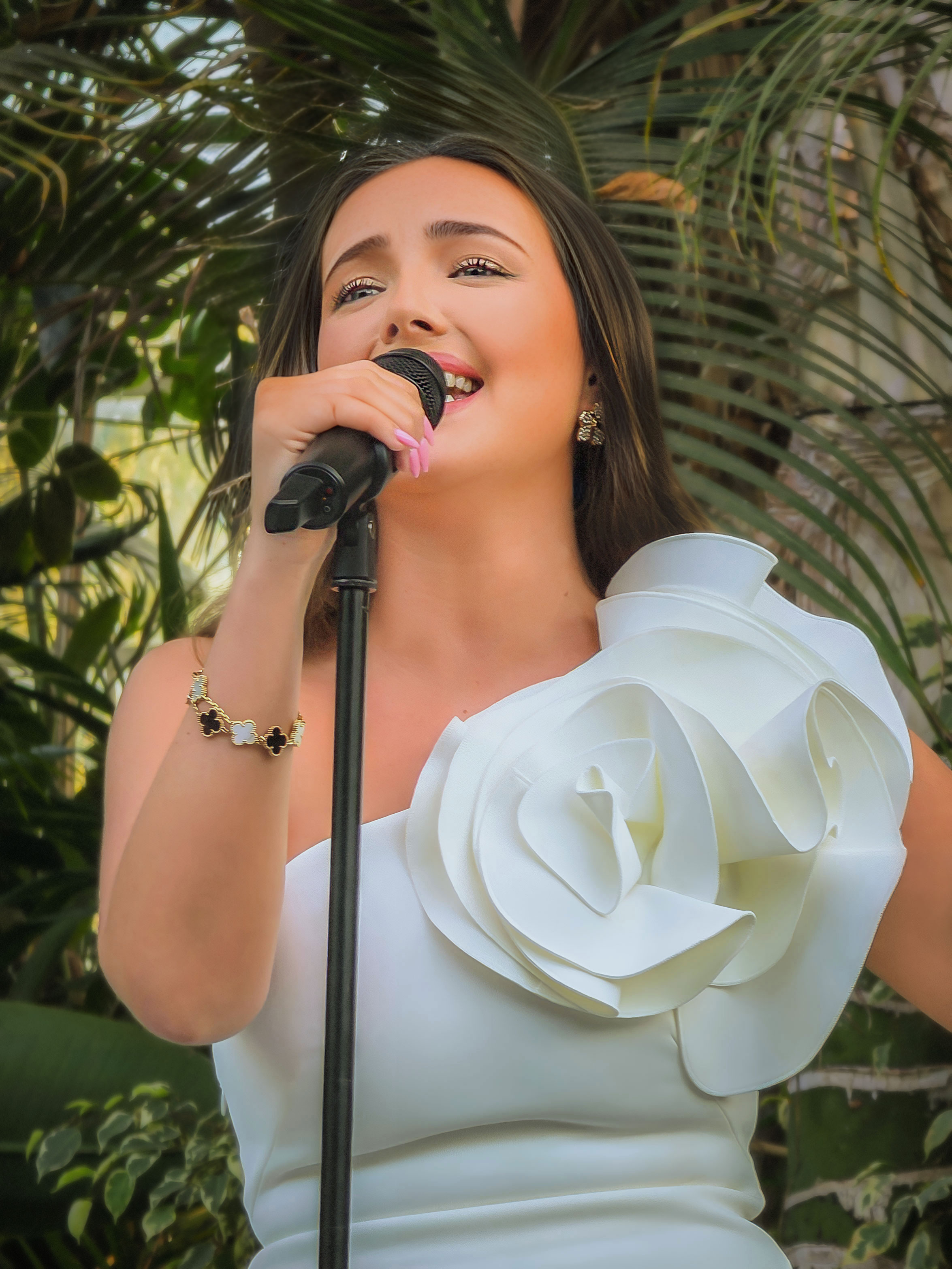

Background information
- Born: 21 February 2004 (age 22); Wigan, Lancashire, England
- Genres: Classical crossover; pop; musical theatre
- Occupation: Singer
- Years active: 2018–present
- Label: Cavendish Records
- Website: www.lucythomasmusic.com

Lucy Thomas (born 21 February 2004) is a British singer from Wigan, Lancashire, England. She gained public recognition for her appearances on talent shows and has since released several albums, primarily in the classical crossover, pop, and musical theatre genres.

== Early life and career beginnings ==
Lucy Thomas was born on 21 February 2004 in Wigan, Lancashire, England. She began singing at a young age, beginning formal lessons at seven years old. She was classically trained and developed a clear and powerful vocal style.

Her first major public appearance came in 2018 when, at the age of 13, she auditioned on the ITV talent show The Voice Kids UK. Later, at age 14, she reached the semi-finals of the show's competition phase. She captivated the judges and audiences with her performances.

== Music career ==
Following her appearance on The Voice Kids, Lucy Thomas was offered a recording contract with Cavendish Records. This led to the release of her debut album, Premiere, on 1 February 2019. Since then, Thomas's discography has expanded rapidly, with a new album typically released each year. Her music often features covers of popular songs, film themes, and Broadway hits, performed in a classical crossover style that showcases her vocal purity and emotional delivery. She has also released original material. Thomas's vocal style is often described as pure, powerful, and captivating. Her music blends elements of pop, classical crossover and musical theatre. She is known for her ability to convey emotion through her interpretations of well-known songs. Her YouTube channel has garnered a significant following, with over 300 million views (as of 2025) for her cover and original song performances, notably "Hallelujah" which has accumulated over 70 million views. Her YouTube channel contains 85 music performance videos, which includes more than 60 videos that have garnered over a million views (as of August 1st 2026). Her channel continues to grow, as does her distribution of audio performances on all major music platforms.

=== Discography ===
- Premiere (2019)
- Encore (2020)
- Timeless (2021)
- Destiny (2022)
- Beyond (2023)
- Rosie The Musical - Original Studio Cast Recording (2024)
- Portrait (2025)

== Live performances and collaborations ==
Lucy Thomas performs regularly and has collaborated with other artists. She made her West End debut in October 2024, singing songs from the musical "Rosie" (for which she also recorded the original studio cast recording), as well as other musical theatre hits, accompanied by a 30-piece orchestra and guest vocalists Will Callan and Milan Van Waardenburg.
