= Nello Segurini =

Italian composer, conductor, and pianist

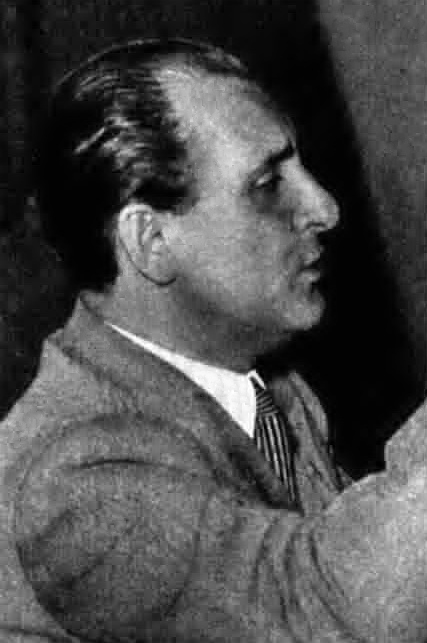
- Born: 1 January 1910; Milan, Italy
- Died: 26 May 1988 (aged 78); Rome, Italy

Nello Segurini (1 January 1910 – 26 May 1988) was an Italian composer, conductor, and pianist.

== Life and career ==
Born in Milan, Segurini was a child prodigy, who made his first piano concert at La Scala at 9 years old. First at EIAR and later at RAI, he directed the symphony orchestras of Milan, Naples and Turin. He served as the official conductor at the first editions of the Sanremo Music Festival, together with Cinico Angelini. In the 1960s Segurini moved to Canada, where he directed several operas and also started a local radio station. He also long toured in Soviet Union. He returned to Italy a few years before his death, living in Lavinio.

Segurini was a prolific composer who was active in almost every musical genre. His compositions include operas, pop songs, operettas, film scores, mambo music, waltz compositions, incidental music.
