= Moonraker (soundtrack) =

Soundtrack album by John Barry
- Released: 2 October 1979
- Recorded: April 1979
- Length: 30:54
- Label: United Artists
- Producer: John Barry

John Barry chronology
The Deep (1977)	Moonraker (1979)	Hanover Street (1979)

Professional ratings
Review scores
Source	Rating
AllMusic	3/5 stars

Moonraker is the 1979 soundtrack for the eleventh James Bond film of the same name.

Moonraker was the third of the three Bond films for which the theme song was performed by Shirley Bassey, after Goldfinger (1964) and Diamonds Are Forever (1971). Frank Sinatra was considered for the vocals, before Johnny Mathis was approached and offered the opportunity. Mathis was unhappy about the song and withdrew from the project, leaving the producers scrambling for a replacement. Paul Williams recorded an early version of the title theme with different lyrics that were not used in the final version. Kate Bush declined as she was due to embark on her British The Tour of Life, so John Barry offered the song to Bassey just weeks before the release date. As a result, Bassey made the recordings at very short notice and never regarded the song 'as her own' as she had never had the chance to perform it or promote it first. Indeed, Bassey has seldom performed the song live in comparison to her other two Bond themes, "Goldfinger" and "Diamonds Are Forever". The film uses two versions of the title theme song, a ballad version heard over the main titles, and a disco version for the end titles. Confusingly, the United Artists single release labelled the tracks on the 7" single as "Moonraker (Main Title)" for the version used to close the film and "Moonraker (End Title)" for the track that opened the film. The song failed to make any real impact on the charts, which may partly be attributed to Bassey's failure to promote the single, given the last minute decision and the way in which it was quickly recorded to meet the schedule.

In November 2024, La La Land Records released a limited expanded edition containing previously unreleased music.

== Composition ==
As with Louis Armstrong's "We Have All the Time in the World" from On Her Majesty's Secret Service in 1969, Hal David wrote the lyrics. Paul Williams's original lyrics were discarded. Retrospective reviews have ranked "Moonraker" as one of the better James Bond theme songs overall, however it is regarded as the weakest of the three Bond theme songs performed by Shirley Bassey.

"Moonraker (Main Title)"
A 19-second sample of "Moonraker (Main Title)", the opening track. Rolling Stone praised Bassey's vocal performance, noting how she was "one of the only Earthlings who could croon a nonsense word like 'Moonraker' and make it sound downright glorious".

Finally in 2005, Bassey sang the song for the first time outside of James Bond on stage as part of a medley of her three Bond title songs along with "Goldfinger" and "Diamonds Are Forever". An instrumental strings version of the title theme was used in 2007 tourism commercials for the Dominican Republic.

The score for Moonraker marked a turning point in Barry's output, abandoning the Kentonesque brass of his earlier Bond scores and instead scoring the film with slow, rich string passages—a trend which Barry would continue in the 1980s with scores such as Raise the Titanic, Out of Africa and Somewhere in Time.

Moonraker uses for the first time since Diamonds Are Forever a piece of music called "007" (briefly, and late in track 7, "Bond Arrives in Rio and Boat Chase"), the secondary Bond theme composed by Barry which was introduced in From Russia with Love. This is the only time when the "007 Theme" is used in a Roger Moore Bond film; it is as of 2021 the last time it has been heard in a Bond film. Another link between the soundtracks of Moonraker and Diamonds Are Forever is the inclusion of a track titled "Bond Smells a Rat". (Never Say Never Again, Sean Connery’s last Bond film in 1983, also has a track of that title.) There is also strong use of a choir in the space sequences (a choir was briefly heard in the track "Slumber Inc." on the Diamonds Are Forever soundtrack). Barry used a choir to great effect on The Lion in Winter (1968).

Unusually, the score was recorded in Paris—all of Barry's previous Bond scores had been recorded at London's CTS Studios. The film's production base was in France and it was decided the film would be scored there as well.

== Track listing ==
=== 1979 release ===
1. "Moonraker (Main Title)" – Shirley Bassey (3:10)
2. "Space Lazer Battle" (2:47)
3. "Miss Goodhead Meets Bond" (2:48)
4. "Cable Car and Snake Fight" (3:07)
5. "Bond Lured to Pyramid" (2:02)
6. "Flight into Space" (6:27)
7. "Bond Arrives in Rio and Boat Chase" (2:38) (Contains "007" Theme)
8. "Centrifuge and Corrine Put Down" (2:35)
9. "Bond Smells a Rat" (2:24)
10. "Moonraker (End Title)" – Shirley Bassey (2:27)

=== 2024 release ===
==== Disc 1 ====
1. "Gun Barrel and Hijackers" (1:25) (Contains The James Bond Theme)
2. "Last Leg and Freefall Sequence" (2:23) (Contains The James Bond Theme)
3. "Main Title – Moonraker" (Performed by Shirley Bassey) (3:12)
4. "California and the Drax Residence" (1:36)
5. "Look After Mr. Bond and Chang’s Entry" (1:34) (Contains The James Bond Theme)
6. "Centrifuge" (1:09)
7. "You Presume a Great Deal, Mr. Bond" (1:19)
8. "18-Carat" (1:30)
9. "Corrine Put Down" (1:30)
10. "Venini Glass and Bond Follows Holly" (2:01) (Contains The James Bond Theme)
11. "Funeral Barge – Venice Boat Chase" (3:15) (Contains The James Bond Theme)
12. "Bond Smells a Rat (Extended Version)" (2:31)
13. "It Could Have Its Compensations" (1:23)
14. "Bond Arrives in Rio" (1:08)
15. "Cable Car Fight" (1:58)
16. "Hello Dolly (Romeo & Juliet)" (0:54)
17. "The Magnificent Seven" (0:46)
18. "South American Boat Chase and Hang Glider Crash" (1:58) (Contains "007" Theme)
19. "Bond Lured to Pyramid (Film Version)" (2:10)
20. "Snake Fight" (1:12)
21. "Launch Program Commence and I Bid You Farewell" (2:26)
22. "Flight Into Space" (6:27)
23. "Marines Get Ready and Emergency Stop" (1:44)
24. "Space Laser Battle" (2:47)
25. "Jaws and Dolly Reunited and Jaws Lends a Hand" (1:40)
26. "Globes Destroyed" (2:38)
27. "End Title – Moonraker (Extended Version)" (Performed by Shirley Bassey) (2:48)
28. "Moonraker (Instrumental)" (3:14)
29. "Prelude, Op. 28, No. 15 (“Raindrop”)" (0:56)
30. "Bugle Call" (0:23)
31. "Mardi Gras" (4:39)
32. "Morning After" (2:34)
33. "Gregorian Chant" (0:48)
34. "Funeral Barge – Venice Boat Chase (Alternate Mix)" (3:15) (Contains The James Bond Theme)
35. "Emergency Stop (Film Ending)" (1:12)
36. "Intro to End Title" (0:25)

==== Disc 2 ====
1. "Main Title – Moonraker" (Performed by Shirley Bassey) (3:10)
2. "Space Laser Battle" (2:47)
3. "Miss Goodhead Meets Bond" (2:46)
4. "Cable Car and Snake Fight" (3:06)
5. "Bond Lured to Pyramid" (2:04)
6. "Flight Into Space" (6:28)
7. "Bond Arrives in Rio and Boat Chase" (2:37) (Contains "007" Theme)
8. "Centrifuge and Corrine Put Down" (2:35)
9. "Bond Smells a Rat" (2:22)
10. "End Title – Moonraker (Performed by Shirley Bassey)" (2:33)
11. "Moonraker (Early Lyrics, Slow Version)" (Performed by Paul Williams) (4:13)
12. "Main Title – Moonraker (Alternate Instrumental)" (3:02)
13. "Moonraker (Early Lyrics) (Performed by Paul Williams)" (3:18)
14. "End Title – Moonraker (Alternate Instrumental)" (3:00)

Some familiar pieces of music also appear in the film:

- Frédéric Chopin's Prelude no. 15 in D-flat major (op. 28), "Raindrop"): Hugo Drax (Michel Lonsdale) playing a piano when James Bond (Roger Moore) arrives.
- Richard Strauss' "Also sprach Zarathustra" (op. 30) (associated with 2001: A Space Odyssey): a hunting horn plays its distinctive first three notes.
- Tritsch-Tratsch-Polka by Johann Strauss II: during the hovercraft scene on Saint Mark's Square.
- The alien-contacting theme "Wild Notes" from Close Encounters of the Third Kind: as the key-code for a security door.
- Pyotr Ilyich Tchaikovsky's Romeo and Juliet Overture: when Jaws (Richard Kiel) meets Dolly (Blanche Ravalec).
- Elmer Bernstein's theme from The Magnificent Seven: when Bond appears on horseback in gaucho clothing.

== In popular culture ==
- The main title's opening notes were used in a 2007 tourism commercial for the Dominican Republic.

== See also ==
- Outline of James Bond
