= The Old Fashioned Way (song) =

Song by Charles Aznavour
- Language: French, English
- Released: 1973
- Recorded: 1973
- Genre: Chanson
- Songwriter(s): Charles Aznavour

"The Old Fashioned Way" is the English version of Charles Aznavour's Les plaisirs démodés song. The song was released in 1973 by Barclay Records as a single (What makes a Man on the B-side) and became a hit in the Netherlands (No. 5), Belgium and in the UK (it was on British charts for 15 weeks).

== Other performers ==
- Fred Astaire
- Mantovani Orchestra
- Petula Clark
- Frank Sinatra
- Shirley Bassey
- Helen Reddy
- Liberace

== As a film soundtrack ==
- Eyes Wide Shut (1999) (performed by Victor Silvester Orchestra)
- Jake Spanner, Private Eye (1989) (TV)
- The Muppet Show, Episode #1.9 (1976)
- Ten Little Indians (1974)

== Discography ==
- 40 chansons d'or
