= Reach for the Stars (Shirley Bassey song) =

Single by Shirley Bassey
- B-side: "Climb Ev'ry Mountain"
- Released: 1961
- Recorded: 1961
- Genre: Pop
- Label: Columbia
- Songwriters: Udo Jürgens; Norman Newell (English lyrics)
- Producer: Norman Newell

"Reach for the Stars" is a song made popular by Shirley Bassey, and written by Austrian pop singer/songwriter Udo Jürgens (with English lyrics by Norman Newell). As a double A-side single (b/w "Climb Ev'ry Mountain") it went to No. 1 in the UK Singles Chart for one week in September 1961.
