= Never Never Never =

Studio album by Shirley Bassey
- Released: May 1973
- Recorded: December 1972
- Genre: MOR, pop
- Length: 39:03
- Label: United Artists
- Producer: Noel Rogers

Shirley Bassey chronology
And I Love You So (1972)	Never Never Never (1973)	Live at Carnegie Hall (1973)

Official audio title track
- "Never, Never, Never" on YouTube

Never Never Never is a 1973 album by Shirley Bassey. It features the hit single title track, which was a UK top 10 hit, which became one of Bassey's best-known songs. The album also became a top 10 hit in the UK and was a moderate hit in the US.

== Overview ==
Released in May 1973, this album saw a peak in the Shirley Bassey career revival that she was experiencing during the early 1970s. The album's lead single, "Never, Never, Never" had been a hit, reaching No. 8 in the UK Charts and remaining in the top 50 for 19 weeks, becoming one of her biggest and most well-known hits. It also performed well in the US, becoming her only single to make three different charts: No. 48 on the Billboard Hot 100, No. 8 on the Adult Contemporary Chart, and No. 67 on the R&B Chart. Also included were covers of contemporary hits such as "Baby I'm-a Want You", "Killing Me Softly with His Song" and "No Regrets" - the latter sharing the title with another song Bassey had recorded and released in the 1960s. Closing track, "Make the World a Little Younger" was released as the album's second and final single.

The original release was in stereo on vinyl (with a gatefold sleeve), and cassette. Photography for this album was by Lord Snowdon. It was released in the US with an alternative cover. The album was released in remastered form by BGO Records in a double CD pack, together with her 1975 album Good, Bad but Beautiful in 2005. The US version was released alone on CD in 2006.

== Critical reception ==
Of the album Billboard magazine said the album was "a superb production" made "with care and love and showcasing Shirley's outstanding vocal range, supplemented by a large orchestra". At the time of release, Bassey was in the middle of a national US tour. In an accompanying booklet of the sheet music for the album, the write-up stated; "with the release of her hit album Never, Never, Never, Shirley Bassey has reached the pinnacle of an ever growing popularity, both as a recording artist and performer".

In its May 1973 issue, Gramophone reviewed Never, Never, Never, describing it as one of Bassey's finest albums to date. The review noted that Bassey paid greater attention to light, shade, and the nuances of first-rate song material, including "Baby I'm-A Want You," "I Won't Last A Day Without You," and "Killing Me Softly With His Song." The critic found that a reduction in her characteristically sustained fervor, combined with the discerning arrangements of Arthur Greenslade, Johnny Harris, and Chris Gunning, resulted in an album of indisputable star quality.

== Commercial performance ==
The album followed the single and similarly entered the top 10 in the UK, peaking at No. 10 during a 10-week run, and would go on to earn a silver disc. It was also a hit in the US, peaking at No. 60 on the Billboard 200, and No. 34 on the R&B Chart.

== Track listing ==
Side One

1. "Never, Never, Never" (Tony Renis, Alberto Testa, Norman Newell) - 3:13
2. "Baby I'm-a Want You" (David Gates) - 2:44
3. "Someone Who Cares" (Alex Harvey) - 2:53
4. "The Old Fashioned Way" (Georges Garvarentz, Al Kasha, Charles Aznavour, Joel Hirschorn) - 3:06
5. "I Won't Last a Day Without You" (Paul Williams, Roger Nichols) - 3:31
6. "Somehow" (Larry Grossman, Hal Hackady) - 2:24

Side Two

1. "There's No Such Thing as Love" (Ian Fraser, Anthony Newley, George Hackney) - 3:00
2. "Killing Me Softly with His Song" (Norman Gimbel, Charles Fox) - 4:40
3. "Going, Going, Gone" (John Barry, Alan Jay Lerner) - 2:13
4. "No Regrets" (Tom Rush) - 4:29
5. "Together" (Graham Gouldman) - 3:16
6. "Make The World a Little Younger" (Terry Howell, Karen O'Hara, Denny McReynolds) - 3:34

== Personnel ==
- Shirley Bassey – vocals
- John Harris – musical director, arranger and conductor
- Arthur Greenslade – arranger and conductor
- Chris Gunning – arranger and conductor

Technical

- John Timperley, Martin Rushent, Roger Cameron – engineers
- Lord Snowdon – photography
- Pierre Tubbs – art direction

== Charts ==
=== Weekly charts ===
Chart (1973)	Peak position
Australia Albums (Kent Music Report)	4
UK Albums (OCC)	10
US Billboard 200	60
US Top R&B/Hip-Hop Albums (Billboard)	34

Chart (2025)	Peak position
Hungarian Physical Albums (MAHASZ)	35

=== Year-end charts ===
Chart (1973)	Position
Australia Albums (Kent Music Report)	16

== Certifications and sales ==
Region	Certification	Certified units/sales
United Kingdom (BPI)	Silver	60,000^{^}
^{^} Shipments figures based on certification alone.
