= The Fabulous Shirley Bassey =

Studio album by Shirley Bassey
- Released: 1959
- Recorded: 1959
- Genre: Vocal
- Label: EMI/Columbia
- Producer: Norman Newell

Shirley Bassey chronology
The Bewitching Miss Bassey (1959)	The Fabulous Shirley Bassey (1959)	Shirley (1961)

Professional ratings
Review scores
Source	Rating
AllMusic	4/5 stars

The Fabulous Shirley Bassey is the third studio album by Welsh singer Shirley Bassey and her first for Columbia Records. It was recorded with Geoff Love and his orchestra and peaked at number 12 in the UK album chart in early 1961. Released in 1959, this was the first studio album by Bassey composed completely of new material. Her two previous albums, issued on the Philips label, were collections of new recordings and previously released material, recorded between 1956 and 1958.

The album was issued in mono and stereo. In 1997, the Dutch company Disky issued a two-CD set entitled Original Gold, with four tracks from the album: "A Foggy Day in London Town", "April in Paris", "The Man That Got Away" and "They Can't Take That Away from Me", with all being previously unavailable on CD at the time. EMI at Abbey Road in London provided the mono masters, instead of stereo, for this release. Unlike other artists, such as Cliff Richard and the Beatles, EMI did not re-issue any complete Shirley Bassey album in mono on CD. The stereo version of the album was issued on CD in 1999 by EMI.

== Track listing ==
Side One.

1. "A Foggy Day in London Town" (George Gershwin, Ira Gershwin) – 3:11
2. "I've Got You Under My Skin" (Cole Porter) – 3:33
3. "Cry Me a River" (Arthur Hamilton) – 3:28
4. "April in Paris" (E. Y. Harburg, Vernon Duke) – 2:55
5. "I've Never Been in Love Before" (Frank Loesser) – 3:40
6. "The Man That Got Away" (Harold Arlen, Ira Gershwin) – 4:03

Side Two.

1. "'S Wonderful" (George Gershwin, Ira Gershwin) – 2:15
2. "I'll Remember April" (Don Raye, Gene de Paul, Patricia Johnston) – 4:07
3. "Easy to Love" (Cole Porter) – 3:03
4. "No One Ever Tells You" (Carroll Coates, Hubbard Atwood) – 2:54
5. "They Can't Take that Away from Me" (George Gershwin, Ira Gershwin) – 3:11
6. "The Party's Over" (Jule Styne, Adolph Green, Betty Comden) – 3:31

== Personnel ==
- Shirley Bassey – vocal
- Geoff Love – arranger, conductor
- Geoff Love and his Orchestra – orchestra

== Charts ==
Chart (1961)	Peak position
UK Albums (OCC)	12
