= If I Never Sing Another Song =

Song written by Don Black & Udo Jürgens

Song
- Language: German, English
- Genre: Traditional Pop, Vocal
- Label: (Illusionen) (In German)
- Lyricists: Don Black, Udo Jürgens

"If I Never Sing Another Song" is a pop ballad lyrics written originally by Alexandra. She named it “Illusionen” (Translation from German to English; Illusions). Contributions and changes were made later by Don Black and original composer Udo Jürgens. English singer Matt Monro was the first to record and release the song in English, with John Burgess producing it.

== Background ==
The song was first written in German in 1967 by Udo Jürgens and Alexandra, who sang the song herself.

The meaning behind the song is about a "superstar who has enjoyed the spotlight and heard all the applause the world has ever made" but being okay with not being able to reach the heights again as he "has tasted everything that fame could bring". It encapsulates being in the twilight of a singers' career.

"If I Never Sing Another Song"

Single by Matt Monro

from the album If I Never Sing Another Song
- Language: English
- Genre: pop, easy-listening, Vocal
- Length: 3:48
- Label: Columbia
- Producer: John Burgess

== Matt Monro version ==
In 1977, Don Black translated the lyrics in English and reworked it. He had previously worked with Monro and had written them originally for him, with help from Udo Jürgens. It was first offered to Frank Sinatra, who turned it down.

Matt Monro sang the song on Saturday Night At The Mill in February 1978, prior to its official release in March 1979, when Matt Monro released the album If I Never Sing Another Song.

== Other versions ==
In 1976 Shirley Bassey recorded the song on her album Love, Life and Feelings.

In 1980, Joe Longthorne created his own version of the song, becoming one of his most famous songs. A production was made by Vegas Films, which was written and produced by Film director Paul Lacovou.

In 1995, Matt Monro's son, Matt Monro Jnr, released his own version of "If I Never Sing Another Song". He released it alongside a collection of Matt Monro songs, such as On Days Like These, as rearranged duets of himself and his father.

Singers who would also sing "If I never Sing Another Song", usually as their closing number, are Sammy Davis Jr, Johnnie Ray and Frankie Laine.
