= This Is My Life (Shirley Bassey album) =

1968 studio album by Shirley Bassey

Studio album by Shirley Bassey
- Released: 1968
- Recorded: 1968
- Genre: Vocal
- Label: United Artists
- Producer: Dave Pell

Shirley Bassey chronology
12 of Those Songs (1968)	This Is My Life (1968)	Does Anybody Miss Me (1969)

Professional ratings
Review scores
Source	Rating
AllMusic	3.5/5 stars

This Is My Life is a 1968 album by Shirley Bassey. The mid to late sixties was a period of declining popularity for traditional pop. How much the changing tastes in popular music directly affected Bassey's record sales is difficult to quantify; but her record sales had been faltering since the latter part of the mid 1960s, and the album failed to chart (She did have some success in Italy during this period, where she recorded several songs in Italian, with two making the Top 40 there).

The version of "This Is My Life" appearing on side two is the English-only version, with lyrics by Norman Newell, and would become one of Bassey's signature songs.

The original album was issued in mono and stereo. The stereo version of this album has been released on CD twice, firstly, in the late 1990s, on the EMI 2-CD set Shirley Bassey The Collection and a digitally re-mastered release for CD in 2009 together with Does Anybody Miss Me by BGO Records.

== Track listing ==
Side one

1. "Now You Want To Be Loved" ("Des Ronds Dans L'Eau") (Pierre Barouh, Raymond Le Sénéchal, Sonny Miller) - 2.55
2. Medley
  - "Goin' Out of My Head" (Teddy Randazzo, Bobby Weinstein)
  - "You Go to My Head" (John Frederick Coots, Haven Gillespie) - 2.53
3. "Softly as I Leave You" (Hal Shaper, Tony De Vita) - 2.27
4. "A Time for Us" (Larry Kusik, Eddie Snyder, Nino Rota) - 2.27
5. "The Joker" (Leslie Bricusse, Anthony Newley) - 2.25
6. "I Must Know" (Neal Hefti, Lil Mattis) - 2.40

Side two

1. "This Is My Life (La vita)" (Bruno Canfora, Antonio Amurri, Norman Newell) - 3.07
2. "Who Am I?" (Tony Hatch, Jackie Trent) - 2.37
3. "Funny Girl" (Bob Merrill, Jule Styne) - 2.23
4. "Sunny" (Bobby Hebb) - 2.42
5. "I've Been Loved" (Sammy Cahn, Andy Badale) - 2.54
6. "Where Is Tomorrow?" (Umberto Bindi, Barry Mason) - 2.39

== Italian version ==
This Is My Life (La vita)

Studio album by Shirley Bassey
- Released: 1968
- Recorded: 1968
- Genre: Vocal
- Label: United Artists
- Producer: Norman Newell, Dave Pell

Shirley Bassey chronology
This Is My Life (1968)	This Is My Life (La vita) (1968)	Does Anybody Miss Me (1969)

In Italy, a different version titled This Is My Life (La vita) was released in 1968.

=== Description ===
Bassey had started living as a tax exile in 1968, and was not permitted to work in Britain for two years. In 1968 Bassey performed at the Sanremo Music Festival in Italy singing the song "La vita". This song was originally written by Bruno Canfora, with (Italian) lyrics by Antonio Amurri. For the song Bassey sang at the festival, the lyrics were partially rewritten in English by Norman Newell.

Side one of the album included only Italian songs with the exception of "La vita" which is the version with a mix of Italian and English lyrics. Side two is an edited version of the This Is My Life album that was released in Britain and the USA, with the addition of "To Give" which was only included in this album and on a single. Of the six songs recorded in Italian on this album only "La vita" has had a CD release. It appeared on the 1994 boxset Bassey - The EMI/UA Years 1959 - 1979. While in exile Bassey recorded several songs that were exclusively released in Italy and also performed frequently on Italian television.

In the next step in the evolution of "La vita," Newell wrote English lyrics for the remaining Italian parts and the result was "This Is My Life." This English-only version became one of Bassey's signature songs, often the final encore that she performs in concert.

This album was released in stereo and has identical front cover art to the 1968 UK This Is My Life but has "La vita" under "This Is My Life," and the different songlist.

=== Track listing ===
Side one

1. "La vita" (Bruno Canfora, Antonio Amurri, Norman Newell)
2. "Pronto...sono io" (Vito Pallavicini, Memo Remigi)
3. "Domani, domani" (Vito Pallavicini, Pino Donaggio)
4. "Epirops" (Rossella Conz, Pino Massara)
5. "Chi si vuol bene come noi..." (Vito Pallavicini, Domenico Modugno)
6. "E' giorno" (Cristiano Minellono, Tony De Vita)

Side two

1. "Now You Want to Be Loved" (Pierre Barouh, Raymond Lesenechal)
2. "A Time for Us" (Nino Rota, Larry Kusik, Eddie Snyder)
3. "Softly as I Leave You" (Giorgio Calabrese, Tony De Vita, Hal Shaper))
4. "To Give" (Bob Crewe, Bob Gaudio)
5. "The Joker" (Leslie Bricusse, Anthony Newley)
6. "I Must Know" (Neal Hefti, Lil Mattis)
