= Goldfinger (Shirley Bassey song) =

- A-side label of the UK single

Single by Shirley Bassey

from the album Goldfinger
- B-side: "Strange How Love Can Be"
- Released: 1964
- Recorded: 7 September 1964
- Studio: EMI, London
- Genre: Orchestral pop; jazz
- Length: 2:48
- Label: EMI
- Composer: John Barry
- Lyricists: Leslie Bricusse, Anthony Newley
- Producer: George Martin

Shirley Bassey singles chronology
"Who Can I Turn To?" (1964)	"Goldfinger" (1964)	"Now" (1964)

Alternative release
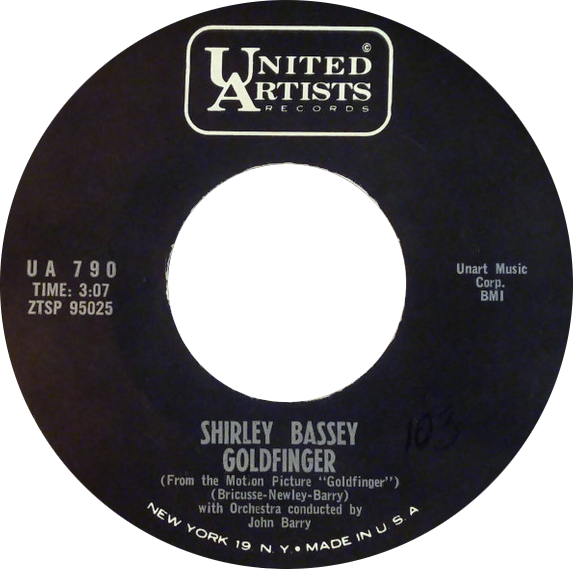
- A-side label of the US single

James Bond theme singles chronology
"From Russia With Love" (1963)	"Goldfinger" (1964)	"Thunderball" (1965)

"Goldfinger" is the title song from the 1964 James Bond film of the same name. Composed and arranged by John Barry and with lyrics by Leslie Bricusse and Anthony Newley, the song was performed by Shirley Bassey for the film's opening and closing title sequences, as well as the soundtrack album release. The single release of the song gave Bassey her only Billboard Hot 100 top forty hit, peaking in the Top 10 at No. 8 and No. 2 for four weeks on the Adult Contemporary chart, and in the United Kingdom the single reached No. 21 on the UK Singles Chart.

The song finished at No. 53 in AFI's 100 Years...100 Songs survey of top tunes in American cinema. In 2008, the single was inducted into the Grammy Hall of Fame.

== Background ==
One source of inspiration was the song "Mack the Knife", which Goldfinger director Guy Hamilton showed composer John Barry, thinking it was a "gritty and rough" song that could be a good model for what the film required. Lyricists Leslie Bricusse and Anthony Newley were not shown any film footage or script excerpts, but were advised of the fatal gilding suffered by the Jill Masterson character, played by Shirley Eaton. Bricusse later recalled that once he and Newley hit upon utilizing "the Midas touch" in the lyric, the pattern of the song became evident and the lyrics were completed within a couple of days at most.

The first recording of "Goldfinger" was made by Newley on 14 May 1964, with Barry as conductor, which produced two completed takes. Barry recalled that Newley gave a "very creepy" performance which he (Barry) considered "terrific". Newley's recording, however, was made purely as a demo for the film's makers. According to Barry, Newley "didn't want to sing it in the movie as they [Newley and Bricusse] thought the song was a bit weird".

Shirley Bassey was Barry's choice to record the song. He had been the conductor on Bassey's national tour in December 1963 and the two had also been romantically involved. Barry had played Bassey an instrumental track of the song before its lyrics were written. The singer recalled that hearing the track had given her "goose bumps". She agreed to sing the song whatever the lyrics might eventually be. Bassey recorded the track on 7 September 1964 at London's EMI Recording Studios. The producer credit named Bassey's regular producer George Martin, but the session was, in fact, overseen by Barry. Vic Flick, Jimmy Page, John Paul Jones and Big Jim Sullivan are all said to have been at the sessions.

"Goldfinger"
A 16.5-second sample of "Goldfinger". The song has been widely praised by modern critics: Variety called it the "gold standard of all movie music", while Rolling Stone named it the best Bond theme song.

Page recalls attending the sessions, but session musicians on the James Bond films were separately relegated to the instrumental score versions of songs, while the main musicians (on Goldfinger: Vic Flick) were given the main theme song to solely record, to be featured at the beginning of the film, leaving Page as a background acoustic contributor to Flick on the instrumental version of the song.

The recording of "Goldfinger" lasted all night because Barry demanded repeated takes, not due to any shortcomings in Bassey's vocal, but musical or technical glitches. Initially, Bassey had problems with the climactic final note, which necessitated her slipping behind a studio partition between takes to remove her bra. Bassey said of the final note: "I was holding it and holding it – I was looking at John Barry and I was going blue in the face and he's going – hold it just one more second. When it finished, I nearly passed out."

The iconic two-note phrase which is the basis for the song's introduction was not in the original orchestration, but occurred to Barry during a tea-break, following an hour and a half of rehearsal. By the time the musicians returned, twenty minutes later, he had written the figure into the orchestration.

The single was released in mono, with the album stereo version (on the film soundtrack, Golden Hits Of Shirley Bassey and subsequent releases) using an alternate mix, in which the instrumentals are the same, but Bassey's vocal is different, being a shade less intense and having a shorter final note. Newley's version was released in 1992 to mark the 30th anniversary of James Bond on film, in a compilation collector's edition, The Best of Bond... James Bond.

Bassey's title theme was almost taken out of the film because producer Harry Saltzman hated it, saying, "That's the worst ******* song I've ever heard in my ******* life". Saltzman also disliked Bassey's subsequent Bond theme for Diamonds Are Forever. However, there was not enough time for a replacement song to be written and recorded.

== Release ==
The release on vinyl of Bassey's (mono) version, peaked at No. 8 on the US Billboard Hot 100 in the United States and reached No. 1 in Japan, No. 4 in Australia, and Top 10 in many European countries including Austria (No. 7), Belgium (No. 9 on the Dutch charts), Germany (No. 8), Italy (No. 3), the Netherlands (No. 5), and Norway (No. 7). A No. 24 hit in France, Bassey's "Goldfinger" was not one of Bassey's biggest hits in her native UK, its No. 21 peak on the UK Singles Chart being far lower than that of the nine Top 10 hits she'd previously scored, but despite Bassey subsequently returning to the UK Top 10 three more times, "Goldfinger" would ultimately become her signature song in the UK as well as the rest of the world. In 2002 poll in which BBC Radio 2 solicited listeners' favourite piece of popular music from the last fifty years performed by a British act, "Goldfinger" by Shirley Bassey ranked at No. 46.

== Other versions and adaptations ==
=== Re-recordings ===
Bassey re-recorded "Goldfinger" for her 2014 album Hello Like Before. In doing so she addressed two notes that she thought "sounded wrong" in the original.

=== Recorded covers ===
- In 1964, Billy Strange recorded a version for his album The James Bond Theme / Walk Don't Run '64, which even charted along with Bassey's original.
- In 1965, John Barry and His Orchestra hit #72 on the Billboard Hot 100 with the instrumental title song from the movie.
- In 1965, The Honeycombs did an instrumental cover of the song on their Japanese tour which also appeared on their album In Tokyo which was released in Japan only.
- In 1965, Count Basie did an instrumental version of the song on his album Basie Meets Bond.
- In 1965, Teresa Brewer did a version of the song on her album Goldfinger, Dear Heart & Other Great Movie Songs.
- In 1965, Hugo Winterhalter did an instrumental version of the song on his album The Big Hits Of 1965.
- In 1965, Jimmy Smith did an instrumental jazz organ version of the song on his album Monster, released on the Verve Records label. The recording included a full big band arrangement by Oliver Nelson. It was also released as a two-sided single that same year as "Goldfinger (Part I)" and Goldfinger (Part II)".
- In 1965, Ray Barretto did an instrumental version of the song on his album Señor 007.
- In 1965, Billy Preston did an instrumental version of the song on his album Early Hits of 1965.
- In 1965, Enoch Light and The Light Brigade did an instrumental version of the song on the album Discoteque Vol. 2: Dance, Dance, Dance.
- In 1965, Harry James recorded a version on the album Harry James Plays Green Onions & Other Great Hits. (Dot DLP 3634 and DLP 25634).
- In 1967, Eino Grön recorded the Finnish rendering "Hän Vaatii" ("He Required") for his self-titled album.
- In 1967, Mantovani recorded an orchestral version on the album Mantovani/Hollywood.
- In 1978, the song was covered by Howard Devoto's post-punk band Magazine, as the B-side to their single "Touch and Go", with both songs later being added to the 2007 reissue of their 1978 album Real Life.
- In 1996, Man or Astroman? did an instrumental version of the song on the various-artists compilation Secret Agent S.O.U.N.D.S..
- In 1998, Sexmob recorded an instrumental jazz version of the song on their album Din of Inequity.
- In 2000, Hank Marvin did an instrumental version of the song on his album Marvin at the Movies.
- In 2006, it was covered in a heavy metal fashion by Finnish rock group Leningrad Cowboys on their album Zombies Paradise.
- In 2008, Canadian author Mark Steyn released "Goldfinger" on an album of the same name.
- In 2012, for the James Bond video game 007 Legends, an instrumental version was written and composed by David Arnold for the main title sequence, celebrating the 50th anniversary of the film franchise.
- In 2016, Finnish singer, and former Nightwish vocalist Tarja Turunen released a cover of the song on her album The Brightest Void
- In 2017, guitarist Bill Frisell and bassist Thomas Morgan made a live recording of the song which was released on their album Small Town for ECM.
- In 2017, "Goldfinger" was covered on Bob Kulick's solo album Skeletons in the Closet.

=== Live and televised performances ===
- In 1965, Connie Francis performed the song on The Ed Sullivan Show
- In 1980, Shirley Bassey performed the song on The Muppet Show.
- In 1997, Tom Petty and the Heartbreakers covered the song (without vocals) in concert at The Fillmore, and it is featured on their 2009 career-spanning live set, The Live Anthology. It was again featured in 2022 on the album Live at the Fillmore 1997.
- In 2002, Shirley Bassey sang the song at the British pop/rock music concert Party at the Palace in of the Golden Jubilee of Queen Elizabeth II held over the Golden Jubilee Weekend.
- In 2011, Céline Dion included the song as part of a "James Bond Medley" in her Las Vegas show Celine.
- In 2013, Shirley Bassey sang the song at the 85th Academy Awards in tribute to the 50 years of James Bond films.

=== Soundtrack appearances ===
- In 1998, the song was to feature prominently in the film Little Voice, appearing in much the manner of its first use – but with Ray Say (Michael Caine) slamming the door that becomes the song's first chord blast, rather than, of course, James Bond actor Sean Connery.
- In 1999, in the sixth season "Shutout in Seattle" episode of US sitcom Frasier, the song is featured in the final scene, with Frasier Crane (Kelsey Grammer), Niles Crane (David Hyde Pierce) and Martin Crane (John Mahoney) singing along to a piano accompaniment.
- The song is performed onscreen by Sharon Jones & the Dap-Kings at Jordan Belfort (Leonardo DiCaprio) and Naomi Lapaglia (Margot Robbie)'s wedding in the 2013 film The Wolf of Wall Street.

=== Remixes and samples ===
- In 1999, the Mantovani version of the song was sampled by Smash Mouth for their song "Then the Morning Comes", from the album Astro Lounge.
- In 2000, the song was remixed by Propellerheads for The Remix Album...Diamonds Are Forever.
- In 2007, it was interpolated by reggaeton artist Tego Calderón on his song "Alegría", off of his album El Abayarde Contraataca.

=== Parodies ===
Parodies of the song include "Dr. Evil", written and performed by They Might Be Giants for the 1999 film Austin Powers: The Spy Who Shagged Me, and "Max Power", from The Simpsons season 10 episode "Homer to the Max". The Simpsons 8th season episode "You Only Move Twice" features a Bond-like villain in Hank Scorpio (Albert Brooks), with an end credits song about him in the style of "Goldfinger". A season 3 episode of the 1994 animated show ReBoot also featured a Bassey-style intro song and credits titled "Firewall".. In 2020 Korean Animated series produced by SAMG Entertainment, Catch! Tennieping (2020) 2nd season Twinkle episode 24 "Teenieping School Graduation" the first seconds of Jevel Tennieping song, a Graduation song, Heartsping on Piano and Joahping sing parody until switch to other style.

=== Inspired songs ===
In 1989, after the release of Gladys Knight's James Bond theme song "Licence to Kill", from the film of the same title, it was felt to significantly reuse important elements of "Goldfinger", and so the songwriting credits for the former were adapted for all subsequent releases.

== Charts ==
Charts	Peak position
Australia (ARIA)	4
Austria (Ö3 Austria Top 40)	7
Belgium (Ultratop 50 Flanders)	9
Belgium (Ultratop 50 Wallonia)	14
Netherlands (Single Top 100)	5
Norway (VG-lista)	7
UK Singles (Official Charts)	21
US Billboard Hot 100	8
US Adult Contemporary (Billboard)	2
West Germany (GfK)	8

== See also ==
- James Bond music
- Outline of James Bond
