= Love, Life and Feelings =

Studio album by Shirley Bassey
- Released: May 1976
- Genre: Vocal / MOR
- Label: United Artists
- Producer: Martin Davis

Shirley Bassey chronology
Good, Bad but Beautiful (1975)	Love, Life and Feelings (1976)	You Take My Heart Away (1977)

Love, Life and Feelings is the 21st studio album from Shirley Bassey, released in 1976 on the United Artists label. The album peaked at #13 in the UK album chart, and charted at #149 in the Billboard 200. Love, Life and Feelings was awarded silver record status by the British Phonographic Industry, with sales of more than 60,000 copies. It features covers of contemporary pop songs from the late 1960s and early 1970s, such as "Alone Again (Naturally)" the 1972 UK #3 single from Gilbert O'Sullivan and "The Way I Want to Touch You" from Captain & Tennille alongside "What I Did for Love", from the musical A Chorus Line written by Marvin Hamlisch.

Singles released from the album include "Natali", an Italian song with lyrics by Norman Newell, which was issued with the non-album track "Runaway" ("E poi..." Andrea Lovecchio, Shel Shapiro) as the B-side; the song was recorded in Italian and English by the Italian singer Mina. This track has of 2011 not been re-issued on CD.

Love, Life and Feelings was issued originally on 33 1/3 rpm vinyl and audio cassette with sleeve cover photography by Richard Avedon. The album was re-issued on a double CD set in 2006, by BGO Records, together with the 1974 album Nobody Does It Like Me.

== Track listing ==
Side One.

1. "What I Did for Love" (Edward Kleban, Marvin Hamlisch) - 3.47
2. "The Hungry Years" (Howard Greenfield, Neil Sedaka) - 4.36
3. "Born to Lose" (Sergio Bardotti, Dario Bembo, Norman Newell) - 5:46
4. "Everything That Touches You" (Michael Kamen) - 3.22
5. "Isn't It a Shame (Randy Edelman) - 3.47
6. "Midnight Blue" (Melissa Manchester, Carole Bayer Sager) - 4.11

Side Two.

1. "The Way I Want to Touch You" (Toni Tennille) - 3.17
2. "Natali" (Balsamo, Norman Newell) - 5.02
3. "You've Made Me So Very Happy" (Berry Gordy, Brenda Holloway, Patrice Holloway, Frank Wilson) - 3.41
4. "Alone Again (Naturally)" (Gilbert O'Sullivan) - 4.54
5. "Feelings" (Morris Albert) - 4.46
6. "If I Never Sing Another Song" (Don Black, Udo Jürgens) - 4.04

== Personnel ==
- Shirley Bassey – vocal
- Martin Davis – producer
- Arthur Greenslade – arranger, conductor
- Martin Rushent – engineer
