= Diamonds Are Forever (soundtrack) =

Soundtrack album by John Barry
- Released: 1971
- Recorded: October 1971
- Label: EMI
- Producer: Frank Collura (reissue)

John Barry chronology
On Her Majesty's Secret Service (1969)	Diamonds Are Forever (1971)	Mary, Queen of Scots (1971)

Singles from Diamonds Are Forever
- 1. "Diamonds Are Forever" Released: 1971

Professional ratings
Review scores
Source	Rating
AllMusic	4.5/5 stars

Diamonds Are Forever is the 1971 soundtrack by John Barry for the seventh James Bond film of the same name. "Diamonds Are Forever", the title song with lyrics by Don Black, was the second Bond theme to be performed by Shirley Bassey, after "Goldfinger" from the 1964 film of the same name.

== 2003 Extended Track listing ==
Tracks 13–21 were not released on the original soundtrack.

1. "Diamonds Are Forever" (Main Title) – sung by Shirley Bassey
2. "Bond Meets Bambi and Thumper (Extended) " (Note: contains the "James Bond Theme", originally composed for the Dr. No soundtrack)
3. "Moon Buggy Ride"
4. "Circus, Circus"
5. "Death at the Whyte House"
6. "Diamonds Are Forever (Source Instrumental)"
7. "Diamonds Are Forever (Bond and Tiffany)"
8. "Bond Smells a Rat"
9. "Tiffany Case"
10. "007 and Counting"
11. "Q's Trick"
12. "To Hell with Blofeld" (Note: contains "007", originally from the From Russia with Love soundtrack)
13. "Gunbarrel and Manhunt"
14. "Mr. Wint and Mr. Kidd / Bond to Holland"
15. "Peter Franks"
16. "Airport Source / On the Road"
17. "Slumber, Inc."
18. "The Whyte House"
19. "Plenty, Then Tiffany"
20. "Following the Diamonds"
21. "Additional and Alternate Cues"

== 2026 La-La Land Records Diamonds Are Forever: 55th Anniversary Remastered & Expanded Limited Edition (2-CD Set) ==
DISC 1 SCORE PRESENTATION 1:08:39

1. Gun Barrel And Manhunt 3:11 (Note: contains the "James Bond Theme", originally composed for the Dr. No soundtrack)
2. Diamonds Are Forever (Film Version) (Performed by Shirley Bassey) 2:52
3. Mr. Wint And Mr. Kidd 2:33
4. Mrs. Whistler And Hovercraft To Holland 2:02
5. Diamonds Are Forever 3:45
6. Tiffany Case 3:47
7. Peter Franks 3:02
8. Los Angeles To Las Vegas 3:02
9. Slumber Inc. 2:22
10. The Whyte House 2:22
11. Plenty, Then Tiffany 2:28
12. Circus Circus (Film Version) 2:49
13. We Lost Her And WW Tectronics 4:06
14. Stealing The Moon Buggy 1:00
15. Moon Buggy Ride (Film Version) 3:19
16. Scaling The Whyte House 1:11
17. Death At The Whyte House 3:45
18. Bond Smells A Rat 1:54
19. Bond Meets Bambi And Thumper (Extended Version) 2:11
20. Breaststroke Lessons 1:06
21. Q's Trick 2:27
22. 007 And Counting 3:32
23. Baja? 2:16
24. Oil Rig Attack 1:37
25. To Hell With Blofeld 1:35
26. Diamonds Are Forever (Extended Version) 2:47
27. The End Of Mr. Wint And Mr. Kidd :55

ALTERNATE VERSIONS 7:31

1. Diamonds Are Forever (Alternate) (Performed by Shirley Bassey) 3:18
2. Moon Buggy Ride (Alternate Segment) 1:59
3. Bond Meets Bambi And Thumper (Alternate) 2:07

TOTAL DISC 1 TIME: 1:16:11

DISC 2 Original 1971 Soundtrack Album 34:39

1. Diamonds Are Forever (Performed by Shirley Bassey) 2:42
2. Bond Meets Bambi And Thumper 2:06
3. Moon Buggy Ride 3:14
4. Circus Circus 2:56
5. Death At The Whyte House 3:45
6. Diamonds Are Forever 3:45
7. Diamonds Are Forever 2:33
8. Bond Smells A Rat 1:54
9. Tiffany Case 3:46
10. 007 And Counting 3:32
11. Q's Trick 2:26
12. To Hell With Blofeld 1:35

ADDITIONAL MUSIC 14:26

1. Slumber Inc. (Wild Organ) 1:48
2. Hotel Tropicana :40
3. The Whyte House (Extended Version) 4:27
4. Circus Circus (With Overlays) 2:57
5. Water Balloons 3:42
6. Zambora :44

BONUS TRACK

1. Vivo di diamanti (Performed by Shirley Bassey) 2:42

TOTAL DISC 2 TIME: 51:57 TOTAL ALBUM TIME: 2:08:08

This is a CD format release

"A" contains the "James Bond Theme", originally composed for the Dr. No soundtrack

== See also ==
- Outline of James Bond
- James Bond music
