= Fun Lovin' Criminals discography =

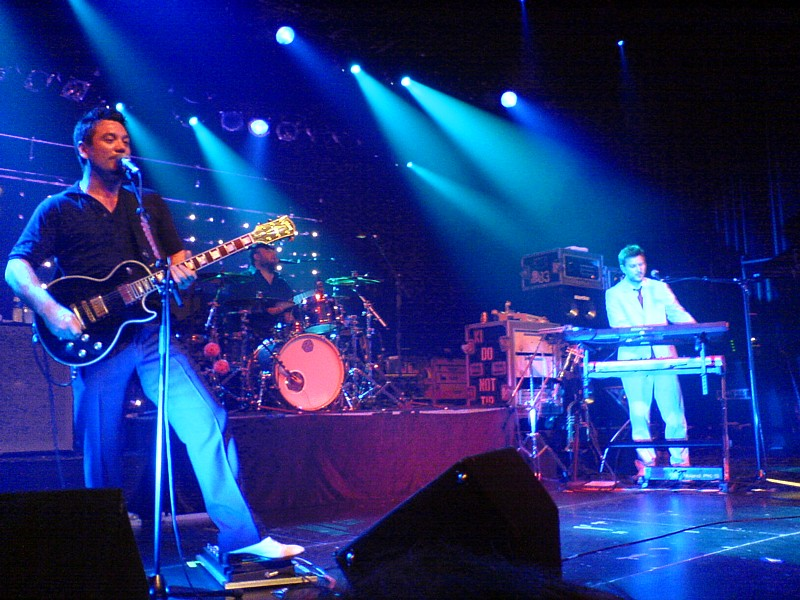
- Fun Lovin' Criminals performing in 2005
- Studio albums: 6
- Extended plays: 1
- Live albums: 1
- Compilation albums: 6
- Singles: 20
- Video albums: 3

The discography of Fun Lovin' Criminals encompasses six studio albums, a live album, seven compilation albums, an EP, sixteen singles and three video albums.

== Studio albums ==
List of albums, with selected chart positions
Title	Album details	Peak chart positions										Sales	Certifications
Title	Album details	US	AUS	AUT	BEL (FL)	FRA	GER	NLD	NZ	SCO	UK	Sales	Certifications
Come Find Yourself	Release date: February 20, 1996; Label: Capitol/Chrysalis/EMI/Silver Spotlight	144	62	—	19	—	66	51	30	5	7		BPI: Platinum
100% Colombian	Release date: November 17, 1998; Label: Capitol/Chrysalis/EMI	— (Note: "100% Colombian" did not enter the Billboard 200, but peaked at number 29 on the Heatseekers Albums at number 29."Fun Lovin' Criminals Chart History". Billboard.)	69	27	5	42	41	11	30	4	3		BPI: Platinum
Loco	Release date: March 6, 2001; Label: EMI	—	—	65	13	80	—	35	24	2	5		BPI: Gold
Welcome to Poppy's	Release date: September 9, 2003; Label: Sanctuary	—	—	—	—	—	—	88	—	15	20		
Livin' in the City	Release date: August 16, 2005; Label: Sanctuary	—	—	—	—	—	—	89	—	93	57		
Classic Fantastic	Release date: March 1, 2010; Label: Kilohertz	—	—	—	53	—	—	60	—	—	112		

== Live albums ==
Title	Album details
Fun, Live and Criminal	Release date: April, 2011; Label: Kilohertz

== Compilation albums ==
List of albums, with selected chart positions
Title	Album details	Peak chart positions				Sales	Certifications
Title	Album details	NZ	SCO	UK	UK Indie	Sales	Certifications
Mimosa	Release date: December 7, 1999; Label: Capitol Records/Chrysalis/EMI	25	37	37	—	UK: 100,000	BPI: Gold
Bag of Hits	Release date: July 9, 2002; Label: Capitol Records/Chrysalis/EMI	20	5	11	—	UK: 100,000	BPI: Gold
Scooby Snacks: The Collection	Release date: July 8, 2003; Label: EMI Gold (Budget album)	—	—	—	—		
A's, B's and Rarities	Release date: February 2, 2004; Label: EMI	—	—	—	—		
The Ultra Selection	Release date: 2 May 2005; Label: Disky	—	—	—	—		
Essential	Release date: March 19, 2012; Label: EMI	—	—	—	—		
Another Mimosa	Release date: January 18, 2019; Label: DiFontaine	—	56	— (Note: "Another Mimosa" did not enter the UK Albums Chart, but peaked at number 77 on the UK Album Sales chart."Official Albums Sales Chart Top 100 25 January 2019 - 31 January 2019". Official Charts.)	16		

== Extended plays ==
Title	Album details
Fun Lovin' Criminals (Original Soundtrack for Hi-Fi Living)	Release date: November 1995; Label: Silver Spotlight Records
Roosevelt Sessions (EP)	Release date: 9 November 2022; Label: Difontaine Records

== Singles ==
Title	Year	Peak chart positions										Certifications	Album
Title	Year	US	US Alt	AUS	BEL	IRE	NLD	NZ	SCO	UK	UK Indie	Certifications	Album
"We Have All the Time in the World"	1995	—	—	—	—	—	—	—	—	—	—		Come Find Yourself
"The Grave and the Constant"	1996	—	—	—	—	—	—	—	85	72	—		Come Find Yourself
"Scooby Snacks"	1996	— (Note: "Scooby Snacks" did not enter the Billboard Hot 100, but peaked at number 73 on the Radio Songs chart.)	14	32	—	92	37	18	24	22	—		Come Find Yourself
"The Fun Lovin' Criminal"	1996	—	—	81	—	—	—	—	27	26	—	BPI: Silver	Come Find Yourself
"King of New York"	1997	—	—	—	—	—	—	—	24	28	—		Come Find Yourself
"I'm Not in Love" / "Scooby Snacks"	1997	—	—	—	—	27	—	—	8	12	—		Mimosa / Come Find Yourself
"Love Unlimited"	1998	—	—	—	— (Note: "Love Unlimited" did not enter the Flanders Ultratop 50, but peaked at number 17 on the Ultratip chart.)	—	80	—	12	18	—		100% Colombian
"Big Night Out"	1998	—	—	—	—	—	—	—	21	29	—		100% Colombian
"Korean Bodega"	1999	—	—	—	—	—	—	—	11	15	—		100% Colombian
"Couldn't Get It Right" (Note: "Couldn't Get it Right" was released as a single in Finland and charted at number 15 on the Finland Singles Chart."Fun Lovin' Criminals - Couldn't Get it Right (song)". Finnish Charts.)	1999	—	—	—	—	—	—	—	—	—	—		Essential
"Loco"	2001	—	—	—	—	22	85	49	5	5	—		Loco
"Bump" / "Run Daddy Run"	2001	—	—	—	—	—	—	—	38	50	—		Loco
"Too Hot"	2003	—	—	—	—	—	—	—	61	61	9		Welcome to Poppy's
"Beautiful"	2003	—	—	—	—	—	—	—	—	132	41		Welcome to Poppy's
"Lost It All"	2003	—	—	—	—	—	—	—	—	—	—		Welcome to Poppy's
"Mi Corazon"	2005	—	—	—	—	—	—	—	—	182	16		Livin' in the City
"Classic Fantastic"	2010	—	—	—	—	—	—	—	—	—	—		Classic Fantastic
"Mister Sun"	2010	—	—	—	—	—	—	—	—	—	—		Classic Fantastic
"We the Three" / "Keep On Yellin"	2010	—	—	—	—	—	—	—	—	—	—		Classic Fantastic
"Daylight" (featuring Rowetta)	2018	—	—	—	— (Note: "Daylight" did not enter the Wallonia Ultratop 50, but entered the Ultratop "Extra Tips"."Fun Lovin' Criminals - Daylight". Ultratop Charts.)	—	—	—	—	—	—		Another Mimosa

== Videos ==
- Love Ya Back - A Video Collection (2001, DVD-V, EMI/Chrysalis)
- The Bong Remains The Same (2003, DVD, Mita Media)
- Come Find Yourself (Live In Berlin) - 20th Anniversary (2007, DVD, DiFontaine)
