= Loco (Fun Lovin' Criminals album) =

Studio album by Fun Lovin' Criminals
- Released: March 6, 2001
- Recorded: May – September 2000
- Studio: The Magic Shop (New York, NY); Hyperbolic Sound (Maui, HI)
- Genre: Alternative hip-hop
- Length: 58:46
- Label: Chrysalis
- Producer: Fun Lovin' Criminals

Fun Lovin' Criminals chronology
Mimosa (1999)	Loco (2001)	Bag of Hits (2002)

Singles from Loco
- 1. "Loco" Released: February 2001; 2. "Bump"/"Run Daddy Run" Released: September 2001

Professional ratings
Review scores
Source	Rating
AllMusic	2.5/5 stars
laut.de	4/5 stars
NME	3.5/5 stars
The Guardian	4/5 stars

Loco is the third studio album by American rap rock band Fun Lovin' Criminals. It was released on March 6, 2001, via Chrysalis Records. Recording sessions took place at The Magic Shop in New York and at Hyperbolic Studios in Maui. Production was handled by the band themselves, with Tim Latham serving as additional producer.

== Track listing ==
No.	Title	Length
1.	"Where the Bums Go"	2:57
2.	"Loco"	3:53
3.	"The Biz"	3:01
4.	"Run Daddy Run"	3:45
5.	"Half a Block"	4:19
6.	"Swashbucklin' in Brooklyn"	3:45
7.	"Bump"	3:42
8.	"Microphone Fiend"	5:32
9.	"My Sin"	3:36
10.	"Underground"	4:46
11.	"She's My Friend"	3:34
12.	"There Was a Time"	4:41
13.	"Dickholder"	2:30
14.	"Little Song"	8:45
Total length:		58:46

Notes

- Track 8 is a cover of "Microphone Fiend" written and performed by Eric B. & Rakim.
- Track 14 contains a hidden track "Kill the Bad Guy".

== Personnel ==
- Fun Lovin' Criminals – songwriters (tracks: 1–7, 9–14), producers, arrangers, mixing, art direction
  - Huey Morgan – vocals (tracks: 1–11, 13, 14), guitar, sound effects (track 1), talkbox (track 9), vocoder (track 12)
  - Brian "Fast" Leiser – bass guitar (tracks: 1, 10, 11, 13, 14), grand piano (tracks: 2, 5, 10–12, 14), electric piano (tracks: 2, 5, 7, 9, 10, 12, 14), Arp string synth (tracks: 2, 5, 6, 9, 14), horns (tracks: 2, 5, 7, 8, 10, 12, 14), triangle (tracks: 2, 5, 10, 12), programming (tracks: 2–9, 12), bass keyboards (tracks: 3, 5), sound effects (tracks: 3, 4, 6–8), pianette (track 6), vocoder (track 7), harpsichord (track 9), Hammond organ (track 10), Prophet-5 (track 11)
  - Maxwell "Mackie" Jayson – drums, percussion (tracks: 2, 5–11, 13, 14), timbales (track 9), sound effects (track 10)
- Descemer Bueno – backing vocals (track 2)
- Xiomara Laugart – backing vocals (track 2)
- Tim Latham – slap bass (track 2), additional producer, recording, mixing
- Danny Madden – additional vocals (track 3)
- MC Large – additional vocals (track 3)
- Simone Hines – additional vocals (track 3), backing vocals (track 6)
- Mateo DiFontaine – sound effects (track 4)
- Peter Levin – electric piano (track 8)
- Simi – strings (track 8)
- Luke Mon – trombone (track 8)
- Juan Garcia – recording assistant
- Reto Peter – recording assistant
- Ben Holt – mixing assistant
- Jay Rae – mixing assistant
- Gerb – art direction
- Matt Weber – photography
- Paulo Netto – photography

== Charts ==
Chart (2001)	Peak position
Austrian Albums (Ö3 Austria)	65
Belgian Albums (Ultratop Flanders)	13
Dutch Albums (Album Top 100)	35
Finnish Albums (Suomen virallinen lista)	39
French Albums (SNEP)	80
German Albums (Offizielle Top 100)	45
New Zealand Albums (RMNZ)	24
Scottish Albums (OCC)	2
Swiss Albums (Schweizer Hitparade)	86
UK Albums (OCC)	5
