= Bag of Hits =

Compilation album by Fun Lovin' Criminals
- Released: July 9, 2002
- Length: 56:24
- Label: EMI

Fun Lovin' Criminals chronology
| Mimosa (1999) | Bag of Hits (2002) | Scooby Snacks: The Collection (2003) |

Professional ratings
Review scores
| Source | Rating |
|---|---|
| AllMusic | 4/5 stars |

Bag of Hits is the second compilation album by American rock band Fun Lovin' Criminals. It was released on July 9, 2002 via EMI. Early versions included a limited edition bonus disc with rare and previously unreleased remixes.

The album's photo was taken in Williamsburg, Brooklyn, New York. The photo session included multiple body shots, and lasted around three hours. The art director met the model at an art show for Andrés García-Peña.

The album peaked at number 11 on the UK Albums Chart and number 20 on the Official Aotearoa Music Charts.

== Track listing ==
CD One
| No. | Title | Length |
|---|---|---|
| 1. | "The Fun Lovin' Criminal" | 3:12 |
| 2. | "Up on the Hill" | 4:26 |
| 3. | "Loco" | 3:54 |
| 4. | "Korean Bodega" | 2:48 |
| 5. | "King of New York" | 3:46 |
| 6. | "Run Daddy Run" | 3:46 |
| 7. | "The Grave & The Constant" | 4:46 |
| 8. | "Swashbucklin' in Brooklyn" | 3:47 |
| 9. | "Love Unlimited" | 3:25 |
| 10. | "Bump" | 3:43 |
| 11. | "Scooby Snacks" | 3:03 |
| 12. | "Smoke 'Em" | 4:45 |
| 13. | "Couldn't Get It Right" | 3:46 |
| 14. | "Big Night Out" | 3:38 |
| 15. | "We Have All the Time in the World" | 3:39 |
| Total length: | | 56:24 |

CD Two
| No. | Title | Length |
|---|---|---|
| 16. | "The Fun Lovin' Criminal (DJ BombJack Remix)" |
| 17. | "King of New York (Cooley High Remix)" |
| 18. | "Run Daddy Run (MC Large Mix)" |
| 19. | "Up on the Hill (Cobble Hill Remix)" |
| 20. | "Loco (Latin Quarter Version)" |
| 21. | "Bump (Mark Berkley's Bump Remix)" |
| 22. | "The Grave and the Constant (Stephen Lironi 12" Remix)" |
| 23. | "King of New York (Jack Dangers Mix Complex #1)" |
| 24. | "Up on the Hill (Tar Beach Remix)" |
| 25. | "Korean Bodega (Aero Mexicana Mix)" |
| 26. | "Love Unlimited (Remix)" |
| 27. | "Scooby Snacks (Rockamental Version)" |

== Charts ==
| Chart (2002) | Peak position |
|---|---|
| New Zealand Albums (RMNZ) | 20 |
| Scottish Albums (Official Charts) | 5 |
| UK Albums (Official Charts) | 11 |
