= A's, B's and Rarities =

Compilation album by Fun Lovin' Criminals
- Released: March 2, 2004
- Genre: Jazz rap Hip-hop; Alternative rock Blues; Funk
- Length: 2:43:25
- Label: EMI

Fun Lovin' Criminals chronology
Welcome to Poppy's (2003)	A's, B's and Rarities (2004)	Livin' in the City (2005)

Professional ratings
Review scores
Source	Rating
AllMusic	4/5 stars

A's, B's and Rarities is an album by the band Fun Lovin' Criminals. It was released by their former label EMI Chrysalis, and collects a large number of rarities from their time with the label, although not all of them (it is notably missing the B-Side "Special Dedication" from Loco CD1).

"Blues For Suckers", "Sleepyhead", "The Ballad Of Larry Davis" were non-album B-Sides, although "Blues For Suckers" is a schmoove version of "Bear Hug" from the band's album Come Find Yourself. In addition "The Beach", "Searching For Clues" and "Battle On The Golf Course" are previously unreleased full length versions of songs recorded for the band's Maui Homicide 2000 soundtrack. Excerpts from each, as well as some otherwise unreleased tracks, were included on "Maui Homicide 2000 [Medley]", one of the B-Sides of the Run Daddy Run/Bump single. The full soundtrack has not been released, but also includes "Special Dedication" (from the B-Side to "Loco") and "Kill The Bad Guy" (hidden track on the album "Loco").

== Track listing ==
=== Disc 1 - A-Sides ===
1. "The Fun Lovin' Criminal" – 3:13
2. "The Grave and the Constant" – 4:47
3. "King of New York" – 3:48
4. "Korean Bodega" – 2:49
5. "Loco" – 3:56
6. "Bump" (Radio Mix) – 3:26
7. "Run Daddy Run" – 3:45
8. "Big Night Out" (Radio Version) – 3:38
9. "I'm Not in Love" – 4:39
10. "Love Unlimited" – 3:27
11. "Scooby Snacks" – 3:03

=== Disc 2 - B-Sides ===
1. "Sleepyhead" – 4:18
2. "The Grave and the Constant" (12 Steve Leroni Mix) – 5:02
3. "I Can't Get With That" (Live At The Forum) – 4:53
4. "Come Find Yourself" (BBC Live Session) – 3:59
5. "Blues for Suckers" – 3:49
6. "The Fun Lovin' Criminal" (Hee Haw Version) – 5:02
7. "Run Daddy Run" (MC Large Mix) – 3:56
8. "Loco" (Latin Quarter Version) – 4:00
9. "Bump" (Mark Berkley's Remix) – 6:55
10. "King of New York" (Jack Dangers Complex 1) – 5:40
11. "Everything Under the Stars" – 4:04
12. "Scooby Snacks" (20MG Version) – 3:40
13. "Smoke 'Em" (BBC Live Session) – 4:48
14. "Love Unlimited" (Remix) – 3:50
15. "The Ballad of Larry Davis" – 3:49
16. "Korean Bodega" (Aero Mexicano Mix) – 2:56

=== Disc 3 - Rarities ===
1. "The Fun Lovin' Criminal" (Hot 1997 Rockumental Mix) – 3:14
2. "The Beach" – 4:49
3. "Scooby Snacks" (Steve Leroni Instrumental With Movie Samples) – 3:05
4. "Searching for Clues" – 3:06
5. "Up on the Hill" (Tar Beach Remix) – 4:50
6. "Bump" (Mark Berkleys Instrumental Remix) – 6:55
7. "The Fun Lovin' Criminal" (DJ Bombjack Remix) – 3:37
8. "The Streets Are Watching" (Instrumental) – 3:49
9. "Battle On The Golf Course" – 3:54
10. "Scooby Snacks (20MG Dub)" – 3:32
11. "King of New York (Cooley High Remix)" – 3:32
12. "Loco (Album Instrumental)" – 3:54
13. "We Have All the Time in the World (Schmoove Version)" – 3:56

== Charts ==
Chart performance for A's, B's and Rarities
Chart (2025)	Peak position
UK Independent Albums (OCC)	49
