= Scooby Snacks: The Collection =

Compilation album by Fun Lovin' Criminals
- Released: July 8, 2003
- Length: 50:23
- Label: EMI

Fun Lovin' Criminals chronology
Bag of Hits (2002)	Scooby Snacks: The Collection (2003)	Welcome to Poppy's (2003)

Professional ratings
Review scores
Source	Rating
Allmusic	3/5 stars

Scooby Snacks: The Collection is a budget compilation album by the band Fun Lovin' Criminals. The compilation is notable for containing a previously rare track "Blues For Suckers" (a Schmoove version of "Bear Hug") which was available on their 1995 debut EP Original Soundtrack For Hi-Fi Living and was the only song from the EP that was not re-issued on the group's 1996 debut album Come Find Yourself.

== Track listing ==
1. "Scooby Snacks (Schmoove Version)" – 3:23
2. "The Fun Lovin' Criminal" – 3:13
3. "Korean Bodega" – 2:48
4. "Bombin' the L" – 3:51
5. "I'm Not in Love" – 4:40
6. "10th Street" – 2:24
7. "Bear Hug" – 3:29
8. "Half a Block" – 4:22
9. "Blues for Suckers" – 3:50
10. "We Have All the Time in the World (Copa Cabana Version)" – 2:47
11. "I Can't Get With That" – 4:23
12. "Up on the Hill" – 4:29
13. "Bump" – 3:45
14. "Where the Bums Go" – 2:59

== CD Track listing Barcode 7 24359 02062 4 ==
1. "The Fun Lovin' Criminal" – 3:11
2. "Bombin' the L" – 3:49
3. "Bear Hug" – 3:27
4. "Blues for Suckers" – 3:48
5. "I Can't Get With That" – 4:23
6. "10th Street" – 2:22
7. "Korean Bodega" – 2:47
8. "Up on the Hill" – 4:26
9. "I'm Not in Love" – 4:36
10. "We Have All the Time in the World (Copa Cabana Version)" – 2:44
11. "Scooby Snacks (Schmoove Version)" – 3:21
12. "Bump" – 3:42
13. "Half a Block" – 4:19
14. "Where the Bums Go" – 2:57
