= Fun, Live and Criminal =

2011 compilation album by Fun Lovin' Criminals

Compilation album by Fun Lovin' Criminals
- Released: April 2011
- Genres: Rock, hip-hop, soul, funk
- Label: Kilohertz

Fun Lovin' Criminals chronology
Classic Fantastic (2010)	Fun, Live and Criminal (2011)	Essential (2012)

Fun, Live and Criminal is an album by the band Fun Lovin' Criminals released in 2011. It is released by their former label Kilohertz.

== Track listing ==
=== Disc one ===
1. Jimi Choo – 3:04
2. Classic Fantastic – 3:37
3. Big Night Out – 4:21
4. Korean Bodega – 2:55
5. Loco – 4:06
6. The Grave And The Constant – 4:47
7. Swashbucklin' In Brooklyn – 4:08
8. Back On The Block – 3:53
9. Bump – 3:36
10. Mister Sun – 4:38
11. King Of New York – 4:07
12. Mars – 3:44
13. Scooby Snacks – 3:15
14. Blues For Suckers – 3:32
15. Coney Island Girl – 1:41
16. We, The Three – 3:07
17. Love Unlimited – 4:28
18. Live Have Love – 3:24
19. We Have All The Time In The World – 4:05
20. The Fun Lovin' Criminal – 4:02

=== Disc two ===
1. I Love Livin' In The City – 4:10
2. Bombin' The L – 2:41
3. Too Hot – 3:14
4. Up On The Hill – Saxophone, Gaz Birtles – 4:10
5. City Boy – 3:22
6. Passive/Aggressive – 3:27
7. Mi Corazon – Saxophone, Gaz Birtles – 3:44
8. Southside – 4:45
9. Come Find Yourself – 5:02
10. I Can't Get With That – 4:33
11. Where The Bums Go – 2:09
12. 10th Street – 2:19
13. Smoke 'Em – 5:45
14. Got Our Love – 3:26
15. The Ballad Of NYC – 6:33
16. Methadonia – 3:44
17. Bear Hug – 2:34
18. Will I Be Ready – 8:15

=== Disc three ===
1. Take Me Back – 3:45
2. How It Be – Saxophone, Gaz Birtles – 4:15
3. You Got A Problem – 3:00
4. That Ain't Right – 3:11
5. Run Daddy Run – 3:06
6. Is Ya Alright – 3:07
7. The Preacher – 3:08
8. Dickholder – 2:27
9. Gave Up On God – 5:16
10. Friday Night – 5:13
11. She Sings At The Sun – 4:02
12. Keep On Yellin' – Featuring Roots Manuva – 4:20
13. Conversations With Our Attorney – 2:40
14. The Girl With The Scar – Saxophone, Gaz Birtles – 4:36
15. U No I Bin Livin' – 2:49
16. Mothertrucker – 2:37
17. Jive – 3:31
