= Liza Tarbuck =

British television presenter and actress

- Born: 21 November 1964 (age 61); Liverpool, England
- Education: Royal Academy of Dramatic Art (BA)
- Occupations: Actress; radio and television presenter
- Years active: 1986–present
- Parent: Jimmy Tarbuck

Liza Tarbuck (/ˈliːzə/ LEE-zə; born 21 November 1964) is an English actress, comedian, and television and radio presenter.

== Early life ==
Liza Tarbuck was born in Liverpool and grew up near Kingston upon Thames. She is the daughter of comedian Jimmy Tarbuck and his wife Pauline, with an older sister, Cheryl, and a younger brother, James. She attended an independent convent school. She trained at the National Youth Theatre and RADA graduating in 1986 alongside Clive Owen, Rebecca Pidgeon, and Mark Womack.

== Acting ==
Tarbuck's first big break came in 1987 when she landed a starring role in the Granada Television comedy series Watching, opposite Emma Wray. She stayed with Watching for its entire seven-year run. She also appeared as Angie in the 1988 Falklands War drama Tumbledown, which starred Colin Firth, Paul Rhys and David Calder.

In 1989, Tarbuck played Dana in the first of the six Victoria Wood penned anthology comedy plays Mens Sana in Thingummy Doodah, presented on BBC1 in the series Victoria Wood.

In 2001, she took the title role in Linda Green, which ran for two series, ending in 2002.

She guest starred on the Ricky Gervais comedy Extras and appeared in The Inspector Lynley Mysteries as DI Fiona Knight.

In 2004, she appeared in Series 6 of the BBC One comedy French & Saunders, as a fictionalised version of herself, where she had the role of producer for Saunders & French Productions with Christopher Hague-Moody.

In 2005, she appeared as Mrs Jellyby in the BBC One serial Bleak House, and in 2006 she appeared in episode six of the sitcom Saxondale, as a full-figured rock chick.

In 2007, she provided a voiceover for the animated Doctor Who adventure The Infinite Quest. 2007 also saw her starring in the ITV1 comedy drama Bonkers.

In 2009 she starred as Tina in her first role in a feature film, in The Be All and End All, and since 2016 she has played the part of Anne Hathaway in the BBC Two comedy series Upstart Crow.

In 2019, she starred in How Europe Stole My Mum. This Channel 4 comedy documentary, presented by comedian Kieran Hodgson and also starring Harry Enfield, examines how Brexit came about and how the divided country might be put back together.

== Presenting ==
She presented the Channel 4 fashion programme She's Gotta Have It in 1998 and The Big Breakfast with Johnny Vaughan, Sara Cox and Richard Bacon during 1999 and 2000. In 2001, she teamed up with her father for a celebrity edition of Who Wants to Be a Millionaire? In the early 2000s, she hosted the Sky One game show Blockbusters and has been a guest presenter on Have I Got News for You. In 2003, she hosted Channel 4's Emmy Award winning panel-discussion/gameshow Without Prejudice?.

She hosted a late-night edition of Win, Lose or Draw, and has presented Britain's Top Dog, as well as narrating the last series of the documentary Airport in 2005.

She presented a one-off quiz for Five called I Blame the Spice Girls to celebrate Five's tenth birthday. She has also appeared in advertisements for the supermarket Asda.

She signed a deal with Sky One to present a show called Pet Nation alongside Huey Morgan in 2010.

She narrated the Channel 4 dieting show Supersize vs Superskinny between 2008 and 2014.

In 2015, Tarbuck narrated the Animal Planet series Meet The Orangutans.

== Radio ==
=== BBC Radio 4 ===
Tarbuck played Helen Golightly in the BBC Radio 4 programme Clare in the Community from series 5 to series 9, taking over from Gemma Craven. She has also appeared in other shows for BBC Radio 4, such as Just a Minute and a story about Jayne Mansfield. In December 2016 she presented Remembering Ronnie Corbett, a tribute to the late comedy star. In October 2017 she appeared on Front Row with Harry Hill. In December 2017 she was a guest on Radio 4's Saturday Live. In January 2018 she was a guest on Great Lives, talking about the Serbian-American scientist Nikola Tesla.

=== BBC Radio 2 ===
During September 2007 Tarbuck co-presented the weekday afternoon show on BBC Radio 2 with Mark Radcliffe, whilst Steve Wright was on leave. In December 2007 (and again in January and March 2008), she once more hosted the show, this time as a solo presenter. In July 2008 she once again co-presented with Radcliffe.

In December 2008 and January 2009, she presented the Saturday morning slot on BBC Radio 2 with Martin Freeman whilst Jonathan Ross was away from the station, and again in August 2009 alongside Huey Morgan of Fun Lovin' Criminals. The pair presented the show again in November 2009.

For a week in March 2009, she stood in for Sarah Kennedy's popular Dawn Patrol show.

Tarbuck stood in for Simon Mayo on his BBC Radio 2 Drivetime Show for three weeks in July/August 2010 also covering the show on 18–22 April in 2011, 1–19 August in 2011, 4–8 June 2012, 14–18 February 2013, 15 July 2013, 26–30 May 2014, 6–10 April 2015 and 14 June 2016. On 9 October 2018, she presented the Drivetime show (5pm–8pm) with Simon Mayo while Jo Whiley was away from the station.

On 25 December 2009, she presented a four-hour show on BBC Radio 2 called Liza Tarbuck's Christmas, from midnight until 4am.

In 2013, she presented a BBC Radio 2 special celebrating the career of the British comedian Ken Dodd called How Tickled I've Been.

In 2015, she visited Mary Berry at her home for a BBC Radio 2 Christmas Eve special.

On Sunday 8 October 2017, she stood in for Michael Ball on his 11 am – 1 pm show.

On Wednesday 25 December 2019, she presented a Christmas day special called 'Family Rhythms', 6 pm – 8 pm. Guests included film director Richard Curtis, Strictly Come Dancing star AJ Pritchard, his Love Island star brother Curtis Pritchard, and Spandau Ballet brothers Martin Kemp and Gary Kemp. Tarbuck presented another Christmas Day special in 2020.

On 12 May 2012, she began presenting her own radio show on BBC Radio 2, between 6pm and 8pm, on Saturdays, replacing Going out with Alan Carr presented by Carr and Melanie Sykes. On 11 March 2026, Tarbuck announced that she had left Radio 2. Her final show was broadcast on 17 January.

=== UK Radio Aid ===
UK Radio Aid was a charitable event in the United Kingdom held on Monday 17 January 2005 to raise money for the DEC appeal for the victims of the Asian tsunami. The event consisted of a twelve-hour radio show broadcast on 268 radio stations with an audience of over 20 million. Tarbuck presented the 16:00–18:00 slot with her former Big Breakfast co-host Johnny Vaughan.

== Writing ==
I An Distracted By Everything [sic], written by Tarbuck, was published in November 2017. Tarbuck described the one-off publication as "an annual for grown-ups".

== Film and television appearances ==
Year	Title	Role	Notes
1987–1993	Watching	Pamela Wilson/Lynch	53 episodes
1988	Tumbledown	Angie	TV drama film
1989	Victoria Wood	Dana	1 episode - "Mens Sana in Thingummydoodah"
1991	Chimera	Girl on coach	TV mini-series
1998	Blankety Blank	Herself	1 episode
1999–2000	The Big Breakfast	Presenter	
2000	The League of Gentlemen	Donna	1 episode - Christmas special
2000–2001	Blockbusters	Presenter	
2000–2001	Time Team	Herself	2 episodes
2000–2006	Have I Got News for You	Herself	3 episodes
2001	Room 101	Herself	1 episode
2001	Parkinson	Herself	1 episode
2001–2002	Linda Green	Linda Green	20 episodes
2002	V Graham Norton	Herself	1 episode
2002	Tractor Tom	Farmer Fi (voice)	26 episodes
2002	The Hound of the Baskervilles	Mrs Barrymore	
2003–2004	Without Prejudice?	Presenter	5 episodes
2004	Friday Night with Jonathan Ross	Herself	1 episode
2004	Win, Lose or Draw Late	Presenter	20 episodes
2004	French and Saunders	Herself	5 episodes
2004	The Big Fat Quiz of the Year	Herself	1 episode
2005	Airport	Narrator	5 episodes
2005, 2007, 2011	8 Out of 10 Cats	Herself	3 episodes
2006	The Inspector Lynley Mysteries	DI Fiona Knight	1 episode - "Natural Causes"
2006	Saxondale	Janet	1 episode
2006	Britain's Top Dog with Liza Tarbuck	Host	7 episodes
2006–2007	Extras	Rita	4 episodes
2006, 2009, 2010, 2012, 2014, 2018 & 2020	QI	Herself	6 episodes (Series D, G, J, K, O & R)
2007	Bonkers	Helen Barker	6 episodes
2007	The Paul O'Grady Show	Herself	1 episode
2009	Queens of British Pop	Narrator	2 episodes
2009	The Be All and End All	Tina	
2010	Liza & Huey's Pet Nation	Co-presenter	
2011	The Boat That Guy Built	Narrator	
2011	Mount Pleasant	Kate	8 episodes
2011	The Best Exotic Marigold Hotel	Head Nurse Karen	Comedy-drama film
2012	Skins	Anita Hardbeck	1 episode
2012	World's Most Dangerous Roads: Ho Chi Minh Trail	Herself	1 episode with Sue Perkins (Series 2, Episode 2)
2012	Never Mind the Buzzcocks	Guest presenter	1 episode (Series 26, Episode 11–10 December 2012)
2014	Psychobitches	Miss Muffet & Witch	
2015	8 Out of 10 Cats Does Countdown	Herself	1 episode
2015	Miranda	Registrar	1 episode (New Year's Special)
2015	Mel and Sue	Herself	
2015	Let's Play Darts	Contestant	1 episode
2015–present	Eat Well For Less?	Narrator	
2016	Silent Witness	DI Pamela Rankin	
2016	Alan Davies: As Yet Untitled	Herself	1 episode (Series 4 Episode 4)
2016	Tipping Point: Lucky Stars	Contestant	1 episode
2016–2018	Upstart Crow	Anne Shakespeare	20 episodes
2017	The One Show	Herself	1 episode (October 2017)
2018, 2022	Taskmaster	Contestant	Series 6 - May 2018, Champion of Champions II
2018–2019	Celebrity Game Night	Presenter	6 episodes
2019	How Europe Stole My Mum	Mum	1 episode (31 October 2019)
2019	Joe Lycett's Got Your Back	Herself	1 episode - "Liza Tarbuck, Housing & Letting Agents"
2019	Hypothetical	Herself	
2020	Comedy Game Night	Herself	Presenter
2023	Wonders of the World I Can't See	Herself	Episode 4
2023	The Change	Siobhain	TV series
2024–2025	Pointless	Co-presenter	13 episodes
2026	The Great Celebrity Pottery Throwdown	Presenter	
