= 100% Colombian =

Studio album by Fun Lovin' Criminals
- Released: November 17, 1998
- Recorded: January–March 1998
- Genres: Hip-hop; alternative rock; blues; jazz rap; mafioso rap; rap rock; funk
- Length: 52:01
- Labels: Virgin, Chrysalis

Fun Lovin' Criminals chronology
Come Find Yourself (1996)	100% Colombian (1998)	Mimosa (1999)

Singles from 100% Colombian
- 1. "Love Unlimited" Released: August 1998; 2. "Big Night Out" Released: October 1998; 3. "Korean Bodega" Released: May 1999

Professional ratings
Review scores
Source	Rating
AllMusic	4/5 stars
The Guardian	2/5 stars
The Independent	4/5 stars
Los Angeles Times	2.5/4 stars
NME	8/10
Select	4/5

100% Colombian is the second studio album released by the band Fun Lovin' Criminals. It was released on November 17, 1998.

== Track listing ==
No.	Title	Length
1.	"Up on the Hill"	4:27
2.	"Love Unlimited"	3:25
3.	"The View Belongs to Everyone"	4:17
4.	"Korean Bodega"	2:47
5.	"Back on the Block"	4:04
6.	"10th Street"	2:23
7.	"Sugar"	3:42
8.	"Southside"	4:36
9.	"We Are All Very Worried About You"	4:07
10.	"All for Self"	4:15
11.	"All My Time Is Gone"	4:00
12.	"Big Night Out"	3:37
13.	"Mini Bar Blues" (Featuring B. B. King)	3:33
14.	"Fisty Nuts" (Contains a short hidden track "Atlantic Cab")	2:42
15.	"Shining Star" (Japan Bonus Track)	4:44

On MD release (Chrysalis 7243 4 97056 8 5) track 14 exists as hidden track ("Atlantic Cab" – "hidden-in-hidden" track), but mentioned into booklet (not on cover or MD case).

== Personnel ==
- Huey Morgan – vocals (all but 14), guitar (all but 13), slide guitar (14)
- Brian Leiser – keyboard (1–3, 5, 9, 11, 13, 15), bass (4, 6, 8, 10, 12–14), trumpet (2, 5, 7, 9–11)
- Steve Borgovini – drums (all)
- Stuart Matthewman – saxophone (1)
- B. B. King – guitar (13)

== Charts ==
=== Weekly charts ===
Chart (1998–1999)	Peak position
Australian Albums (ARIA)	69
Austrian Albums (Ö3 Austria)	27
Belgian Albums (Ultratop Flanders)	5
Canada Top Albums/CDs (RPM)	77
Dutch Albums (Album Top 100)	11
Finnish Albums (Suomen virallinen lista)	38
French Albums (SNEP)	42
German Albums (Offizielle Top 100)	41
New Zealand Albums (RMNZ)	30
Norwegian Albums (VG-lista)	27
Scottish Albums (Official Charts)	4
Swedish Albums (Sverigetopplistan)	25
Swiss Albums (Schweizer Hitparade)	40
UK Albums (Official Charts)	3

=== Year-end charts ===
Chart (1998)	Position
UK Albums (OCC)	71
