= Mimosa (album) =

Compilation album by Fun Lovin' Criminals
- Released: December 7, 1999
- Recorded: April 1995–September 1999
- Studio: Walter Becker's Hyperbolic Sound (Maui, HI); Sorcerer Sound (New York, NY); Sear Sound (New York, NY); Steve Rosenthal's Magic Shop (New York, NY); Baby Monster Studios (New York, NY); Vinny's Music Service (New York, NY)
- Genre: Lounge
- Length: 41:33
- Label: Chrysalis; EMI
- Producer: Fun Lovin' Criminals

Fun Lovin' Criminals chronology
| Mimosa (1999) | Bag of Hits (2002) |

Professional ratings
Review scores
| Source | Rating |
|---|---|
| AllMusic | 4/5 stars |
| NME | 2.5/5 stars |

Mimosa is the first compilation album by American rap rock band Fun Lovin' Criminals. It was released on December 7, 1999 through Chrysalis Records/EMI. Composed of rarities, B-sides, remixes, and covers, it features some notable lounge music versions of the band's old songs, with the exception of "Bombin the L" which, as the title suggests, is performed in a fast swing music style.

Recording sessions took place between April 1995 and September 1999 at Walter Becker's Hyperbolic Sound in Maui, at Sorcerer Sound, Sear Sound, Steve Rosenthal's Magic Shop and Baby Monster Studios in New York City, with additional recording at Vinny's Music Service also in NYC. Production was handled by the band themselves with additional producer Tim Latham. It features a lone guest appearance from Ian McCulloch.

The song "I'm Not in Love", previously appeared in the 1997 compilation Lounge-A-Palooza, was a successful double A-side single with "Scooby Snacks".

The album peaked at number 25 in New Zealand and number 37 on the UK Albums Chart. Its sequel, Another Mimosa, was released in 2019.

== Track listing ==
| No. | Title | Writer(s) | Length |
|---|---|---|---|
| 1. | "Couldn't Get It Right" | Climax Blues Band | 3:46 |
| 2. | "Scooby Snacks" (Schmoove Version) | Fun Lovin' Criminals | 3:21 |
| 3. | "Shining Star" | Leo Graham; Paul Richmond | 4:43 |
| 4. | "Bombin' the L" (Circa 1956 Version) | Fun Lovin' Criminals | 2:27 |
| 5. | "I'm Not in Love" | Eric Stewart; Graham Gouldman | 4:36 |
| 6. | "Summer Wind" (featuring Ian McCulloch) | Heinz Meier; Hans Bradtke; Johnny Mercer | 2:43 |
| 7. | "Crazy Train" | John Michael Osbourne; Randy Rhoads; Robert John Daisley | 3:29 |
| 8. | "I Can't Get With That" (Schmoove Version) | Fun Lovin' Criminals | 5:33 |
| 9. | "We Have All the Time in the World" (Copa Cabana Version) | Hal David; John Barry | 2:44 |
| 10. | "Coney Island Girl" (Schmoove Version) | Fun Lovin' Criminals | 3:07 |
| 11. | "I'll Be Seeing You" | Irving Kahal; Sammy Fain | 5:51 |
| Total length: | | | 41:33 |

Notes

- Track 11 "I'll Be Seeing You" is followed by a 17 second gap and then "Up on the Hill (Schmoove Instrumental)" as a hidden track.

== Charts ==
| Chart (1999) | Peak position |
|---|---|
| New Zealand Albums (RMNZ) | 25 |
| Scottish Albums (OCC) | 37 |
| UK Albums (OCC) | 37 |
