= O polemos ton astron =

- Genre: Comedy
- Created by: Kostas Kazakas
- Directed by: Spyros Rasidakis; Christos Dimas
- Narrated by: Giorgos Panopoulos
- Country of origin: Greece
- Original language: Greek
- No. of seasons: 2
- No. of episodes: 20

Production
- Production locations: Athens, Greece
- Camera setup: Multi-camera
- Running time: 42-45 minutes
- Production company: Noir Productions

Original release
- Network: ANT1
- Release: February 19, 2010 – February 25, 2011

O polemos ton astron (English: Star Wars) is a Greek comedy television series of standalone episodes that aired on ANT1 during the 2009–2011 seasons. The series' narrator and presenter is astrologer Giorgos Panopoulos, who presents the development of each story.

== Plot ==
How will you conquer an Aries? How much future does your relationship with a Virgo have? What will happen if a Scorpio sets his sights on you? The zodiac signs come to life and star in the unique... astrological comedy of Greek television. They flirt with each other, have sex, fall in love, get irritated, get misunderstood, fight, cheat, take revenge.

At the same time, astrologer Giorgos Panopoulos comments, explains and predicts developments with validity and humor. We also learn what the stars say about our relationship, and what can happen to us in the good times if we get involved with the wrong zodiac sign.

== Cast ==
- "Parthenos Mia" / Elisavet Konstantinidou (Virgo) – Petros Mpousoulopoulos (Gemini)
- "Ego kai Aytos" / Smaragda Karydi (Capricorn) – Giannis Stankoglou (Cancer)
- "Pos na rixeis enan toxoti se deka meres" / Orestis Tziovas (Sagittarius) – Eleni Apostolopoulou (Pisces) – Tzeni Mpotsi (Scorpio)
- "A For Vendetta" / Zeta Makrypoulia (Gemini) – Thodoris Atheridis (Scorpio)
- "Tavromachies" / Gerasimos Skiadaresis (Taurus) – Maria Lekaki (Taurus)
- "Shesofobia" / Faidra Drouka (Aquarius) – Antonis Karystinos (Leo)
- "To trito prosopo" / Maria Kavogianni (Cancer) – Alexandros Antonopoulos (Libra)
- "Keravnovolos erotas" / Ioanna Pilichou (Libra) – Apostolis Totsikas (Aries)
- "Nerokouvalites toy oneirou" / Katerina Papoutsaki (Sagittarius) – Petros Lagoutis (Aquarius)
- "To allo miso tou allou misou mou" / Orestis Tziovas (Capricorn) – Katerina Tsavalou (Taurus) – Stavros Svigos (Pisces) – Patricia Peristeri (Leo)
