= Uncle Frank =

Uncle Frank may refer to:

- Frank Potenza (1933–2011), playing a security guard and the host's uncle on Jimmy Kimmel Live!
- Uncle Frank, an alternative stage name of Frank Benbini, the drummer and one third of the Fun Lovin' Criminals
- Uncle Frank, Kevin McCallister's uncle from the film Home Alone
- Uncle Frank, a term of endearment often used in reference to the musician Frank Zappa
- Uncle Frank, a 2002 HBO documentary by Trigger Street Productions, directed by Matthew Ginsburg, about his 85-year-old great uncle, Frank Pour, a musician
- Uncle Frank (film), a 2020 film directed by Alan Ball
