= Welcome to Poppy's =

Studio album by Fun Lovin' Criminals
- Released: September 9, 2003
- Studio: Magic Shop, New York City
- Length: 58:13
- Label: Sanctuary
- Producer: Fun Lovin' Criminals

Fun Lovin' Criminals chronology
| Scooby Snacks: The Collection (2003) | Welcome to Poppy's (2003) | A's, B's and Rarities (2004) |

Singles from Welcome to Poppy's
- 1. "Too Hot" Released: September 2003; 2. "Beautiful" Released: February 2004

Professional ratings
Review scores
| Source | Rating |
|---|---|
| AllMusic | 3/5 stars |
| Now | 2/5 Ns |
| Tiny Mix Tapes | 1/5 marks |

Welcome to Poppy's is the fourth studio album by American rap rock band Fun Lovin' Criminals. It was released on September 9, 2003 through Sanctuary Records. Recording sessions took place at The Magic Shop in New York. Production was handled by the band themselves.

The album debuted at number 20 on the UK Albums Chart, number 15 on the Scottish Albums Chart and number 4 on the UK Independent Albums Chart. It also made it to number 88 on the Dutch Album Top 100.

Its lead single, "Too Hot", peaked at number 61 on the UK Singles Chart and number 9 on the UK Independent Singles Chart. The second single off of the album, "Beautiful", reached number 41 on the UK Independent Singles Chart. The song "Lost It All" was released as a promotional single between the two.

== Track listing ==
| No. | Title | Length |
|---|---|---|
| 1. | "Too Hot" | 3:16 |
| 2. | "Stray Bullet" | 2:47 |
| 3. | "Living on the Streets" | 3:45 |
| 4. | "Lost It All" | 3:01 |
| 5. | "Friday Night" | 4:18 |
| 6. | "You Got a Problem" | 2:56 |
| 7. | "Running for Cover" | 4:21 |
| 8. | "Take Me Back" | 3:32 |
| 9. | "What Had Happened?" | 4:27 |
| 10. | "Got Our Love" | 4:02 |
| 11. | "This Sick World" | 4:10 |
| 12. | "Steak Knife" | 3:31 |
| 13. | "Beautiful" | 4:28 |
| 14. | "Baby" | 3:20 |
| 15. | "You Just Can't Have It All" | 2:44 |
| 16. | Untitled | 3:35 |
| Total length: | | 58:13 |

== Personnel ==
- Fun Lovin' Criminals — songwriters, arrangers, producers
- Jay Jay — backing vocals (track 13)
- Mark Francis "Frank Benbini" Reid — backing vocals (track 15)
- Timo Ellis — drums
- Mackie Jayson — drums (tracks: 3, 10, 12, 13, 14)
- Dante Ross — arranger (track 4)
- Tim Latham — recording, mixing
- Juan Garcia — recording assistant
- Sean Taylor — mixing assistant
- George Marino — mastering
- UE Nastasi — mastering (track 15)
- Gabriel Hunter — art direction, artwork, photography
- Jonathan Block — management

== Charts ==
| Chart (2003) | Peak position |
|---|---|
| Dutch Albums (Album Top 100) | 88 |
| Scottish Albums (OCC) | 15 |
| UK Albums (OCC) | 20 |
| UK Independent Albums (OCC) | 4 |
