= Hollywood Game Night =

American television game show

- Genre: Game show; Panel show
- Created by: Sean Hayes; Todd Milliner
- Presented by: Jane Lynch
- Starring: Dean Butterworth (Bandleader)
- Country of origin: United States
- Original language: English
- No. of seasons: 6
- No. of episodes: 74

Production
- Executive producers: Sean Hayes; Todd Milliner; Michael Agbabian; Dwight D. Smith
- Production locations: Universal Studios; Universal City, California
- Editors: Simon Laight; Mike Souza; Nathan Miles; Victor Gonzaga; Lisa Kearney; Billy Harnist
- Running time: 42 minutes
- Production companies: Hazy Mills Productions; Mission Control Media; Universal Television

Original release
- Network: NBC
- Release: July 11, 2013 – July 5, 2020

Hollywood Game Night is an American television game show that aired on NBC from July 11, 2013, to July 5, 2020. The series, which is hosted by Jane Lynch, follows two contestants who take part in a casual game night with three celebrities each, making the main episode a game between two four-player teams. Five games are played on each episode, with teams accumulating points based on their performance in each of the games. After the fifth game, the contestant on the team with the most points competes in a bonus round with one of the episode's celebrities. The chosen celebrity plays for a chance to win $10,000 for a charity of their choice, while the contestants compete to win $25,000.

The series has generally received positive critical reception and earned relatively modest television ratings, while also inspiring several worldwide adaptions, as well as a party game and mobile app based on the show. The series has been honored with several awards nominations, winning the Writers Guild of America Award for Quiz and Audience Participation for three consecutive years. Lynch, meanwhile, has also been recognized for her performance as host, earning three Primetime Emmy Award nominations for Outstanding Host for a Reality or Reality-Competition Program and winning twice.

== Gameplay ==
Two teams of four players each (consisting of three celebrities and one contestant) play a series of games. The contestant is designated captain of the team. In season five, some episodes are "Show Vs. Show" specials, where each team consists of cast members of a specific show. For example, the first episode of season five was "Veep vs. The Walking Dead".

Five total games are played on each episode. Within each game, teams attempt to score points for their team, with one point awarded for each correct response in rounds one and two, and two points per correct answer in rounds three and four. The fifth and final game awards five points per correct answer, with the team in the lead going first. If both contestants are tied prior to the fifth and final game, then the contestant who won the last game goes first. The contestant with the most points at the end of play wins the game and advances to the $25,000 bonus round. If both contestants are tied at the end of the game, the contestant who won more games will advance to the bonus round.

=== Games ===
Games vary in complexity and subject. Some games require teams to answer questions based upon photographs of celebrities, television programs, or films, while others ask teams to place items in categories or order items based upon a chronological scale. Others feature the teams to identify the brand of grocery products based on pictures of the product or to match pictures to audio clues played for the team. Several other games are based on wordplay, requiring teams to identify subjects for which the vowels have been removed, titles in which the order of words has been shuffled, or titles and phrases which are displayed in a language other than English. Games for which a time limit is involved are typically played for 90 seconds.

=== Bonus round: Celebrity Name Game ===
In the bonus round, "Celebrity Name Game," the winning contestant chooses one of the six celebrities as their partner. (Beginning in season three, this was changed to two celebrities, one from each team). The chosen celebrity begins describing a different celebrity as best they can. For every celebrity the winning contestant identifies correctly, the contestant earns $1,000 and the celebrity receives $1,000 for their charity. If the contestant guesses ten celebrities correctly within 90 seconds, the contestant's winnings are increased to $25,000 and the celebrity partner(s) wins $10,000 for their charity.

== Production ==
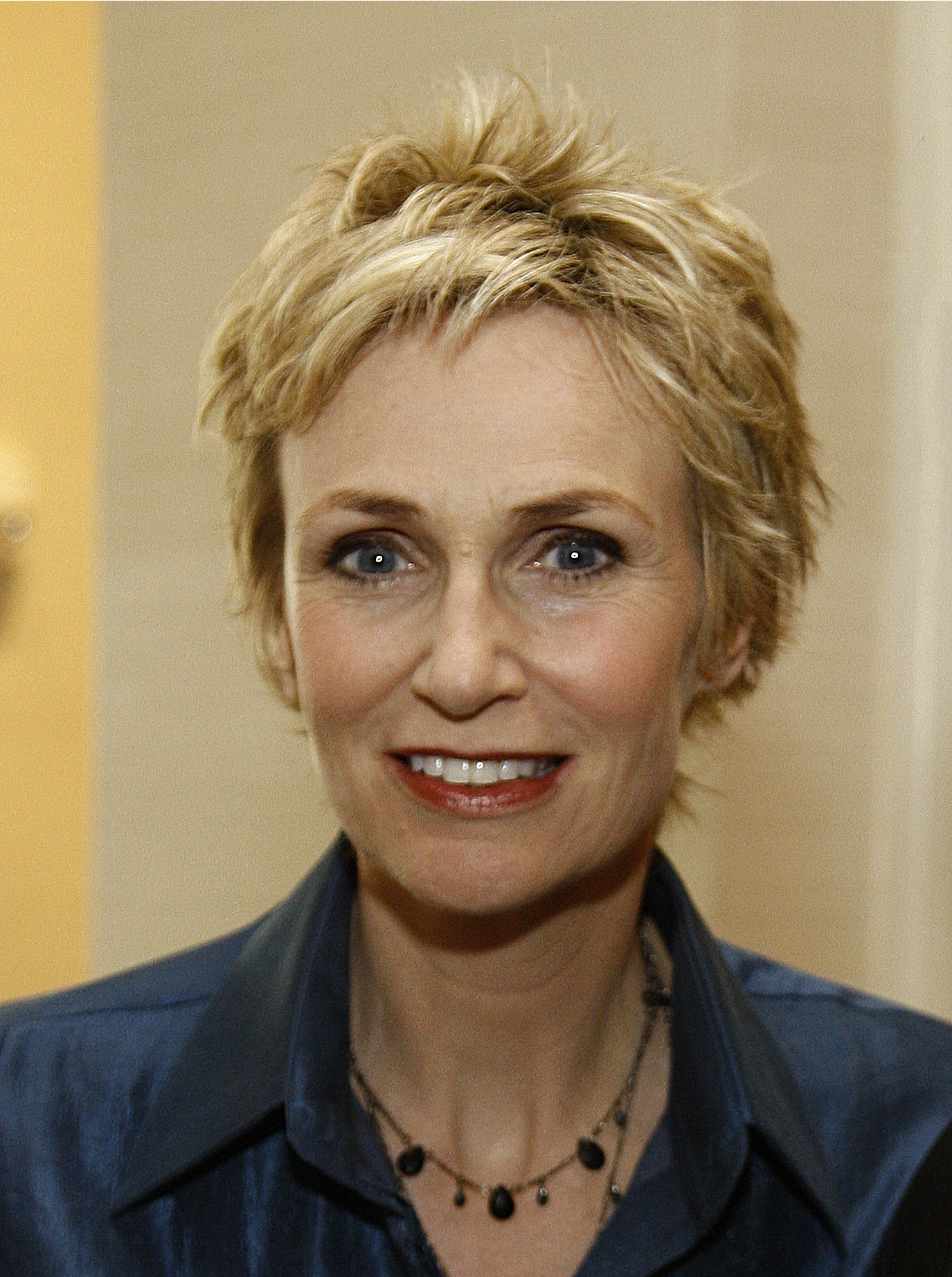
Jane Lynch, host of the series

Created by actor/producer Sean Hayes and producer Todd Milliner, the show was inspired by real-life cocktail party-style game nights held by Hayes and Milliner. "Sean Hayes, the creator of the series, has these notorious game nights that are so much fun, that a variety of people go to because he has a lot of interesting people in his life," Lynch told The Huffington Post. "And he said 'Let's put it on TV,' and NBC said, 'OK!' Before I knew it, I was hosting it, and we rented this mansion that is, ostensibly, mine, and we put couches in there and we got everybody tanked up on booze and we played these games."

NBC announced the series in April 2011 under the then title Celebrity Game Night, changing to its current name when it was ordered and greenlit on December 18, 2012. In February 2013, NBC announced Jane Lynch as the host The first season of Hollywood Game Night premiered on July 11, 2013.

On August 20, 2013, NBC renewed Hollywood Game Night for a ten-episode second season. On April 11, 2017, Game Show Network (GSN) announced its acquisition of the first four seasons, which began airing on April 17, 2017. NBC announced a sixth season of the show in March 2018 which premiered on November 21, 2018.

On May 12, 2020, NBC aired a "Social Distancing Edition" special for Red Nose Day, with teams of celebrities playing remotely from their homes. On May 25, 2020, NBC announced that new episodes would return on June 7, 2020. It is unclear whether these episodes are a continuation of season 6 or part of a new season 7. On some websites, production codes for the social distancing episode and the premiere on June 7, 2020, indicate that they are a part of the 6th season. On other sites, the new episodes are listed as part of a new season 7, but NBC never formally renewed the show for a 7th season.

=== Series overview ===
Season	Episodes	Originally released	
Season	Episodes	First released	Last released
1	8	July 11, 2013	August 29, 2013
2	20	December 23, 2013	July 24, 2014
3	10	July 7, 2015	September 8, 2015
4	12	January 5, 2016	July 28, 2016
5	10	June 22, 2017	September 6, 2017
6	14	November 21, 2018	July 5, 2020

== Reception ==
=== Critical response ===
The show received little advance press, but The Atlantic's Esther Zuckerman was excited at the prospect of celebrities being a part of the show, writing, "Even with everything left unanswered, we're going to give a point to NBC on this one. The mix of celebrities just seems too good to be true." After its premiere, it was reviewed positively by Mary McNamara of the Los Angeles Times, who said, "Fast-paced, with a certain 'learn-as-you-go' air, the premiere episode...supplied a nice number of laughs and the inevitable angsty moments of group competition." Ed Bark, a former television critic at The Dallas Morning News, gave Hollywood Game Night a "B-minus" grade, arguing that "as a silly summertime lark, HGN pretty much hits it out of the park on opening night." Entertainment Weekly's Annie Barrett argued that the show "makes you feel like a genius" and saying "I've never felt smarter in my life." Writing before the season three premiere, The Washington Post's Hank Stuever opined that while "Few things on television could seem more pleasingly old-fashioned and simply entertaining" than the series, it "also serves as another reminder that we live in a sad, unimaginative era of acquiescence to celebrity status."

=== Ratings ===
Hollywood Game Night's ratings were first or tied for first in its timeslot for all eight episodes of season one. The first season averaged 3.7 million viewers; the series premiere was watched by 4.29 million viewers, though the ratings progressively declined, with the season finale only garnering 2.82 million viewers. During the second season, the viewership average over twenty episodes was 3.92 million; the fourth episode of the season set a series high with 5.495 viewers. The series' ten-episode third season saw an average of 4.64 million viewers. In season four, Hollywood Game Night averaged 3.767 million viewers over twelve episodes, with the ratings decreasing slightly as the season progressed. In its fifth season, the series averaged 4.1 million viewers over ten episodes.

=== Accolades ===
Year	Award	Category	Nominee(s)	Result	Ref.
2014	Writers Guild of America	Quiz and Audience Participation	Hollywood Game Night	Won	
2014	Primetime Emmy Award	Outstanding Host for a Reality or Reality-Competition Program	Jane Lynch	Won	
2015	Writers Guild of America	Quiz and Audience Participation	Hollywood Game Night	Won	
2015	Primetime Emmy Award	Outstanding Host for a Reality or Reality-Competition Program	Jane Lynch	Won	
2016	Writers Guild of America	Quiz and Audience Participation	Hollywood Game Night	Won	
2016	Primetime Emmy Award	Outstanding Host for a Reality or Reality-Competition Program	Jane Lynch	Nominated	

== International versions ==
The series' popularity has led it to become a worldwide franchise, having been recreated in several other countries outside of the United States. Versions of Hollywood Game Night have existed in Armenia, Canada, Czech Republic, Finland, France, Greece, Hungary, Iceland, Indonesia, Russia, Spain, Thailand, Turkey, Ukraine, United Kingdom, and Vietnam.

== Merchandise ==
A boxed party game based on the series was released February 15, 2014. Additionally, on July 14, 2015, a mobile version of the game was released for iOS devices.
