= Classic Fantastic =

Studio album by Fun Lovin' Criminals
- Released: March 1, 2010
- Recorded: 2008–2009
- Genre: Jazz rap; Hip-hop; alternative rock; blues; electro-funk; neo-swing
- Length: 42:10
- Label: Kilohertz
- Producer: Fun Lovin' Criminals

Fun Lovin' Criminals chronology
Livin' in the City (2005)	Classic Fantastic (2010)	Fun, Live and Criminal (2011)

Singles from Classic Fantastic
- 1. "Classic Fantastic" Released: 2009; 2. "Mister Sun" Released: 2010

Professional ratings
Review scores
Source	Rating
AllMusic	3.5/5 stars
Drowned in Sound	4/10
NME	0.5/5 stars

Classic Fantastic is the sixth studio album by American rap rock band Fun Lovin' Criminals. It was released on March 1, 2010 via Kilohertz Ltd. Production was handled by Fun Lovin' Criminals themselves. It features guest appearances from Paul Kaye and Roots Manuva.

Barring the Another Mimosa compilation, Classic Fantastic is frontman Huey Morgan's final studio album with the band, before his departure in 2021.

== Track listing ==
No.	Title	Length
1.	"Mars"	3:00
2.	"Classic Fantastic"	4:30
3.	"The Originals"	2:38
4.	"She Sings at the Sun"	3:35
5.	"Keep On Yellin'" (featuring Roots Manuva)	3:12
6.	"Jimi Choo"	2:13
7.	"El Malo"	4:10
8.	"Conversations with Our Attorney" (featuring Paul Kaye)	1:24
9.	"We, the Three"	2:56
10.	"How Low?"	2:37
11.	"Mister Sun"	4:02
12.	"Rewind"	4:00
13.	"Get Your Coat"	3:53
Total length:		42:10

== Personnel ==
- Fun Lovin' Criminals — songwriters, arrangers, producers
- Rodney Hylton "Roots Manuva" Smith — lyrics & vocals (track 5)
- Paul Kaye — lyrics & vocals (track 8)
- Sophie McGinn — artwork, design
- Ralph John Perou — photography
- Sulinna Ong — management

== Charts ==
Chart (2010)	Peak position
Dutch Albums (Album Top 100)	60
Belgian Albums (Ultratop Flanders)	53
UK Independent Albums (OCC)	15
