= Fun Lovin' Criminals (EP) =

EP by Fun Lovin' Criminals

EP by Fun Lovin' Criminals
- Released: November 1995
- Recorded: 1994, 1995
- Genre: Hip hop, alternative rock, funk, jazz rap
- Length: 14:29
- Label: Silver Spotlight

Fun Lovin' Criminals chronology
| Fun Lovin' Criminals (1995) | Come Find Yourself (1996) |

Professional ratings
Review scores
| Source | Rating |
|---|---|
| Allmusic | link |

Fun Lovin' Criminals is the eponymous debut EP by the band Fun Lovin' Criminals. It is also known as Original Soundtrack for Hi-Fi Living.

== Track listing ==
1. "Passive/Aggressive" - 3:36
2. "Blues for Suckers" - 3:50
3. "I Can't Get With That [Schmoove Version]" - 5:33
4. "Coney Island Girl" - 1:30

== Trivia ==
"Blues for Suckers" is actually a Schmoove Version of "Bear Hug", with singing instead of rapping.
