= The Voodoo Lounge =

Coordinates: 53.34665°N 6.27983°W

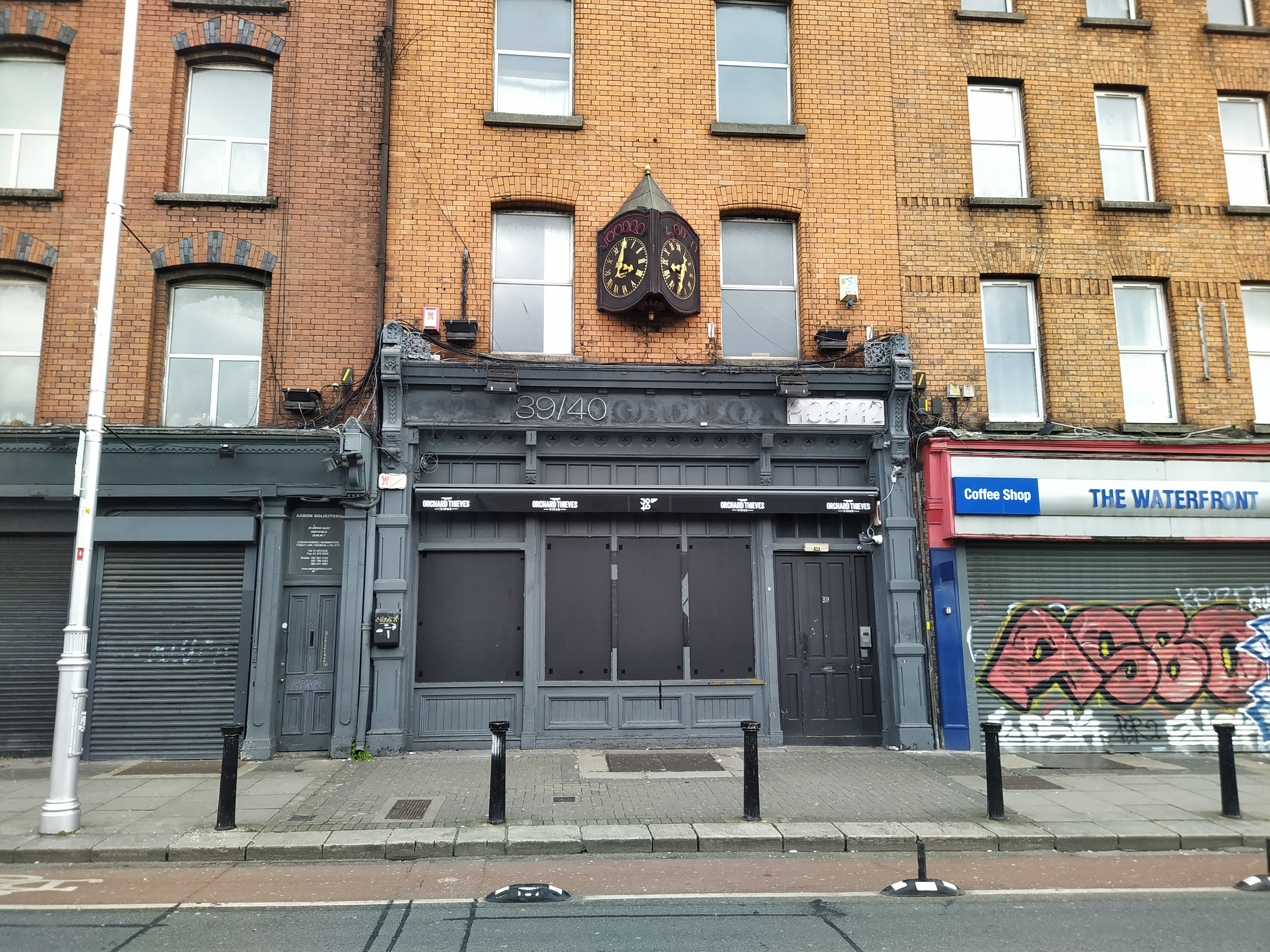
The Voodoo Lounge

The Voodoo Lounge was a bar and club in Arran Quay in Dublin.

The bar was owned by Dermot Doran and Kieran Finnerty and opened in the early 2000s. Huey Morgan also owned a small share in the venue. The company dissolved in 2009 and the venue was later used as a casino, under the name Voodoo Card Club.

In 2013 it was again being used as a music venue under the name Voodoo Lounge.
