= Liza & Huey's Pet Nation =

- Liza, Huey and dog Wilf
- Also known as: Liza And Huey's Pet Nation; Pet Nation
- Directed by: Stuart McDonald
- Presented by: Huey Morgan; Liza Tarbuck
- Starring: Dr. Scott Miller
- Country of origin: United Kingdom
- Original language: English
- No. of series: 1
- No. of episodes: 11

Production
- Running time: 60 minutes (inc. adverts)
- Production company: Twofour

Original release
- Network: Sky1; Sky2
- Release: 26 March – 4 June 2010

Liza & Huey's Pet Nation is a show which shows different celebrities bringing in their pets. It is hosted by Liza Tarbuck and Huey Morgan, with their dog co-host, Wilf.

The ten-part series is an animal celebration that combines home videos with studio based and on location features with guests including Kathy Burke, Bill Bailey, Neil Morrissey and Sue Perkins.

== Episodes ==
After the preview show broadcast on 26 March 2010, it was stated by Liza Tarbuck that the show's first series would be broadcast for the following ten weeks.

Episode Num	Aired as Episode	Title	Airdate	Directed by	Written by	Animals shown	Recipe shown
Series 1 (2010)
1	N/A	Preview show	26 March 2010	Stuart McDonald		Parrots, cats, dogs, birds, horses, pigs, ferrets, owls, crocodiles, tortoises, rabbits, foxes, sheep, skunk, fishes, guinea pigs, goats, chickens and frogs	N/A
2	1	Episode 1	2 April 2010	Stuart McDonald		Dogs	N/A
3	2	Episode 2	9 April 2010	Stuart McDonald		Dogs, monkeys, guinea pig, snake, hamster, stick insect, parrot, cockroach, bear	N/A
4	3	Episode 3	16 April 2010	Stuart McDonald			N/A
5	4	Episode 4	23 April 2010	Stuart McDonald			N/A
6	5	Episode 5	30 April 2010	Stuart McDonald		Dogs, horses, cats	N/A
7	6	Episode 6	7 May 2010	Stuart McDonald		Dogs, crocodiles, meerkats, cats, parrots	
8	7	Episode 7	14 May 2010	Stuart McDonald			
9	8	Episode 8	21 May 2010	Stuart McDonald			
10	9	Episode 9	28 May 2010	Stuart McDonald			
11	10	Unknown	4 June 2010				

== Segments ==
Segment Title	Parody of	Plot	Episode Num
"Pet Nation's Pup Idol!"	Pop Idol	A competition similar to The X Factor and Pop Idol, an animal and its owner try to express their singing talents in front of Liza and Huey	1 and 4
"Britain's Got Talons"	Britain's Got Talent	A competition similar to Britain's Got Talent, an animal tries to express its talents in front of Liza and Huey	1
"Doggy Dancing"	N/A	A dog and its owner perform their dancing talents in front of Liza and Huey	1 and 3
"Table of Terror"	N/A	If a person brings in someone else's pet, they have to forfeit the "Table of Terror" and guess what animal they are feeling	1 and 4
"News Round"	Newsround	News on Pet Nation	3
"Never Mind the Peacocks"	N/A	A person has to guess what you call a group of animals	3
"Animal Roadtest"	N/A	A person tests how clever and cunning an animal is; Test 1: Obiendience, Test 2: Adaptability and Test 3: Innate Behaviour	3
"Newshound"	"News Round"(former segment); Newsround	Animal news around the world	7

== Recipes ==
Recipes from website
Episode Num	Recipe Title	Animal made for
Unknown	Pasta Bark	Dog
N/A	Turkey Jurky	Dog
7	Tabby Terrine	Cat
Recipes in episodes
Episode Num	Recipe Title	Animal made for
1	N/A	N/A
2	N/A	N/A
3	N/A	N/A
4	N/A	N/A
5	N/A	N/A
6	N/A	N/A
7	Tabby Terrine	Cat
Unknown	Pasta Bark	Dog

== International showings ==
Country	Premiere date	Channel	Title
United Kingdom	26 March 2010	Sky1; Sky1 HD	Liza & Huey's Pet Nation
United Kingdom	Unknown	Sky2	Liza & Huey's Pet Nation
