= Livin' in the City =

Studio album by Fun Lovin' Criminals
- Released: August 16, 2005
- Recorded: February 14–20, 2005
- Studio: The Magic Shop (New York, NY)
- Length: 44:01
- Label: Sanctuary
- Producer: Fun Lovin' Criminals

Fun Lovin' Criminals chronology
A's, B's and Rarities (2004)	Livin' in the City (2005)	Classic Fantastic (2010)

Singles from Livin' in the City
- 1. "Mi Corazon" Released: August 2005

Professional ratings
Review scores
Source	Rating
laut.de	3/5 stars
The Guardian	2/5 stars

Livin' in the City is the fifth studio album by American rap rock band Fun Lovin' Criminals. It was released on August 16, 2005 via Sanctuary Records. Recording sessions took place at The Magic Shop in New York City from February 14, 2005 to February 20, 2005. Production was handled by Fun Lovin' Criminals themselves with Tim Latham serving as additional producer.

The album peaked at number 57 on the UK Albums Chart, number 50 on the Scottish Albums chart and number 11 on the UK Independent Albums chart in the United Kingdom, and number 89 on the Dutch Album Top 100.

== Track listing ==
No.	Title	Length
1.	"I Love Livin' in the City"	3:45
2.	"How It Be"	3:57
3.	"That Ain't Right"	3:06
4.	"The Preacher"	2:47
5.	"Ballad of NYC"	5:36
6.	"Is Ya Alright"	2:52
7.	"Gave Up on God"	4:55
8.	"City Boy"	3:14
9.	"Girl with the Scar"	4:23
10.	"Mi Corazon"	3:25
11.	"Will I Be Ready"	6:01
Total length:		44:01

== Personnel ==
- Fun Lovin' Criminals — songwriters, arrangers, producers, mixing
- Gaz Birtles — saxophone, flute
- Tim Latham — additional producer, recording, mixing, photography
- Matt Boynton — recording assistant
- Chris Petro — mixing assistant
- George Marino — mastering
- Gabriel Hunter — design
- Simon Watson — management

== Charts ==
Chart (2005)	Peak position
Dutch Albums (Album Top 100)	89
Scottish Albums (OCC)	50
UK Albums (OCC)	57
UK Independent Albums (OCC)	11
