= Diamonds Are Forever (song) =

1971 single by Shirley Bassey

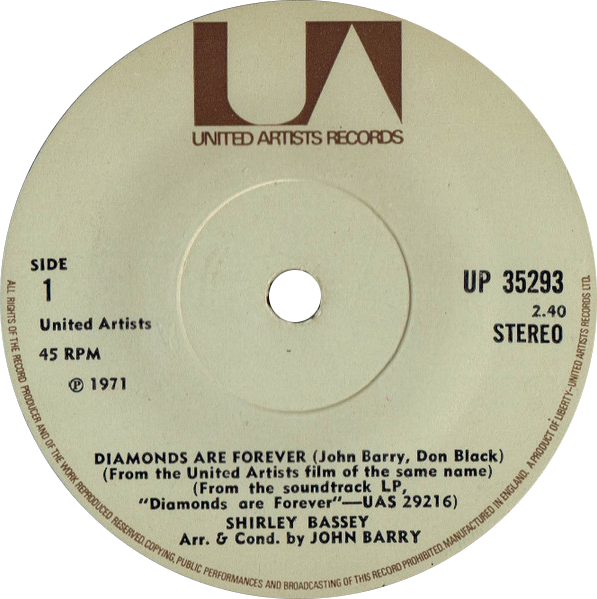
- Solid centre variant of the UK single

Single by Shirley Bassey

from the album Diamonds Are Forever
- B-side: "Pieces of Dreams"
- Released: 1971
- Recorded: October 1971
- Studio: CTS Studios, London
- Genre: Pop
- Length: 2:40
- Label: United Artists
- Songwriters: Don Black (lyrics); John Barry (music)
- Producer: John Barry

James Bond themes singles chronology
"We Have All the Time in the World" (1969)	"Diamonds Are Forever" (1971)	"Live and Let Die" (1973)

Audio sample
- file; help

"Diamonds Are Forever" is a song performed by Welsh singer Shirley Bassey, recorded for the soundtrack of the 1971 James Bond film of the same name. The song was composed by John Barry, with lyrics by Don Black. It was the second James Bond theme performed by Bassey, following her 1964 hit "Goldfinger". The single was released in November 1971 by United Artists Records.

== Background and recording ==
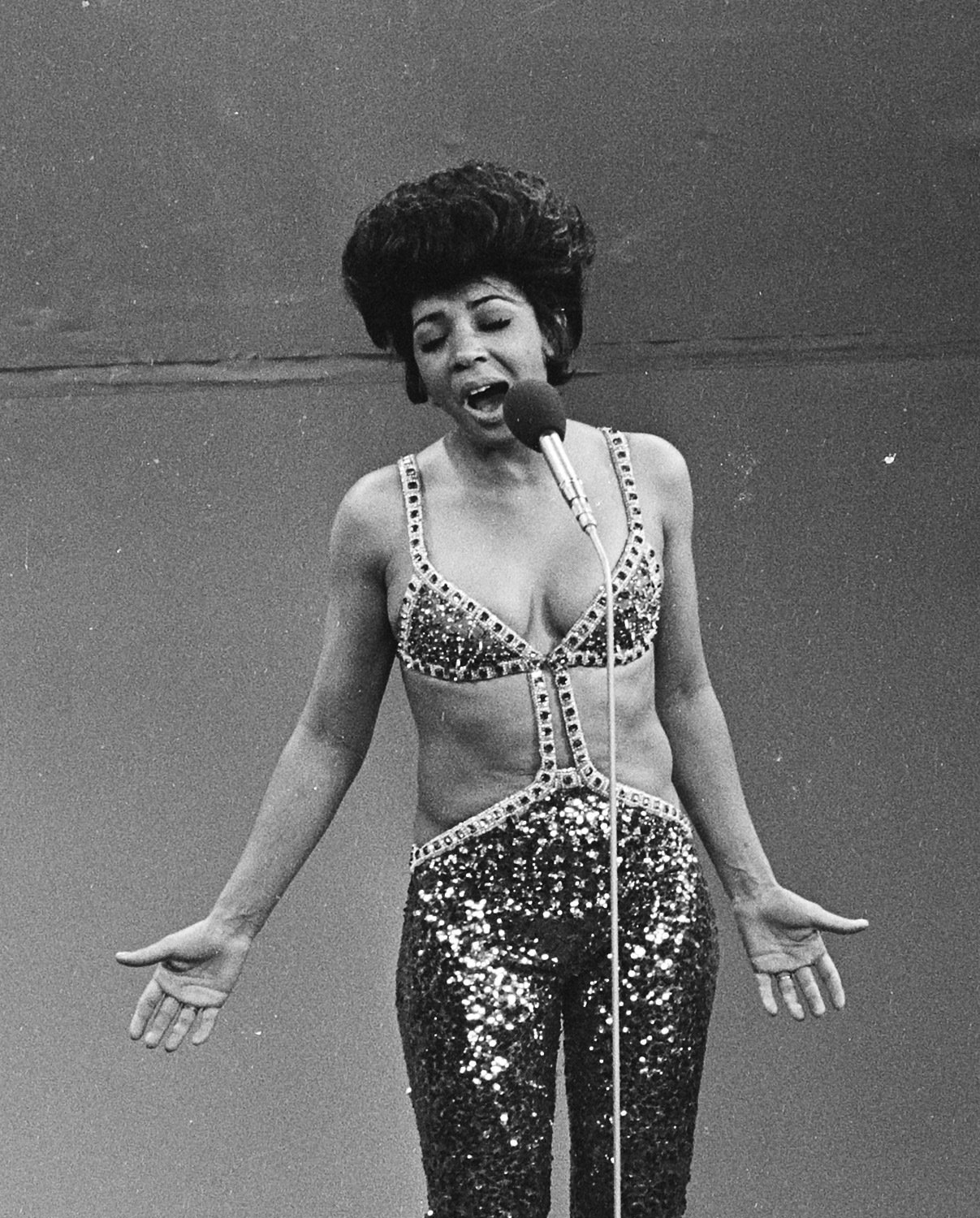
Shirley Bassey, 1971

Following the success of "Goldfinger", John Barry returned to the James Bond franchise to score Diamonds Are Forever. He reunited with lyricist Don Black, with whom he had collaborated on the theme for Thunderball. The producers, Harry Saltzman and Albert R. Broccoli, disagreed over the suitability of the song. Saltzman reportedly disliked the lyrics, finding the sexual innuendo objectionable. Barry later recalled that Saltzman believed the lyrics were overly suggestive, specifically interpreting the song's references to diamonds as metaphors for the penis. Despite Saltzman's demand that the song be rewritten, Broccoli approved the track, and it remained in the film. Shirley Bassey was chosen to perform the track, marking her return to the franchise. The recording session took place in October 1971 at CTS Studios in London. During the recording, Barry encouraged Bassey to deliver a vocal performance that matched the suggestiveness of the lyrics. Putter Smith, the jazz musician who played the assassin Mr. Kidd in the film, would later play bass for Bassey during live performances, although Bassey was reportedly unaware of his role in the film.

== Composition ==
"Diamonds Are Forever" is a pop song written in the key of B minor. The song is structured in an A-A-B-A-B-A form where A is the verse and B is the bridge / refrain. The composition relies on functional harmony, utilizing an unusual i–iv–VII-iv-bII-VII progression in the verse that can be thought of as substitutions from a foundational I-IV-V-I progression. The bridge / refrain also similarly emphasizes the Neapolitan bII chord as a predominant. The song opens with an eight-note motif played on an electronic organ, designed to mimic the "sparkling" quality of a diamond. This figure persists throughout the track, often implying a Bm(add9) (minor ninth) chord to create a dissonant, glamorous sound. Lyrically, the song personifies diamonds as reliable lovers that, unlike men, do not lie or leave. Don Black's lyrics were intended to reflect the materialism and cynicism of the film's setting in Las Vegas. The original plan for the song included an additional verse featuring the lyrics "Diamonds are forever / I can taste the satisfaction / Flawless physical attraction," but this was cut from the final version due to running time constraints. The track concludes with a coda in which Bassey repeats the word "forever" in a series of echoing phrases, culminating in a sustained final note.

== Release and reception ==
The song was released as a single in the United Kingdom in January 1972. It entered the UK Singles Chart on 15 January 1972, peaking at number 38 and remaining on the chart for six weeks. While it did not replicate the top-ten success of "Goldfinger", "Diamonds Are Forever" became one of Bassey's signature songs and a staple of her live performances. Critical reception to the song has generally been positive in the decades following its release. It is often cited alongside "Goldfinger" as one of the defining songs of the James Bond series. In a review for the film's soundtrack, critics noted that while Barry's score for the film was less dramatic than his previous work on On Her Majesty's Secret Service, the title song was a "good, solid" addition to the Bond canon.

The song was also recorded in Italian by Bassey as "Una cascata di diamanti (Vivo di diamanti)" for the Italian version's end credits; this version was only issued on 7-inch single in Italy, and was intended to be included in a (cancelled) 3-CD box set titled Shirley released in 2012.

Variety ranked the eponymous theme song as the best Bond title theme, noting how it was "one of the sexiest songs ever written", despite the song's meaning.

=== Weekly charts ===
Chart (1972)	Peak position
UK Singles (Official Charts)	38
US Billboard Hot 100	57
US Hot R&B/Hip-Hop Songs (Billboard)	14

== Legacy and sampling ==
The song has been covered and sampled by various artists:

- In 2005, American hip hop artist Kanye West sampled "Diamonds Are Forever" for his song "Diamonds from Sierra Leone", which appeared on his album Late Registration. The track uses a sped-up, looped sample of Bassey's vocals. Bassey was initially unaware of the sample and expressed surprise upon hearing it, later commenting that she intended to seek legal advice regarding the unauthorized use of her voice. However, the legal clearance for the sample had been handled by the copyright holders of the recording, not Bassey herself.
- "Psychology" by Dead Prez from their 2000 album Let's Get Free.
- "WTF" by LMF (2003)
- "Conflict Diamonds" by Lupe Fiasco (2006)
- "Dope Dealer" by Meek Mill featuring Rick Ross and Nicki Minaj from his 2013 mixtape Dreamchasers 3.

== Cover versions ==
- In 2007, the Arctic Monkeys performed a cover of "Diamonds Are Forever" during their headline set at the Glastonbury Festival. A studio version appears on their Domino Records' compilation CD album, All the Rage.
- German synthpop group Alphaville covered the song on their album CrazyShow in 2003. Another cover of the song was later released on the 2022 orchestral album Eternally Yours.
- The song was also covered by British vocalist David McAlmont in 1997.
