= International versions of Hollywood Game Night =

Hollywood Game Night is an international television game show franchise of American origin, in which contestants take part in a casual game night with celebrities. The original American version debuted on July 11, 2013 on NBC.

Country	Local title	Host(s)	Channel	Year	Refs
Armenia	3/OFF (Yerekov)	Artyom Hakobyan	Armenia TV	2017	
Armenia	Նոր խաղ New Game	Artyom Hakobyan	New Armenia	2020	
Bulgaria	Игрите на звездите Games of stars	Katerina Evro	BTV	2019	
Canada	Silence, on joue! Quiet, we're playing!	Patrice L'Écuyer	Ici Radio-Canada Télé	September 7, 2015 – present	
Czech Republic	Hvězdná Párty; Stellar Party	Petr Rychlý	TV Nova	2016	
Finland	Game Night	Jaakko Saariluoma	MTV3	2017	
France	Canapé Quiz; Sofa Quiz	Arnaud Tsamere	TMC	February 24 – March 14, 2014	
Germany	Promi Game Night; Celebrity Game Night	Caroline Frier	RTL Zwei	May 4, 2023 – present	
Greece; Cyprus	Celebrity Game Night	Smaragda Karydi	Mega Channel	March 27, 2014 – present	
Greece; Cyprus	Celebrity Game Night	Thodoris Atheridis	ANT1	2018	
Hungary	Gyertek át! / Gyertek át szombat este! Come Over! / Come Over Saturday Night!	Balázs Sebestyén	RTL Klub	September 12, 2015 – June 6, 2019	
Hungary	Gyertek át! / Gyertek át szombat este! Come Over! / Come Over Saturday Night!	Balázs Sebestyén	RTL+	November 17, 2022 – July 28, 2023	
Iceland	Spilakvöld; Game Night	Pétur Jóhann Sigfússon	Stöð 2	October 10, 2015 – December 3, 2016	
Indonesia	Celebrity Game Show	Indra Herlambang	RTV	2014	
Philippines	Celebrity Playtime	Billy Crawford; Luis Manzano	ABS-CBN	2015	
Romania	Jocuri de celebritate Celebrity games	Mihai Bobonete	Pro TV	September 14, 2016 – May 11, 2017	
Russia	Подмосковные вечера Moscow Nights	Alexey Likhnitsky; Roman Yunusov	Channel One	February 21, 2016 – March 26, 2016	
Russia	Дело было вечером It Was Night	Mikhail Shats	STS	2019–2020	
Serbia	Holivudiranje; Hollywoodization	Nikola Djuricko	Una TV	2023	
South Africa	Celebrity Game Night	Anele Mdoda	E! South Africa	2019	
Spain	Jugamos en Casa; Playing at Home	Los Morancos	La 1	2015	
Sweden	Alla för en All for one	Katrin Sundberg; Josefin Johansson	SVT1	September 14, 2018 – October 26, 2019	
Thailand	ซุป'ตาร์ปาร์ตี้ Celebrity Game Night; Superstar Party Celebrity Game Night	Willy McIntosh	ONE HD	August 7, 2014 – August 26, 2016	
Thailand	ฮอลลีวูดเกมไนท์ไทยแลนด์ Hollywood Game Night Thailand	Willy McIntosh	Channel 3	November 4, 2017 – February 3, 2018	
Thailand	ฮอลลีวูดเกมไนท์ไทยแลนด์ Hollywood Game Night Thailand	Willy McIntosh	Channel 3	August 25, 2018 – February 16, 2019	
Thailand	ฮอลลีวูดเกมไนท์ไทยแลนด์ Hollywood Game Night Thailand	Willy McIntosh	Channel 3	May 9, 2019 – July 17, 2022	
Thailand	ฮอลลีวูดเกมไนท์ไทยแลนด์ Hollywood Game Night Thailand	Willy McIntosh	Channel 3	August 6, 2023 – December 21, 2025	
Thailand	ฮอลลีวูดเกมไนท์ไทยแลนด์ Hollywood Game Night Thailand	Willy McIntosh	Mono 29	July 24, 2022 – July 16, 2023	
Turkey	Saba Tümer ile Oyuna Geldik/Saba ile Oyuna Geldik; We Came To the Game with Saba Tumer/We Came To the Game with Saba	Saba Tümer	TV8	2015	
Ukraine	Добрый вечер на Интере; Good evening on Inter	Andriy Domanskyi	Inter	2016	
United Kingdom	Celebrity Game Night/Comedy Game Night	Liza Tarbuck	Channel 5 (2019); Comedy Central (2020)	April 5, 2019 – May 3, 2019, September 2, 2020 – November 4, 2020	
United States	Hollywood Game Night	Jane Lynch	NBC	July 11, 2013 – July 5, 2020	
United States	New Year's Eve Game Night	Andy Cohen	NBC	2015	
Vietnam	Đêm tiệc cùng sao (Hollywood Game Night); Party Night with Stars (Hollywood Game Night)	Bùi Đại Nghĩa	VTV3	2017	

== See also ==
- List of television game show franchises
