= Frank Benbini =

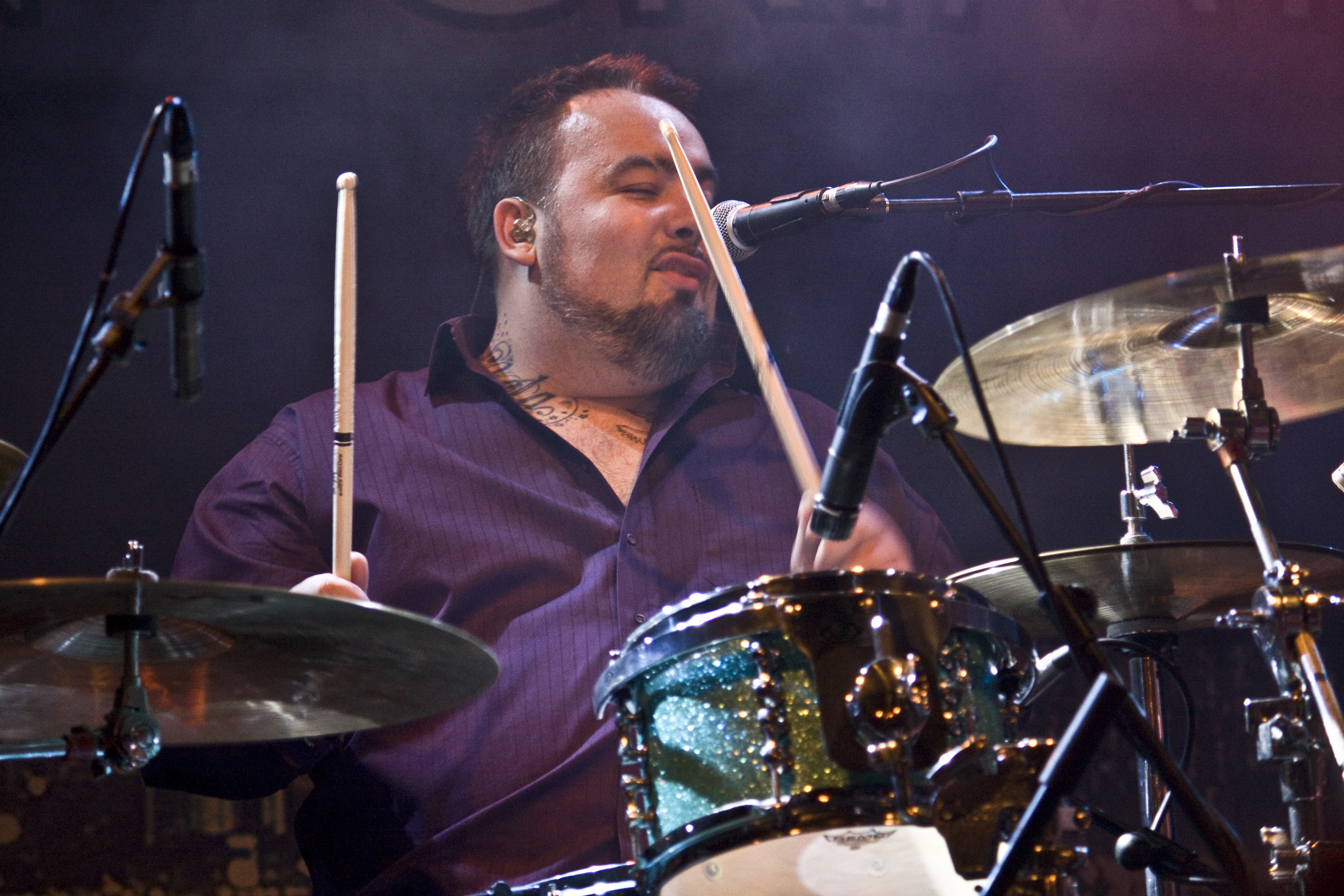
- Benbini in Barcelona in 2010

Background information
- Also known as: Uncle Frank, TRM
- Born: Mark Francis Reid; 21 September 1976 (age 49); Leicester, England
- Genres: Alternative rock, hip-hop, jazz, reggae, funk
- Occupations: Musician, songwriter, record producer, radio DJ
- Instruments: Vocals, drums
- Years active: 2003–present

Frank Benbini (born Mark Francis Reid, 21 September 1976 in Leicester, England) is the British drummer and one third of Fun Lovin' Criminals (FLC). He is also known as Uncle Frank and TRM which stands for "The Rhythm Man". Benbini is a singer, record producer, songwriter and director.

Benbini joined FLC as their drummer in May 2003 – although he had known the band for many years previously (their first meeting was at Rock City in Nottingham in 1996) – after having worked for a while as the previous drummer Mackie's technician. Along with drumming, Benbini also provides backing vocals to tracks on FLC's more recent albums and when performing live with the FLC.

Benbini is also one half of the Make It Nice Brothers with Naim Cortazzi (a multi instrumentalist and producer). Based in Leicester, England, the Make It Nice Brothers perform in two bands, Uncle Frank and Fatal Star. These two bands each have different musical styles to the Fun Lovin' Criminals - Uncle Frank first being described as "the music from the Jungle Book blended with Barry White's lush soul vibe and some genius songwriting a la Burt Bacharach" and Fatal Star as "devastating campfire harmonies with a mystical eastern edge for arrangements. Delicate, Melodic, Soulful food for hungry dreamers".

Uncle Frank were signed to a three-album deal in 2013 by MITA Records executive David Rogers. Uncle Frank's debut label album Smiles for Miles was released in May 2014 and was described by Penny Black Music as an album "full of classic, quirky and lovestruck songs". The band's second single "Somethin' Somethin'" accompanied by a robot animation video was featured by The Daily Express "Frank Benbini and Naim Cortazzi, have spent years making music and their remarkable output ranges from soul to funk and old-school hip hop".

In 2017, Uncle Frank released the album Love Lion which received strong reviews in the indie press. "There wasn't a song on Love Lion I didn't like." The chords in each track and the melodies were all beautifully tied together, and really soothing to listen to."

The singles ("Love Lion", "Fountains" and "Tokyo") videos, which accompanied the album, came to the attention of BBC Radio 2 radio and television presenter Craig Charles who featured Uncle Frank on his radio show, as well as inviting the band to support him on his sold out Funk and Soul Club. He would later describe the band, saying "They tore the stage apart, Uncle Frank, my favourite live band of 2018."

In 2018 Benbini began presenting a regular Sunday evening radio show on BBC Radio Leicester.

Benbini and Naim Cortazzi are co-founders of Make it Nice Records which is currently the home of Uncle Frank's releases.

Benbini dipped his toes into the realms of acting, being part of the sequel to FLC's film Maui Homicide (currently titled Maui Homicide 2) and also appearing with fellow band member Huey Morgan in Brit flick Clubbing To Death (2008).
