= Smaragda Karydi =

Greek actress

- Σμαράγδα Καρύδη
- Born: 9 August 1969 (age 56); Athens, Greece
- Citizenship: Greece
- Education: National Theatre of Greece Drama School
- Years active: 1988–present
- Television: Sto Para Pente
- Partner: Thodoris Atheridis
- Parent(s): Dinos Karydis; Julia Argyropoulou

Smaragda Karydi (Greek: Σμαράγδα Καρύδη) is a Greek TV and stage actress. She came into prominence playing the role of Dahlia in the TV series Sto Para Pente and later the TV series Fila ton vatraho sou (Frog or not) co-starring with Τhodoris Atheridis.

== Early days ==
Smaragda was born on 9 August 1969, and is the daughter of actors Dinos Karydis (1938–2024) (whom she later starred with in Fila ton vatraho sou) (Frog or not) and Tzoulia Argyropoulos.

She graduated from the Drama School of the Greek National Theatre and has worked as an actress in the Greek television in primary and secondary roles in the series. From 2005 until 2007 she has had one of the main roles in the popular TV series Sto Para Pente.

She has also starred in the films Thiliki Etairia written by Nikos Perakis in 1999, O kalyteros mou filos written by Lakis Lazopoulos and the cinema adaptation of the theatrical play Mia melissa ton Avgousto written by Thodoris Atheridis in 2007.

In the theatre she has starred in the plays Apo erota, Mia melissa ton Avgousto, and Sinevi kai opoios thelei to pistevei written and directed by Thodoris Atheridis.

== Filmography ==
=== Film ===
Year	Title	Role	Notes	Ref.
1972	Love Agreement	baby	Film debut	
1993	Starry Dome	Ismini		
1994	Late Night	client		
1996	Towards freedom			
1999	Female Company	Angela Papa		
2001	My Best Friend	Andrea		
2001	Ghost of a chance	casino player		
2002	Wannabees		voice role	
2004	The Incredibles	Helen Parr / Elastigirl	voice role	
2005	Woman is a hardcore person	Fani		
2007	A bee in August	Maria Giannadoudaki		
2008	Bolt	Mittens	voice role	
2009	The Heiress	Vera Skariba		
2014	Thursday & 12	Adamantia Fountouki		
2014	With and without women	Nadia		
2014	By love	Anna		
2016	Perfect Strangers	Eri		
2022	Dodo	Mariella		
2023	More Than Strangers			

=== Television ===
Year	Title	Role	Notes
1989	Be quiet... the country is sleeping		Episode: "End... or anyway?"
1993	Dyed Red Hair	Litsa	4 episodes
1993	Anatomy of a crime	Irene Deligianni	Episode: "Blind devotion"
1994	Anatomy of a crime	Daphne Georgiadi	Episode: "Closed circuit"
1994	The Exchangers	Monica Manesi	1 episode
1996-1997	The colour of the moon	Marouso Stathaki	Lead role, 18 episodes
1997	Because of Honour	Chloe	8 episodes
1997	Double Truth	Alexia	Episode: "In one body"
1997	Double Truth	prostitute	Episode: "The time of shadows"
1997	Double Truth	Ersi	Episode: "Wrong hopes"
1997	A night like this	Rena	Episode: "Abyssal Paths"
1997	A night like this	Eleni Michalopoulou	Episode: "For the heart of Achilles"
1998	For You	Elvira	Lead role, 13 episodes
1998	Late night news	Nena Delopoulou	2 episodes
1998-1999	The flapping of the seagull		Lead role, 22 episodes
1999	Eroica	theatre actress	1 episode
2000-2001	Innocent or guilty	Eleni	Lead role, 34 episodes
2001	Red Circle	Angeliki	Episode: "Women's Day"
2001	Red Circle	Katerina Stavropoulou	Episode: "The professionals"
2001	Red Circle	Katerina	Episode: "Heaven"
2001	Red Circle	Eleni	Episode: "Merry Christmas"
2001-2002	Gulf of Grosso		Lead role, 22 episodes
2002-2003	If you only knew!	Litsa Phanarioti	Lead role, 25 episodes
2003	White House	Danae	Lead role, 17 episodes
2004	The Nanny	Demy Zacharopoulou	1 episode
2004	The bees		1 episode
2004-2005	Babalu	Christina	Lead role, 16 episodes
2005	Seven Deadly Mothers-In-Law	Jo	Episode: "The Mother-In-Law from Constantinople"
2005	Safe Sex TV Stories	Sandra	Episode: "Barbarella is dead"
2005-2007	In the nick of time	Dalia Chatzialexandrou	Lead role, 49 episodes
2007	Jugerman	Katerina MacLee	4 episodes
2007-2009	Kiss your frog	Olga Pavlidou	Lead role, 58 episodes
2010	Star Wars	Julia Papafloratou	Episode: "I and him"
2012	Back Home	Aleka Giouleka	Episode: "Test in ancient Greek"
2014	Through This	Lilika	Episode: "Babis"
2014-2016	Celebrity Game Night	Herself (host)	Game show; season 1-3
2015	National Team	Niki Angelidi	Lead role, 15 episodes
2017-2018	Nota Mia	Herself (host)	Daytime game show on ALPHA
2018	MadWalk - The Fashion Music Project	Herself (performance)	TV special
2020-2021	One million Yen	Herself (host)	Daytime game show
2020-2021	Don't start grumbling	Nana Kalamba	7 episodes
2021-2023	Celebrity Game Night	Herself (host)	Game show; season 5-7
2023–present	IQ 160	Penelope Mouriki	Lead role, 40 episodes
2025	Ta Tetragona ton asteron (Hollywood Squares)	Herself (host)	Game show; season 4
2025	In the Nick of Time - 20 Years Later	Dalia Chatzialexandrou	TV special

=== Theatre ===
- Apo Erota (Από έρωτα)
- Mia Melissa Ton Avgousto (Μια μέλισσα τον Αύγουστο)
- Synevi ki opis theli to pistevi (Συνέβη κι όποιος θέλει το πιστεύει)
- The Witches of Smyrna (Οι Μάγισσες της Σμύρνης)
- The Wedding of Koutroulis (Του Κουτρούλη ο γάμος)
- Noises Off (Το σώσε)
