= Come Find Yourself =

Studio album by Fun Lovin' Criminals
- Released: February 20, 1996
- Recorded: April 25, 1995 – May 20, 1995
- Genres: Rap; rock; blues
- Length: 56:30
- Labels: Silver Spotlight; EMI; Chrysalis
- Producer: Fun Lovin' Criminals

Fun Lovin' Criminals chronology
Fun Lovin' Criminals (1995)	Come Find Yourself (1996)	100% Colombian (1998)

Singles from Come Find Yourself
- 1. "The Grave and the Constant" Released: June 1996; 2. "Scooby Snacks" Released: August 1996; 3. "The Fun Lovin' Criminal" Released: November 1996; 4. "King of New York" Released: March 1997; 5. "I'm Not in Love"/"Scooby Snacks" Released: July 1997

Come Find Yourself is the debut studio album by the American band Fun Lovin' Criminals. It was released on February 20, 1996, by Chrysalis Records.

== Critical reception ==
Professional ratings
Review scores
Source	Rating
AllMusic	3/5 stars
Muzik	2/5 stars
NME	8/10
PopMatters	8/10
Q	4/5 stars
Rolling Stone	3/5 stars

The Calgary Herald wrote: "The rap 'n' roll beauty of New York's Fun Lovin' Criminals is that this feisty threesome not only take aim at the system but have real brain power beneath their toques, they not only reach deep into their grab-bag of sample tricks (from Pulp Fiction dialogue to musical bits) but the trio of Huey, Fast & Steve play their instruments in a way that drives the groove home, from power-chords and blues-jazz riffs, to James Bond variations and gritty, funky rap riddims." The Independent concluded that "this is one of the most infectious rap albums of the year, boasting a range of musical influences way beyond the narrow confines of tired old G-funk, and re-introducing rap to its roots in the blues."

== Track listing ==
All tracks written by Fun Lovin' Criminals, except where noted.

1. "The Fun Lovin' Criminal" – 3:13
2. "Passive/Aggressive" – 3:33
3. "The Grave and the Constant" – 4:47
4. "Scooby Snacks" – 3:05
5. "Smoke 'Em" – 4:46
6. "Bombin' the L" – 3:51
7. "I Can't Get with That" – 4:25
8. "King of New York" – 3:47
9. "We Have All the Time in the World" (John Barry, Hal David) – 3:41
10. "Bear Hug" – 3:28
11. "Come Find Yourself" – 4:20
12. "Crime and Punishment" – 3:20
13. "Methadonia" – 4:06
14. "I Can't Get with That (Schmoove Version)" (bonus track) – 5:34
15. "Coney Island Girl" (bonus track) – 1:28

== Personnel ==
- Huey Morgan – vocals (all), guitar (all but 10)
- Brian Leiser – bass (1–4, 6, 12, 15), keyboard (3, 7–9, 11, 13–14), trumpet (1, 3, 5, 8–9, 11, 13–14), harmonica (1, 6, 10, 13, 15)
- Steve Borgovini – drums (all), percussion (10, 14)
- Fun Lovin' Criminals – production
- Tim Latham – engineering
- Tsukasa Tobiishi – cover photography

== Charts ==
Chart performance for Come Find Yourself
Chart (1996)	Peak position
Australian Albums (ARIA)	62
Belgian Albums (Ultratop Flanders)	19
Belgian Albums (Ultratop Wallonia)	23
Dutch Albums (Album Top 100)	51
German Albums (Offizielle Top 100)	66
New Zealand Albums (RMNZ)	30
Scottish Albums (Official Charts)	5
UK Albums (Official Charts)	7
US Billboard 200	144

== Certifications ==
Certifications and sales for Come Find Yourself
Region	Certification	Certified units/sales
Netherlands (NVPI)	Gold	50,000^{^}
United Kingdom (BPI)	Platinum	300,000^{^}
^{^} Shipments figures based on certification alone.
