= We Have All the Time in the World =

- 1994 single re-release

Single by Louis Armstrong

from the album On Her Majesty's Secret Service
- B-side: "Pretty Little Missy"
- Released: 1969, 1994 (re-released)
- Genre: Jazz
- Length: 3:15
- Label: Warner Bros.
- Composer: John Barry
- Lyricist: Hal David
- Producer: Phil Ramone

Louis Armstrong singles chronology
"The Kinda Love Song" (1969)	"We Have All the Time in the World" (1969)	"Give Peace a Chance" (1970)

James Bond theme singles chronology
"You Only Live Twice" (1967)	"We Have All The Time In The World" (1969)	"Diamonds Are Forever" (1971)

Audio sample
- file; help

"We Have All the Time in the World" is a James Bond theme song performed by Louis Armstrong. Its music was composed by John Barry and the lyrics by Hal David. It was written for, and used in, the 1969 Bond film On Her Majesty's Secret Service. The title of the song refers to James Bond's final words in the film, spoken after the death of his wife, Tracy Bond.

== Recording ==
Barry chose the jazz trumpeter and vocalist Louis Armstrong, then aged 68 and in poor health, to perform the song because he felt he could "deliver the title line with irony".

The recording took place in October 1969. Armstrong had not recorded since July 1968. He is rumoured to have recorded his vocal in a single take. There are rumours that Armstrong was too ill to play trumpet, but later that day he played a trumpet solo on Pretty Little Missy. At least one photo taken at the time of the session remains.

Armstrong photographer Jack Bradley later wrote "After over a year's lay-off, Louis made his first professional engagement on October 23. The occasion was a record date to do the theme song of a new James Bond movie. Accompanying Louis was a large string section including five basses (among them Milt Hinton, Jack Lesberg and Ron Carter). Derek Smith was on piano and John Barry was the arranger and musical director. The title tune was All The Time In The World, a love ballad which will appear on the movie soundtrack. Pops also made a second side, a slow version of his and Billy Kyle's Pretty Little Missy (arranged by Torrie Zito) on which he not only sang but blew his horn gloriously! It was thrilling to see his chops in such great shape. These two titles will be issued on an United States single."

Louis Armstrong died of a heart attack less than 2 years later. His vocal performance of the song "We Have All the Time in the World" proved to be his last ever recording.

== Use in film ==
For the title sequence at the start of the film, an instrumental composition is used – something only done a few times in the history of the Bond film franchise.

Instead, the filmmakers chose to insert the film soundtrack's more popularly-appealing song later on in On Her Majesty's Secret Service: during the Bond–Tracy courtship montage, bridging Draco's birthday party in Portugal and Bond's burglary of the Gebrüder Gumbold law office in Bern, Switzerland, and at the end of the film.

As one reviewer puts it, "...it’s easy to forget the devastating way it is used in the film, where it turned out that Bond and Tracy did not in fact have all the time in the world after all."

"We Have All the Time in the World" returned briefly to the Bond universe when it was reused the closing credits of the 2021 Bond film No Time to Die.

== Release ==
"We Have All the Time in the World" was released as a single in the US and the UK (under the title "All the Time in the World" in the UK) to coincide with the release of On Her Majesty's Secret Service in December 1969, but did not chart in either market.

In 1994, "We Have All the Time in the World" was rereleased in the UK after it was used in a Guinness commercial (Chain), after My Bloody Valentine covered it for charity for the 1993 compilation Peace Together. Armstrong's version was released on vinyl and CD and reached No. 3 on the UK singles chart and No. 4 on the Irish Singles Chart. In 2005, a BBC survey found it to be the third most popular love song played at weddings.

== Charts ==
Chart (1994)	Peak position
Ireland (IRMA)	4
UK Singles (OCC)	3
UK Airplay (Music Week)	11

=== Year-end charts ===
Chart (1994)	Position
UK Singles (OCC)	29

== Cover versions ==
Fun Lovin' Criminals recorded and released a few versions of the song, most notably a cover recorded in 1995 of the song, released on their 1995 U.S. promo album and 1996 U.S. and U.K. album releases, "Come Find Yourself". The album-version of the song runs 3 minutes, 38 seconds. The song was released, as well, in a preceding U.K. promo 12" single version in 1995. The track was also included in their four-track 1997 maxi single/extended EP "We Have All The Time in the World" (released in a handful of countries in Europe). Fun Lovin' Criminals' cover version releases of the song retain the original song-writing credits from the 1960s Bond movie song (John Berry and Hal David).

A live performance version was also included in Fun Lovin' Criminals' one and only live recordings release, a triple album (CD) entitled "Fun, Live and Criminal", which was released in August 2011 in the U.K. by their former record label Kilohertz. The live version of the song's runtime is 4 minutes, 5 seconds.

Other cover versions of the song have also been made in the decades since the original Bond movie song was released – almost eighty of them, in fact – with the bulk of them recorded and released following the Fun Lovin' Criminals interpretation.

The song also had three foreign adaptations of the song released, over the past six decades:

- Meu Amor o Tempo e o Mundo – written by Arnaud Rodrigues – in Portuguese (released in 1970).
- Il silenzio vale più delle parole – written by Daniele Pace – in Italian (released in May 1972).
- Aamun toit mun maailmaan – written by Jukka Itkonen – in Finnish (released in 1991).

== See also ==
- On Her Majesty's Secret Service (1969 soundtrack)
- Music of the James Bond series
- The Best of Bond... James Bond
- James Bond: Every theme song from the film franchise's history
