= Loco (Fun Lovin' Criminals song) =

2001 single by Fun Lovin' Criminals

Single by Fun Lovin' Criminals

from the album Loco
- Released: February 5, 2001
- Studio: The Magic Shop (New York City)
- Length: 3:53
- Label: EMI; Chrysalis
- Songwriters: David Briggs; Beeb Birtles; Fun Lovin' Criminals
- Producer: Fun Lovin' Criminals

Fun Lovin' Criminals singles chronology
"Couldn't Get It Right" (1999)	"Loco" (2001)	"Bump" / "Run Daddy Run" (2001)

Music video
- "Loco" on YouTube

"Loco" is a song by American rock band Fun Lovin' Criminals, released as the first single from their third studio album, Loco (2001). It samples the song "Happy Anniversary" by Australian rock group Little River Band, so writing credits are given to band members David Briggs and Beeb Birtles. Fun Lovin' Criminals provided addition writing to the track and also produced it.

A song with Latin influences, "Loco" was issued as a single on February 5, 2001. It became the group's highest-charting single in the United Kingdom due to its use in a television advertisement for Miller beer, peaking at number five on the UK Singles Chart. It also garnered chart success in Ireland, Italy, the Netherlands, New Zealand, and Portugal.

== Background ==
During an interview with Jon Kutner, Fun Lovin' Criminals frontman Huey Morgan said that he wanted to create a track that sounded like a song Mexican-American guitarist Carlos Santana would compose. He felt connected to him because of their Latino heritage, and he explained that he did not want to copy Santana's style exactly, but rather to put some of his "flavor" into the song. He listened to the 1970 Santana album Abraxas for ideas, and he settled on sampling "Happy Anniversary" by Australian rock music group Little River Band for "Loco". Morgan achieved the guitar's sound by playing a 1959 Les Paul Junior with a Tech 21 device going through a Fender Pro amplifier.

== Critical reception ==
Reviewing the parent album for web magazine CLUAS, Frank McNally called the song a "beautifully crafted tune" and compared it to British band Freak Power's hit single, "Turn On, Tune In, Cop Out" (1993). He went on to say that the song "reeks of good times and is filled with schmoozy summertime grooves..." Nathan Foster of Classic Rock History ranked the song as the band's fourth-best single.

== Release and promotion ==
"Loco" was issued in the United Kingdom on February 5, 2001, as a CD and cassette single. The song and band appeared in a television advertisement for Miller beer shortly before its release, and this exposure allowed the song to become Fun Lovin' Criminals' highest-charting single in the United Kingdom when it debuted and peaked at number five on the UK Singles Chart on February 11. It spent six weeks within the UK top 100 and remains their last UK top-40 hit as of 2026. Its UK success impacted the Eurochart Hot 100 on the issue of February 24, when it appeared at its peak of number 24. The song also found limited European success, reaching number 22 in Ireland, number 26 in Italy, and number 85 in the Netherlands. In Portugal, it became a top-10 hit when it peaked at number eight in March. Although it entered the top 50 in New Zealand, reaching number 49 in April 2001, it did not chart within the top 100 in Australia.

== Track listings ==
UK and European CD1

1. "Loco" (Latin Quarter version)
2. "Everything Under the Stars"
3. "Special Dedication" (from "Maui Homicide 2000")
4. "Loco" (enhanced CD-ROM video)

UK and European CD2

1. "Loco" (album version)
2. "Loco" (Latin Quarter instrumental)
3. "Kill the Bad Guy" (from "Maui Homicide 2000")

UK and European maxi-cassette single

1. "Loco" (Latin Quarter version)
2. "Everything Under the Stars"
3. "Special Dedication" (from "Maui Homicide 2000")

== Credits and personnel ==
Credits are taken from the UK and European CD1 liner notes.

Studios

- Recorded at The Magic Shop (New York City)
- Mastered at Sterling Sound (New York City)

Personnel

- Fun Lovin' Criminals – writing, vocals, production, arrangement
- Xiomara Laugart – background vocals
- Descemer Bueno – background vocals
- Mackie – drums, percussion
- Tim Latham – recording, mixing
- Juan Garcia – recording assistance
- George Marino – mastering
- Gerb – art dissection
- Skills – video photography

== Charts ==
Chart (2001)	Peak position
Europe (Eurochart Hot 100)	24
Ireland (IRMA)	22
Italy (FIMI)	26
Netherlands (Single Top 100)	85
New Zealand (Recorded Music NZ)	49
Portugal (AFP)	8
Scottish Singles Sales (Official Charts)	5
UK Singles (Official Charts)	5
