= Korean Bodega =

Single by Fun Lovin' Criminals

Single by Fun Lovin' Criminals

from the album 100% Colombian
- Released: April 26, 1999
- Recorded: 1998
- Genre: Alternative hip hop; rap rock; alternative rock; trip hop; electronica; blues
- Length: 2:47
- Label: Chrysalis
- Songwriter: Fun Lovin' Criminals
- Producers: Fun Lovin' Criminals; Tim Latham (additional production)

Fun Lovin' Criminals singles chronology
"Big Night Out" (1998)	"Korean Bodega" (1999)	"Couldn't Get It Right" (2001)

Music video
- "Korean Bodega" on YouTube

"Korean Bodega" is a single released in 1999, and was the final single taken from Fun Lovin' Criminals's second album 100% Colombian.

The release of the single was cross-promoted by an electronica version of the song arranged by Garbage, on which singer Shirley Manson performed a guest vocal for the refrain. The new version was part of a remix trade between both bands, where Fun Lovin' Criminals remixed Garbage's single "You Look So Fine" in reciprocation.

== Single release ==
"Korean Bodega" was released by Chrysalis Records on April 26, 1999, and was heavily promoted Garbage's remix, and the fact that Shirley Manson had contributed vocals to the remix. Released on two CD singles and cassette single, the Garbage remix featured on two of the formats, while the original album version on one. It charted at #15 on the UK Singles chart, the most successful single the band had released since "Scooby Snacks" three years earlier.

In the run up the release of Garbage's "You Look So Fine" single on May 24, Mushroom Records released promotional CDs to radio stations featuring both a radio edit of "You Look So Fine" and the reworked Fun Lovin' Criminals version. Much of the print ads for "Korean Bodega" pointed out that "You Look So Fine" and the Fun Lovin Criminals remix would be released the next month, and details of Garbage's single was sent out to fans on both artists mailing lists.

== Personnel ==
- Huey Morgan – vocals, guitar
- Brian Leiser – bass
- Steve Borgovini – drums

== Track listings ==
- UK Cassette single Chrysalis
1. "Korean Bodega"
2. "Korean Bodega – Aero Mexicana Mix"
- UK CD1 Chrysalis 7243 8 86985 0 4 CDCHSS 5108
1. "Korean Bodega – Aero Mexicana Mix"
2. "The Fun Lovin' Criminal"
3. "Big Night Out"
4. "Big Night Out" (Enhanced Video)
- UK CD2 Chrysalis 7243 8 86985 2 8 CDCHS 5108
1. "Korean Bodega"
2. "The Ballad Of Larry Davis"
3. "Sleepyhead"
- UK CD Promo Chrysalis CDCHSDJ 5108
1. "Korean Bodega (Clean Album Version)"
2. "Korean Bodega (Aero Mexicana Mix – Clean)"
- US CD Promo Virgin 7087 6 13669 2 1, DPRO-13669
1. "Korean Bodega (Clean Version)"
2. "Korean Bodega (LP Version)"
3. "Call Out Hook"

== Release history ==
Release date	Territory	Record Label	Format
January 18, 1999	United States	Capitol	Airplay
April 26, 1999	United Kingdom	Chrysalis Records	2×CD single set, cassette single

== Comprehensive charts ==
Chart (1999)	Peak position
Scottish Singles chart	11
UK Singles Chart	15
