= Fun Lovin' Criminals =

American rock band

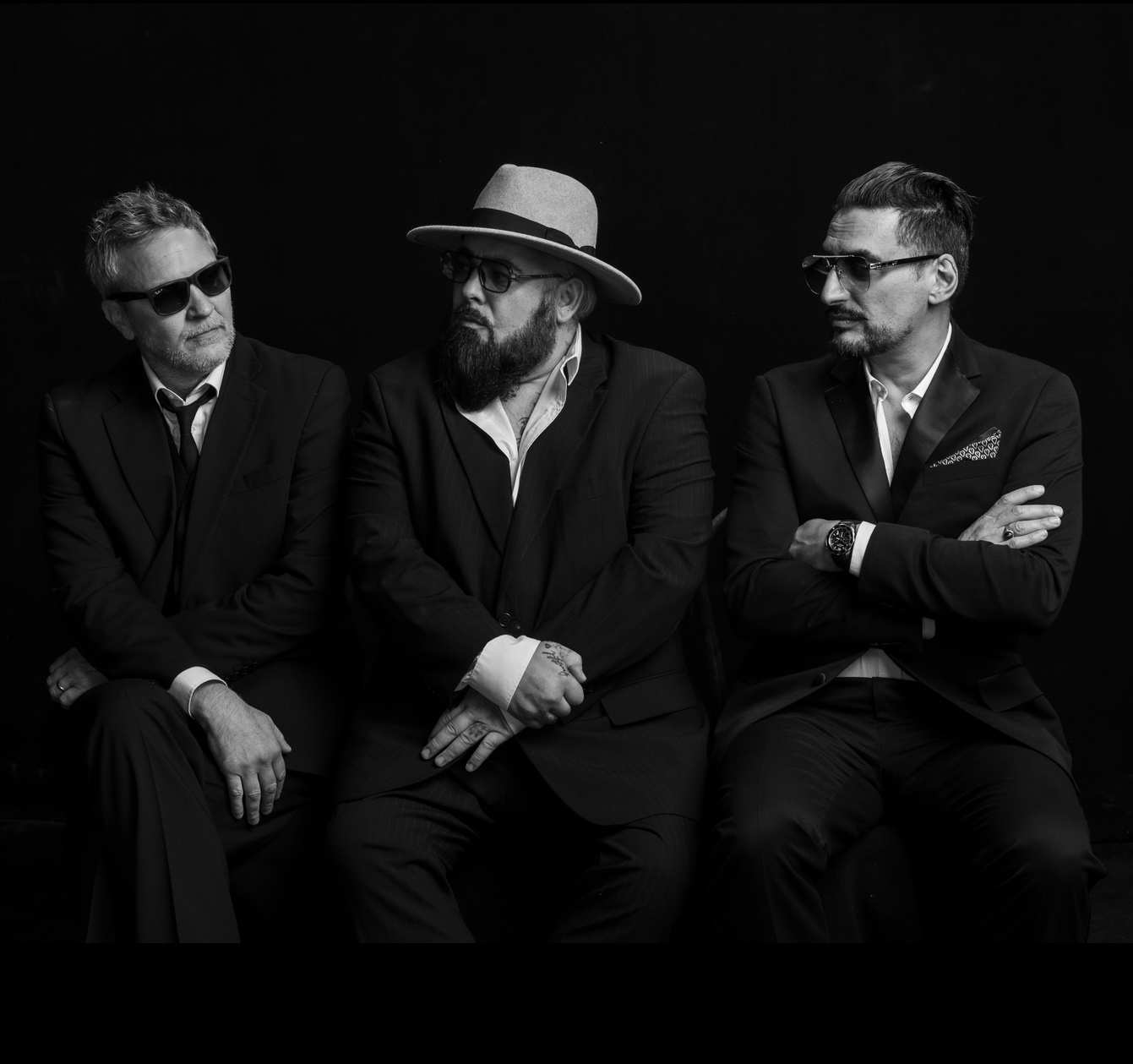
- Fun Lovin' Criminals in 2024

Background information
- Origin: New York City, U.S.
- Genres: Alternative rock; rap rock; hip-hop; funk rock
- Years active: 1993–present
- Labels: Silver Spotlight; EMI USA; Chrysalis; Virgin; Capitol; DiFontaine; Sanctuary
- Members: Brian 'Fast' Leiser; Frank Benbini; Naim Cortazzi
- Past members: Huey Morgan; Steve Borgovini; Maxwell Jayson
- Website: www.funlovincriminals.co

Fun Lovin' Criminals are an American rock band from New York City. They are best known for their hit "Scooby Snacks", which features samples from films by Quentin Tarantino, and the song "Love Unlimited", named after Barry White's backing vocal group. Their songs often focus on life in New York City, as well as urban life in general. Their lyrics can be gritty or existentialist in nature, touching on topics such as organized crime and urban violence, but they are just as often humorous or satirical. The band gained a large following internationally, particularly in Northwest Europe, around the release of their first two albums in the late 1990s.

== History ==
=== Formation and first albums: 1993–1999 ===
The band was formed in 1993 by Huey Morgan, Brian "Fast" Leiser, and Steve Borgovini after Leiser, who was already friends with Borgovini, met Morgan at the club where they both worked. They began playing together and would provide entertainment for the club when a booked act failed to show up. It was during one of these stand-in gigs that they caught the attention of EMI, who offered them a record deal.

Come Find Yourself, the band's first album, was released in the summer of 1996 by Chrysalis Records and followed their single "The Grave and the Constant" (UK No. 72), which had been released a month earlier, into the UK charts. The album also featured the UK Top 40 hits "Scooby Snacks" (UK No. 22), "The Fun Lovin' Criminal" (UK No. 26), and "King of New York" (UK No. 28). The latter's subject matter touched on the imprisonment of Italian-American mafioso John Gotti, the wannabe gangsters emulating his style, and his fans and followers in his community who maintained his innocence. The biggest hit, "Scooby Snacks", features samples from films by Quentin Tarantino and a guitar sample from Tones on Tail's song "Movement of Fear", interspersed with rap verses and a sung, anthemic chorus. Come Find Yourself had a slow rise on the UK Albums Chart, eventually peaking at No. 7 and spending well over a year on the chart, but it failed to make an impact in the US, despite the band appearing as musical guests on MTV's The Jenny McCarthy Show. The success of the album prompted the re-release of "Scooby Snacks" as a single, alongside a cover of the 10cc classic "I'm Not in Love", which this time reached UK No. 12.

100% Colombian, released in August 1998 by Virgin Records, featured a far grittier sound, tempered by three upbeat songs and several downtempo tracks, including "Love Unlimited", a tribute to Barry White. "Korean Bodega", one of the aforementioned upbeat songs, was the biggest hit from the album, reaching No. 15, their second-highest charting single to date, after the re-release of "Scooby Snacks".

In June 1999, the band performed at the Glastonbury Festival on the Pyramid Stage. Their December 1999 album, Mimosa, released by EMI, was a compilation album consisting mostly of laid-back lounge-style covers and different versions of earlier released tracks. While it made reasonable sales, the album was their weakest-selling to date and remained so for several years. It was around this time, in 1999, that Steve Borgovini left the band. He was replaced by Maxwell "Mackie" Jayson. A permanent replacement was found in 2003 in the form of Mark Reid (a.k.a. Frank Benbini) from Leicester, United Kingdom, who had previously worked with the band as Jayson's technician.

=== Mainstream success: 2000–2008 ===
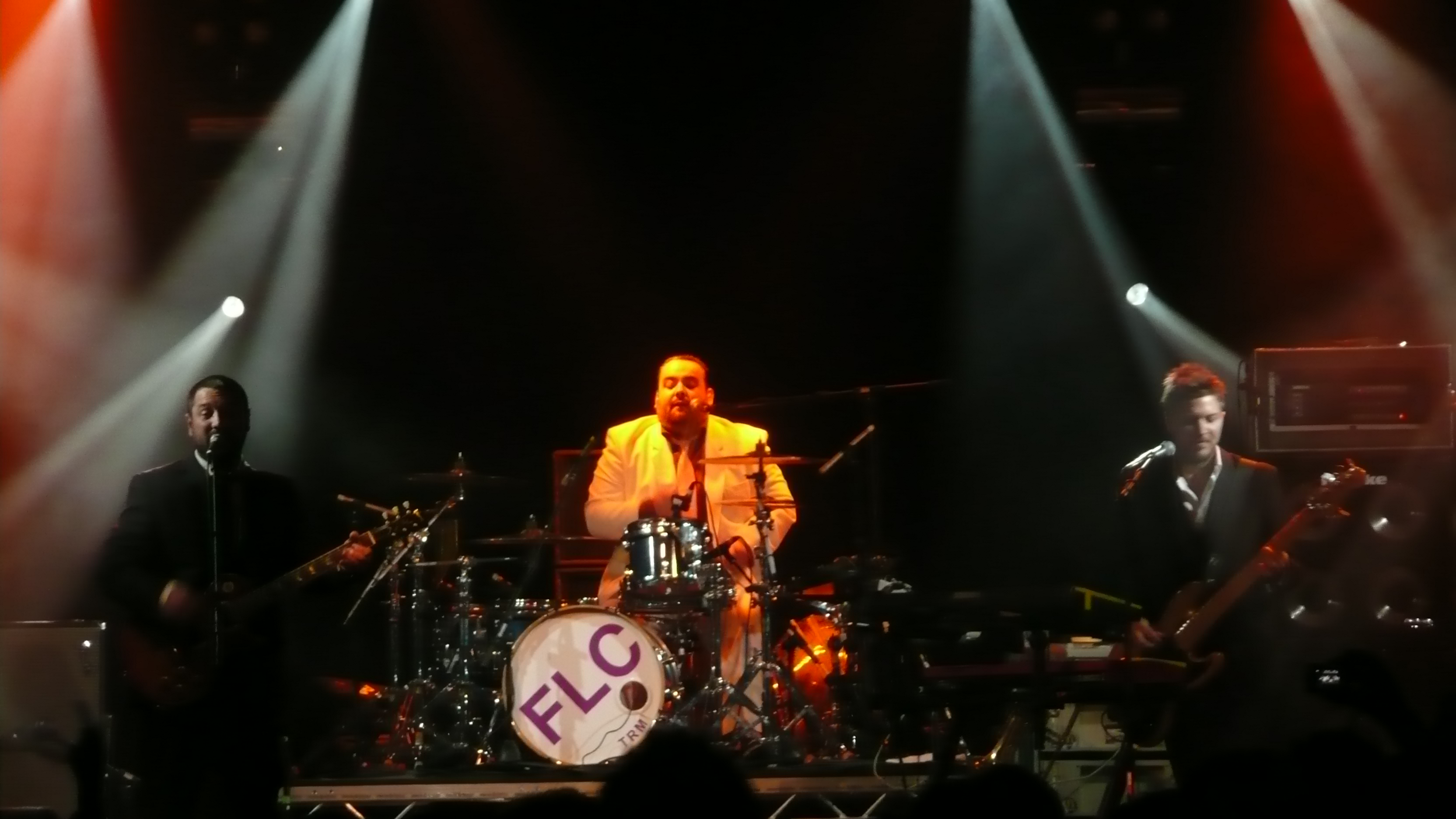
The band performing in 2008

The band's third studio album, Loco, was released in early 2001. Back under EMI, the album featured all new songs, including the eponymous single, which became their biggest hit yet, reaching No. 5 on the UK Singles Chart. It was the only single from the album to reach the UK Top 40, and its success helped Loco reach No. 5 on the UK Albums Chart.

Their final album under EMI was a "best of" compilation called Bag of Hits, released in 2002. It was issued in both one- and two-disc versions, with the second disc featuring remixes of Fun Lovin' Criminals songs by other artists. EMI released this album against the wishes of the band, who were not happy with the two-disc version. However, despite their objections, it reached No. 11 on the UK Albums Chart.

After parting ways with EMI, the band signed with Sanctuary Records in the UK, under which they released their fourth studio album, Welcome to Poppy's (2003). While the album received strong, though not outstanding, music reviews, it failed to match the commercial success of any of their previous albums, peaking at No. 20 on the UK Albums Chart. The best-selling single from the album reached No. 61.

EMI continued to release the band's back catalog, as well as unreleased songs, on two more albums. The Fun Lovin' Criminals made no further releases until their 2005 album, Livin' in the City, still under Sanctuary Records. This album was considered a love letter to New York, with many songs extolling the virtues of the city.

In June 2008, they made their second appearance at the Glastonbury Festival, this time on the Jazz World Stage.

=== Releases, touring & Huey Morgan's departure: 2009–2021 ===
In April 2010, Classic Fantastic was released, kicking off a European tour that began in Manchester. Legal wranglings with their previous manager meant that this album was their first official output in five years, although they had played live during this period. Leiser and Benbini had produced much of the album in London, while Morgan recorded his parts in New York.

Classic Fantastic was the first album released on Kilohertz, the band's own label, and signaled a new business model for the Fun Lovin' Criminals, focusing on touring their live shows rather than relying solely on record sales. Singles from the album included the title track "Classic Fantastic," followed by "Mr Sun." The official video for "Mr Sun" was canceled due to volcanic ash, and a montage of old home movies was used in its place.

The third single was a double A-side: "We The Three" and "Keep On Yellin," featuring South London's Roots Manuva, released on August 16, 2010. In July 2010, the band recorded a special series of songs with Roots Manuva. The project, dubbed "Criminal Manuvas," was recorded at Maida Vale studios for BBC Radio 6 Music; songs included a reggae version of "Scooby Snacks" and an alternative version of "Witness."

In September 2010, while touring, the band announced a live album: Fun, Live and Criminal via Pledge Music.

In March 2014, they released The Bong Remains The Same, a live concert video.

In February 2016, they released a deluxe, expanded edition of their debut album, "Come Find Yourself", to mark its 20th anniversary. The band toured the album by performing it in full alongside some of their other tracks throughout the UK and Europe, as well as at a number of festivals that summer and into 2017.

In January 2019, the band released the follow-up to their Mimosa compilation, titled Another Mimosa, which features covers of some of their favorite songs.

On 12 November 2021, their official Facebook page confirmed that Morgan had left the band. The announcement was made after the band had canceled their planned UK tour for October 2021. On 25 March 2022, in a live Instagram video between Leiser and Benbini, Leiser confirmed that relations between the band and Huey Morgan had become "strained," with Morgan deciding that he didn't want to tour with the band but instead continue presenting and DJing, which led to his decision to quit the band. Leiser told The Star in August 2022 that Morgan wouldn't play much of the band's back catalog live and that the band had "spent almost 10 years playing the same set to our fans," before revealing that "We got bored and some fans got bored too. It was one of the reasons cracks began to appear in our relationship." Leiser also revealed that he is now the group's lead singer and that Naim Cortazzi would be the band's new guitarist. Leiser then announced a tour for September 2022, as well as new material for a forthcoming album. Brian "Fast" Leiser is now the only founding member left in the group.

Morgan had not given any official statement regarding his departure, but in October 2023, he revealed that his former bandmates had blocked him on Twitter and stated that the band had "tried to pull a fast one" on fans by keeping his departure a secret, while promoting an upcoming Australian tour to celebrate the 25th anniversary of 100% Colombian. Morgan stated that his former bandmates were being "sad and creepy" and felt that they were "just a tribute act now." In an interview with NME in April 2024, Morgan revealed that he'd been informed by Alan McGee that the other band members had secretly trademarked the band name while Morgan was still in the band, one of the reasons Morgan is no longer a member.

=== New line-up and releases and activities: 2022–present ===
On 3 September 2022, a new song called "Shake It Loose" was given a debut play on Dean Jackson's show The Beat. The song comes from their Roosevelt Sessions EP, which was released digitally on 9 September 2022. The band toured the UK in September, with gigs in St Albans, Oxford, Leicester, London, Sheffield, Liverpool, and Birmingham and then toured Europe, including dates in Greece, the Netherlands, and Belgium before a tour of the US in November.

In autumn/winter 2023, with the 25th anniversary of the 100% Colombian album's release, the band toured Europe, playing 25 gigs in November and December of that year. Sixteen of these took place in the UK.

In February 2025, the band announced the release of their upcoming studio album A Matter of Time, due for release 29 August 2025, as well as a tour in September.

== Musical style ==
Rolling Stone described the music of Fun Lovin' Criminals as "a melting pot of local flavors: hip-hop, funk, blues and rock blended into a heavy, spliffy groove." BrumNotes magazine described the band's style as a fusion of hip-hop and blues rock. The Chicago Tribune called Fun Lovin' Criminals a "soul-infused rock ensemble". AllMusic's John Bush described the band's style as "a blend of hip-hop beats, alternative style, and bluesy rhythms". getHampshire called the band "the world’s finest and only purveyors of cinematic, hobo, hip-hop, rock ‘n’ roll, blues-jazz, soul-review vibes." The Independent described the band's style as a "blend of New York rock, funk, hip-hop and even punk". The Belfast Telegraph placed their style within the rap rock genre, while Bush categorized them as an alternative rock and hip-hop band.

== Side projects ==
Huey Morgan is a radio personality on the BBC. Morgan has appeared on Jack Osbourne's Adrenaline Junkie, a boy racer show Slips, sat in for Jonathan Ross and Dermot O'Leary on BBC Radio 2, appeared in Soulboy as a Dick Van Dyke-accented London record shop owner, voiced a character in the Scarface: The World Is Yours video game, and appeared with Liza Tarbuck on Liza & Huey's Pet Nation on prime-time Sky TV. Morgan now presents regular shows on BBC Radio 2 and BBC Radio 6 Music.

All three band members have released side projects. Benbini's band Uncle Frank has released an album, as has Leiser (Saudade (2019)), albeit with some of his previous unreleased work. Both Leiser and Benbini have collaborated on myriad remixes as well as a full remix album in a reggae-dub style under the moniker Radio Riddler. Morgan has released an album, Say It to My Face, and toured with several acquaintances, including Benbini, as Huey and the New Yorkers, raising money for veterans in the process.

== Members ==
=== Current members ===
- Brian ‘Fast’ Leiser - programming, sampling, keyboards, bass, horns, harmonica, backing vocals (1993–present), lead vocals (2021–present)
- Frank Benbini - drums, backing vocals (2003–present)
- Naim Cortazzi - guitar, backing vocals (2022–present)

=== Former members ===
- Huey Morgan - guitar, lead vocals (1993–2021)
- Steve Borgovini - drums (1993–1999)
- Maxwell Jayson - drums (1999–2003)

== Discography ==
Studio albums

- Come Find Yourself (1996)
- 100% Colombian (1998)
- Loco (2001)
- Welcome to Poppy's (2003)
- Livin' in the City (2005)
- Classic Fantastic (2010)
- A Matter of Time (2025)

Compilation albums

- Mimosa (1999)
- Bag of Hits (2002)
- Scooby Snacks: The Collection (2003)
- A's, B's and Rarities (2004)
- The Ultra Selection (2005)
- Essential (2012)
- Another Mimosa (2019)
