= Scooby Snacks (song) =

1996 single by Fun Lovin' Criminals

Single by Fun Lovin' Criminals

from the album Come Find Yourself
- Released: August 5, 1996
- Studio: Steve Rosenthals Magic Shop (New York City)
- Length: 3:02
- Label: Silver Spotlight; EMI; Chrysalis
- Songwriters: Fun Lovin' Criminals; Quentin Tarantino
- Producer: Fun Lovin' Criminals

Fun Lovin' Criminals singles chronology
"The Grave and the Constant" (1996)	"Scooby Snacks" (1996)	"The Fun Lovin' Criminal" (1996)

Music video
- "Scooby Snacks" on YouTube

"Scooby Snacks" is a song by American band Fun Lovin' Criminals from their debut album, Come Find Yourself (1996). The song was written by the band and contains several sampled quotes from Quentin Tarantino films, so Tarantino is also credited as a writer. Most of the song is rapped, with the exception of the chorus, which is sung. The "Scooby Snacks" in the song is a reference to diazepam, also known as Valium.

"Scooby Snacks" is the band's biggest hit single to date, reaching the top 40 in Australia, Iceland, Ireland, the Netherlands, and New Zealand. In the United Kingdom, the song originally peaked at number 22 in August 1996, but after being reissued with a cover of the 10cc song "I'm Not in Love", it reached a new peak of number 12 on the UK Singles Chart in June 1997. In 1996, it was voted number 14 on the list of the Hottest 100 songs of that year by listeners of Australia's Triple J radio station.

== Background ==
Instrumentalist Brian Leiser would practice sounds and samples in his Brooklyn apartment with movies playing in the background. He sampled the tremolo guitar sound from the 1984 song "Movement of Fear" by Tones on Tail, and was putting the song together while Pulp Fiction played on his TV, inspiring him to put its quotes in his song.

Leiser was working at a club called The Limelight, where he met bandmate Huey Morgan. The owner of the Limelight had another club called The Tunnel, known for its brawls at Sunday night events. In an effort to calm down clubgoers, one of the security guards would hand them valium capsules as they entered, calling them "Scooby snacks". Leiser said, "That’s where I got the idea for the chorus from: what if this dude and some of his meathead friends were robbing banks, all high on these scooby snacks?"

== Samples ==
The song contains samples from Quentin Tarantino's movies Pulp Fiction and Reservoir Dogs. Tarantino demanded 37% of the song's royalties and a co-writing credit, which he received.

== Chart performance ==
"Scooby Snacks" reached the top 40 in Australia, Iceland, the Netherlands and on the US Billboard Modern Rock Tracks chart. It reached the top 20 in New Zealand, peaking at number 18. The song initially peaked number 22 on the UK Singles Chart but was re-released as a double A-side with their cover of 10cc's "I'm Not in Love" on 23 June 1997, reaching a new peak of number 12 the following week. This version also reached number 27 in Ireland. In July 2022, the song was certified silver by the British Phonographic Industry (BPI) for sales and streams exceeding 200,000 units.

== Track listings ==
=== 1996 release ===
UK CD1

1. "Scooby Snacks" (album version) – 3:02
2. "Smoke 'Em" (live)
3. "Come Find Yourself" (live)
4. "I Can't Get with That" (live)

UK CD2

1. "Scooby Snacks" (album version—clean version) – 3:02
2. "Scooby Snacks" (Steve Lironi master mix) – 3:16
3. "Scooby Snacks" (20 Mg version) – 3:46
4. "Scooby Snacks" (Rockamental version) – 2:57

UK limited-edition 7-inch picture disc

A1. "Scooby Snacks" (album version—clean version) – 3:04
B1. "Scooby Snacks" (Steve Lironi instrumental with movie samples) – 3:13
B2. "I'll Be Seeing You" – 1:19

European CD single

1. "Scooby Snacks" (album version) – 3:02
2. "Blues for Suckers" – 3:50

Australian CD single

1. "Scooby Snacks" (album version)
2. "Scooby Snacks" (Steve Lironi master mix)
3. "Scooby Snacks" (20 Mg version)
4. "Scooby Snacks" (Rockamental version)
5. "Scooby Snacks" (Steve Lironi instrumental)
6. "I'll Be Seeing You"

=== 1997 release ===
UK CD1

1. "Scooby Snacks" (album version) – 3:04
2. "I'm Not in Love" – 4:36
3. "Scooby Snacks" (live at the Forum) – 3:15
4. "I Can't Get with That (live at the Forum) – 4:53

UK CD2

1. "I'm Not in Love" – 4:36
2. "Scooby Snacks (Schmoove version) – 3:25
3. "Bombin' the L (Circa 1956 version) – 2:29
4. "Coney Island Girl (Schmoove version) – 3:08

UK 7-inch single

A1. "I'm Not in Love" – 4:36
A2. "Scooby Snacks" (album version) – 3:04
B1. "Coney Island Girl" (Schmoove version) – 3:08

== Credits and personnel ==
Credits are lifted from the 1996 UK CD1 liner notes.

Studios

- Recorded at Steve Rosenthals Magic Shop (New York City)
- Pre-produced at Drunk Munk Studios (New York City)
- Mixed at Platinum Island (New York City)
- Mastered at Sterling Sound (New York City)

Personnel

- Fun Lovin' Criminals – writing, production, arrangement
- Quentin Tarantino – writing
- Tim Latham – recording, mixing
- Juan Garcia – recording assistant
- Ed Douglas – recording assistant
- Steve "Puffy" Coffey – mixing assistant
- George Marino – mastering
- Henry Marquez – art direction
- Morph Iconography – artwork layout and design
- Doctor Revolt – illustration

== Charts ==
=== Weekly charts ===
Chart (1996–1997)	Peak position
Australia (ARIA)	32
Iceland (Íslenski Listinn Topp 40)	3
Ireland (IRMA) 1997 reissue with "I'm Not in Love"	27
Netherlands (Dutch Top 40)	38
Netherlands (Single Top 100)	37
New Zealand (Recorded Music NZ)	18
Scottish Singles Sales (Official Charts)	24
Scottish Singles Sales (Official Charts) 1997 reissue with "I'm Not in Love"	8
UK Singles (Official Charts)	22
UK Singles (Official Charts) 1997 reissue with "I'm Not in Love"	12
US Radio Songs (Billboard)	73
US Alternative Airplay (Billboard)	14

=== Year-end charts ===
Chart (1996)	Position
Iceland (Íslenski Listinn Topp 40)	23
US Modern Rock Tracks (Billboard)	74

== Certifications ==
Region	Certification	Certified units/sales
United Kingdom (BPI)	Silver	200,000^{‡}
^{‡} Sales+streaming figures based on certification alone.

== Release history ==
Region	Date	Format(s)	Label(s)	Ref.
United Kingdom	August 5, 1996	7-inch vinyl; CD	Silver Spotlight; Chrysalis	
United States	November 5, 1996	Contemporary hit radio	EMI	
United Kingdom (re-release)	June 23, 1997	CD; cassette	Silver Spotlight; Chrysalis	
