= Tim Latham =

American recording engineer

Tim Latham (born November 18, 1966) is a Grammy Award-winning American recording engineer working in the music industry. Latham attended Berklee College of Music in the 1980s.

In 2008 Latham shared a Grammy Award for Best Musical Theater Album with Joel Moss for their work on the recording of the Broadway theatre production of In The Heights.

== Select Discography ==
- In The Heights (Grammy winner)
- Hamilton (Grammy winner)
- Black Eyed Peas
- Britney Spears (Multiple Platinum)
- Lou Reed
- Fun Lovin’ Criminals (Gold&Platinum)
- Yerba Buena (Grammy nominations)
- Erykah Badu (Multiple Grammy winner)
- A Tribe Called Quest (Gold)
- Orishas (Grammy nomination)
- Ratones Paranoicos
- Gym Class Heroes (Best New Artist, MTV)
- The Psychedelic Furs
- Cesária Évora
- Yuri Buenaventura
- Uncle Frank
- G. Love and Special Sauce
- Arrested Development
- De La Soul
- Alliance Ethnik - Gold
- Mobb Deep
