= Huey Morgan =

American musician (born 1968)

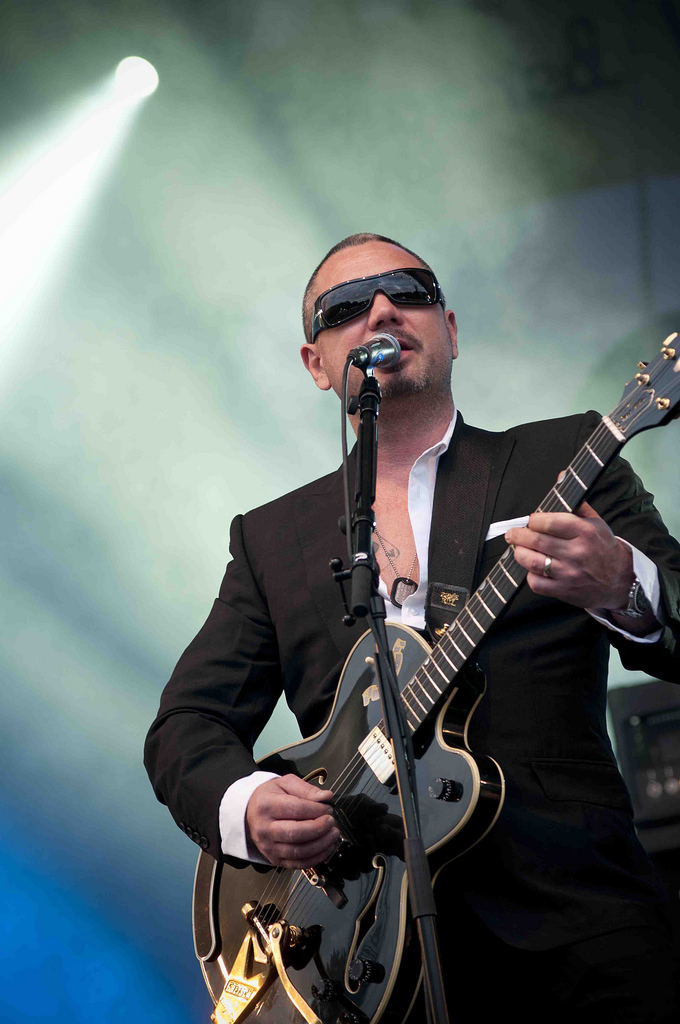
- Morgan with the Fun Lovin' Criminals at Tilburg, Netherlands, June 2011

Background information
- Also known as: Papa Large, Huey, Dangerous Huey Morgan
- Born: Hugh Thomas Diaz Morgan; 7 August 1968 (age 58); New York City, United States
- Genres: alternative rock, hip-hop, jazz, reggae, funk
- Occupations: Musician, songwriter, writer, television personality, radio DJ
- Instruments: Vocals, guitar
- Years active: 1993–present
- Website: www.hueymorgan.com

Hugh Thomas Diaz Morgan (born 7 August 1968) is an American musician and DJ best known as the former frontman of rock/hip hop band Fun Lovin' Criminals. Morgan performs both vocals and guitar and combines rock, hip hop, jazz, reggae, and funk influences in his music. He presents The Huey Show on Virgin Radio, having previously hosted on BBC Radio 6 Music for 17 years.

He has also made film and TV appearances.

== Early life ==
Morgan is an American, born to Puerto Rican-American and Irish-American parents. In his youth, he committed petty crimes and dealt cocaine, and he was arrested while driving a stolen car.

He had a choice between going to jail or joining the US Marines. He decided on the latter and has the Marines motto, Semper Fidelis (Latin for 'always loyal'), tattooed on his right arm. After being honourably discharged from the Marines he started DJing in New York City clubs. He met Brian "Fast" Leiser at the Limelight where they played at a birthday party and got scouted for EMI.

== Music career ==
In 1993, Morgan formed Fun Lovin' Criminals with Leiser and Steve Borgovini. During Morgan's tenure with the band, they released six studio albums, three of which made the top 10 in the UK Albums Chart, and scored eight top 40 hits in the UK Singles Chart. On 12 November 2021, it was announced that Morgan had left the Fun Lovin' Criminals.

In 2010, Morgan made a guest appearance in the music video of Plan B's single "Prayin'", and in 2012, he collaborated with JetTricks on the track "See Us Through" from their album Better Than Real Life. Also in 2012, Morgan released his début solo album, Say It to My Face, credited to Huey and the New Yorkers.

== Appearances in other media ==
=== Writing ===
Morgan had a short-lived, ghost-written wine column for the British magazine Mondo from 2000 to 2001.

In June 2015, Morgan released his first book, Rebel Heroes: The Renegades of Music & Why We Still Need Them.

In September 2025, Morgan released his autobiography, The Fun Lovin' Criminal.

=== Television ===
On television, Morgan has appeared on the UK comedy music quiz show Never Mind the Buzzcocks, three times as a guest panelist and once as a guest host. In his most famous appearance, Morgan smashed a mug after becoming upset when needing to repeat lyrics from his songs in the Next Lines round. Morgan also participated in the BBC's The Underdog Show, where eight celebrities trained and rehabilitated rescued dogs. He has also been a frequent guest panelist on the Channel 5 morning show The Wright Stuff. Morgan also made a guest appearance in an episode of Skins as Toxic Bob, the owner of a metal record shop. In 2010, Morgan co-hosted Liza & Huey's Pet Nation on Sky One with Liza Tarbuck. Morgan also hosted Slips on the British music channel Viva.

More recent work includes narration for National Geographic's series Drugs Inc, now in its third series, voice overs for TV ads such as Blink Box and more. In 2015, Morgan began work on the Sky Arts show Guitar Stars, working with fellow DJ Edith Bowman, but left after the first series. On 3 November 2016, he appeared as a panelist on the BBC political debate programme Question Time. In April 2018, Morgan appeared on Million Pound Holiday Club on Channel 4 with stunt driver Ben Collins racing cars in the countryside. In July 2020, Morgan hosted a series for BBC Four titled Huey Morgan's Latin Music Adventure, which saw Morgan travel to Brazil, Cuba and Puerto Rico, meeting famous musicians who shaped and inspired the sounds of Latin music.

=== Film ===
Morgan starred in Clubbing to Death with Craig Charles, Nick Moran, Dave Courtney, and Deepak Verma. He also played record shop proprietor Dee Dee in Soulboy, a dramatisation of the 1970s Northern Soul scene starring Martin Compston, Felicity Jones and Alfie Allen. He starred in the 2000 film Once in the Life with Laurence Fishburne, playing the character Carlos. He played The Yank in the 2003 film Headrush.

=== Voice-over ===
Morgan did a voice-over for the video game Scarface: The World Is Yours. He is the voice of National Geographic TV shows Drugs Inc and Underworld Inc as well as narrating the two-part BBC television documentary Blues America in 2013, which can be seen on YouTube. He has voiced radio ads for Wagamama since 2015, and in 2016, he voiced a global advertising campaign for Lynx deodorant.

=== Radio ===
On 5 October 2008, Morgan began hosting The Huey Show on BBC Radio 6 Music. The show won a Bronze Award at the 2009 Sony Radio Academy Awards. The show was broadcast from 10 am to 1 pm on Saturdays. His final show was on 27 December 2025, before his move to Virgin Radio. In an interview with The Sunday Times, he cited a desire to balance family commitments and concerns over his career development as reasons for leaving 6Music.

Since April 2011, Morgan has hosted an array of shows on BBC Radio 2, beginning with Saturday 12:00 am - 3:00 am, replacing the show's previous host Mark Lamarr. He presented from 4 am to 6 am on Saturdays until 24 April 2021.

== Other business ventures ==
Morgan previously co-owned The Voodoo Lounge, The Dice Bar and DiFontaine's Pizza Place in Dublin. Morgan also opened Notting Hill Tattoo Studio, Love Hate Social Club with New York tattoo artist Ami James in November 2012.

== Personal life ==
Morgan has previously lived in New York City, Dublin, Hawaii, London, and Frome in Somerset. He now lives in Bath, Somerset. He married his wife Rebecca in 2007; they have a son and a daughter.
