= The Second Time Around (1960 song) =

1960 song by Jimmy Van Heusen and Sammy Cahn

Single by Bing Crosby
- A-side: "Incurably Romantic"
- Released: September 1960
- Recorded: August 25, 1960
- Genre: Traditional pop
- Length: 3:12
- Label: MGM
- Composer: Jimmy Van Heusen
- Lyricist: Sammy Cahn

"The Second Time Around" is a song with words by Sammy Cahn and music by Jimmy Van Heusen. It was introduced in the 1960 film High Time, sung by Bing Crosby with Henry Mancini conducting his orchestra, and was nominated for the Academy Award for Best Original Song. It lost out to "Never on Sunday".

Its theme is captured by its first two lines:

Love is lovelier the second time around,
Just as wonderful with both feet on the ground.

Although Crosby recorded it on August 25, 1960, for MGM Records, it is especially associated with Frank Sinatra, who recorded it for Reprise Records on December 21, 1960. This achieved some chart success reaching the #50 position in the Billboard Hot 100 chart. Sinatra also recorded it again for Reprise on November 5, 1961, and April 29, 1963.

== Recorded versions ==
- Basin Street East Proudly Presents Miss Peggy Lee, Peggy Lee, 1961
- Let's Face the Music, Shirley Bassey, 1962
- This Time It's Love, The Hi-Lo's, 1962
- You're Mine You, Sarah Vaughan, 1962
- Moon River and Other Great Movie Themes, Andy Williams, 1962
- Love Letters, Julie London, 1962
- Ahmad Jamal at the Blackhawk, Ahmad Jamal, 1962
- Hollywood – My Way, Nancy Wilson, 1963
- Make Mine Swedish Style, Monica Zetterlund & Bill McGuffie Quartet, 1964
- More 4 Freshmen and 5 Trombones, The Four Freshmen, 1964
- Ellington '65, Duke Ellington, 1965
- Loads of Love, Shirley Horn, 1965
- Shirley Bassey at the Pigalle, Shirley Bassey, 1965
- That's All, Mel Tormé, 1965
- The Movie Song Album, Tony Bennett, 1966
- The Dealer, Chico Hamilton, 1966
- Woman to Woman, Cleo Laine,1967
- Grandes Exitos del Cine de los Años 60, Connie Francis, 1967
- Dusty... Definitely, Dusty Springfield, 1968
- Quintessence, Bill Evans, 1976
- It Only Happens Every Time, Monica Zetterlund & The Thad Jones / Mel Lewis Orchestra, 1977
- Rosemary Clooney Sings the Music of Jimmy Van Heusen, Rosemary Clooney, 1986
- Kiri Sidetracks: The Jazz Album, Dame Kiri Te Kanawa performed this with André Previn, 1992.
- Pop Pop, Rickie Lee Jones, 1993
- Manilow Sings Sinatra, Barry Manilow, 1998
- Romance on Film, Romance on Broadway, Michael Feinstein, 2000
- The Movie Album, Barbra Streisand, 2003
- Bolton Swings Sinatra: The Second Time Around, Michael Bolton, 2006
- Ballads from the Midnight Hotel, Todd Gordon (2007)
- Late in Life, Sue Raney, 2015

=== Frank Sinatra albums ===
- Sinatra's Sinatra, 1963
- A Man and His Music, 1965
- Sinatra & Sextet: Live in Paris, 1994, recorded 1962

== Other pop culture appearances ==
- Jane Morgan sang the song on a 1961 episode of The Jack Benny Program.
