= La Mujer =

Studio album by Shirley Bassey
- Released: 6 June 1989
- Recorded: 1988
- Genre: MOR Spanish
- Label: Mercury PolyGram
- Producer: Leonardo Schultz

Shirley Bassey chronology
I Am What I Am (1984)	La Mujer (1989)	Keep the Music Playing (1991)

La Mujer Shirley Bassey canta en Español (The Woman - Shirley Bassey sings in Spanish), is a Shirley Bassey studio album recorded in Spanish. The first recording sessions were held in Spain, and the album was completed in California, at the Hitsville West studio in December 1988. The 1980s saw a period of very few album releases from Shirley Bassey: All by Myself (1982); the acclaimed album I Am What I Am (1984); her recording of James Bond themes from 1987, The Bond Collection, (which had met with problems and remained unreleased until 1992); and La Mujer. In 1987 the Swiss electronica band Yello approached Shirley Bassey about recording a song with them. The track "The Rhythm Divine" was a minor hit in the UK, charting at number 54 in the UK singles chart but achieving more success on mainland Europe. The success of the single released by Mercury Records, led to an album deal on the label.

This is the second album of non-English recordings made by Shirley Bassey, the late 1960s and early 1970s had seen her record several tracks in Italian. As preparation for the recording Shirley had twenty hours of Spanish lessons. The album brings together new Spanish material and new versions in Spanish of such Shirley Bassey classics as "Without You" ("Sin Ti") and "I (Who Have Nothing)" ("Hoy No Tengo Nada"). Spanish lyrics were provided by Leonardo Schultz, who also wrote the new material appearing on the album. The album's debut was a performance by Bassey at the "Viña Del Mar Song Festival" in Chile in February, 1989, and further appearances in South America followed. The performance in Chile was filmed and an edited version featured on a CD/DVD release in 2004, the set called Super Estellas del Amor features five tracks on CD from the album and seven live performances on DVD. This release also includes performances from Matt Monro and Demis Roussos that were also recorded in Spanish and produced by Leonardo Schultz.

The album was mainly marketed for the Spanish speaking countries in South America, the US and mainland Europe, very little promotion was undertaken in the UK for this release. The original releases for La Mujer in Germany and the US (on LP, cassette and CD) featured the same artwork as its South American counterpart, but differing layouts.

== Track listing ==
1. "La Pasion Que Nos Devora" (Leonardo Schultz, Danny Schultz) -4.56
2. "Sin Ti (Without You)" (Tom Evans, Pete Ham) (Spanish: Leonardo Schultz) -3.27
3. "Volveras" (Leonardo Schultz, Miguel Muscarsel) -4.36
4. "No Me Hables Mas De Amor" (Raúl Abramzon, Leonardo Schultz) -4.18
5. "Nadie Mas Te Quiso (Como Yo) (I Could Never Miss You (More Than I Do))" (Neil Harrison) (Spanish: Leonardo Schultz) - 3.32
6. "Asi Sola Yo (Out Here On My Own)" (Michael Gore, Lesley Gore) (Spanish: Leonardo Schultz) -4.14
7. "No Fingire" (Leonardo Schultz, Danny Schultz) -4.14
8. "Hoy No Tengo Nada (I (Who Have Nothing))" (Mogol, Donida, Jerry Leiber, Mike Stoller) (Spanish: Leonardo Schultz) -3.06
9. "Vallas (Rivals)" (Barbara Dickson, Charlie Dore) (Spanish: Danny Schultz) -4.30
10. "Si Yo Te Quiero Mas" (Leonardo Schultz, Danny Schultz) -5.00

== Singles ==
One single with the title Shirley Bassey canta en Español was issued from this album.

Track listing US 7" single "Shirley Bassey canta en Español"

A: "Sin Ti (Without You)" (Tom Evans, Pete Ham) (Spanish: Leonardo Schultz) -3.27

B: "Hoy No Tengo Nada (I (Who Have Nothing))" (Mogol, Donida, Jerry Leiber, Mike Stoller) (Spanish: Leonardo Schultz) -3.06

Issued on the Mercury Records label with the catalogue number Mercury 4127, this single did not chart.

== Personnel ==
- Gary H.Mason - Executive Producer/Production Coordinator
- Shirley Bassey - Vocals
- Ken Wild - Bass
- The Petsye Powell Singers - Chorus
- Chad Wackerman, Jorge Patrono, Ralph Humphrey - Drums
- Fred Selden - Flute, Saxophone
- James Thatcher - French Horn
- George Doering, John L. Goux - Guitar
- Amy Shulman - Harp
- Gene Cipnano - Oboe
- Jorge Bermudez, Steve Foreman - Percussion
- Brian Gasgoign, Emilio Kauderer, Nelson Kole - Piano, Synthesizer
- The Manchester Strings - Strings
- Charles C. Loper, Ernest Carlson, Lew McGreary - Trombone
- John Rosenberg, Robert R. O'Donnell, Stuart Blumberg - Trumpet
