= I Owe It All to You (album) =

Studio album by Shirley Bassey
- Released: 6 November 2020
- Label: Decca
- Producer: Nick Patrick

Shirley Bassey chronology
Hello Like Before (2014)	I Owe It All to You (2020)

I Owe It All to You is an album by Welsh singer Shirley Bassey, released on 6 November 2020 by Decca Records. It contains a mix of new songs and cover versions "handpicked to reflect her incredible life and career". Bassey said of the album, "My new album is a celebration of 70 years in showbiz. 70 years of support from my fans and 70 years of music! I've trodden the boards of many stages and kicked up many a diamante heel! The songs I have chosen all feel very personal and connected to my life. I hope they will do the same for my fans."

"Look But Don’t Touch" and the title track "I Owe It All to You" are the album's original compositions. Prior to this studio version, "You Ain't Heard Nothing Yet" was only available on the video Live – You Ain't Heard Nothing Yet (1986). Bassey previously recorded "Who Wants to Live Forever" for her 1995 Sings the Movies album.

I Owe It All to You entered the Top 5 of the UK Albums Chart, making Bassey "the first female artist to claim a Top 40 album in seven consecutive decades."

== Track listing ==
No.	Title	Writer(s)	Length
1.	"Overture"	Steve Sidwell
2.	"Who Wants to Live Forever"	Brian May
3.	"I Owe It All to You"	Jack McManus; Don Black
4.	"Almost Like Being in Love"	Frederick Loewe; Alan Jay Lerner
5.	"Maybe This Time"	John Kander; Fred Ebb
6.	"I Made It Through the Rain"	Gerard Kenny; Bruce Sussman; Jack Feldman; Drey Shepperd; Barry Manilow
7.	"Adagio"	Remo Giazotto; Tomaso Albinoni
8.	"Look But Don't Touch"	Eliot John Kennedy; James Marcus Jayawardena; David Ryan Corbell
9.	"Smile"	Charlie Chaplin; John Turner; Geoffrey Parsons
10.	"You Ain't Heard Nothing Yet"	Michael Alexander
11.	"I Don't Know What Love Is"	Stefani Germanotta; Lukas Nelson
12.	"Always on My Mind"	Wayne Carson; Mark James; Johnny Christopher
13.	"I Was Here"	Diane Warren
14.	"Music"	John Miles

== Personnel ==
Adapted from the album's liner notes.

=== Musicians ===
- Shirley Bassey – vocals
- Don Richardson – bass guitar
- Ian Thomas – drums
- John Parricelli – guitar
- Rob Mounsey – piano, orchestral arranger
- Dominic Ferris – piano, rehearsal pianist and music preparation
- Toby Chapman – keyboards, background vocals (tracks 2 & 8), programming
- Michael Alexander – conductor, musical director
- Mikel Toms – orchestra contractor
- Czech Studio Orchestra – orchestra
- Ade Halloween, Alistair White, Andy Wood, Chris Dean – trombones
- Dave Bishop, Graeme Blevins, Howard McGill, Jamie Talbot, Martin Williams – saxophones
- Louis Dowdeswell, Paul Spong, Ryan Quigley, Simon Gardener – trumpets
- Andy Caine, Gabriella Bishop, Gina Foster – background vocals (tracks 2 & 8)

=== Production ===
- Produced by Nick Patrick
- Executive producer: Jenny Meredith
- Engineered by Michal Petrasek & Pavel Ridosko
- Mix engineer: Pete Schwier
- Mastering engineer: Tony Cousins
- Recorded at Arts & Music Studios, Italy; Czech Television Studios, Czech Republic; Master Chord Studios, UK
- Mixed at Shine Studio, UK
- Mastered at Metropolis Mastering, UK
- A&R coordination: Karyn Hughes, Alex O'Hara
- Marketing: Murray Rose
- Product co-ordinator: Nico Rooney
- Photography by Matt Hollyoak
- Styling by Cheryl Konteh
- Hair & make up by Nikki Hambi

== Charts ==
Chart performance for I Owe It All to You
Chart (2020)	Peak position
Belgian Albums (Ultratop Flanders)	187
German Albums (Offizielle Top 100)	84
Scottish Albums (OCC)	6
UK Albums (OCC)	5
