= Applause Records =

American record label

- Founded: 1981
- Founder: Arthur Mogull
- Defunct: 1983
- Status: Defunct
- Genre: Traditional pop, vocal
- Country of origin: U.S.
- Location: Beverly Hills, California

Applause Records was a short-lived record label featuring popular standards performers, nearly all of them vocalists. It was founded in Beverly Hills, California, in 1981 by record company executive and music publisher Arthur Mogull. The label released albums by Shirley Bassey, Steve Lawrence, Eydie Gorme, Sammy Davis Jr., Robert Goulet, Vic Damone, Jack Jones, Tony Martin, The Lettermen and Peter Nero. In December 1981 Peggy Lee said she was considering joining the label, although she never did.

A 1988 newspaper story gave Steve Lawrence credit for founding Applause Records, saying he did so "out of acute frustration."

In 1990 the Lewis Horowitz Company, which provided funding for the label, foreclosed on it and was assigned the catalog. Horowitz sold the catalog to William Brown Associates in 1997; that company was acquired by Reach Entertainment in 1999.

Artists on the Applause label included the Stardust Dance Band, The Skruffy Group, Norwood, and Joe Cano. In addition, the Boomin' Reunion series includes new recordings of their original hits from Chuck Jackson, Ernie K Doe, Jean Knight, Frankie Ford, Mel Carter, Lou Christie, Len Barry, Donnie Brooks, Merrilee Rush, Jewel Akens, Al Wilson, Bobby 'Boris' Pickett, Lenny Welch, Bruce Belland (Four Preps), Jim Yester (Association), J J Jackson, Ian Whitcomb, Mark Lindsay, Mitch Rider, Pete Rivera (Rare Earth), The Cufflinks, Spencer Davis, Chris Montez, John Gummoe (Cascades), and Brian Hyland.

== Selected album discography ==
- 1001 Steve Lawrence, Take It On Home (June 1, 1981)
- 1002 Eydie Gormé, Since I Fell for You (June 1, 1981)
- 1003 Tony Martin, I'll See You in My Dreams (January 11, 1982)
- 1004 Buddy Greco & Visions, Hot Nights (January 11, 1982)
- 1005 Shirley Bassey, All by Myself (January 11, 1982)
- 1006 The Lettermen, Love Is... (January 11, 1982)
- 1007 Jack Jones, Jack Jones, (January 11, 1982)
- 1008 Julius Wechter & the Baja Marimba Band, Naturally (January 11, 1982)
- 1011 Robert Goulet, Close to You (January 11, 1982)
- 1016 Sammy Davis Jr., Closest of Friends (January 11, 1982)
- 1020 Chris Connor, Chris Connor Live (1983)

== Sources ==
- Record at California Secretary of State
- Interview with Peggy Lee which discusses the label

== See also ==
- List of record labels
