= Sings the Songs of Andrew Lloyd Webber =

Studio album by Shirley Bassey
- Released: 1993
- Recorded: 1993
- Genre: MOR
- Label: EMI MFP
- Producer: Gordon Lorenz

Shirley Bassey chronology
The Bond Collection (1992)	Sings the Songs of Andrew Lloyd Webber (1993)	Sings the Movies (1995)

Sings the Songs of Andrew Lloyd Webber is a studio album by Shirley Bassey, released in 1993.

This album saw Bassey briefly return to her old label EMI (which also owns her United Artists recordings); the album was issued by EMI on the Music For Pleasure Premier label. All songs on this album were composed by Andrew Lloyd Webber. This is the first, and to date, the only Songbook album that Bassey has recorded and released. In her early recording career she had recorded many songs from the Great American Songbook, but unlike Frank Sinatra, Ella Fitzgerald, and many other artists, she had never recorded a complete album of songs by only one composer. The songs on the album are all taken from the popular musicals of Andrew Lloyd Webber that he wrote with various lyricists. The oldest song found on the album is from the 1971 musical Jesus Christ Superstar, which originally opened on Broadway in October of that year. Bringing it up to date, the album also includes two songs from Sunset Boulevard, which had recently premiered on July 12, 1993, in London's West End.

Four songs had previously been recorded by Bassey: "I Don't Know How To Love Him" in 1972 for the album And I Love You So, "Don't Cry for Me Argentina" in 1978 for the album The Magic Is You, "Memory" in 1984 for the B-side of the European single "That's Right", and "All I Ask of You" in 1991 for the album Keep the Music Playing. Several TV performances and interviews were made by Bassey to promote this album. The album entered the UK Albums Chart on December 4, 1993, and peaked at No. 34.

== Track listing ==
1. "Memory" (Andrew Lloyd Webber, Trevor Nunn, based on work from T. S. Eliot) (from Cats) – 5.02
2. "Starlight Express" (Webber, Richard Stilgoe) (from Starlight Express) – 3.04
3. "All I Ask of You" (Webber, Charles Hart, Stilgoe) (from The Phantom of the Opera) – 4.05
4. "I Don't Know How to Love Him" (Webber, Tim Rice) (from Jesus Christ Superstar) – 4.15
5. "Macavity" (Webber, Trevor Nunn, based on work from T. S. Eliot) (from Cats) – 3.17
6. "Chanson D'Enfance" (Webber, Hart, Don Black) (from Aspects of Love) – 2.28
7. "With One Look" (Webber, Christopher Hampton, Black) (from Sunset Boulevard) – 3.44
8. "Tell Me on a Sunday" (Webber, Black) (from Song and Dance) – 3.33
9. "The Last Man in My Life" (Webber, Black) (from Song and Dance) – 3.38
10. "Don't Cry for Me Argentina" (Webber, Rice) (from Evita) – 5.13
11. "Wishing You Were Somehow Here Again" (Webber, Hart, Stilgoe)(from The Phantom of the Opera) – 3.25
12. "As If We Never Said Goodbye" (Webber, Hampton, Black) (from Sunset Boulevard) – 3.47
13. "Memory" (reprise) (Webber, Nunn, based on work from T. S. Eliot) (from Cats) – 1.09
