= Dominic Ferris =

British pianist, conductor, music producer

- Dominic Ferris recording at Masterchord Studios London

Background information
- Born: October 10, 1985 (age 41); Brighton, Sussex, England
- Occupations: Pianist, arranger, conductor, music producer, musical director
- Instrument: Piano
- Years active: 2009–present
- Website: dominicferris.com

Dominic Ferris (born 1985) is a British pianist, conductor, music producer, musical director, and singer. The son of pop songwriter and former Beatles sound engineer Roger Ferris and singer-songwriter Glo Macari, he is a Global Ambassador for Steinway & Sons. He is active in classical music, pop, and musical theatre, and performs as a solo artist, in the duo The Piano Brothers, as an accompanist and studio musician, and with orchestral shows. He is also an active producer and arranger known for working with a wide variety of artists, and as a conductor.

== Early life and education ==
Ferris was born in 1985 in Brighton, Sussex, England. He attended St. Christopher's School in Hove and was a chorister at All Saints Hove, then Hurstpierpoint College where he studied piano with Nicholas Searls. In 2010, he graduated from the Royal College of Music where he studied piano with Nigel Clayton.

== Career as solo and recording artist ==
Ferris performs solo piano and vocal arrangements of classic British and American songs by artists such as George Gershwin, Billy Joel, and Elton John. In 2018 he performed a yearlong residency at Live at Zédel with his show Me and My Piano. The Me and My Piano series continued into 2021.

Early in the COVID-19 pandemic, Ferris broadcast Live Piano Request shows on his social media from his Shoreham home. These were picked up for broadcast by Classic FM and Pianist Magazine. In December 2020, he performed a livestream concert from Steinway Hall in London. In 2021 he hosted a series of piano performance webinars for Pianist Magazine.

== Musical theatre ==
Early in his career, Ferris wrote musicals, working in his family's garage recording studio. Over time he came to work with Rob Ashford and other musical theatre producers, and in 2012 was vocal coach, pianist, and assistant to conductor David Charles Abell for the Finding Neverland world premiere production.

For several years, beginning in 2015, he was one half of musical theatre act Ferris & Milnes, with Martin Milnes.

== Collaborations ==
=== Steinway and Sons ===
When Ferris performed at an international press launch event for the Prince William–Kate Middleton royal wedding, a chance meeting with piano technician Ulrich Gerhartz led to Ferris's relationship with Steinway & Sons. He continues to the present day as a Steinway & Sons Global Ambassador.

In 2018, as a Steinway & Sons Global Ambassador, Ferris recorded original piano arrangements of classic popular and musical theatre songs for Steinway's self-playing Spirio piano.

=== The Piano Brothers ===
Since 2014 Ferris and Indonesian pianist/composer Elwin Hendrijanto, who met during their studies at the Royal College of Music, have performed as The Piano Brothers. The Piano Brothers are a Steinway Ensemble (the equivalent of an individual's status as a Steinway Artist). On their international concert tours they combine classical music, musical theatre, their own arrangements of popular songs such as Coldplay's "Viva la Vida" and Adele's "Rolling in the Deep," songbook numbers, and compositions of their own such as "Ballade for Steinway." The duo collaborated with the London Symphony Orchestra in 2019 on a recording at Abbey Road Studios of their symphonic arrangement of Muse's hit "Uprising" and perform internationally.

=== Ferris and Milnes ===
In 2015 Ferris formed a second duo, joining with Martin Milnes as musical theatre double act Ferris & Milnes.

They duo undertook performance feats such as "31 West End musicals in under 10 minutes" and the complete works of Andrew Lloyd Webber in seven minutes, and performed a George Gershwin medley at Lincoln Center. They performed their tribute "33 Sondheim Numbers in 5 Minutes" at the Stephen Sondheim 85th Birthday Gala at Theatre Royal, Drury Lane in 2015.

=== Other recording collaborations ===
Ferris has collaborated on recordings with performers such as Shirley Bassey, Jonathan Antoine, Alfie Boe, Michael Ball, and Kerry Ellis, many with producer Nick Patrick, and on symphonic albums with the Royal Philharmonic Orchestra performing music of Elvis Presley, Roy Orbison, and The Beach Boys and orchestrating and arranging for the Orbison and Beach Boys albums.

In 2015 Ferris recorded piano tracks for the Elvis Presley symphonic album If I Can Dream with the Royal Philharmonic Orchestra.

In 2018, Ferris worked with James Bowen and his cat Bob, the subject of the book and film A Street Cat Named Bob, to produce and co-write a charity single.

Ferris worked with Bassey as pianist on her 2020 Decca Records album I Owe It All To You.

He produced a video for the Official London Theatre's YouTube channel titled "We'll Meet Again" that featured West End stars including Alfie Boe and Hannah Waddingham and most prominently, Vera Lynn extending a message of hope and love during the COVID-19 pandemic lockdowns.

In 2023 Ferris began working with Luca Brugnoli, a 2022 BBC Young Chorister of the Year finalist, producing, performing on, and co-writing two songs for Brugnoli's 2024 debut mainstream album Through My Eyes.

=== Other live collaborations ===
In 2017 he toured as assistant musical director and pianist with the Royal Philharmonic Concert Orchestra's Elvis Presley: If I Can Dream UK arena tour, and with the Memphis Symphony Orchestra for the US anniversary tour. The latter included a performance at Graceland with Priscilla Presley for the Elvis 40th Anniversary Celebrations.

In May and June 2021, Ferris performed his solo show Piano Player to the Stars in London, and in August performed at the Royal Festival Hall in a series of concerts celebrating the 50th anniversary of Mike Oldfield's Tubular Bells album.

In October 2025, Ferris produced, hosted, and performed in a fundraising concert for the Friends of The Royal Marsden, held at Cadogan Hall in London.

== Honours ==
On May 26, 2026, Ferris was inducted into the Grand Order of Water Rats.

== Charity work ==
Ferris is an Ambassador for two charities: Restore the Music UK, which funds music education, and Dreams & Wishes, a charity for seriously ill children.

== Discography ==
Albums and singles
Year	Artist	Album/Project	Label/Organization	Role(s)
2012	Various	The Secret Code Original Musical Soundtrack	Macaferri Music / Michael Gatton	Pianist, producer, arranger
2013	The Piano Brothers	"Ballade for Steinway"	Steinway & Sons	Pianist, songwriter, producer
2013	Sochi Winter Olympics Opening Ceremony	"Sochi Winter Olympics (Time Forward)"	Various	Pianist
2014	Dominic Ferris	Dominic Anthony Ferris	Macaferri Music	Artist
2015	Various	Lovebirds Original Musical Soundtrack	SimG Records	Pianist, arranger
2015	Elvis Presley with the Royal Philharmonic Orchestra	If I Can Dream	Sony Music	Pianist
2017	Elvis Presley with the Royal Philharmonic Orchestra	Christmas with Elvis and the Royal Philharmonic Orchestra	Sony Music	Pianist
2017	Roy Orbison with the Royal Philharmonic Orchestra	A Love So Beautiful	Sony Music	Pianist
2018	Roy Orbison with the Royal Philharmonic Orchestra	Unchained Melodies	Sony Music	Arranger
2018	The Beach Boys with the Royal Philharmonic Orchestra	The Beach Boys with the Royal Philharmonic Orchestra	Universal Music Group	Pianist, arranger
2018	James Bowen with The Wild & Stray	"And Then Came Bob," "Time to Move On"	Macaferri Music	Pianist, songwriter, producer
2019	Michael Ball	Coming Home to You	Decca	Pianist, arranger
2019	Michael Ball & Alfie Boe	Back Together	Decca	Arranger
2020	Royal Philharmonic Orchestra	Disney Goes Classical	Decca	Arranger
2020	Jonathan Antoine	Going the Distance	LOKI Records	Pianist
2020	Jonathan Antoine	ChristmasLand	LOKI Records	Pianist
2020	Dame Vera Lynn & West End Stars	"We'll Meet Again 2020"	Society of London Theatre	Pianist, producer, arranger
2020	Dame Shirley Bassey	I Owe It All to You	Decca	Pianist, arranger
2021	Libera	If	Invisible Hands Music	Songwriter
2022	Katie Ashby	"Irreplaceable", "White Cliffs of Dover"	Dame Vera Lynn Estate	Pianist, producer, arranger
2022	Various	Tubular Bells 50th Anniversary Soundtrack	Kaleidoscope Home Entertainment	Pianist
2023	Cormac Thompson	A Borrowed Gift	Cormac Thompson Music Ltd	Pianist, songwriter, producer, arranger
2023	Resonanz Children's Choir & Libera	"Nusantara," "Sing for Our World"	Libera Official	Songwriter, producer
2023	London Symphony Orchestra	Classic Rock – Renaissance	BMG Music	Pianist, arranger
2024	Luca Brugnoli	Through My Eyes	LRB Music	Pianist, songwriter, producer, arranger
2024	Amy Nuttall	"Thank You Mother"	Amy Nuttall Music	Pianist, arranger
2024	Libera	Dream	Invisible Hands Music	Pianist
2025	Dame Shirley Bassey	Harry Potter Audiobook	Audible	Vocal producer
