= Live in Japan (Shirley Bassey album) =

Live album by Shirley Bassey
- Released: 1974
- Recorded: 1974
- Genre: Vocal
- Label: United Artists
- Producer: Noel Rogers

Shirley Bassey chronology
Nobody Does It Like Me (1974)	Live in Japan (1974)	The Shirley Bassey Singles Album (1975)

Alternative cover
- CD version

Live in Japan is a double album by Shirley Bassey, recorded July 8, 1974 at Kosei-Nenkin Kaikan Hall in Tokyo, Japan. The album was released in Japan only, and the reverse of the cover listed the songs in English and Japanese. Live at Carnegie Hall had been released just a year prior, with nine of the same songs from Live in Japan, and it is believed that this is at least partly the reason Live in Japan didn't gain a worldwide release. Japan was an important growing market for many artists in the 1970s and many recorded live albums exclusively for release in Japan.

In 1981 Liberty Records released this recording on a single album that had different cover art, cut three of the songs, "Going, Going Gone", "All That Love Went To Waste", and "You and I" and had a different running order.

The original double album has been reproduced in its entirety, with original running order, on a 2008 CD on the BGO label, and reproduces the text from a booklet that came with the LP, which included the lyrics in English and Japanese.

== Track listing ==
Side One

1. "Goldfinger" (Leslie Bricusse, Anthony Newley, John Barry)
2. "Sing" (Joe Raposo)
3. "Let Me Sing and I'm Happy" (Irving Berlin)
4. "Make the World a Little Younger" (Terry Howell, Karen O'Hara, Denny McReynolds)
5. "Going, Going, Gone" (John Barry, Alan Jay Lerner)

Side Two

1. "Without You" (Tom Evans, Pete Ham)
2. "Diamonds Are Forever" (John Barry, Don Black)
3. "When You Smile" (William Salter, Ralph MacDonald)
4. "All That Love Went to Waste" (George Barrie, Sammy Cahn)

Side Three

1. "Big Spender" (Dorothy Fields, Cy Coleman)
2. "Day by Day" (Stephen Schwartz, John-Michael Tebelack)
3. "Never, Never, Never" (Tony Renis, Alberto Testa, Norman Newell)
4. "Something" (George Harrison)
5. Tabs*

Side Four

1. "Yesterday, When I Was Young" (Charles Aznavour, Herbert Kretzmer)
2. Introduction of orchestra
3. "You and I" (Leslie Bricusse)
4. Tabs*
5. "This Is My Life" (Norman Newell, Bruno Canfora, Antonio Amum)
6. Tabs*
- * (Shirley Bassey acknowledging audience applause)

== Personnel ==
- Shirley Bassey – vocal
- Arthur Greenslade – musical director
- Nobuo Hara and His Sharps & Flats – orchestra
- Jack Cavari – guitar
- Bobby Shankin – drums
