= Let's Face the Music =

Studio album by Shirley Bassey
- Released: 1962
- Recorded: 1962
- Genre: Vocal
- Length: 52:30
- Label: EMI/Columbia
- Producer: Norman Newell

Shirley Bassey chronology
Shirley Bassey (1961)	Let's Face the Music (1962)	Shirley Stops the Shows (1965)

Shirley Bassey Sings The Hit Song From "Oliver!"
- US album cover

What Now My Love
- UK re-issue 1971

Let's Face the Music is the sixth Shirley Bassey studio album, released in 1962 and arranged by Nelson Riddle. Kenneth Hume, Shirley Bassey's husband and manager, wrote the sleeve notes for this album, in which he gives an insight into how this album came to be: "When Vic Lewis booked Nelson Riddle for a tour with Shirley, we were all very excited; being great fans of Nelson Riddle's from way back...so when someone suggested them doing an LP together, we thought that this would not be possible, remembering that Nelson was under contract with another recording company." Nelson Riddle was under contract to Capitol Records at the time, so Bassey's producer Norman Newell went about to secure his services for an album. While on the tour, Bassey, Riddle, and Bassey's music director Raymond Long, discussed what form the album should take. Shortly after the tour was completed, the recording sessions began.

This album was issued in the US as Shirley Bassey Sings The Hit Song From "Oliver!" on the United Artists label, with a slightly different track listing and alternative recordings. "I Can't Get You Out of My Mind" was replaced by "As Long As He Needs Me", and "Imagination", "All of Me" and "All the Things You Are" appear on Oliver! in alternative versions. The alternative versions have not yet been released in the UK and are still not available on CD.

The album entered the U.K. album chart in December 1962 and spent seven weeks on the charts peaking at #12 and was re-issued in 1971 as What Now My Love on the EMI Music For Pleasure (MFP) label, when it peaked at number 17 in a five-week run.

The original album was issued in mono and stereo. The stereo version of this album was released on CD in 1999 by EMI. The album was reissued on CD (7243 4 732226 2 4) by EMI in 2004 as part of the "60s 2 on 1" series - featuring 2 albums on 1 CD. The album was paired with the 1961 album Shirley. However, for this reissue, due to the time restrictions of placing 2 albums on a single CD, "I Should Care" and "The Second Time Around" from Let's Face the Music were omitted.

== Track listing ==
U.K. Version. Side One.

1. "Let's Face the Music and Dance" (Irving Berlin) – 3:11
2. "I Should Care" (Sammy Cahn, Axel Stordahl, Paul Weston) – 3:58
3. "Let's Fall in Love" (Harold Arlen, Ted Koehler) – 3:08
4. "The Second Time Around" (Cahn, Jimmy Van Heusen) – 4:34
5. "Imagination" (Johnny Burke, Van Heusen) – 4:04 (U.K. Version differs to U.S. Version)
6. "All the Things You Are" (Oscar Hammerstein, Jerome Kern) – 3:10 (U.K. Version differs to U.S. Version)

Side Two.

1. "I Get a Kick Out of You" (Cole Porter) – 2:52
2. "Everything I Have Is Yours" (Harold Adamson, Burton Lane) – 3:16
3. "Spring Is Here" (Lorenz Hart, Richard Rodgers) – 4:03
4. "All of Me" (Gerald Marks, Seymour Simons) – 2:48 (U.K. Version differs to U.S. Version)
5. "I Can't Get You Out of My Mind" (Victor Lewis) – 3:42 (Not on U.S. Version)
6. "What Now My Love" (Gilbert Bécaud, Pierre Leroyer, Carl Sigman) – 2:54

U.S. Version. Side One.

1. "As Long As He Needs Me" (Lionel Bart) – 2:58 (Not on U.K. Version)
2. "I Get a Kick Out of You" (Cole Porter) – 2:46
3. "Everything I Have Is Yours" (Harold Adamson, Burton Lane) – 3:06
4. "Spring Is Here" (Lorenz Hart, Richard Rodgers) – 3:55
5. "All of Me" (Gerald Marks, Seymour Simons) – 2:42 (Alternate U.S. Version)
6. "What Now My Love" (Gilbert Bécaud, Pierre Leroyer, Carl Sigman) – 2:50

Side Two.

1. "Let's Face the Music and Dance" (Irving Berlin) – 3:05
2. "I Should Care" (Sammy Cahn, Axel Stordahl, Paul Weston) – 3:55
3. "Let's Fall in Love" (Harold Arlen, Ted Koehler) – 3:03
4. "The Second Time Around" (Cahn, Jimmy Van Heusen) – 4:30
5. "Imagination" (Johnny Burke, Van Heusen) – 2:29 (Alternate U.S. Version)
6. "All the Things You Are" (Oscar Hammerstein, Jerome Kern) – 2:54 (Alternate U.S. Version)

== Personnel ==
- Shirley Bassey – vocal
- Nelson Riddle – arranger, conductor
- Nelson Riddle Orchestra – orchestra
