= The Shirley Bassey Singles Album =

Compilation album by Shirley Bassey
- Released: 28 February 1975
- Recorded: 1963–1974
- Genre: MOR
- Label: United Artists
- Producer: Noel Rogers

Shirley Bassey chronology
Live in Japan (1974)	The Shirley Bassey Singles Album (1975)	Good, Bad but Beautiful (1975)

The Shirley Bassey Singles Album is a compilation album released in 1975 by British singer Shirley Bassey.

Having seen a sales dip in the latter half of the 1960s, Bassey enjoyed a successful comeback in the 1970s, beginning with the single and album hits, "Something". This continued over the next few years with several high-selling albums and in 1975, her record label United Artists, released a collection of songs taken from this period, plus "Big Spender" and "If You Go Away" (which were featured on a 1960s album that had been re-released and a hit in 1971).The Shirley Bassey Singles Album was an immediate hit, going gold a month after its release, and peaking at No.2 in the UK—her highest charting album—during a 24-week run. The album included the top 10 singles "Something", "For All We Know" and "Never Never Never" as well as featuring the hits "Fool on the Hill" and "Diamonds are Forever", which had not featured on any of her albums up to this point.

This album was first released on CD in 1988 with bonus tracks and retitled as Shirley Bassey The Singles.

== Track listing ==
Side One

1. "Something" (George Harrison) – 3:35 (Recorded in 1970)
2. "(Where Do I Begin?) Love Story" (Francis Lai, Carl Sigman) – 3:13 (Recorded in 1971)
3. "Diamonds Are Forever" (John Barry, Don Black) – 2:41 (Recorded in 1971)
4. "The Fool on the Hill" (John Lennon, Paul McCartney) – 3:14 (Recorded in 1970)
5. "Make the World a Little Younger" (Terry Howell, L. O'Hara) – 3:31 (Recorded in 1973)
6. "Big Spender" (Cy Coleman, Dorothy Fields) – 1:49 (Recorded in 1967)

Side Two

1. "Never, Never, Never" (Tony Renis, Alberto Testa, Norman Newell) – 3:37 (Recorded in 1973)
2. "When You Smile" (William Salter, Ralph MacDonald) – 3:28 (Recorded in 1974)
3. "If You Go Away" (Rod McKuen, Jacques Brel) – 4:31 (Recorded in 1967)
4. "And I Love You So" (Don McLean) – 4:27 (Recorded in 1972)
5. "Does Anybody Miss Me" (Les Reed, Johnny Worth) – 2:27 (Recorded in 1969)
6. "For All We Know" (Fred Karlin, Arthur James, Robb Wilson) – 2:43 (Recorded in 1971)

Bonus tracks on CD re-issue:

1. "Goldfinger" (Leslie Bricusse, Anthony Newley, John Barry) – 2:49 (Recorded in 1964)
2. "No Regrets" (Charles Dumond, Michel Vaucaire, Hal David) – 2:45 (Recorded in 1963)
3. "I (Who Have Nothing)" (Mogal, Carlo Domida, Jerry Leiber, Mike Stoller) – 2:41 (Recorded in 1963)
4. "What Kind of Fool Am I" (Leslie Bricusse, Anthony Newley) – 3:16 (Recorded in 1963)

== Charts ==
=== Weekly charts ===
Chart (1975)	Peak position
Australian Albums (Kent Music Report)	34
New Zealand Albums (RMNZ)	7
UK Albums (OCC)	2

=== Year-end charts ===
Chart (1975)	Position
UK Albums (OCC)	23

== Certifications and sales ==
Region	Certification	Certified units/sales
United Kingdom (BPI)	Gold	100,000^{^}
^{^} Shipments figures based on certification alone.
