= The Show Must Go On (Shirley Bassey album) =

Studio album by Shirley Bassey
- Released: 28 October 1996
- Recorded: 1996
- Genre: MOR
- Label: PolyGramTV
- Producer: Mike Smith

Shirley Bassey chronology
Sings the Movies (1993)	The Show Must Go On (1996)	The Remix Album...Diamonds Are Forever (2000)

The Show Must Go On is a 1996 album by Shirley Bassey. It spent 11 weeks on the UK albums chart, peaking at No. 47. The album was awarded a silver disc. The album was produced by Mike Smith.

== Track listing ==
1. "Slave to the Rhythm" (Bruce Woolley, Simon Darlow, Stephen Lipson, Trevor Horn)
2. "You'll See" (Madonna, David Foster)
3. "Every Breath You Take" (Sting)
4. "Can I Touch You There" (Michael Bolton, Robert John "Mutt" Lange)
5. "I'll Stand By You" (Chrissie Hynde, Tom Kelly, Billy Steinberg)
6. "When I Need You" (Albert Hammond, Carole Bayer Sager)
7. "All Woman" (Ian Devaney, Andy Morris, Lisa Stansfield)
8. "He Kills Everything" (Peter Bischof-Fallenstein)
9. "Where Is the Love" (Ralph MacDonald, William Salter)
10. "We've Got Tonight" (Bob Seger)
11. "One Day I'll Fly Away" (Joe Sample, Will Jennings)
12. "Hello" (Lionel Richie)
13. "Baby Come To Me" (Rod Temperton)
14. "The Show Must Go On" (Queen)
