= Shirley Bassey (TV series) =

- Directed by: Stewart Morris
- Presented by: Shirley Bassey
- Country of origin: United Kingdom
- Original language: English
- No. of series: 2
- No. of episodes: 13

Original release
- Network: BBC One
- Release: 30 October 1976 – 8 December 1979

Shirley Bassey is a British variety show that premiered on BBC in 1976. The show was hosted by Welsh singer Shirley Bassey and produced by Stewart Morris. The first six-episode series was nominated for the Golden Rose of Montreux in 1977. This was followed by a second series of six episodes in 1979. The musical guests included The Three Degrees, Charles Aznavour, Neil Diamond and Dusty Springfield.

== Episodes ==
=== Series 1 (1976) ===
Series one was broadcast on Saturdays on BBC1. The series (excluding the 7th highlights episode) was repeated on BBC2 on non-consecutive Thursdays from 23 June – 4 August 1977.

No. overall	No. in series	Title	Directed by	Original release date
1	1	"Episode 1"	Stewart Morris	30 October 1976 at 8:15 pm
Making for BBC Television the first series in her outstanding career. Guest stars: Charles Aznavour, The Three Degrees and 'Emma' (Bassey's Old English Sheep Dog). With The Shirley Bassey Dancers choreographed by Nigel Lythgoe and Arthur Greenslade and his orchestra.
2	2	"Episode 2"	Stewart Morris	6 November 1976 at 8:15 pm
Guest stars Rolf Harris, Janis Ian, The Brythoniad Male Voice Choir and 'Emma'. With The Shirley Bassey Dancers choreographed by Nigel Lythgoe and Arthur Greenslade and his orchestra.
3	3	"Episode 3"	Stewart Morris	13 November 1976 at 8:15 pm
Guest stars Johnny Nash, Gilbert O'Sullivan and 'Emma'. With The Shirley Bassey Dancers choreographed by Nigel Lythgoe and Arthur Greenslade and his orchestra.
4	4	"Episode 4"	Stewart Morris	20 November 1976 at 8:15 pm
Guest stars Morris Albert, The Stan Getz Quartet and 'Emma'. With The Shirley Bassey Dancers choreographed by Nigel Lythgoe and Arthur Greenslade and his orchestra.
5	5	"Episode 5"	Stewart Morris	27 November 1976 at 8:35 pm
Guest stars Mel Torme, Clive Westlake and 'Emma'. With The Shirley Bassey Dancers choreographed by Nigel Lythgoe and Arthur Greenslade and his orchestra.
6	6	"Episode 6"	Stewart Morris	4 December 1976 at 8:35 pm
Guest stars Bobby Goldsboro, Rod McKuen and 'Emma'. With The Shirley Bassey Dancers choreographed by Nigel Lythgoe and Arthur Greenslade and his orchestra. This programme was selected as the BBC's entry for the Festival of the Golden Rose of Montreux 1977 and was repeated on BBC2 7 April 1977 at 8:25 pm.
7	7	"Highlights compilation"	Stewart Morris	23 December 1977 at 9:15 pm
Shirley Bassey introduces highlights from her 1976 television series. Guest stars Charles Aznavour, Rolf Harris, Johnny Nash and 'Emma'.

=== Series 2 (1979) ===
Season two was broadcast on alternate Saturdays on BBC1. This Series repeated on Mondays on BBC2 from 15 September – 20 October 1980 at 8:15 pm.

No. overall	No. in series	Title	Directed by	Original release date
8	1	"Episode 1"	Stewart Morris	30 September 1979 at 8:20 pm
The first programme of a new series of six television spectaculars, with her guest stars: Dana, The Three Degrees and Sal Davis. With The Shirley Bassey Dancers choreographed by Nigel Lythgoe and Arthur Greenslade and his orchestra.
9	2	"Episode 2"	Stewart Morris	13 October 1979 at 8:15 pm
Guest stars: Freddy Cole, Paul Daniels and Tony Monopoly. With The Shirley Bassey Dancers choreographed by Nigel Lythgoe and Arthur Greenslade and his orchestra.
10	3	"Episode 3"	Stewart Morris	27 October 1979 at 8:15 pm
Guest stars: Lulu, The Drifters and Demis Roussos. With The Shirley Bassey Dancers choreographed by Nigel Lythgoe and Arthur Greenslade and his orchestra.
11	4	"Episode 4"	Stewart Morris	10 November 1979 at 8:15 pm
Guest stars: Les Dawson, The Nolan Sisters and Third World. With The Shirley Bassey Dancers choreographed by Nigel Lythgoe and Arthur Greenslade and his orchestra.
12	5	"Episode 5"	Stewart Morris	24 November 1979 at 8:15 pm
Guest stars: The King's Singers, Michel Legrand and Dusty Springfield. With The Shirley Bassey Dancers choreographed by Nigel Lythgoe and Arthur Greenslade and his orchestra.
13	6	"Episode 6"	Stewart Morris	8 December 1979 at 8:15 pm
Guest stars: Lennie Bennett & Jerry Stevens, Pete Conrad and The Swingle Singers. With The Shirley Bassey Dancers choreographed by Nigel Lythgoe and Arthur Greenslade and his orchestra.
