= Shirley (album) =

Studio album by Shirley Bassey
- Released: February 1961
- Recorded: 1961
- Genre: Vocal
- Label: EMI/Columbia
- Producer: Norman Newell

Shirley Bassey chronology
The Fabulous Shirley Bassey (1959)	Shirley (1961)	Shirley Bassey (1962)

Professional ratings
Review scores
Source	Rating
AllMusic	3/5 stars
Uncut	3/5 stars

Shirley is Shirley Bassey's fourth studio album and her second for Columbia Records. Featuring music from Geoff Love and his orchestra, it was her first to enter the top ten of the UK Albums Chart and last until Something in 1970. It was printed in mono and stereo versions, the latter reissued on CD in 1997.

== Track listing ==
Side one

1. "In the Still of the Night" (Cole Porter) – 3:20
2. "Let There Be Love" (Lionel Grant, Ian Rand) – 3:10
3. "All At Once (Déjà)" (Dorcas Cochran, Emil Stern, Eddy Marnay) – 3:30
4. "For Every Man There's a Woman" (Leo Robin, Harold Arlen) – 3:50
5. "I'm in the Mood for Love" (Jimmy McHugh, Dorothy Fields) – 3:19
6. "So In Love" (Cole Porter) – 3:01

Side two

1. "If I Were a Bell" (Frank Loesser) – 2:51
2. "There Will Never Be Another You" (Harry Warren, Mack Gordon) – 2:51
3. "Hooray for Love" (Arlen, Robin) – 3:09
4. "Too Late Now" (Alan Jay Lerner, Burton Lane) – 3:37
5. "I'm Shooting High" (Ted Koehler, McHugh) – 2:19
6. "Ev'ry Time We Say Goodbye" (Cole Porter) – 5:13

== Personnel ==
- Shirley Bassey – vocal
- Geoff Love – arranger, conductor
- Geoff Love and his Orchestra – orchestra
