= Keep the Music Playing =

Studio album by Shirley Bassey
- Released: 7 May 1991
- Genre: Vocal / MOR
- Length: 53:53
- Label: FreeStyle
- Producer: Michael Alexander and Mark Sinclair

Shirley Bassey chronology
La Mujer (1989)	Keep the Music Playing (1991)	The Bond Collection (1992)

Keep the Music Playing is a 1991 album by Shirley Bassey. The album was recorded in the UK at the Westgreen Studios and in the Netherlands at Wisseloord Studios, Hilversum. The album is a mixture of contemporary pop ballads, such as "I Want to Know What Love Is" from Foreigner, the Jennifer Rush power ballad "The Power of Love", and the more gentle "Still" from Lionel Richie, combined with standards from the field of jazz and pop, such as "He Was Beautiful", the sweet jazz ballad from Cleo Laine. Several of the song arrangements reflect an operatic pop style influence, which may have roots in her 1984 album I Am What I Am, which she recorded with the London Symphony Orchestra, and the fact that in the latter mid-1980s she started working with a vocal coach, a former opera singer. Bassey returned to the Beatles with "Yesterday", as she had previously covered "Something" and "Fool on the Hill" successfully in the 1970s, and had performed "Hey Jude" frequently live. Another previously successful formula was used for the closing track "Dio, Come Ti Amo (Oh God How Much I Love You)" an Italian original in the tradition of "This is My Life" and "Natalie". ("Dio, Come Ti Amo" was the Italian entry for the Eurovision Song Contest in 1966, performed in Italian by Domenico Modugno).

The album was a commercial success and entered the UK album charts in May 1991, peaking at number 25. At the time, Bassey was 54 years old, becoming "the oldest woman ever to chart an album of new material." The original release was on vinyl, cassette and CD, the CD was issued by Dino Records in the UK and ZYX Records in Germany. FreeStyle Records is now defunct but this album has been re-issued on CD many times on various labels.

== Track listing ==
1. "How Do You Keep the Music Playing?" (Michel Legrand, Alan Bergman, Marilyn Bergman) - 4.47
2. "He Was Beautiful" (Cleo Laine, Stanley Myers) - 4.12
3. "The Power of Love" (Gunther Mende, Candy DeRouge, Jennifer Rush, Mary Susan Applegate) - 4.34
4. "Still" (Lionel Richie) - 5.44
5. "All I Ask Of You" (Andrew Lloyd Webber, Charles Hart) - 3.56
6. "I Want to Know What Love Is" (Mick Jones) - 4.56
7. "Wind Beneath My Wings" (Larry Henley, Jeff Silbar) - 4.19
8. "Yesterday" (John Lennon, Paul McCartney) - 3.20
9. "That's What Friends Are For" (Burt Bacharach, Carole Bayer Sager) - 4.06
10. "Sorry Seems to Be the Hardest Word" (Elton John, Bernie Taupin) - 3.46
11. "The Greatest Love of All" (Michael Masser, Linda Creed) - 5.28 (re-recording original on The Magic Is You) (1978)
12. "Dio, Come Ti Amo (Oh God How Much I Love You)" (Domenico Modugno) - 4.45

== Personnel ==
- Shirley Bassey - Vocals
- Michael Alexander - Producer, acoustic piano, keyboards and bass
- Mark Sinclair - Producer, acoustic piano
- Jude Hudson - Bass, keyboard, drums and MIDI programming
- Graham Broad - Drums
- Christian Barton - Drums
- Chris Davis - Sax solos
- Andy Price - Guitar

== Singles ==
The album was predated by the release of a cover of "How Do You Keep the Music Playing?" by Michel Legrand, with "The Greatest Love of All" as B-side (the latter being a re-recording of the track, which was recorded originally for Bassey's 1979 album The Magic Is You). The CD single release featured "I Want to Know What Love Is" as a bonus track. A music video was also shot in order to promote the single.

=== Track listing: 7" single "How Do You Keep the Music Playing?" ===
A:"How Do You Keep the Music Playing?" (Michel Legrand, Alan Bergman, Marilyn Bergman) - 4 .47

B:"The Greatest Love of All" (Michael Masser, Linda Creed) - 5.28

Issued in Germany on the ZYX 7" single ZYX 6510-7, the single failed to chart.

=== Track listing: CD single "How Do You Keep the Music Playing?" ===
1."How Do You Keep the Music Playing?" (Michel Legrand, Alan Bergman, Marilyn Bergman) - 4 .47

2."The Greatest Love of All" (Michael Masser, Linda Creed) - 5.28

3."I Want to Know What Love Is" (Mick Jones) - 4.56

Issued in Germany on the ZYX CD single ZYX 6510-8, the single failed to chart.

"That's What Friends Are For"

Single by Shirley Bassey
- Released: 2005
- Recorded: 1991
- Genre: Dance-pop, pop
- Length: 3.47
- Label: ZYX Records
- Songwriters: Burt Bacharach, Carole Bayer Sager
- Producer: Easyjetters for ZYX

Shirley Bassey singles chronology
"Where Do I Begin" (2000)	"That's What Friends Are For" (2005)	"The Living Tree" (2007)

"That's What Friends Are For" was released in Germany in 2005 by ZYX Records. This single is a remix of the 1991 track recorded for the album Keep the Music Playing. Only the first two tracks feature the vocals of Shirley Bassey. The CD sleeve notes list the version in the wrong order, the track listing below is the corrected order. The single was not official promoted by Shirley Bassey. The single failed to reach any chart listing.

=== Track listing: CD single "That's What Friends Are For" (2005 remix) ===
1. "That's What Friends Are For" (House party mix) (performed by Shirley Bassey) - 3.47
2. "That's What Friends Are For" (House party extended mix) (performed by Shirley Bassey) - 5.08
3. "That's What Friends Are For" (House party cover) (performed by Rene K) - 3.51
4. "That's What Friends Are For" (Ballade cover) (performed by Rene K) - 3.51
5. "That's What Friends Are For" (House party cover karaoke mix) - 3.51
6. "That's What Friends Are For" (Ballade cover karaoke mix) - 3.51

=== Personnel ===
- Shirley Bassey - Vocal (tracks 1 and 2)
- Rene K - Vocal (tracks 3 and 4)
- Ismail Boulaghmal - Keyboards and Vocals
- Roberto Misto - Keyboards and Vocals

Alternative version

Previous to this single the track also appeared in a different remix on a German compilation CD titled Golden Disco-Hits 2 issued by Dance Street Records.

1. "That's What Friends Are For" (2005 Club mix) (performed by Shirley Bassey) - 4.08
