= If I Can Dream (album) =

Compilation album by Elvis Presley with the Royal Philharmonic Orchestra
- Released: 30 October 2015
- Recorded: 2013–2015
- Genres: Orchestral pop, rock
- Length: 49:46
- Labels: RCA, Legacy
- Producers: Nick Patrick, Don Reedman (also exec.), Mauro Dirago, Priscilla Presley (exec.)

Elvis Presley chronology
The Complete '60s Albums Collection Vol. 2: 1966-1969 (2015)	If I Can Dream (2015)	Way Down in the Jungle Room (2016)

Singles from If I Can Dream
- 1. "If I Can Dream" Released: 12 August 2015; 2. "Fever" Released: 14 September 2015; 3. "You've Lost That Lovin' Feelin'" Released: 6 October 2015; 4. "An American Trilogy" Released: 14 October 2015; 5. "And the Grass Won't Pay No Mind" Released: 21 October 2015; 6. "Burning Love" Released: 23 October 2015

Alternate cover
- Box set version cover

If I Can Dream is a compilation album by American singer Elvis Presley. It was released on 30 October 2015 by RCA Records and Legacy Recordings. The album features archival vocal recordings of Presley accompanied by new orchestral arrangements by the Royal Philharmonic Orchestra. It also features duets with Canadian singer Michael Bublé and Italian trio Il Volo. If I Can Dream was recorded at Abbey Road Studios in London, England, and it was produced by Nick Patrick and Don Reedman, with piano orchestration (and assistant musical director duties on the accompanying world tour) by Dominic Ferris.

The album debuted at number one in the United Kingdom, giving Presley a record-equalling 12th UK number one. As of September 2016, the album had sold 1.6 million copies worldwide. A second album featuring the Royal Philharmonic Orchestra, The Wonder of You was released on 21 October 2016.

The project was backed by Priscilla Presley, who participated in the proceedings and was co-executive producer of the album. The If I Can Dream UK arena tour included the Czech Symphony Orchestra for the European Tour and Memphis Symphony Orchestra for the USA anniversary tour. It culminated with a performance at Graceland with Priscilla Presley for the Elvis 40th Anniversary celebration

== Background ==
This is the album I think he always would have wanted to do. The label would have never allowed him to have an orchestra. And if it was up to [manager] Colonel Parker, he would have had Elvis just singing — no background, no nothing. I think we have given him the freedom here to experiment with all the orchestras he would have loved in the pieces."

— Priscilla Presley on the album.

If I Can Dream was released in commemoration of Presley's 80th birthday celebration throughout 2015. In an interview with Rolling Stone, Elvis's ex-wife Priscilla Presley, said the vision of the album was to keep Elvis relevant: "Our culture and music has changed so drastically, I think that we have to keep [Elvis] right in line and do whatever we can to keep him current". Priscilla Presley also said the album is carrying the "DNA of Elvis Presley and keeping him authentic". The album was named after Elvis's 1968 single of the same name. Presley continued: "This would be a dream come true for Elvis. He would have loved to play with such a prestigious symphony orchestra. The music...the force that you feel with his voice and the orchestra is exactly what he would have done."

== Commercial performance ==
After debuting at number 1 in the UK, If I Can Dream tied Presley with Madonna for the most UK number-one albums by a solo artist, with each having 12. It is also Presley's 50th album to hit the UK top 10, and 59 years since his first number-one album on the chart, also a record. It sold 79,000 units in its first week at number one. It became the year's top selling album by a non UK artist, the top three being Adele's 25, Ed Sheeran's x and Sam Smith's In the Lonely Hour. On 5 January 2016, The Independent reported that the album was the 12th best-selling home entertainment title of 2015, which, along with the tremendous success of the aforementioned Adele and Sheeran albums, helped drive a 4% increase in UK music sales with respect of those of 2014. As of October 2016, If I Can Dream had sold 1,062,457 copies in the UK.

In the United States, the album debuted and peaked at number 21 on the Billboard 200 after having entered the Billboard Classical Chart at number 17 the previous week. Due to the inclusion of the Royal Philharmonic Orchestra, this marked the first time a Presley record had entered that chart. It then jumped from #17 to #1 in its second week and held that position in its third week, while then successively remaining inside the top 15 positions for the next forty eight weeks. As of September 2016, the album had sold nearly 100,000 copies in the United States.

If I Can Dream debuted at number 3 on the New Zealand Albums Chart and entered at number 1 in both the Scottish and Australian album charts. In the former, he remained in the first three positions for the next seven weeks, returning to number 1 in the ninth. In the latter, it held the top spot for a second week, became Presley's second chart-topping album after ELV1S: 30 No. 1 Hits in 2002 and by 31 December had become the 11th biggest album seller of 2015.

== Track listing ==
No.	Title	Writer(s)	Length
1.	"Burning Love"	Dennis Linde	3:31
2.	"It's Now or Never" (featuring Il Volo)	Aaron Schroeder, Wally Gold	3:18
3.	"Love Me Tender"	Vera Matson, Elvis Presley	3:26
4.	"Fever" (featuring Michael Bublé)	Eddie Cooley, John Davenport	4:26
5.	"Bridge over Troubled Water"	Paul Simon	4:37
6.	"And the Grass Won't Pay No Mind"	Neil Diamond	3:41
7.	"You've Lost That Loving Feeling"	Barry Mann, Phil Spector, Cynthia Weil	4:00
8.	"There's Always Me"	Don Robertson	2:21
9.	"Can't Help Falling in Love"	Hugo Peretti, Luigi Creatore, George Weiss	3:19
10.	"In the Ghetto"	Mac Davis	3:13
11.	"How Great Thou Art"	Trad., arr. Robin Smith, Don Reedman, Nick Patrick	3:08
12.	"Steamroller Blues"	James Taylor	3:10
13.	"An American Trilogy"	Trad., arr. Mickey Newbury	4:33
14.	"If I Can Dream"	Walter Earl Brown	3:12

== Charts and certifications ==
=== Weekly charts ===
Chart (2015)	Peak position
Australian Albums (ARIA)	1
Austrian Albums (Ö3 Austria)	2
Belgian Albums (Ultratop Flanders)	10
Belgian Albums (Ultratop Wallonia)	12
Canadian Albums (Billboard)	20
Dutch Albums (Album Top 100)	7
French Albums (SNEP)	29
Irish Albums (IRMA)	1
Italian Albums (FIMI)	27
New Zealand Albums (RMNZ)	2
Norwegian Albums (VG-lista)	10
Scottish Albums (Official Charts)	1
Spanish Albums (Promusicae)	17
Swedish Albums (Sverigetopplistan)	28
Swiss Albums (Schweizer Hitparade)	27
UK Albums (Official Charts)	1
UK Album Downloads (Official Charts)	1
US Billboard 200	21
US Top Classical Albums (Billboard)	1

=== Year-end charts ===
Chart (2015)	Position
Australian Albums (ARIA)	11
Irish Albums (IRMA)	14
New Zealand Albums (RMNZ)	50
UK Albums (OCC)	4
Chart (2016)	Position
Australian Albums (ARIA)	46
UK Albums (OCC)	22

=== Decade-end charts ===
Chart (2010–2019)	Position
UK Albums (OCC)	31

=== Certifications ===
Region	Certification	Certified units/sales
Australia (ARIA)	Platinum	70,000^{^}
Austria (IFPI Austria)	Gold	7,500^{*}
United Kingdom (BPI)	4× Platinum	1,291,457
^{*} Sales figures based on certification alone.^{^} Shipments figures based on certification alone.

== See also ==
- List of number-one albums of 2015 (Australia)
- List of number-one albums of 2015 in the United Kingdom
