= Good, Bad but Beautiful =

Studio album by Shirley Bassey
- Released: 17 October 1975
- Genre: Vocal / MOR
- Label: United Artists
- Producer: Martin Davis

Shirley Bassey chronology
The Shirley Bassey Singles Album (1975)	Good, Bad but Beautiful (1975)	Love, Life and Feelings (1976)

Good, Bad but Beautiful is a 1975 album by Shirley Bassey. In the first half of the decade, Bassey recorded nine albums (with three being live LPs ), three making the top ten. In March 1975, Bassey released a compilation that became her highest-charting album to date, The Shirley Bassey Singles Album (#2) and reflected the momentum Bassey had maintained since her 1970 "comeback". Good, Bad but Beautiful, released in the autumn of 1975, spent seven weeks on the UK Albums Chart, peaking at #13, and earned a silver disc. The album reflects the formula that brought Bassey back to the charts: a combination of contemporary songs combined with her forte of standards, show tunes, and torch songs, featuring arrangements aimed squarely at the adult contemporary, or middle-of-the-road, audience. This was also achieved by modifying her backup orchestra to include electric guitars, a string and brass section with a more contemporary sound, and drumming that is more soft rock-oriented than jazz-oriented, while side two's opener, "Feel Like Makin' Love" displays a smooth jazz style.

This was Bassey's seventh album of the 1970s to make the Billboard 200, peaking at #186. It also reached #54 on the US R&B chart. In the UK the album was awarded a silver disc six weeks after it was released. The original release was in stereo on vinyl and cassette. In 2005, BGO Records issued a remastered Good, Bad but Beautiful, together with the 1973 album Never Never Never, on a 2-CD set.

== Track listing ==
Side One

1. "Emotion" (Patti Dahlstrom, Véronique Sanson) - 4.17
2. "Send in the Clowns" from the Musical Show A Little Night Music (Stephen Sondheim) - 3.22
3. "Good, Bad but Beautiful" (Clive Westlake) - 3.24
4. "Sing" (Joe Raposo) - 3.27
5. "The Way We Were" from the Film The Way We Were (Alan Bergman, Marilyn Bergman, Marvin Hamlisch) - 2.48
6. "I'll Be Your Audience" (Becky Hobbs, Lewis Anderson) - 3.05

Side Two

1. "Feel Like Makin' Love" (Gene McDaniels) - 3.38
2. "All in Love Is Fair" (Stevie Wonder) - 3.55
3. "Run on and on and On" (Mercia Love) - 3.24
4. "The Other Side of Me" (Neil Sedaka) - 3.42
5. "Jessie" (Janis Ian) 3.53
6. "Living" (Gilbert Bécaud, Pierre Delanoë, Marcel Stellman) - 3.41

== Personnel ==
- Shirley Bassey – vocal
- Arthur Greenslade – arranger, conductor
- Del Newman – arranger, conductor ("The Way We Were")
- Martin Rushent – engineer
- Richard Avedon – photography
- Bob Cato – art direction and design
