= Ozi: Voice of the Forest =

2023 animated film

- UK theatrical release poster
- Directed by: Tim Harper
- Screenplay by: Ricky Roxburgh
- Story by: Rodrigo Blaas; Keith Chapman; Alan Duncan Ross
- Produced by: Mike Medavoy; Leonardo DiCaprio; Rodrigo Blaas; Ramsay McBean; Philip Watson; Keith Chapman; Graham Appleby; Adam Stanhope
- Starring: Amandla Stenberg; Dean-Charles Chapman; Djimon Hounsou; Donald Sutherland; Laura Dern; RuPaul Charles; Urzila Carlson
- Edited by: Mélanie Moulin
- Music by: Richard Harvey; Elwin Hendrijanto
- Production companies: Appian Way Productions; GCI Film
- Distributed by: Signature Entertainment (United Kingdom); KMBO (France); Ketchup Entertainment (United States)
- Release dates: June 13, 2023 (Annecy); August 16, 2024 (United Kingdom)
- Running time: 87 minutes
- Countries: United Kingdom; France; United States; Canada
- Language: English
- Budget: $40 million
- Box office: $5.5 million

Ozi: Voice of the Forest is a 2023 animated adventure comedy film written by Ricky Roxburgh and directed by Tim Harper. This film marked the final film role of Donald Sutherland before his death on June 20, 2024 at the age of 88 years. The film addresses the topic of deforestation and other ecological issues.

== Plot ==
Ozi is a female orangutan living in the forest with her parents. One night, a fire provoked by humans separates her from her family. She is saved by Kirani, an environmental worker who manages a foster home for orphaned primates. After a few years Ozi manages to master sign language and becomes, through a translation device, an online influencer through educational videos. Later, she receives a tablet from a company inviting her to visit but Kirani denies her the present. Ozi opens the tablet at night and discovers the company hosts her parents, who have survived. With the help of Chance, she reaches the facility, a sort of artificial zoo gathering a few animals from the zones the company, which produces palm oil, has destroyed in order to instal palm plantations. When she discovers that, Ozi, with the help of Chance and other animals, tries to free them from the facility. She only manages to escape death by publishing a video where she reveals the truth about the company, forcing them to stop their current destruction of more forests.

== Cast ==
- Amandla Stenberg as Ozi, an orangutan
- Laura Dern as Ozi's Mother
- Donald Sutherland as Smiley, an Albino Crocodile
- Djimon Hounsou as Ozi's Father
- RuPaul as Gurd, an Albino Crocodile and Smiley's son
- Dean-Charles Chapman as Chance
- Rachel Shenton as Kirani Hands
- Urzila Carlson as Honkus
- Kemah Bob as Jelly
- Josh Whitehouse as Peanut
- Hugh Bonneville as The Narrator

== Production ==
In July 2021, it was announced that Stenberg and several other actors were cast in voice roles for the film.

== Release ==
The film premiered at the Annecy International Animation Film Festival on June 13, 2023. Full-length scenes of the film were previously revealed at Annecy on June 15, 2022.

In October 2023, it was announced that Signature Entertainment acquired distribution rights to the film in the United Kingdom and Ireland. In June 2024, it was announced that Ketchup Entertainment acquired the film's North American distribution rights. It was released in theaters in the United Kingdom on August 16, 2024.

== Reception ==
A review in The Guardian wrote, "Orangutan Ozi is an eco chimpfluencer in a film whose excellent animation is let down by underdeveloped characters and blind faith in social media activism."

"Using clever narrative tricks, the story highlights the challenges animals face when their habitat is destroyed, offering a different perspective on the difficult environmental situation and reflecting on our relationship with nature and the importance of preserving it.", commented Il Mattino.
