= Elwin Hendrijanto =

Indonesian composer (born 1986)

- Born: February 3, 1986 (age 40); Semarang, Indonesia
- Genres: Film score; Classical
- Occupations: Composer; Arranger; Music director; Music producer
- Instruments: Piano; Keyboards
- Years active: 2014–present
- Website: elwinmusic.com

Elwin Hendrijanto (born 3 February 1986) is an Indonesian composer, pianist, music producer, and music director.

== Education ==
In 2008, Hendrijanto graduated cum laude on a scholarship for Bachelors of Music in Performance Classical Piano from Utrechts Conservatorium. He then continued his studies at the Royal College of Music in London where he studied both Integrated Masters Programme in Composition for Screen and Integrated Masters PGdip in Performance Classical Piano on a scholarship which was supported by the Prince Bernhard Cultural Funds.

== Career ==
=== The Piano Brothers ===
During his studies at the Royal College of Music, Hendrijanto teamed up with Dominic Ferris and created The Piano Brothers. Their international concert tours consists of live performances in which the duo plays their own arrangements. They have had collaborations with the London Symphony Orchestra and has made a performance on the Friday Night Is Music Night for BBC Radio 2 together with the BBC Concert Orchestra. The Piano Brothers have since then been appointed as Brand Ambassadors for international piano brand Steinway & Sons and are now Steinway Ensemble Artists.

=== Composition ===
Known for his works in crossover and orchestral music, Hendrijanto has made music for internationally known artists such as The Beach Boys, Roy Orbison and the Royal Philharmonic Orchestra. Hendrijanto is the founder of Elwin Music, a music production and audio post production company, which has made works for internationally known companies.

His notable commissions include the official soundtrack for the 2018 Asian Games ad campaign. In 2019, he won the Regional Award for Best Theme Song/Title Theme at the Asian Academy Creative Awards. In 2020, he joined the jury for the Citra Pariwara after winning a medal for Best Use of Sound the year prior. He also composed music for Alibaba Cloud’s 2024 Olympics advertisement campaign.

in 2025, Hendrijanto served as music director and composer for Pagelaran Sabang Merauke: The Indonesian Broadway - Hikayat Nusantara. He crafted a sweeping musical narrative that blended traditional Indonesian instruments and melodies with modern orchestral arrangements. The production includes 31 musical pieces, performed by the Jakarta Concert Orchestra (conducted by Avip Priatna), Batavia Madrigal Singers, The Resonanz Children's Choir, and an ensemble of pop and traditional artists.

== Filmography ==
=== Feature films ===
- Dreams directed by Guntur Soeharjanto (2016)
- Love is Blind directed by Rachmania Arunita (2019)
- #MoveonAja directed by Hestu Saputra (2019)
- Riki Rhino directed by Erwin Budiono (2020)
- Preman directed by Randolf Zaini (2020)
- The Flame (Bara) directed by Arfan Sabran (2021)
- Surga Di Bawah Langit directed by Pritagita Arianegara (2021)
- Ozi: Voice of the Forest directed by Tim Harper (2023)

=== Short films ===
- Untouchable by Simran Sidhu (2010)
- The Making of a Steinway Model B Grand Piano by Glen Milner
- Termination by Simran Sidhu (2013)
- Hard to Lose by Manfredi Mancuso (2015)
- Edit / Undo by Tom Brooks and Tom Shennan (2015)
- Rain by Simran Sidhu (2017)
- Cipak Cipuk by Andra Fembriarto (2021)

=== TV and Web Series ===
- Goresan Jejak 2 by Jurnal Indonesia Karya
- Goresan Jejak 1 by Jurnal Indonesia Karya
- Brata season 1 and season 2
- Mama Mama Milenial
- Katarsis (seri web) by Randolph Zaini

== Discography ==
=== Albums and Singles ===
- Unchained Melodies with Roy Orbison and the Royal Philharmonic Orchestra as the orchestral arranger (2018)
- The Beach Boys with the Royal Philharmonic Orchestra album as the orchestral arranger (2018)
- Nusantara with The Resonanz Children's Choir as the original composer (2018)
- Brata Main Title (Original Series Soundtrack) as the original composer (2018)
- Lokapala Main Theme (Original Game Soundtrack) as the original composer (2020)
- Nusantara with English title "Sing for our World" with Libera Choir as the original composer (2021)

=== Compositions ===
- Ballade for Steinway, an original composition as The Piano Brothers for Steinway and Sons (2015)
- Musical drama Suara Hati as the original song composer (2017)
- Sound of Indonesia TVC Campaign by Gudang Garam (2019)
- Apresiasi Bangsa TVC Campaign by Gudang Garam (2020)
- Pagelaran Sabang Merauke - Hikayat Nusantara by iforte and Bank Central Asia (2025)
