= Nobody Does It Like Me =

Studio album by Shirley Bassey
- Released: 1974
- Recorded: Record Plant, Los Angeles
- Genre: Vocal / MOR
- Label: United Artists
- Producer: George Butler

Shirley Bassey chronology
Live at Carnegie Hall (1973)	Nobody Does It Like Me (1974)	Live in Japan (1974)

Professional ratings
Review scores
Source	Rating
AllMusic	3.5/5 stars

Nobody Does It Like Me is a 1974 album by Shirley Bassey. Bassey's recordings had been selling well since 1970, scoring three top ten singles and three ten top albums. Nobody Does It Like Me was recorded with a new producer, George Butler, and brought a partial return to the traditional pop sound of Bassey's pre-1970s career. Here, the title track "Nobody Does It Like Me" and "When You Smile" harken back to the big band era. Bassey's soaring vocals on Paul Anka's "I'm Not Anyone" and the slightly funky "Morning in Your Eyes" contrast with a delicately rendered "Davy". The duet "Davy", recorded with the song's composer Benard Ighner, is one of the rare occasions that Bassey shared the credits with another vocalist; it was also issued as a single and hit #44 on the US Adult Contemporary chart. The album closes with Bassey's reading of Stevie Wonder's "You Are the Sunshine of My Life". This album failed to chart in the UK and peaked at #142 in the US. Her next two studio albums would be top 15 albums in the UK.

The original release was in stereo on vinyl and cassette. In 2006, BGO Records issued a remastered Nobody Does It Like Me and Love, Life and Feelings on a 2-CD set.

== Track listing ==
Side One.

1. "Leave a Little Room" (Michael Randall)
2. "When You Smile" (William Salter, Ralph MacDonald)
3. "All That Love Went to Waste" from the Motion Picture A Touch of Class (George Barrie, Sammy Cahn)
4. "Davy" (Benard Ighner)
5. "I'm Not Anyone" (Paul Anka, Johnny Harris)

Side Two.

1. "Morning in Your Eyes" (John Lehman, Ouida Lehman)
2. "The Trouble With Hello Is Goodbye" (Dave Grusin, Marilyn Bergman, Alan Bergman)
3. "Nobody Does It Like Me" from the Broadway musical Seesaw (Dorothy Fields, Cy Coleman)
4. "I'm Nothing Without You" (Jim Grady)
5. "You Are the Sunshine of My Life" (Stevie Wonder)

== Personnel ==
- Shirley Bassey – vocal
- Noel Rogers – musical consultant
- Gene Page – arranger, conductor (tracks 1, 4, 5, 6, 10)
- Nick Perito – arranger, conductor (tracks 2, 3, 7, 8, 9)
- James Jamerson – electric bass, (all tracks)
- Bernard Igher – background vocals (track 4)
- Arthur Greenslade and Horace Ott – conductor, strings and horns
- Bert Stern – photography
- Bob Cato – art direction
- Ria Lewerke – album design
