= Shirley Stops the Shows =

Studio album by Shirley Bassey
- Released: 1965
- Recorded: 1965
- Genre: Vocal
- Label: EMI/Columbia
- Producer: Norman Newell

Shirley Bassey chronology
Let's Face the Music (1962)	Shirley Stops the Shows (1965)	Shirley Bassey at the Pigalle (1965)

Shirley Bassey Belts the Best!
- US album cover

Professional ratings
Review scores
Source	Rating
Record Mirror	4/5 stars

Shirley Stops the Shows is the seventh Shirley Bassey studio album, her 5th and final studio album recorded for the EMI/Columbia label in the UK. Released in 1965, this album is a mix of standards and showtunes. Shirley Bassey was at a high point in her career, with worldwide success of her single "Goldfinger", but the album failed to chart in the UK, a first for her Columbia albums. The album met with more success in the US, reaching number 85 in the US Pop charts. For the US market it was issued with an alternative running order, retitled Shirley Bassey Belts the Best! and "The Lady Is a Tramp" was replaced by "Goldfinger". Original release was in mono and stereo, both mono versions feature an alternative studio recording of "People" which has not yet been re-issued on CD. The stereo version, remastered, was issued on CD in 2008 together with 12 of Those Songs by BGO Records.

== Track listing ==
Side One.

1. "Everything's Coming up Roses" (Jule Styne, Stephen Sondheim) – 3.22
2. "The Sweetest Sounds" (Richard Rodgers) – 2.38
3. "He Loves Me" (Jerry Bock, Sheldon Harnick) – 2.04
4. "I Believe in You" (Frank Loesser) – 2.13
5. "People" (Jule Styne, Bob Merrill) – 2.47
6. "The Lady is a Tramp" (Richard Rodgers, Lorenz Hart) – 2.55

Side Two.

1. "Once in a Lifetime" (Anthony Newley, Leslie Bricusse) – 2.20
2. "Something Wonderful" (Richard Rodgers, Oscar Hammerstein II) – 2.42
3. "A Lot of Livin' to Do" (Charles Strouse, Lee Adams) – 1.54
4. "If Ever I Would Leave You" (Alan Jay Lerner, Frederick Loewe) – 2.43
5. "Somewhere" (Stephen Sondheim, Leonard Bernstein) – 2.49
6. "I Could Have Danced All Night" (Lerner, Loewe) – 1.54

== Personnel ==
- Shirley Bassey – vocal
- Johnny Scott and his Orchestra – on track 4 and 10
- Tony Osborne and his Orchestra – on track 11
- Kenny Clayton and his Orchestra – on track 12
- Johnnie Spence and his Orchestra – on tracks all other tracks

== Charts ==
Chart peaks for Shirley Stops the Shows
Chart (1965)	Peak position
US Billboard Top LPs	85
