= Shirley Bassey (album) =

Studio album by Shirley Bassey
- Released: January 1962
- Genre: Vocal
- Length: 41:24
- Label: EMI/Columbia
- Producer: Norman Newell

Shirley Bassey chronology
Shirley (1961)	Shirley Bassey (1962)	Let's Face the Music (1962)

Professional ratings
Review scores
Source	Rating
AllMusic	4/5 stars
Uncut	3/5 stars

Shirley Bassey is the self-titled fifth studio album by Welsh singer Shirley Bassey, released in 1962. It is her third release with EMI/Columbia and was accompanied by Geoff Love and his orchestra and The Williams Singers (The Rita Williams Singers). The album spent eleven weeks on the charts, beginning in February 1962, and peaking at #14. This album was issued in mono and stereo. The stereo version of this album was released on CD in 1997 by EMI.

== Track listing ==
Side One.

1. "Love Is a Many Splendored Thing" (Paul Francis Webster, Sammy Fain) - 2.54
2. "The Nearness of You" (Ned Washington, Hoagy Carmichael) - 4.20
3. "Fools Rush In (Where Angels Fear to Tread)" (Rube Bloom, Johnny Mercer) - 2.51
4. "Who Are We?" (Paul Francis Webster, Jay Livingston) - 4.13
5. "Angel Eyes" (Matt Dennis, Earl Brent) - 3.20
6. "Till" (Charles Danvers, Carl Sigman, Pierre Buisson) - 3.58

Side Two.

1. "A Lovely Way to Spend an Evening" (Harold Adamson, Jimmy McHugh) - 3.21
2. "This Love of Mine" (Frank Sinatra, Sol Parker, Henry W. Sanicola) - 3.06
3. "You're Nearer" (Richard Rodgers, Lorenz Hart) - 2.39
4. "Goodbye Lover-Hello Friend" (Norman Newell, Michael Carr) - 3.52
5. "Where or When" (Richard Rodgers, Lorenz Hart) - 3.24
6. "Where Are You?" (Harold Adamson, Jimmy McHugh) - 3.16
7. "Climb Ev'ry Mountain" (Richard Rodgers, Oscar Hammerstein II) - 3.10

== Personnel ==
- Shirley Bassey – vocal
- The Williams Singers – vocal choir
- Geoff Love – arranger, conductor
- Geoff Love and his Orchestra – orchestra
