= All by Myself (Shirley Bassey album) =

Studio album by Shirley Bassey
- Released: 11 January 1982
- Label: Applause
- Producer: Johnny Harris

Shirley Bassey chronology
| The Magic Is You (1979) | All by Myself (1982) | I Am What I Am (1984) |

All by Myself is a 1982 album by Shirley Bassey. Having ended her contract with United Artists around 1980 (around the time that label was sold to Bassey's former home EMI), Bassey took a break from recording, and then began releasing albums on various labels. All by Myself was the first of these, issued on the Applause label. 1982 was the dawn of the CD era, and this was her first-ever album to be issued on CD. The album was also issued on LP and cassette. In the UK and some other countries, the album was titled Love Songs, with identical cover art, and under that name it charted for five weeks on the UK albums chart, on the K-tel label, peaking at #48. The original CD has since become scarce, though the songs have appeared on many compilations.

== Track listing ==
1. "All by Myself" (Rachmaninoff, Eric Carmen) - 4:05
2. "This Masquerade" (Leon Russell) - 5:08
3. "If and When" (Cyril Ornadel, Norman Newell) - 2:49
4. "He's Out of My Life" (Tom Bahler) - 2:55
5. "New York State of Mind" (Billy Joel) - 3:55
6. "Can You Read My Mind" (John Williams, Leslie Bricusse) - 3:09
7. "Only When I Laugh" (David Shire, Richard Maltby Jr.) - 3:12
8. "Solitaire" (Neil Sedaka, Phil Cody) - 4:42
9. New York Medley - 3:23
  - "New York, New York" (John Kander, Fred Ebb)
  - "New York, New York" (Gerard Kenny)
10. "We Don't Cry Out Loud" (Peter Allen, Carole Bayer Sager) - 4:09

== Singles ==
One single was issued from the original release of this album;

"All by Myself" / "We Don't Cry Out Loud" (Applause, APK 201)

== Personnel ==
- Shirley Bassey – vocals
- Johnny Harris – producer, musical director, arranger, conductor
- John Coleman – arranger (track 9)
- Tom Ranier – keyboards
- Paul Leim – drums
- Neil Stubenhaus – bass
- Joe de Blase, George Doering and Mitch Holder – guitar
