= Shirley Bassey at the Pigalle =

Live album by Shirley Bassey
- Released: 1965
- Recorded: 12 September 1965
- Genre: Vocal
- Label: EMI/Columbia
- Producer: Norman Newell

Shirley Bassey chronology
Shirley Stops the Shows (1965)	Shirley Bassey at the Pigalle (1965)	I've Got a Song for You (1966)

Alternative cover
- Canadian stereo release, similar to American mono release

Shirley Bassey at the Pigalle is Shirley Bassey's first live album, recorded on the opening night of an eight-week engagement at the Pigalle, a nightclub in the West End of London. This performance, on 12 September 1965, earned Bassey outstanding reviews. The album was released that same year. It was Bassey's final album for EMI's Columbia label.

The album went to #15 on the UK Albums Chart, making this her fifth album to chart in the top 15.

The album was released as In Person in the US, it apparently being believed that "The Pigalle" would be too obscure to Americans. There is also an alternative picture of her from this performance on the cover.

The Album was issued in mono and stereo. The stereo version of this album has been released twice on CD. Firstly by the EMI label Music For Pleasure in 1992 as Shirley Bassey Live!, a 2-CD set that also included Live at Carnegie Hall. A re-mastered release came in 2008 together with Live at Talk of the Town issued on a 2-CD set by BGO Records.

== Track listing ==
Side One.

1. "A Lovely Way to Spend an Evening" (Jimmy McHugh, Harold Adamson) (orchestra only)
2. "On a Wonderful Day Like Today" (Leslie Bricusse, Anthony Newley)
3. "I Get a Kick Out of You" (Cole Porter)
4. "Who Can I Turn To?" (Leslie Bricusse, Anthony Newley)
5. "You'd Better Love Me" (Hugh Martin, Timothy Gray)
6. "The Other Woman" (Jessie Mae Robinson, Small)
7. "He Loves Me" (Jerry Bock, Sheldon Harnick)
8. "With These Hands" (Benny Davis, Abner Silver)
9. "A Lot of Living to Do" (Charles Strouse, Lee Adams)
10. "I (Who Have Nothing)" (Mogol, Donida, Jerry Leiber, Mike Stoller)

Side Two.

1. "La Bamba" (Traditional; arranged by Alyn Ainsworth)
2. "You Can Have Him" (Irving Berlin)
3. "The Second Time Around" (Sammy Cahn, Jimmy Van Heusen)
4. "The Lady Is a Tramp" (Richard Rodgers, Lorenz Hart)
5. "Somewhere" (Leonard Bernstein, Stephen Sondheim)
6. "On a Wonderful Day Like Today" (Leslie Bricusse, Anthony Newley)
7. "A Lovely Way to Spend an Evening" (Jimmy McHugh, Harold Adamson) (orchestra only)

== Personnel ==
- Shirley Bassey – vocal
- Alyn Ainsworth and his Orchestra – orchestra
