= The Bond Collection =

Studio album by Shirley Bassey
- Released: 1992
- Recorded: 1987
- Genre: MOR
- Label: Icon
- Producer: Tony Clarke

Shirley Bassey chronology
Keep the Music Playing (1991)	The Bond Collection (1992)	Sings the Songs of Andrew Lloyd Webber (1993)

Bassey Sings Bond
- Issued on Tring Records

The Bond Collection, a.k.a. Bassey Sings Bond, is a 1987 studio album by Shirley Bassey, notable for having been released without the artist's consent and subsequently withdrawn from sales by court order.

== History ==
In early 1987, Bassey announced that she was planning to record an album of James Bond themes. The album was due for release 1987 to celebrate the 25th anniversary of the first James Bond feature film Dr. No. She promoted the album on the television show Live At The Palladium on May 3, 1987, where she lip-synched "A View to a Kill" and also performed a James Bond medley.

Bassey decided not to release the album, for reasons that remain unclear (it is believed that she was not satisfied with the quality of the recording). However, five years later, the album was released, against Bassey's wishes, by the ICON Records label on September 20, 1992, as The Bond Collection, and again by TRING Records on January 10, 1994, as Bassey Sings Bond. Bassey sued in court, and on May 5, 1995, a permanent injunction was obtained against Icon Entertainment to prevent further manufacture or sales of the album. All existing unsold copies were withdrawn from sale, and the CDs are considered scarce. No singles were issued from this album.

Another album, Bassey Sings Bond, was recorded for EMI, featuring new recordings of Bond songs. It was to be released at the end of 2002. However, this project incurred problems shortly after recording, and it has not been released. However, the vocal performance of "You Only Live Twice" recorded for this album was remixed in 2007 for the album Get the Party Started.

== Track listing ==
1. "A View to a Kill" (Duran Duran, John Barry) (from the 1985 A View to a Kill soundtrack, original recording by Duran Duran)
2. "Nobody Does It Better" (Marvin Hamlisch, Carole Bayer Sager) (from the 1977 The Spy Who Loved Me soundtrack, original recording by Carly Simon)
3. "From Russia with Love" (Lionel Bart) (from the 1963 From Russia With Love soundtrack, original recording by Matt Monro)
4. "We Have All the Time in the World" (John Barry, Hal David) (from the 1969 On Her Majesty's Secret Service soundtrack, original recording by Louis Armstrong)
5. "You Only Live Twice" (John Barry, Leslie Bricusse) (from the 1967 You Only Live Twice soundtrack, original recording by Nancy Sinatra)
6. "Diamonds Are Forever" (Don Black, John Barry) (from the 1971 Diamonds Are Forever soundtrack, original recording by Shirley Bassey)
7. "Live and Let Die" (Paul McCartney, Linda McCartney) (from the 1973 Live and Let Die soundtrack, original recording by Paul McCartney & Wings)
8. "Moonraker" (John Barry, Hal David) (from the 1979 Moonraker soundtrack, original recording by Shirley Bassey)
9. "For Your Eyes Only" (Bill Conti, Mick Leeson) (from the 1981 For Your Eyes Only soundtrack, original recording by Sheena Easton)
10. "All Time High" (John Barry, Tim Rice) (from the 1983 Octopussy soundtrack, original recording by Rita Coolidge)
11. "Thunderball" (Don Black, John Barry) (from the 1965 Thunderball soundtrack, original recording by Tom Jones)
12. "Goldfinger" (John Barry, Leslie Bricusse, Anthony Newley) (from the 1964 Goldfinger soundtrack, original recording by Shirley Bassey)
