= I Am What I Am (Shirley Bassey album) =

Studio album by Shirley Bassey
- Released: October 1984
- Genre: MOR
- Label: Towerbell
- Producer: Norman Newell

Shirley Bassey chronology
| All By Myself (1982) | I Am What I Am (1984) | La Mujer (1989) |

I Am What I Am was the only studio album recorded by Shirley Bassey for the Towerbell Records label. Several other tracks were also recorded at this label and issued as singles only. The recording sessions took place at Olympic Studios, Barnes, London, in July and August 1984. Following the success of the previous album All by Myself, this album peaked at number 25 in the UK album chart and reached Gold status. This release was the first digitally recorded album made by Shirley Bassey and was issued on vinyl, cassette and CD. Consisting of mainly re-recordings from Shirley Bassey's back catalogue and two new songs, this album was recorded 'live' with The London Symphony Orchestra, conducted by Carl Davies. The album also reunited Shirley Bassey with Norman Newell, who had served successfully as her producer throughout the 1960s.

Towerbell Records is now defunct but this album has been re-issued on CD many times on various labels.

Several of the vocal performances made for this recording were remixed for the 2007 album Get the Party Started.

== Track listing ==
1. "What Now My Love" (Gilbert Bécaud, Pierre Leroyer, Carl Sigman)
2. "Something" (George Harrison)
3. "As Long as He Needs Me" (Lionel Bart)
4. "Kiss Me Honey Honey" (Al Timothy, Michael Julien)
5. "As I Love You" (Jay Livingston, Ray Evans)
6. "Big Spender" (Cy Coleman, Dorothy Fields)
7. "Send in the Clowns" (Stephen Sondheim)
8. "I Am What I Am" (Jerry Herman)
9. "Goldfinger" (Leslie Bricusse, Anthony Newley, John Barry)
10. "I (Who Have Nothing)" (Mogol, Donida, Jerry Leiber, Mike Stoller)
11. "Natalie" (U. Balsamo, Norman Newell)
12. "And I Love You So" (Don McLean)
13. "Never, Never, Never" (Tony Renis, Alberto Testa, Norman Newell)
14. "For All We Know" (Fred Karlin, Arthur James)
15. "This Is My Life" (Norman Newell, Bruno Canfora, Antonio Amum)
16. "If You Don't Understand" (Toto Cutugno, Norman Newell) - 4:10 (This track did not appear on the original issue of the album and is from a different recording session without the London Symphony Orchestra)

Bonus Track

The Japanese LP issue featured a bonus track: "To All the Men I've Loved Before" (Albert Hammond, Hal David) but the Japan CD release did not include this track.

== Singles ==
Four singles were issued from the original release of this album.

- "If You Don't Understand" / "To All the Men I've Loved Before" Ariola Records, Germany only)
- "Natalie" / "As I Love You" (Towerbell Records)
- "I Am What I Am" / "This Is My Life" (Towerbell Records)
- "To All the Men I've Loved Before" / "I Am What I Am" (Towerbell Records) UK #86

1984 a Towerbell/Vogue maxi-single was issued with a "Special Dance Mix" of "If You Don't Understand" (re-mix by Robert Levy-Provençal) - 7:11
