= Shirley Bassey Sings the Movies =

Sings the Movies

Studio album by Shirley Bassey
- Released: 1995
- Recorded: 1995
- Genre: MOR
- Label: PolyGramTV
- Producer: Pip Williams

Shirley Bassey chronology
Sings the Songs of Andrew Lloyd Webber (1993)	Sings the Movies (1995)	The Show Must Go On (1996)

Sings the Movies is a studio album by Shirley Bassey, released in 1995.

== Background ==
In 1995, Bassey signed a deal with the PolyGram TV label, recording and releasing two albums with the label. The first was Sings the Movies, a themed album of movie songs. The songs were personally selected by Bassey for the album, and are a diverse range of ballads and pop classics; some were originally composed for original soundtracks, but several were classic songs that appeared in successful movies. One re-recording was made for the album: the classic James Bond theme "Goldfinger". This is the fourth studio recording of the song by Bassey.

Several TV performances were made by Bassey to promote the album and British television broadcast a successful commercial campaign. The album sold well across Europe and entered the UK Albums Chart on November 11, 1995 for a run of nine weeks, peaking at No. 24, and earning a gold disc.

No singles were released from the album.

== Track listing ==
1. "Goldfinger" (John Barry, Leslie Bricusse, Anthony Newley) from the movie Goldfinger
2. "Crazy" (Willie Nelson) from the movie Coal Miner's Daughter
3. "Arthur's Theme (Best That You Can Do)" (Christopher Cross, Burt Bacharach, Carole Bayer Sager, Peter Allen) from the film Arthur
4. "Love on the Rocks" (Neil Diamond, Gilbert Bécaud) from the movie The Jazz Singer
5. "Eleanor Rigby" (Paul McCartney, John Lennon) from the movie Yellow Submarine
6. "Let's Stay Together" (Al Green) from the movie Pulp Fiction
7. "The Rose" (Amanda McBroom) from the movie The Rose
8. "We Don't Need Another Hero" (Terry Britten, Graham Lyle) from the movie Mad Max Beyond Thunderdome
9. "Do You Know Where You're Going To" (Michael Masser, Gerald Goffin) from the movie Mahogany
10. "It Must Have Been Love" (Per Gessle) from the movie Pretty Woman
11. "Try a Little Tenderness" (Irving King, Harry M. Woods) from the movie The Commitments
12. "Hopelessly Devoted to You" (John Farrar) from the movie Grease
13. "Makin' Whoopee" (Walter Donaldson, Gus Kahn) from the movie Sleepless in Seattle
14. "Who Wants to Live Forever" (Brian May) from the movie Highlander
