= Shirley Bassey =

Welsh singer (born 1937)

Dame Shirley Bassey CH DBE
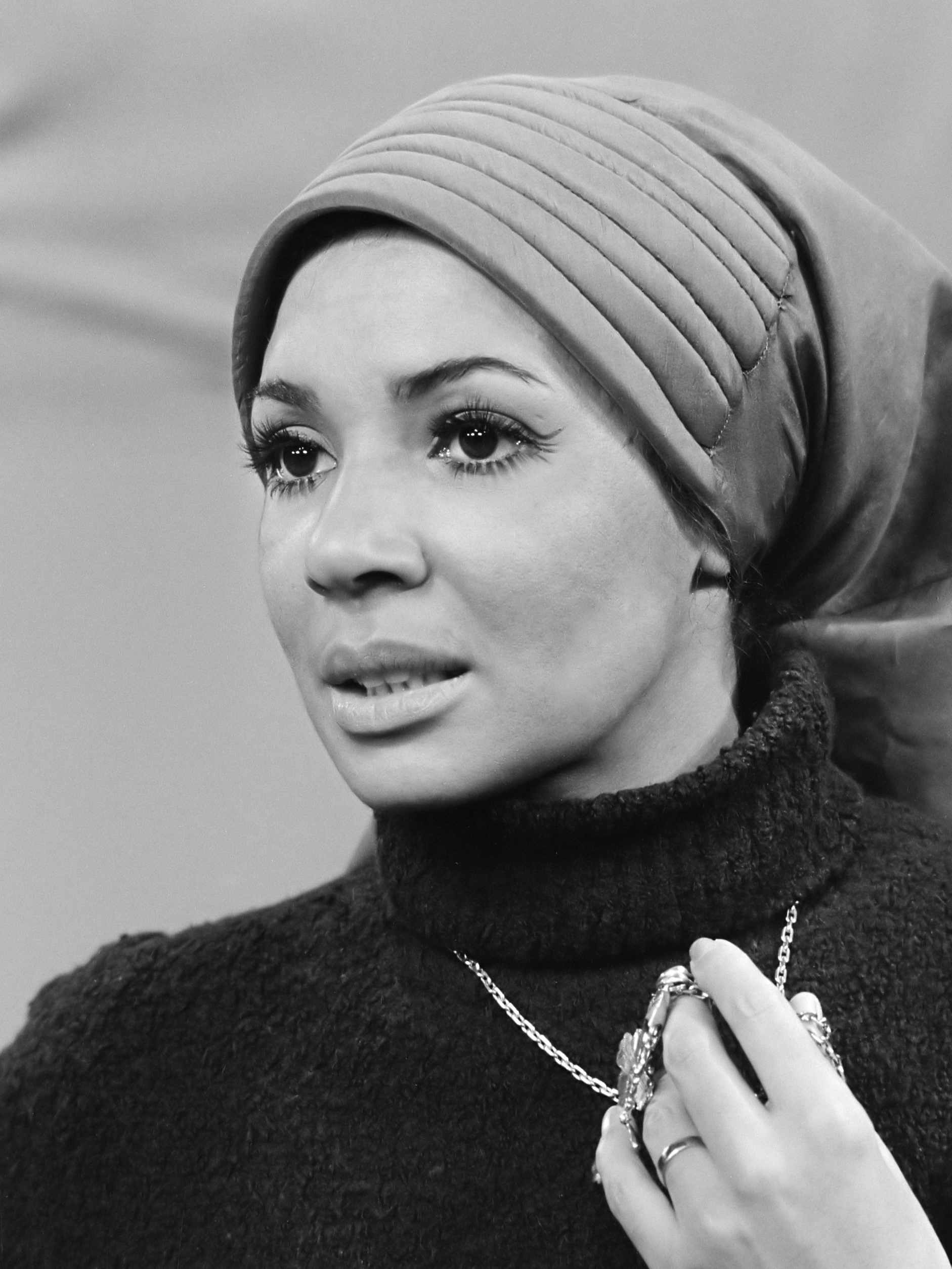
- Bassey in 1971

Background information
- Born: Shirley Veronica Bassey; 8 January 1937 (age 89); Cardiff, Wales
- Genres: R&B; pop; jazz; soul
- Occupations: Singer; songwriter
- Years active: 1953–present
- Labels: Philips; Columbia; Decca; United Artists; Geffen

Dame Shirley Veronica Bassey (/ˈbæsi/; born 8 January 1937) is a Welsh singer. Known for her powerful voice, Bassey recorded the theme songs to three James Bond films—the only artist to perform more than one officially. Bassey is one of the most popular vocalists in Britain. In a career spanning more than 70 years, Bassey has sold more than 140 million records worldwide, making her one of the best-selling female artists of all time. She is the first woman in history to claim a Top 40 album in seven consecutive decades in the United Kingdom.

Born in Cardiff, Bassey began performing as a teenager in 1953. In 1959, she became the first Welsh singer to gain a no. 1 single on the UK singles chart. In the following decades, Bassey amassed 27 top 40 hits in the UK, including two no. 1s ("As I Love You" and the double A-side "Climb Ev'ry Mountain"/"Reach for the Stars") plus a no. 1 in the Dance Chart ("History Repeating"). She became well known for recording theme songs of the James Bond films Goldfinger (1964), Diamonds Are Forever (1971) and Moonraker (1979).

Bassey has had numerous BBC television specials and hosted her own variety series, Shirley Bassey. In 2011, BBC aired the television film Shirley, based on Bassey's life and career. Since making her first appearance at the Royal Albert Hall in 1971, she has performed at the venue 45 times. Bassey received the first award for Best British Female Solo Artist at the 1st Brit Awards in 1977. She was appointed a Dame in 1999 for services to the performing arts. In 2003, she was ranked among the "100 Great Black Britons". Her song "Goldfinger" was inducted into the Grammy Hall of Fame in 2008. She has influenced other singers, and was a favourite of Aretha Franklin.

== Early life ==
Shirley Veronica Bassey was born the sixth and youngest child of Henry Bassey and Eliza Jane Start on Bute Street in Tiger Bay, Cardiff. She grew up in the nearby community of Splott. Her father was Nigerian and her English mother came from New Marske, North Yorkshire.

Two of her mother's four children from previous relationships lived in the Bassey household. Bassey's mother listed her first husband, Alfred Metcalfe, as her own father in the registry of her marriage to Henry Bassey, giving rise to speculation that this marriage was bigamous in the absence of a prior divorce. Eliza and Henry's second child died in infancy, so Shirley was born into a household of three sisters, two half-sisters and one brother.

Teachers and students alike at Moorland Road School noticed Bassey's strong voice but gave the pre-teen little encouragement: "everyone told me to shut up. Even in the school choir the teacher kept telling me to back off till I was singing in the corridor!" A classmate recalled her singing the refrain "Can't Help Lovin' Dat Man" from Show Boat with such feeling that she made their teacher uncomfortable. She left Splott secondary modern school at age 14 to work at Curran Steels and, in the evenings and weekends, to sing in local pubs and clubs.

== Career ==
=== 1950s ===
In 1953, Bassey signed her first professional contract, touring with the variety show Memories of Jolson, a musical based on the life of Al Jolson. On 17 December 1953, Bassey signed a contract with Columbia Productions for two performances at the salary of £10. Her next professional engagement was in the touring show Hot from Harlem, in which she and other mixed-race Cardiff performers played Black Americans in 1954. A review of the show in March 1954 included: "Shirley Bassey, an attractive young singer, is an asset to the show." Later that year, Bassey gave birth to her daughter Sharon, while staying with her sister Ella in London.

While performing in Jersey, Bassey met her first manager, Mike Sullivan. In 1955, Bassey toured various theatres until she was noticed by the impresario Jack Hylton at the Astor Club in September 1955. He invited her to feature in Al Read's Such Is Life, which opened on 14 December 1955 at the Adelphi Theatre in London's West End. In the show, which ran until 3 November 1956, she featured the song "Burn My Candle", leading one reviewer to say that she had nearly stopped the show with the song "which brought outraged mutters, then roars of shamefaced applause." During the show's run, Philips record producer Johnny Franz spotted her on television, was impressed and offered her a recording deal. Bassey recorded her first single, "Burn My Candle", the song she had featured in Such is Life; it was released in February 1956. The cabaret-style song was banned by the BBC because the lyrics were considered too suggestive. More singles followed and in February 1957, Bassey had her first hit with "The Banana Boat Song", which reached no. 8 in the UK Singles Chart.

Following a successful run at the Café de Paris, London, Bassey made her American stage début in Las Vegas at El Rancho Vegas in February 1957. Following on from Las Vegas, Bassey opened at Ciro's on Sunset Boulevard in West Hollywood on 15 February 1957. She also recorded under the direction of American producer Mitch Miller in New York City for the Columbia Records label (which at the time had a distribution deal with Philips), producing the single "If I Had a Needle and Thread" backed with "Tonight My Heart She Is Crying". On her return to the UK in April 1957, she starred in "Sunday Night at the London Palladium" for the first time on 28 April 1957.

In mid-1958, Bassey recorded two singles that would become classics in the Bassey catalogue. "As I Love You" was released as the B-side of another ballad, "Hands Across the Sea"; it did not sell well at first but, after another appearance at the London Palladium on 30 November, sales began to pick up. In January 1959, "As I Love You" reached no. 1 and stayed there for four weeks; it was the first chart-topping single by a Welsh artist. While "As I Love You" climbed the charts, so did Bassey's recording of "Kiss Me, Honey Honey, Kiss Me" and both records would end up occupying the top 3 at the same time. Having been with Decca Records for four years, Bassey then signed to EMI's Columbia label on 20 April 1959. Her first album for Columbia, The Fabulous Shirley Bassey, was later released and reached no. 12 in the UK Albums Chart.

=== 1960s ===
Between 1960 and 1961, Bassey had four Top 10 hits in the UK. Her 1960 recording of "As Long As He Needs Me", from Lionel Bart's Oliver!, peaked at no. 2 and had a chart run of 30 weeks. She made her American television début on 13 November 1960, when she performed on The Ed Sullivan Show. In 1961, the double A-side "Reach for the Stars"/"Climb Ev'ry Mountain" reached no. 1. Bassey's version of "As Long as He Needs Me" reached no. 2. Her single "I'll Get By" peaked at no. 10. Bassey's rendition of "You'll Never Know" was one of the UK's top hits in 1961, reaching no. 6 in the charts. She began to gain recognition in the American market and signed to United Artists Records in August 1961. The following month she began a five-week engagement at the Persian Room inside New York's Plaza Hotel.

Bassey's collaboration with Nelson Riddle and his orchestra, the album Let's Face the Music (1962), reached no. 12 in the UK album chart; and the single, "What Now My Love" made it to no. 5 in 1962. Her cover version of the Ben E. King hit "I (Who Have Nothing)" reached no. 6 in 1963. In January 1963, Bassey performed at a gala commemorating the second anniversary of President John F. Kennedy's inauguration in Washington, D.C. In March 1963, she appeared on the cover of Ebony magazine. Bassey made her Carnegie Hall debut on 15 February 1964. The complete concert recording was not released until it was included in the EMI compilation The EMI/UA Years 1959–1979 in 1994.

In 1965, Bassey enjoyed her only Top 40 hit on the Billboard Hot 100 with the title song of the James Bond film, Goldfinger. The single "Goldfinger" was released in the US in January 1965, peaking at No 8. The original soundtrack for Goldfinger hit no. 1 in the US that year. The "Goldfinger" theme song had a lasting impact on her career. In the sleeve notes for Bassey's 25th Anniversary Album (1978), Peter Clayton noted that: "Acceptance in America was considerably helped by the enormous popularity of ("Goldfinger")...But she had actually established herself there as early as 1961, in cabaret in New York. She was also a success in Las Vegas...'I suppose I should feel hurt that I've never been really big in America on record since "Goldfinger"...But, concertwise, I always sell out.'..."

Her live 1965 album Shirley Bassey at the Pigalle, recorded during a sold-out run at the Pigalle in London, peaked at no. 15 in the UK album chart. Also in 1965, she sang the title song for the James Bond spoof The Liquidator. Bassey recorded a song for the next Bond film, Thunderball (1965). "Mr Kiss Kiss Bang Bang" was not used in the movie, although the film's score follows its melodic theme. Written by John Barry and Leslie Bricusse, "Mr Kiss Kiss Bang Bang" was re-recorded by American singer Dionne Warwick. This song was rejected in favour of a new one, "Thunderball", hastily written by Barry and given to Welsh singer Tom Jones after the film's producers decided the song over the opening credits must feature the film's title.

In the aftermath of "Goldfinger" her UK sales started to falter as well: only two of her singles would enter the UK top 40 from 1966 to 1970. Her first album on United Artists, "I've Got a Song for You" (1966), spent one week in the charts. From 1966 to 1970, only two albums would chart, one of those a compilation. One of her best-known singles, "Big Spender" was released in 1967, charting just short of the UK top 20.

Bassey began to live as a tax exile in 1968, during a period of very high income tax, and was unable to work in Britain for almost two years. In 1969, she appeared in NBC's The Spring Thing, a musical television special hosted by Bobbie Gentry and Noel Harrison. Guests included were Goldie Hawn, Meredith MacRae, Irwin C. Watson, Rod McKuen and Harpers Bizarre.

=== 1970s ===
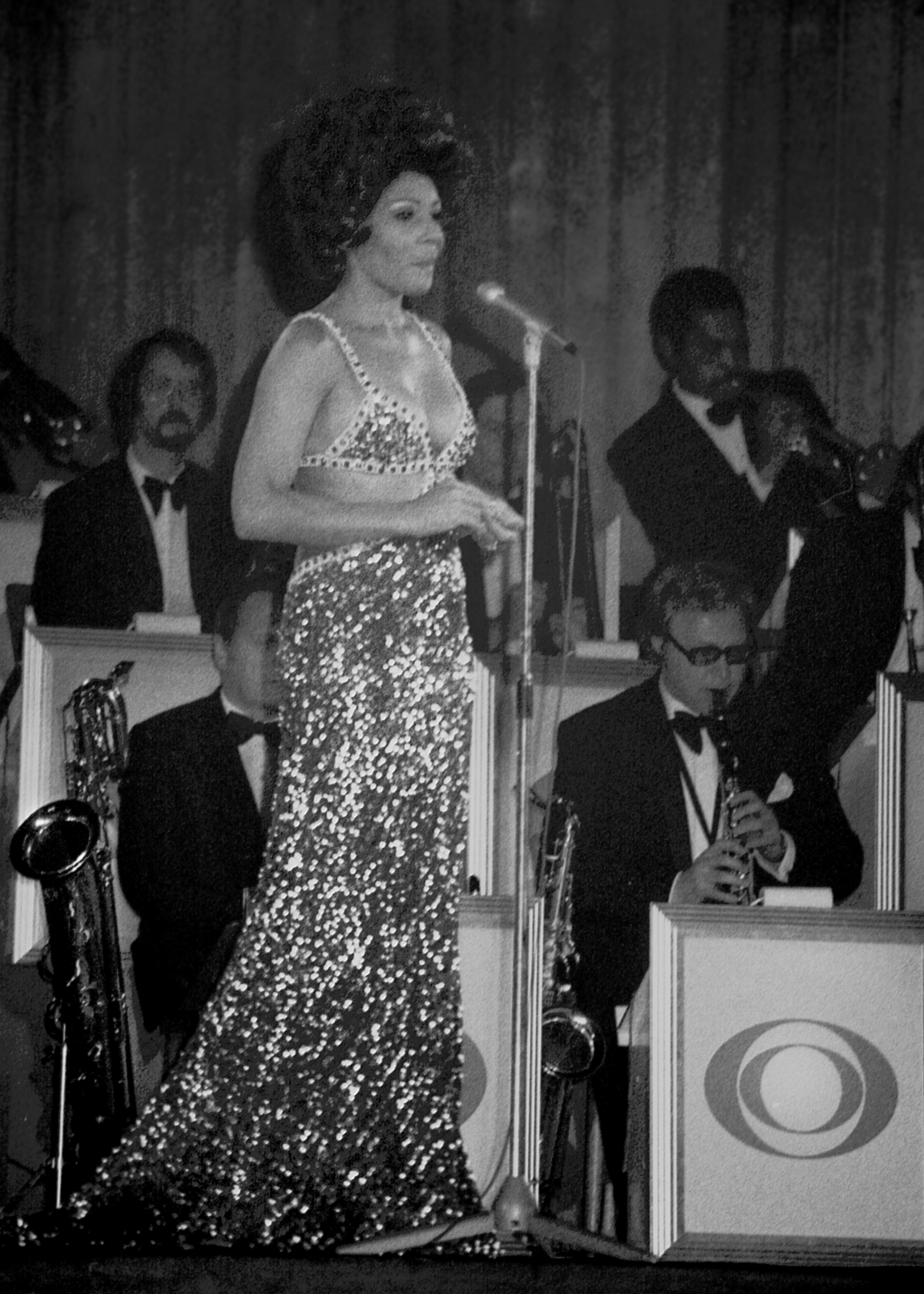
Bassey performing in West Germany in 1973

Bassey's UK comeback came in 1970 leading to one of the most successful periods of her career. Starting the year with a BBC Television 'Special', The Young Generation Meet Shirley Bassey, recorded in Sweden and shown on BBC1 on 18 March. She returned to the UK with a record-breaking run of performances at the Talk of the Town nightclub. Also in 1970, she released the album Something, which marked a stylistic shift for her, as producer/arranger Johnny Harris built on her traditional pop roots by incorporating more contemporary material and arrangements. The title single became one of her biggest UK hits, reaching no. 4 (the same peak as the Beatles’ version) and staying in the charts for 22 weeks – one of her longest chart runs. However, Bassey continued to record standards, show tunes and torch songs throughout her career.

Her song "Something" was also a top-10 US hit in the Adult Contemporary chart. Other singles of this period included the hit "Never Never Never", an English version of the Italian "Grande grande grande", reaching the top 10 in the US Adult Contemporary Chart, the UK top 10 and no. 1 in Australia and South Africa. In 1972, "For All We Know" won The Best Female Performance Of The Year at The Radio Luxembourg Awards.

Returning to the James Bond franchise, she recorded the theme song for Diamonds Are Forever (1971). Bassey appeared on the Morecambe and Wise Christmas Show, broadcast on Christmas Day in 1971.

Bassey was the subject of This Is Your Life on two occasions: firstly, in November 1972 when Eamonn Andrews surprised her at Heathrow Airport, and then in January 1993, when Michael Aspel surprised her at the curtain call of a sell-out concert at the Royal Albert Hall.

Bassey recorded a series of successful albums on the United Artists label, including: Something Else (1971); And I Love You So (1972); I Capricorn (1972); Never Never Never (1973); Good, Bad but Beautiful (1975); Love, Life and Feelings (1976); You Take My Heart Away (1977) and Yesterdays (1978). Additionally, two of Bassey's earlier LPs also entered the charts in the '70s: And We Were Lovers (1967, re-issued as Big Spender) and Let's Face the Music (1962, re-issued as What Now My Love). Two compilations, The Shirley Bassey Singles Album (1975) and 25th Anniversary Album (1978), both made the top three of the UK charts: The Shirley Bassey Singles Album, her highest-charting album, reached no. 2 and earned a gold disc; the 25th Anniversary Album eventually went platinum.

Between 1970 and 1979, Bassey had 18 hit albums in the UK Albums Chart. Her album The Magic Is You (1979) featured a portrait by the photographer Francesco Scavullo. In 1973, her sold-out concerts at New York's Carnegie Hall were recorded and released as a two-LP set, Shirley Bassey: Live at Carnegie Hall; this album reached no. 20 on the Billboard R&B album chart.

In 1976, Bassey starred in the six-episode Shirley Bassey show, the first of her television programmes for the BBC, followed by a second series of six episodes in 1979. The final show of the first series was nominated for the Golden Rose of Montreux in 1977. The series featured guests including Neil Diamond, Michel Legrand, the Three Degrees and Dusty Springfield and featured Bassey in various international locations as well as in the television studio. In 1978, Bassey pleaded guilty to being drunk and disorderly "after shouting abuse in the street and pushing a policeman". In 1979, Bassey recorded the title theme song for the Bond film, Moonraker.

=== 1980s ===
Throughout most of the 1980s, Bassey focused on charitable work and performing occasional concert tours throughout Europe, Australia and the United States. She had ended her contract with United Artists, whose former record division was now part of EMI, and began what she referred to as "semi-retirement". Bassey recorded an album entitled All by Myself (1982) and made a TV special for Thames Television called A Special Lady with guest Robert Goulet. Around this time she recorded a duet with the French film actor Alain Delon, "Thought I'd Ring You" (1983). Bassey was now recording far less often but an album of her most famous songs, I Am What I Am (1984), was recorded with the London Symphony Orchestra (LSO) conducted by Carl Davis. This was followed by a single and video to support the London Tourist Board, "There's No Place Like London" (1986), which was co-written by Lynsey de Paul and Gerard Kenny. A promotional video was released which included guest appearances by David Frost, Spike Milligan, Michael Caine and Frank Bruno. She recorded an album of James Bond themes, The Bond Collection in 1987, but was apparently unhappy with the results so she declined to release it. (Five years later it was released anyway, Bassey took legal action and all unsold copies were withdrawn.)

Bassey provided vocals for Swiss artists Yello on "The Rhythm Divine" (1987), a song co-written by Scottish singer Billy Mackenzie. An album sung entirely in Spanish, La Mujer was released in 1989.

=== 1990s ===
Bassey had started working with a vocal coach, a former opera singer, and her album Keep the Music Playing (1991) displayed a grand, operatic pop style on several songs (perhaps also influenced by her album with the LSO seven years earlier).

EMI released the five-CD box set Bassey – The EMI/UA Years 1959–1979 in 1994. The accompanying booklet opened with a poem by Marc Almond. Bassey collaborated with Chris Rea in the film La Passione (1996), appearing in the film as herself and releasing the single "'Disco' La Passione". The remix of this single charted just outside the UK top 40. Bassey's "History Repeating" (1997), written for her by the Propellerheads, reached no. 1 in the UK Dance Chart and no. 10 in the US Dance Chart. The liner notes of the Propellerheads' album Decksandrumsandrockandroll included the lines: "We would like to extend our maximum respect to Shirley Bassey for honouring us with her performance. We are still in shock...." Bassey celebrated her 60th birthday in 1997 with two open-air concerts, at Castle Howard and Althorp Park, and another TV special. The resulting live album The Birthday Concert received a Grammy Award nomination for Best Traditional Pop Vocal Performance. On 7 October 1998 in Egypt, Bassey performed at an open-air concert close to the Sphinx ofr charity and the Great Pyramid. Bassey played the Friday night at Henley Festival in 1984.

Bassey was sued in a breach of contract case in 1998 by her former personal assistant, who also accused Bassey of hitting her and making an ethnic slur. Bassey won the case. The episode was lampooned by Alexander Baron in his one-act play The Trial of Shirley Bassey. The following year, she performed the official song for the rugby World Cup, "World in Union", with Bryn Terfel at the opening ceremony at The Millennium Stadium, Cardiff, wearing a gown based on the Welsh flag. Their single made the top 40 and Bassey contributed two more songs to the official album Land of My Fathers, which reached no. 1 in the UK compilations chart and went silver.

=== 2000s ===
Bassey continued to perform at various high-profile events. In 2001, she was the principal artist at the Duke of Edinburgh's 80th birthday celebration. On 3 June 2002, she was one of a line-up of artists including Elton John, Paul McCartney and Tom Jones who performed at the Queen's 50th Jubilee Party at Buckingham Palace.

Bassey celebrated 50 years in show business in 2003 with the release of the CD Thank You for the Years, which was another top 20 album. A gala charity auction of her stage costumes at Christie's, "Dame Shirley Bassey: 50 Years of Glittering Gowns", raised £250,000 (US$500,000) for the Dame Shirley Bassey Scholarship at the Royal Welsh College of Music and Drama and the Noah's Ark Children's Hospital Appeal. Bassey topped the bill at the 2005 Royal Variety Performance, introducing her new song "The Living Tree".

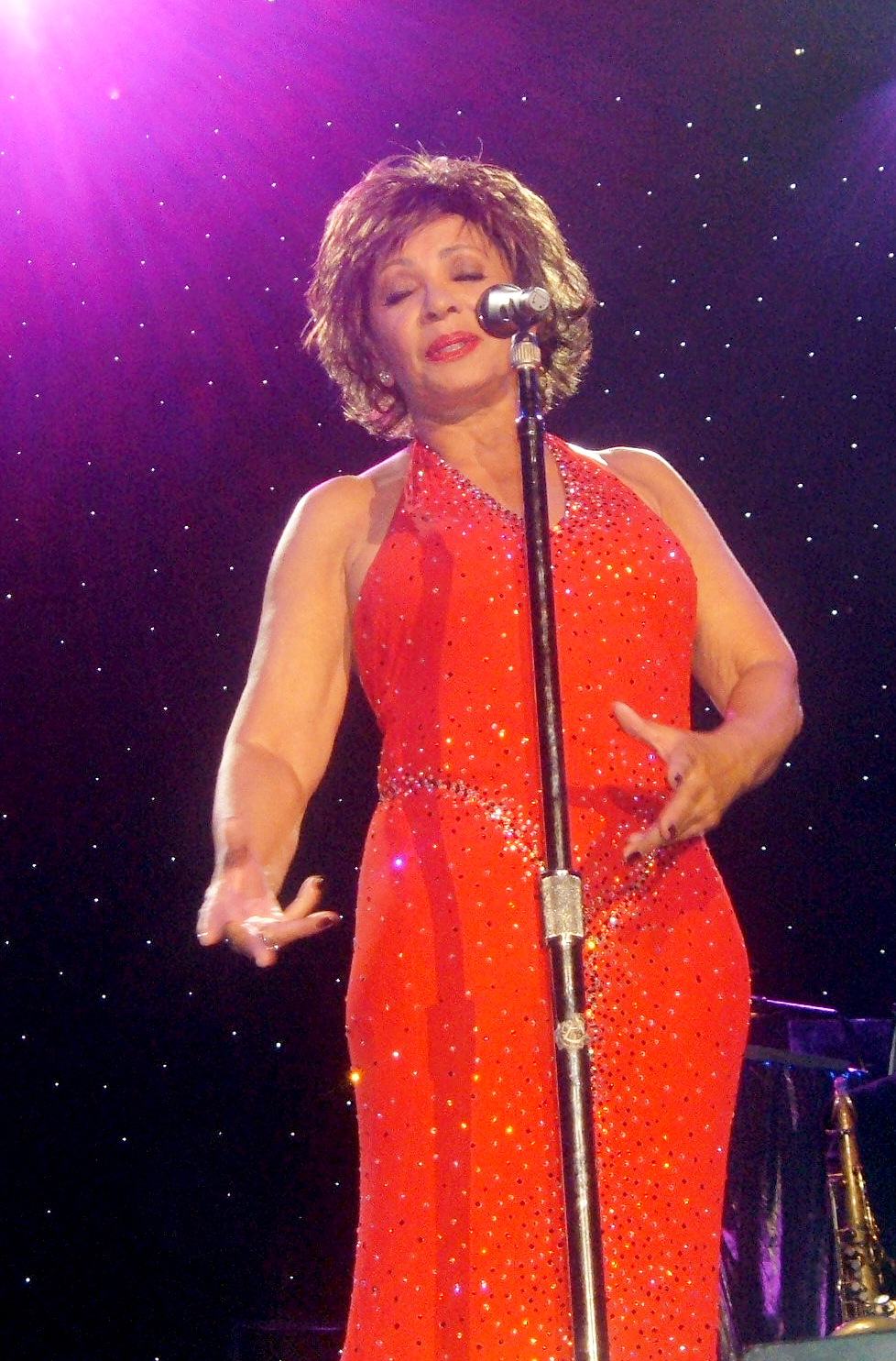
Bassey at Wembley Arena in 2006

Two popular Audiences with Shirley Bassey have aired on British television: one in 1995, which attracted more than 10 million viewers in the UK, and a second, broadcast in 2006. Bassey returned to perform in five arenas around the UK in June the same year, culminating at Wembley. She also performed a concert in front of 10,000 people at the Bryn Terfel Faenol Festival in North Wales broadcast by BBC Wales. Marks & Spencer signed her for their Christmas 2006 James Bond–style television advertising campaign. Bassey was seen in a glamorous ice palace singing a cover version of Pink's song "Get the Party Started", wearing an M&S gown.

"The Living Tree", written, produced and originally recorded by the group Never the Bride, was released as a single on 23 April 2007. It marked Bassey's 50th anniversary in the UK Singles Chart and earned the record for the longest span of top-40 hits in UK chart history. Bassey performed a 45-minute set at the 2007 Glastonbury Festival wearing a pink Julien Macdonald dress and customised Wellington boots. A new album, Get the Party Started, was subsequently released on 25 June 2007 and entered the UK Albums Chart at no. 6. The single of the title song reached no. 3 on the US Dance Chart. The same year, Bassey performed "Big Spender" with Elton John at his annual White Tie and Tiara Ball to raise money for The Elton John AIDS Foundation. In 2007, Bassey performed in Fashion Rocks in aid of The Prince's Trust at the Royal Albert Hall.

Bassey was rushed to the hospital in Monaco on 23 May 2008 to have an emergency operation on her stomach after complaining of abdominal pains. She was forced to pull out of the Nelson Mandela 90th Birthday Tribute concert because of her illness. A biography of Bassey, Diamond Diva, was published in 2008.

Bassey recorded the album The Performance (2009), with James Bond composer David Arnold as producer. A number of artists wrote songs expressly for her, including Manic Street Preachers, Gary Barlow, Tom Baxter, KT Tunstall, Pet Shop Boys, Nick Hodgson of the Kaiser Chiefs, John Barry and Don Black. Bassey headlined at the BBC Electric Proms on 23 October 2009, in her only complete live set of 2009. She sang several of the new songs from the album in November 2009 on several TV shows: The Graham Norton Show, The Paul O'Grady Show and as the guest singer on Strictly Come Dancing.

=== 2010s ===
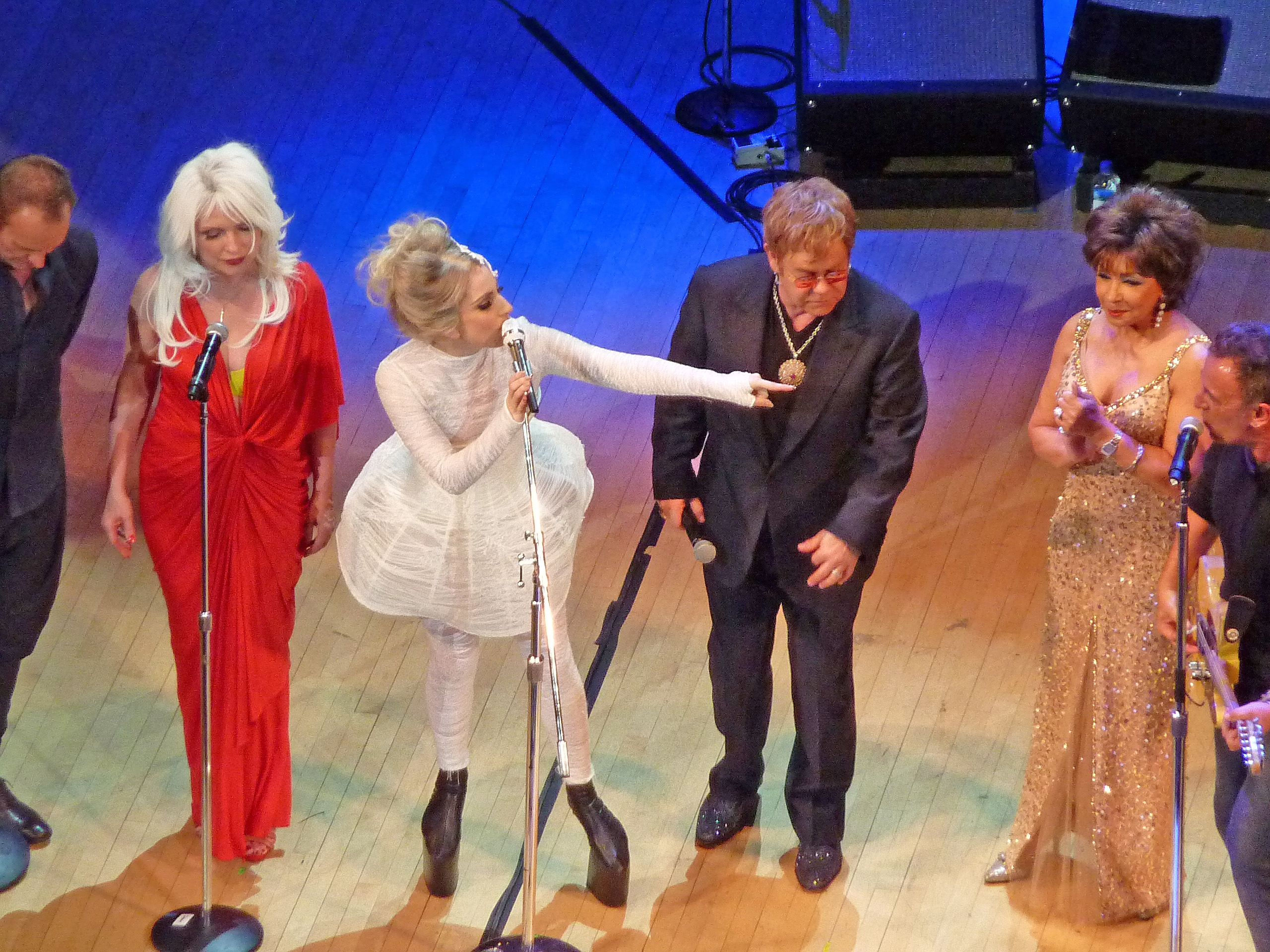
From left to right: Sting, Debbie Harry, Lady Gaga, Elton John, Bassey and Bruce Springsteen at Carnegie Hall in 2010

Bassey performed at a gala celebrating the 80th birthday of Mikhail Gorbachev on 30 March 2011. She also performed at the Classical Brit Awards in 2011, singing "Goldfinger" in tribute to John Barry.

The BBC broadcast a 70-minute drama entitled Shirley on 29 September 2011, depicting Bassey's early life and career. Ruth Negga played the title role. Bassey was one of the line-up of artists on 4 June 2012 who performed at the Queen's 60th Jubilee Party at Buckingham Palace, singing "Diamonds Are Forever". She performed at the 2013 Academy Awards on 24 February 2013 to commemorate the 50th anniversary of the James Bond movie franchise. It was her first appearance at an Oscars ceremony as a performer. She sang "Goldfinger" to a standing ovation.

Bassey performed "I'm Still Here" and "The Lady Is A Tramp" on 13 November 2014 at the Royal Variety Performance in the presence of The Duke and Duchess of Cambridge.

Bassey released another album, Hello Like Before, on 17 November 2014. It included a 50th-anniversary re-recording of "Goldfinger" (recreating the original orchestration) and a duet of "Diamonds Are a Girl's Best Friend" with Paloma Faith, produced and conducted by Stuart Barr.

In December 2016, Bassey starred in a 60-minute BBC broadcast hosted by David Walliams.

On 11 March 2018, Bassey performed "Almost Like Being In Love" in a tribute to Bruce Forsyth at the London Palladium. At a gala for AmfAR (The Foundation for Aids Research) in Los Angeles on 18 October 2018, Bassey sang "Goldfinger", "Diamonds Are Forever", "Almost Like Being In Love" and "I Am What I Am".

On 9 August 2019, Bassey performed at UNICEF's Summer Gala in Porto Cervo, Sardinia, singing "Goldfinger", "Diamonds Are Forever" and "S'Wonderful". Bassey appeared on the Ball & Boe TV Christmas Special on Friday 20 December 2019, singing "Have Yourself a Merry Little Christmas" with Michael Ball and Alfie Boe.

=== 2020s ===
In 2020, with the release of her most recent album, I Owe It All To You, Bassey became the first female artist to have an album in the top 40 of the UK Albums Chart in seven consecutive decades.

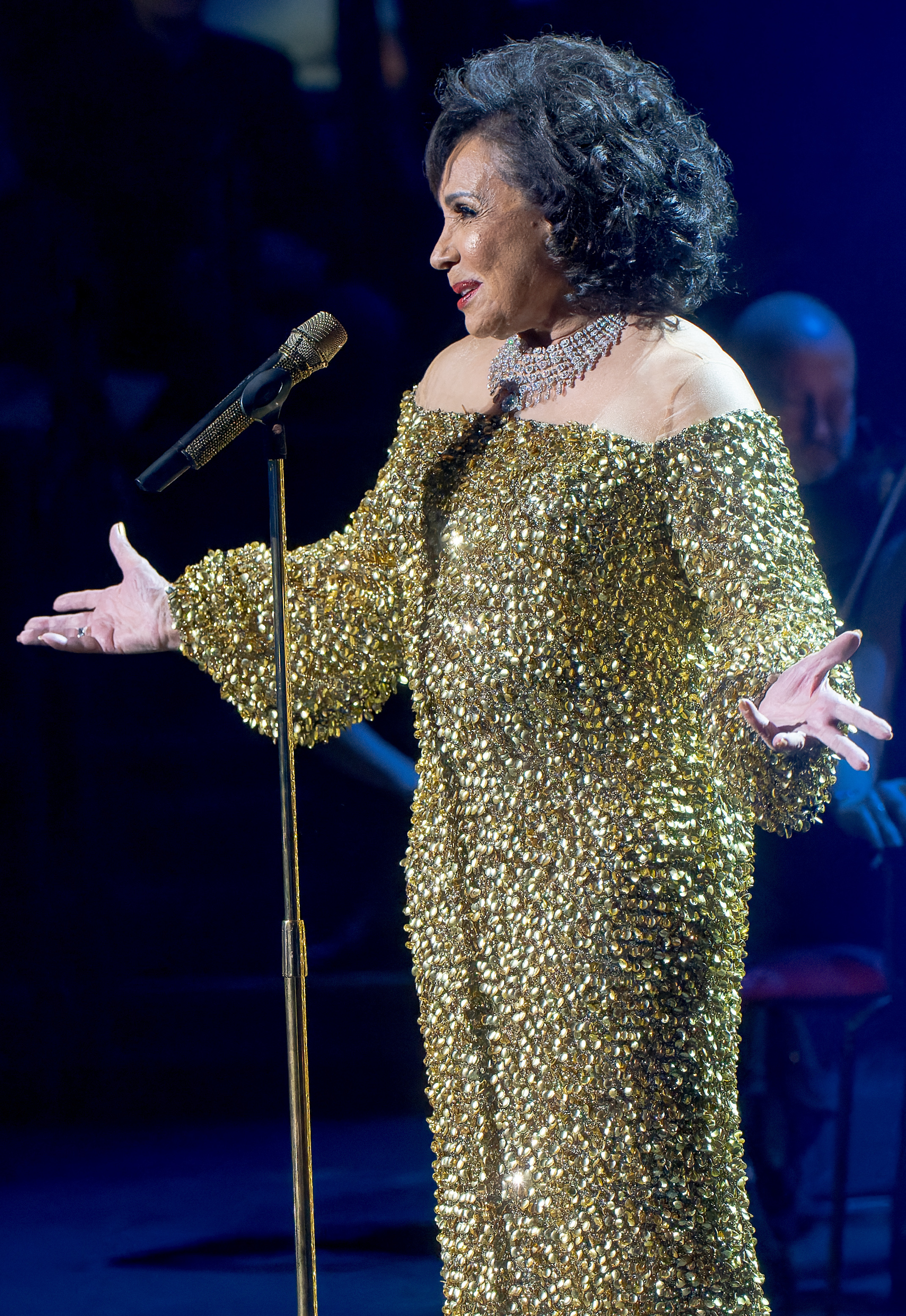
Bassey at The Sound of 007 in October 2022

On 13 March 2022 Bassey opened the BAFTA Film Awards at London's Royal Albert Hall with a performance of "Diamonds Are Forever". She performed again at the same venue on 4 October 2022 in The Sound of 007: Live from the Royal Albert Hall; both performances celebrated the 60th Anniversary of the James Bond films. In the latter she sang the two opening songs, "Diamonds Are Forever" and "Goldfinger". In 2023, Bassey was awarded The Order of Saint Charles by Prince Albert II of Monaco.

In May 2024, Bassey announced a charity auction of some of her "meaningful" jewels, including a diamond ring she was gifted by Elton John.

In December 2025, Bassey recorded a vocal performance as Celestina Warbeck in Harry Potter: The Full Cast Audio Editions, published by Audible and Pottermore Publishing. The recording included three new songs: You Stole My Cauldron But You Can't Have My Heart and A Cauldron Full Of Hot, Strong Love (both written by Ashley Griffin) and You Charmed The Heart Right Out Of Me (written by Kezia Tomsett). JK Rowling has previously suggested Shirley Bassey was an inspiration when creating the character.

== Personal life ==
=== Marriages ===
Bassey's first marriage was to Kenneth Hume in 1961. The couple separated in 1964 and divorced in 1965 in the wake of Bassey's affair with actor Peter Finch. She then announced to the press that she and Finch would not be marrying, telling the press: "It simply wouldn't work out. Just know I am not ready for marriage to anyone. I feel I have to be free." A year later, Hume sued Finch and another man, John McAuliffe, for being "indiscreet" with Bassey. Both Finch and McAuliffe were cited as co-respondents in the Hume–Bassey divorce. For her part, Bassey was named as co-respondent in 1965 when Finch's wife, South African actress Yolande Turner, divorced him.

From 1968 until they divorced in 1979, Bassey was married to Sergio Novak, the assistant manager of the Excelsior Hotel in Venice. During this time, Novak was Bassey's manager and they adopted Mark, her grand-nephew.

=== Children ===
The fathers of Bassey's two daughters, Sharon Bassey (a.k.a. Sharon Novak, born 1954) and Samantha Bassey (a.k.a. Samantha Novak, born 1963), are unknown. Bassey had Sharon at the age of 17 and her sister Ella raised her as her own daughter until the 1960s. Bassey's first husband suggested that Samantha, born during the couple's marriage, was the result of an affair between Bassey and Peter Finch.

In 1985, Samantha, age 21, was found dead in the River Avon in Bristol. Bassey has always maintained that the death of her daughter was not a suicide. On 24 March 2010, Avon and Somerset Police confirmed they were undertaking fresh inquiries into the death and specifically claimed that the convicted killer Michael Moffat was involved in her death. However, in October 2010 it was reported that the investigation had come to an end, concluding that there was "no evidence of any criminal act involved" in Novak's death. The ordeal of losing her daughter caused Bassey to temporarily lose her voice.

In a 2009 interview, Bassey stated that she and her son, Mark, had reconciled. Bassey has four grandsons through her surviving daughter, Sharon Novak.

As of 2009, Bassey resides in Monaco.

In 2018, Bassey reported that she had a great-granddaughter.

=== Health ===
Bassey expressed disappointment in March 2026 that, after undergoing surgery to her hand, she would no longer be able to reply to letters from fans.

=== Political views ===
In October 1981, Bassey performed at the Sun City casino resort in the Bantustan of Bophuthatswana, in defiance of the United Nations's cultural boycott against apartheid era South Africa. Bassey told the newspaper The Sowetan that no one had tried to stop her playing at Sun City and that she was "an entertainer and not a politician". During her residency there, James Gbeho, the Ghanaian ambassador to the UN and chair of the subcommittee of the Special Committee Against Apartheid, issued a statement that "They say we should separate politics from sport and culture...we on the committee do not believe in this distinction. As long as sport and culture is [sic] important to the racist minority government of South Africa it must be attacked and cooperation withheld to force that government to yield in the area of apartheid". Historian Kate Law notes that "Bassey – and artists like her who flouted the cultural boycott – were therefore firmly on the Anti-Apartheid Movement's radar." Bassey stated in November 1981 that she was "a singer, not a politician", refusing to rule out undertaking further performances at Sun City and saying "I'll go to Africa if I want". When Bassey played at St David's Hall, Cardiff in October 1982, the Welsh Anti-Apartheid Movement picketed the concert and called on Bassey to "think of the thousands of men, women and children who live at starvation levels" and to "denounce apartheid" and "promise never to visit South Africa again". Asked about her Sun City appearance in January 1984, she stated "I am not a political person, and I don't want to get embroiled in political matters ... But I think it is silly for people to make a big fuss when someone like myself or cricket players appear there [South Africa] ... so rather than having all this haggling, I don't think I will go back again to Sun City".

Bassey was a supporter of Margaret Thatcher. On being invited to attend her funeral in 2013, Bassey said, "I was enormously saddened to learn of the passing of Baroness Thatcher, and I am most honoured to be invited to attend her funeral, to pay my deepest respects. She was a truly inspirational woman who always showed me enormous warmth and kindness, and to me the greatest prime minister since Winston Churchill."

=== Relationship with own ethnic identity ===
Historian Kate Law has written that "Bassey has – publicly at least – maintained somewhat of an indifferent position towards questions of race, and indeed her own identity as a woman from a mixed ethnic background". Law notes that when a journalist asked Bassey to define her singing style after achieving her first number one hit song in 1959, Bassey responded by saying that she was "terrified by the power inside" and that "it's as though the African in me is trying to get out".

== Honours and accolades ==
Bassey was appointed Commander of the Order of the British Empire (CBE) in the 1994 New Year Honours and promoted to Dame Commander of the same Order (DBE) in the 2000 New Year Honours for services to entertainment. She was invited to perform in 2002 at the Party at the Palace, a public celebration of the Queen's Golden Jubilee. Bassey also performed at the Queen's Diamond Jubilee concert at Buckingham Palace on 4 June 2012, singing "Diamonds Are Forever". She was invited to perform at the Queen's 90th Birthday celebrations at Windsor Castle on 15 May 2016. She was appointed Member of the Order of the Companions of Honour (CH) in the 2024 New Year Honours for services to music.

In 2012, Bassey was among the British cultural icons selected by artist Peter Blake to appear in a new version of his most famous artwork – the Beatles' Sgt. Pepper's Lonely Hearts Club Band album cover – to celebrate the British cultural figures of his life that he most admires. In 2016, she was named as one of "the 50 greatest Welsh men and women of all time". In November 2016 the Royal Welsh College of Music and Drama announced the naming of the Shirley Bassey Studio in celebration of Bassey's long-standing support for young Welsh singers studying at the College. She was made a Knight of France's Legion of Honour in 2003, to signify her popularity and importance in the culture of France. Bassey was awarded the freedom of her hometown, Cardiff, in a ceremony at City Hall on 17 May 2019.

Bassey received the following honours:

- 1993: Honorary Fellowship of the Royal Welsh College of Music and Drama
- 1994: Commander of the Order of the British Empire (United Kingdom)
- 1998: Longest run by a solo artist (ten shows) – Royal Festival Hall, London
- 1999: Madame Tussaud's waxwork unveiled in London (second model in Las Vegas)
- 2000: Dame Commander of the Order of the British Empire (United Kingdom)
- 2003: Knight of the National Order of the Legion of Honour (France)
- 2004: Ranked no. 8 on the list of "100 Great Black Britons"
- 2005: Avenue of Stars – plaque unveiled in London
- 2018: She unveiled a carriage on the Snowdon Mountain Railway, named in her honour
- 2019: Freedom of the City of Cardiff
- 2019: Square of Fame – plaque of Bassey's handprints unveiled at the SSE Arena, Wembley Park, London
- 2020: Official UK Chart Record – First female artist to claim a top-40 album in seven consecutive decades
- 2023: Grand Officer of the Order of Saint Charles (Monaco)
- 2024: Member of the Order of the Companions of Honour (United Kingdom)

=== Awards and nominations ===
Grammy Awards

Year	Nominee / work	Award	Result
1999	The Birthday Concert	Best Traditional Pop Vocal Album	Nominated
2008	"Goldfinger"	Grammy Hall of Fame (Single)	Inducted

NME Awards

Year	Nominee / work	Award	Result
1959	Shirley Bassey	Favourite British Singer	Won
1960	Shirley Bassey	Favourite British Singer	Won

Bassey has also received the following awards and nominations:

- 1972: Best Female Performance (For All We Know) – Radio Luxembourg Awards
- 1972: Best Female Singer – TV Times
- 1973: Best Female Singer – TV Times
- 1974: Best Female Entertainer – American Guild of Variety Artists
- 1976: Best Female Singer – Music Week
- 1976: EMI Award for twenty years as a recording artist – UK
- 1977: Best British Female Solo Artist in the previous 25 years – BRIT Award
- 1977: Golden Rose of Montreux nomination for Shirley Bassey
- 1991: Walk of Fame, Star Boulevard – plaque unveiled in Rotterdam
- 1995: Showbusiness Personality of the Year – Variety Club of Great Britain
- 2003: Outstanding Contribution to Music – National Music Awards, UK
- 2003: Lifetime Achievement Award (inaugural award) – Western Mail Welsh Woman of the Year Awards
- 2004: Artist for Peace Award – UNESCO
- 2004: Welsh Legend Award, presented at the opening of the Cardiff Millennium Centre
- 2013: Dorian Award, TV Musical Performance of the Year – Gay and Lesbian Entertainment Critics Association
- 2014: Lifetime Achievement Award – World Music Awards
- 2017: Hall of Fame Award, Jersey Style Awards
- 2017: Nordoff Robbins O2 Silver Clef Award
- 2023: Commemorative coins released by The Royal Mint (UK)
- 2023: Commemorative postage stamps released by The Royal Mail (UK)
- 2025: Lifetime Achievement Music Award – Grand Prix Maria Callas Gala (Monaco)
- 2025: Lifetime Achievement Award – Black Welsh Music Awards

== Discography ==
=== Studio albums ===
- Born to Sing the Blues (1958)
- The Bewitching Miss Bassey (1959)
- The Fabulous Shirley Bassey (1959)
- Shirley (1961)
- Shirley Bassey (1962)
- Let's Face the Music (1962)
- Shirley Stops the Shows (1965)
- I've Got a Song for You (1966)
- And We Were Lovers (1967)
- 12 of Those Songs (1968)
- This Is My Life (1968)
- Does Anybody Miss Me (1969)
- Something (1970)
- Something Else (1971)
- I Capricorn (1972)
- And I Love You So (1972)
- Never Never Never (1973)
- Nobody Does It Like Me (1974)
- Good, Bad but Beautiful (1975)
- Love, Life and Feelings (1976)
- You Take My Heart Away (1977)
- Yesterdays (1978)
- The Magic Is You (1979)
- All by Myself (1982)
- I Am What I Am (1984)
- La Mujer (1989)
- Keep the Music Playing (1991)
- The Bond Collection (1992)
- Sings the Songs of Andrew Lloyd Webber (1993)
- Shirley Bassey Sings the Movies (1995)
- The Show Must Go On (1996)
- The Performance (2009)
- Hello Like Before (2014)
- I Owe It All to You (2020)

== Television specials ==
No.	Title	Directed by	Original release date
1	"Shirley Comes Home"	Selwyn Roderick	3 September 1957 BBC Television at 6:45 pm
From the bright lights of Las Vegas and the West End, Shirley Bassey returns to her own people in the heart of Cardiff's dockland. Also at the party are: Gladys Morgan, Jimmy Rogers and 'The Black and Whites'. Introduced by Alun Williams from Cardiff's Queen Alexandra Dock.
2	"Shirley Sings and Riddle Swings"	Yvonne Littlewood	23 June 1962 BBC Television at 8:20 pm
Shirley Bassey, Nelson Riddle and his Orchestra and The Hi-Lo's. Introduced by David Jacobs.
3	"International Cabaret presenting Shirley Bassey"	Buddy Bregman	25 April 1964 BBC2 at 9:40 pm
Starring Shirley Bassey with Robert Clary and The Ted Heath Orchestra. Musical director: Harry Rabinowitz. With The Heralds and the International Cabaret Dancers. Repeated on BBC1 18 August 1964 at 8:25 pm.
4	"Show of the Week: The Sound of Shirley Bassey"	Stewart Morris	22 February 1966 BBC2 at 8:50 pm
Recorded on the eve of her departure for a world tour. Orchestra directed by Kenny Clayton. Repeated 8 July 1967 at 7:40 pm.
5	"The Shirley Bassey Show"	Tony Charmoli	12 April 1969 BBC1 at 7:40 pm
Shirley Bassey sings and introduces her guests Noel Harrison and Laurindo Almeida.
6	"Show of the Week: Shirley Bassey at Bern's Restaurant"	Stewart Morris	6 July 1969 BBC2 at 9:55 pm
Shirley Bassey at Bern's Restaurant, Stockholm. Orchestra directed by Alyn Ainsworth. A BBC co-production with Sveriges Radio. Repeated on BBC1 20 September 1969 at 7:30 pm.
7	"The Young Generation Meet Shirley Bassey"	Stewart Morris	18 March 1970 BBC1 at 8:00 pm
From the Cirkus Studio in Stockholm, Sweden. With Udo Jürgens, Andre Tahon and Ray Dondy with Alyn Ainsworth and his orchestra. A joint BBC/SR production.
8	"Shirley Bassey Singing Special"	Stewart Morris	13 August 1970 BBC1 at 9:10 pm
Tonight this international singing star makes one of her rare appearances in this country. With Brian Fahey and his orchestra. Repeated on BBC2 23 December 1970 at 9:20 pm.
9	"Night Club starring Shirley Bassey"	John Ammonds	11 June 1972 BBC2 at 11:05 pm
An international cabaret this week from London introduced by Francis Matthews. Also starring Trio Athenee, Rod Hull and Emu, Alfredo Alex Welsh and his Band, Joe Castor and Partner and the Pamela Devis Dancers. The Night Club Orchestra directed by Johnny Harris.
10	"Show of the Week: Shirley Bassey"	Dieter Finnern	28 September 1972 BBC2 at 9:25 pm
Shirley Bassey on location in Sardinia and Berlin sings some of the songs which have made her famous. With the SFB Orchestra directed by Brian Fahey. A BBC/SFB Co-production.
11	"Shirley Bassey"	Stewart Morris	26 December 1972 BBC1 at 9:55 pm
Shirley Bassey Recently returned from a record-breaking appearance in New York. With 'Segment' choreographed by Nigel Lythgoe and featuring Alyn Ainsworth and his orchestra.
12	"Shirley Bassey at the Royal Albert Hall"	Johnnie Stewart	1 January 1974 BBC1 at 9:25 pm
Orchestra directed by Arthur Greenslade. Repeated on 19 April 1974 at 8:15 pm.
13	"Shirley"	Stewart Morris	28 December 1974 BBC1 at 8:30 pm
Starring international singing star Shirley Bassey with her special guest Neil Diamond. Orchestra directed by Arthur Greenslade.
14	"Shirley Bassey"	Stewart Morris	27 December 1975 BBC1 at 8:20 pm
From the triumphs of a world tour, this superbly talented artist arrives for another high-flying television special. Tonight Shirley sings many of her famous hits together with a selection of new songs. Orchestra directed by Arthur Greenslade. Repeated on BBC2 16 April 1976 at 9:10 pm.
15	"Shirley Bassey: I Am What I Am"	Mike Alexander	30 July 1994 BBC1 at 9:50 pm
In a documentary that is almost as revealing as her dresses, Shirley Bassey talks about her work and the cost to her family life.
16	"The Shirley Bassey Concert"	Gavin Taylor	30 July 1994 BBC1 at 10:40 pm
Footage of a performance shot last September as Shirley Bassey opened Cardiff's new International Arena with two sell-out shows before an audience of 11,000 fans.
17	"Shirley Bassey: This Is My Life"	Alan Lewens	2 January 1998 BBC1 at 10:05 pm
A documentary portrait of the internationally-acclaimed vocalist, following her travels through New York, London and Monte Carlo. The programme contains intimate moments behind the scenes as well as capturing her performances on the stage. Repeated 7 April 2000.
18	"Shirley Bassey: Viva Diva!"	Mike Mansfield	31 December 1998 BBC1 at 9:10 pm
Shirley Bassey sings a selection of show stopping songs, with the help of a large orchestra, the cast of the hit West End stage musical Chicago and a million pounds' worth of diamonds.
19	"Dame Shirley Bassey: Electric Proms"	Janet Fraser Cook	24 October 2009 BBC2 at 10:40 pm
The singer celebrates 50 years in the business with a special performance at London's Roundhouse. Repeated multiple times on BBC HD and BBC4.
20	"Imagine... Dame Shirley Bassey"	Dione Newton	24 November 2009 BBC1 at 10:35 pm
Dame Shirley Bassey: The Girl from Tiger Bay. A profile of the Welsh singer on the release of The Performance, an album of songs composed for her by, among others: Gary Barlow, Rufus Wainwright and KT Tunstall.

== Bibliography ==
- "Shirley Bassey: Diamonds Are Forever" – Mary Long (2017)
- Miss Shirley Bassey – John L. Williams (2010) – London: Quercus. ISBN 978-1-84724-974-6
- Shirley Bassey: Diamond Diva – Peter Hogan (2008)
- Cardiff: Rebirth of a Capital (Foreword by Shirley Bassey) – Ungersma, Hurn (2005)
- Shirley Bassey: Welsh History Stories – Evans, Stokes, ap Emlyn, ap Emlyn (2003)
- Shirley Bassey: An appreciation – Muriel Burgess (1998, reprinted 1999)
- My Life on Record and in Concert – Shirley Bassey (Bloomsbury, 1998)
- The Trial of Shirley Bassey – A Play in One Act – Alexander Baron (1998)
- Shirley Bassey: This Is My Life (Piano/vocal/guitar) – Sheet music book
- Shirley Bassey: You're the Voice (Piano/vocal/guitar) – Sheet music book
- Guinness Book of British Hit Singles – 14th Edition – ISBN 0-85156-156-X
- Guinness Book of British Hit Singles – 16th Edition – ISBN 0-85112-190-X
- Guinness Book of British Hit Albums – 7th Edition – ISBN 0-85112-619-7
- The Book of Golden Discs – 2nd Edition – ISBN 0-214-20512-6
- The Guinness Book of 500 Number One Hits – ISBN 0-85112-250-7

== See also ==
- List of best-selling music artists
- Legion of Honour
- Legion of Honour Museum
- List of Legion of Honour recipients by name (B)
- List of foreign recipients of Legion of Honour by name
- List of foreign recipients of the Legion of Honour by country
- List of foreign recipients of the Legion of Honour by decade

Preceded by Matt Monro; From Russia with Love, 1963	James Bond title artist Goldfinger, 1964	Succeeded by Tom Jones; Thunderball, 1965
Preceded by John Barry; On Her Majesty's Secret Service, 1969	James Bond title artist Diamonds Are Forever, 1971	Succeeded by Paul McCartney and Wings; Live and Let Die, 1973
Preceded by Carly Simon; The Spy Who Loved Me (Nobody Does It Better), 1977	James Bond title artist Moonraker, 1979	Succeeded by Sheena Easton; For Your Eyes Only, 1981
