= Five Roundabouts to Heaven =

1953 novel

- First edition
- Author: John Bingham
- Language: English
- Genre: Thriller
- Publisher: Gollancz
- Publication date: 1953
- Publication place: United Kingdom
- Media type: Print

Five Roundabouts to Heaven is a 1953 thriller novel by the British writer John Bingham. It was published in the United States by Dodd Mead using the alternative title The Tender Poisoner. It was his second published novel following his debut My Name Is Michael Sibley the previous year.

== Adaptations ==
In 1962 it was adapted for an episode of the Alfred Hitchcock Hour television series starring Dan Dailey and Jan Sterling entitled The Tender Poisoner. In 2007 it served as the basis for the film Married Life starring Rachel McAdams and Pierce Brosnan.

== Bibliography ==
- Reilly, John M. Twentieth Century Crime & Mystery Writers. Springer, 2015.
