= Night's Black Agents (disambiguation) =

Night's Black Agents is a 1947 collection of fantasy and horror short stories by Fritz Leiber.

Night's Black Agents may also refer to:

- Night's Black Agents (Doctor Who audio), a 2010 audiobook based on the British science fiction television series
- Night's Black Agents (role-playing game), a 2012 vampire spy thriller game
- Night's Black Agent, a 1961 thriller novel
