= Madeleine Bingham =

English writer (1912–1988)

Madeleine Mary Bingham (1 February 1912 – 16 February 1988, née Ebel, sometimes misspelled Madeline) was a British playwright, novelist and historian. She also wrote under the pseudonym Julia Mannering. She was married to John Bingham, 7th Baron Clanmorris, so had the title Baroness Clanmorris.

== Early life and wartime work ==
Madeleine Ebel was born on 1 February 1912, the eldest daughter of Clement Ebel, managing director of a firm of interior decorators, and met John Bingham at a secretarial college, where he was learning shorthand and typing to prepare for a planned post as private secretary to a millionaire. They married on 28 July 1934. Madeleine worked for some time as a journalist for newspaper The Times.

Both Madeleine and John joined the Security Service soon after the start of World War II. She worked at Blenheim Palace in administration and later in the Special Operations Executive, when she was based at the HQ in Baker Street and "kept a drawer of suicide tablets for agents".

== Writing ==
Bingham wrote plays, historical biographies, and a miscellany of other books. She published her autobiography Peers and Plebs: Two Families in a Changing World in 1975, in which she described the contrast between her and her husband's backgrounds: hers Catholic, with mid-European roots, and his firmly Northern-Irish protestant. The book only covers her life up to 1937 and the birth of her son: she makes no reference to her or her husband's work with the security service. It is said that she had later planned to write a book about her husband's life, including the suggestion that he had been the model for John le Carré's character George Smiley, but that she was firmly told that "no such book would be tolerated".

Her plays included a three-act comedy, The Men From The Ministry, first performed at the Aldwych Theatre in London in 1946 and later in Bristol in 1948 or 1949, and The Real Mccoy, performed in Sheffield in 1964.

Her books included biographies of Richard Brinsley Sheridan, Sir John Vanbrugh, Henry Irving and Herbert Beerbohm Tree, and wide range of further titles including Scotland under Mary Stuart : an account of everyday life, Princess Lieven : Russian intriguer, Earls and girls : dramas in high society, The passionate poet : a romantic story based upon Lord Byron's loves and adventures, and How to be a good daughter-in-law.

A collection of the papers of John and Madeleine Bingham is held in the Gotlieb Contemporary Archive Collection at Boston University Libraries

== Personal life ==
Madeleine Bingham died suddenly on 16 February 1988; her husband died six months later from cancer, and they were survived by their two children. Their son inherited the title and is Simon Bingham, 8th Baron Clanmorris (born 1937), and their daughter is the writer Charlotte Bingham (born 1942).

== Selected publications ==
Bingham's publications listed in the catalogue of the British Library or WorldCat include:

- The man from the ministry: French, 1947, a play
- The Passionate Poet, etc: Museum Press, 1951, a novel by "Julia Mannering" about Lord Byron's love-life
- Look to the rose: Museum Press, 1953, a novel by "Julia Mannering"
- Cheapest in the end: Dodd, Meade, 1963
- Your wedding guide: Transworld, 1967
- Something's burning : the bad cook's guide: Corgi, 1968
- Teach your own child: Transworld, 1968
- A Career for your daughter: Corgi, 1969
- How to be a good daughter-in-law: Redemptorist Publications, 1969
- Mary, Queen of Scots: International Textbook, 1969 on Mary, Queen of Scots
- A career at forty: Transworld, 1971
- Scotland under Mary Stuart : an account of everyday life: Allen and Unwin, 1971
- Sheridan: the track of a comet: Allen and Unwin, 1972, on Richard Brinsley Sheridan
- Masks and façades: Sir John Vanbrugh, the man in his setting: Allen and Unwin, 1974, on John Vanbrugh
- The Making of Kew: Joseph, 1975, on Kew Gardens
- Peers and plebs: two families in a changing world: Allen and Unwin, 1975, autobiography up to 1937
- Henry Irving and the Victorian theatre: Allen and Unwin, 1978, on Henry Irving (published in USA as Henry Irving: the greatest Victorian actor )
- 'The great lover' : the life and art of Herbert Beerbohm Tree: H. Hamilton, 1978, on Herbert Beerbohm Tree
- Earls and girls: dramas in high society: H. Hammilton, 1980
- Princess Lieven : Russian intriguer: Hamish Hamilton, 1982, on Dorothea Lieven
- Belinda and the baron : or The rape of the lock : a period comedy with music, based on the poem by Alexander Pope / words by Madeleine Bingham and Suzanne Ebel.: Thames, 1989
