= Something (Beatles song) =

1969 single by the Beatles

- 1989 UK reissue picture sleeve

Single by the Beatles

from the album Abbey Road
- A-side: "Come Together" (double A-side)
- Released: 6 October 1969
- Recorded: 2 May – 15 August 1969
- Studio: EMI and Olympic, London
- Genre: Rock; pop; soft rock
- Length: 2:59
- Label: Apple
- Songwriter: George Harrison
- Producer: George Martin

The Beatles singles chronology
"The Ballad of John and Yoko" (1969)	"Something" / "Come Together" (1969)	"Let It Be" (1970)

Song sample
- file; help

Promotional film
- "Something" on YouTube

"Something" is a song by the English rock band the Beatles from their 1969 studio album Abbey Road. It was written by George Harrison, the band's lead guitarist. Together with his second contribution to Abbey Road, "Here Comes the Sun", it is widely viewed by music historians as having marked Harrison's ascendancy as a composer to the level of the Beatles' principal songwriters, John Lennon and Paul McCartney. Two weeks after the album's release, the song was issued on a double A-side single, coupled with "Come Together", making it the first Harrison composition to become a Beatles A-side. The pairing was also the first time in the United Kingdom that the Beatles issued a single containing tracks already available on an album. While the single's commercial performance was lessened by this, it topped the Billboard Hot 100 in the United States as well as charts in Australia, Canada, New Zealand and West Germany, and peaked at number 4 in the UK.

The track is generally considered a love song to Pattie Boyd, Harrison's first wife, although Harrison offered alternative sources of inspiration in later interviews. Owing to the difficulty he faced in getting more than two of his compositions onto each Beatles album, Harrison first offered the song to Joe Cocker. As recorded by the Beatles, the track features a guitar solo that several music critics identify among Harrison's finest playing. The song also drew praise from the other Beatles and their producer, George Martin, with Lennon stating that it was the best song on Abbey Road. The promotional film for the single combined footage of each of the Beatles with his respective wife, reflecting the estrangement in the band during the months preceding their break-up in April 1970. Harrison subsequently performed the song at his Concert for Bangladesh shows in 1971 and throughout the two tours he made as a solo artist.

"Something" received the Ivor Novello Award for the "Best Song Musically and Lyrically" of 1969. By the late 1970s, it had been covered by over 150 artists, making it the second-most covered Beatles composition after "Yesterday". Shirley Bassey had a top-five UK hit with her 1970 recording, and Frank Sinatra regularly performed the song, calling it "the greatest love song of the past 50 years." Other artists who have covered it include Elvis Presley, Ray Charles, Booker T. & the M.G.'s, James Brown, Smokey Robinson and Johnny Rodriguez. In 1999, Broadcast Music Incorporated named "Something" as the 17th-most performed song of the twentieth century, with 5 million performances. In 2000, Mojo ranked "Something" at number 14 in the magazine's list of "The 100 Greatest Songs of All Time"; it was ranked 110th on Rolling Stone's 2021 list of the "500 Greatest Songs of All Time". In 2002, a year after Harrison's death, McCartney and Eric Clapton performed it at the Concert for George tribute at London's Royal Albert Hall.

== Background and inspiration ==
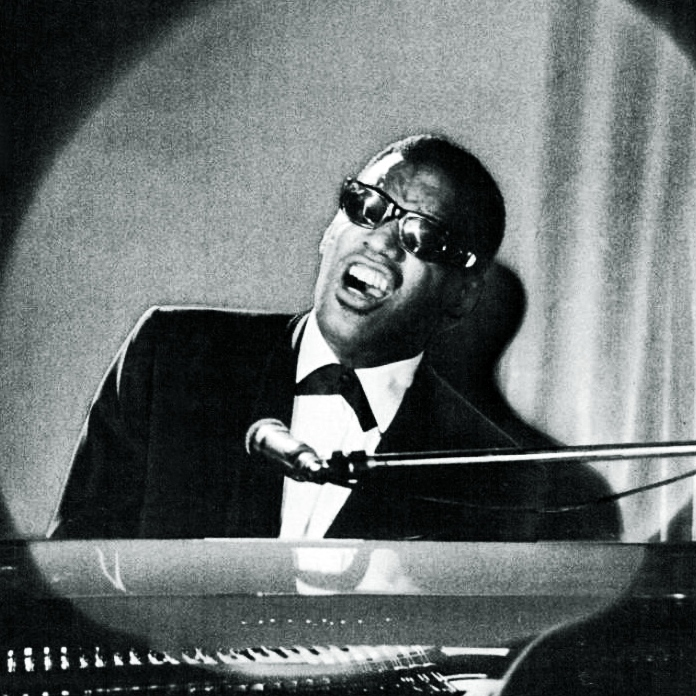
Harrison identified Ray Charles as one of his sources of inspiration for the song.

George Harrison began writing "Something" in September 1968, during a session for the Beatles' self-titled double album, also known as "the White Album". In his autobiography, I, Me, Mine, he recalls working on the melody on a piano, at the same time as Paul McCartney recorded overdubs in a neighbouring studio at London's Abbey Road Studios. Harrison suspended work on the song, believing that with the tune having come to him so easily, it might have been a melody from another song. In I, Me, Mine, he wrote that the middle eight "took some time to sort out".

The opening lyric was taken from the title of "Something in the Way She Moves", a track by James Taylor, another Apple Records artist. While Harrison imagined the composition in the style of Ray Charles, his inspiration for "Something" was his wife, Pattie Boyd. In her 2007 autobiography, Wonderful Today, Boyd recalls: "He told me, in a matter-of-fact way, that he had written it for me. I thought it was beautiful ..." Boyd discusses the song's popularity among other recording artists and concludes: "My favourite [version] was the one by George Harrison, which he played to me in the kitchen at Kinfauns."

Having begun to write love songs that were directed at both God and a woman, with his White Album track "Long, Long, Long", Harrison later cited alternative sources for his inspiration for "Something". In early 1969, according to author Joshua Greene, Harrison told his friends from the Hare Krishna Movement that the song was about the Hindu deity Krishna; in an interview with Rolling Stone in 1976, he said of his approach to writing love songs: "all love is part of a universal love. When you love a woman, it's the God in her that you see." By 1996, Harrison had denied writing "Something" for Boyd. That year, he told a music journalist that "everybody presumed I wrote it about Pattie" because of the promotional film accompanying the release of the Beatles' recording, which showed the couple together.

== Composition ==
In the version issued on the Beatles' 1969 album Abbey Road, which was the first release for the song, "Something" runs at a speed of around 66 beats per minute and is in common time throughout. It begins with a guitar figure, which functions as the song's chorus, since it is repeated before each of the verses and also closes the track. The melody is in the key of C major until the eight-measure-long bridge, or middle eight, which is in the key of A major. Harrison biographer Simon Leng identifies "harmonic interest ... [in] almost every line" of the song, as the melody follows a series of descending half-steps from the tonic over the verses, a structure that is then mirrored in the new key, through the middle eight. The melody returns to C major for the guitar solo, the third verse, and the outro.

Leng considers that, lyrically and musically, "Something" reflects "doubt and striving to attain an uncertain goal". Author Ian Inglis writes of the confident statements that Harrison makes throughout regarding his feelings for Boyd. Referring to lines in the song's verses, Inglis writes: "there is a clear and mutual confidence in the reciprocal nature of their love; he muses that [Boyd] 'attracts me like no other lover' and 'all I have to do is think of her,' but he is equally aware that she feels the same, that 'somewhere in her smile, she knows.'" Similarly, when Harrison sings in the middle eight that "You're asking me will my love grow / I don't know, I don't know", Inglis interprets the words as "not an indication of uncertainty, but a wry reflection that his love is already so complete that it may simply be impossible for it to become any greater". Richie Unterberger of AllMusic describes "Something" as "an unabashedly straightforward and sentimental love song" written at a time "when most of the Beatles' songs were dealing with non-romantic topics or presenting cryptic and allusive lyrics even when they were writing about love".

== Pre–Abbey Road recording history ==
=== The Beatles' Get Back/Let It Be rehearsals ===
Harrison introduced "Something" at a Beatles session on 19 September 1968, when he played it to George Martin's stand-in as producer of The Beatles, Chris Thomas, while the latter was working out the harpsichord part for Harrison's track "Piggies". Despite Thomas's enthusiasm for the new composition, Harrison chose to focus on "Piggies". He told Thomas that he intended to offer "Something" to singer Jackie Lomax, whose debut album Harrison was producing for Apple Records. "Something" was not among the tracks released on Lomax's album, much of which was recorded in Los Angeles after The Beatles was completed.

When the Beatles began their Get Back film project (later released as Let It Be), in January 1969, "Something" was one of many recent compositions that Harrison offered to the group. Leng describes this period as a prolific one for Harrison as a songwriter, comparing it with John Lennon's peak of creativity over 1963–64, yet Harrison's songs received little interest from Lennon and McCartney amid the tense, uncooperative atmosphere within the band. Martin was also unimpressed by "Something" at first, considering it "too weak and derivative", according to music journalist Mikal Gilmore.

The Beatles rehearsed the song at Apple Studio on 28 January. With the proceedings being recorded by director Michael Lindsay-Hogg for the planned documentary film, tapes reveal Harrison discussing his unfinished lyrics for "Something" with Lennon and McCartney, since he had been unable to complete the song's second line, which begins "Attracts me ..." To serve as a temporary filler, Lennon suggested "like a cauliflower", which Harrison then altered to "like a pomegranate". In their study of the available tapes, Doug Sulpy and Ray Schweighardt write that the Beatles gave the song two run-throughs that day, which was the only occasion that they attempted it during the Get Back/Let It Be project.

=== Harrison solo demo ===
Following the Beatles' brief efforts with "Something" on 28 January, Harrison talked with Lennon and Yoko Ono about recording a solo album of his unused songs, since he had already stockpiled enough compositions "for the next ten years", given his usual allocation of two tracks per album, and to "preserve this, the Beatle bit, more". Lennon offered his support for the idea, similarly keen that his and Ono's recording projects outside the Beatles could continue without jeopardising the band's future. On 25 February 1969 – Harrison's 26th birthday – he entered Abbey Road Studios and taped solo demos of "Something", "Old Brown Shoe" and "All Things Must Pass", the last two of which had also been rejected recently by Lennon and McCartney.

With Ken Scott serving as engineer, Harrison recorded a live take of "Something", featuring electric guitar and vocal. By this point, Harrison had completed the lyrics, although he included an extra verse, sung to a counter-melody, over the section that would comprise his guitar solo on the Beatles' subsequent official recording. This demo version of "Something" remained unreleased until its inclusion on the Beatles Anthology 3 in 1996. (Note: The Anthology 3 track omits a piano overdub that was present on the acetate from Harrison's birthday session.)

=== Joe Cocker demo ===
In March 1969, Harrison gave "Something" to Joe Cocker to record, having decided that it was more likely to become a hit with Cocker than with Lomax. Referring to this and similar examples where Harrison placed his overlooked songs with other recording artists, Ken Scott has rebutted the idea that he lacked confidence as a songwriter in the Beatles, saying:

I think he was totally confident about the songs. The insecurity may have been, if the Beatles kept going, "How many songs am I going to be able to get on each album?", and with the backlog sort of mounting up ... [to] get it out there, and get something from it.

Assisted by Harrison, Cocker recorded a demo of the song at Apple. While musicologist Walter Everett suggests that this was the same recording of "Something" that appeared on the Joe Cocker! album in November 1969, Beatles historian Mark Lewisohn writes that Cocker subsequently remade the track.

== Recording and production ==
George's "Something" was out of left field. It was about Pattie, and it appealed to me because it has a very beautiful melody and is a really structured song ... I think George thought my bass-playing was a little bit busy. Again, from my side, I was trying to contribute the best I could, but maybe it was his turn to tell me I was too busy.

— Paul McCartney, 2000

The Beatles undertook the recording of Abbey Road with a sense of discipline and cooperation that had largely been absent while making the White Album and Let It Be. Having temporarily left the group in January 1969, partly as a result of McCartney's criticism of his musicianship, Harrison exhibited a greater level of assertiveness regarding his place in the band, particularly while they worked on his compositions "Something" and "Here Comes the Sun". In addition, like Lennon and McCartney, Martin had come to fully appreciate Harrison as a songwriter, later saying: "I first recognised that he really had a great talent when we did 'Here Comes the Sun.' But when he brought in 'Something,' it was something else ... It was a tremendous work – and so simple."

The group recorded "Something" on 16 April before Harrison decided to redo the song, a new basic track for which was then completed at Abbey Road on 2 May. The line-up was Harrison on Leslie-effected rhythm guitar, Lennon on piano, McCartney on bass, Ringo Starr on drums, and guest musician Billy Preston playing Hammond organ. On 5 May, at Olympic Sound Studios, McCartney re-recorded his bass part and Harrison added lead guitar. According to EMI engineer Geoff Emerick, Harrison asked McCartney to simplify his playing, but McCartney refused. At this point, the song ran to eight minutes, due to the inclusion of an extended, jam-like coda led by Lennon's piano.

After taking a break from recording, the band returned to "Something" on 11 July, when Harrison overdubbed what would turn out to be a temporary vocal. With the resulting reduction mix, much of the coda, along with almost all of Lennon's playing on the main part of the song, was cut from the recording. The piano can be heard only in the middle eight, specifically during the descending run that follows each pair of "I don't know" vocal lines. (Note: Lennon later reprised the piano chords from the discarded coda in his 1970 song "Remember". Music critic Richie Unterberger describes this coda as "unclassifiably strange" and at odds, in melody, mood and time signature, with Harrison's composition. The version of "Something" with the piano-led jam was one of several tracks considered but passed over for inclusion on the three Anthology albums.) On 16 July, Harrison recorded a new vocal, with McCartney overdubbing his harmony vocal over the middle eight and Starr adding both a second hi-hat part and a cymbal.

Following another reduction mix, at which point the remainder of the coda was excised from the track, Martin-arranged string orchestration was overdubbed on 15 August, as Harrison, working in the adjacent studio at Abbey Road, re-recorded his lead guitar part live. Writing for Rolling Stone in 2002, David Fricke described the Beatles' version of "Something" as "actually two moods in one: the pillowy yearning of the verses ... and the golden thunder of the bridge, the latter driven by Ringo Starr's military flourish on a high-hat cymbal". Leng highlights Harrison's guitar solo on the recording as "a performance that is widely regarded as one of the great guitar solos", and one in which Harrison incorporates the gamaks associated with Indian classical music, following his study of the sitar in 1965–68, while also foreshadowing the expressive style he would adopt on slide guitar as a solo artist.

== Release ==
=== Selection for single release ===
They blessed me with a couple of B-sides in the past, but this is the first time I've had an A-side. Big deal, eh?

— George Harrison to BBC reporter David Wigg, 8 October 1969

Apple Records issued Abbey Road on 26 September 1969, with "Something" sequenced as the second track, following Lennon's "Come Together". Lennon considered "Something" to be the best song on the album. Having ensured that "Old Brown Shoe" was chosen as the B-side for the Beatles' single "The Ballad of John and Yoko", according to his later recollection, Lennon now pushed Allen Klein to release "Something" as a single from Abbey Road. Coupled with "Come Together", the single was issued on 6 October in America (as Apple 2654) and 31 October in Britain (as Apple R5814).

The release marked the first (and only) time that a Harrison composition had been afforded A-side treatment on a Beatles single, as well as the only time during their career that a single was issued in the UK featuring tracks already available on an album. In a 1990 letter to Mark Lewisohn, Klein rebutted a claim made by Lewisohn in his book The Complete Beatles Recording Sessions, that the single was intended as a money-making exercise: Klein said it was purely a mark of Lennon's regard for "Something" and "to point out George as a writer, and give him courage to go in and do his own LP. Which he did." (Note: Allan Steckler, Klein's colleague, dismissed another claim made by Beatles biographers, that Klein was merely attempting to win Harrison's support. Steckler said: "Klein believed in George's talent and wanted to enhance his reputation as a songwriter.") Following the Beatles' break-up in April 1970, Harrison's ascendancy as a songwriter would continue with his triple album All Things Must Pass, building on the promise of White Album tracks such as "While My Guitar Gently Weeps" and his two contributions to Abbey Road.

=== Promotional film ===
Harrison and Boyd in the "Something" film clip

The promotional film for "Something" was shot in late October 1969, not long after Lennon privately announced that he was leaving the band. By this time, the band members had grown apart. As a result, the film consisted of separate clips, edited together, featuring the Beatles walking around the grounds of their homes with their respective wives. Harrison's segment shows him and Boyd together in the garden at Kinfauns; in author John Winn's description, Harrison appears "solemn" while Boyd is seen "smiling sweetly" and "sporting leather and fur coats". Winn also comments on the attractiveness of all the wives in contrast to the unkempt appearance of McCartney, especially, who had sunk into depression at the realisation that the Beatles were over. The four segments were edited and compiled into a single film clip by Neil Aspinall. Writing in The New York Times following Aspinall's death in 2008, Allan Kozinn said: "What Mr. Aspinall's idyllic film avoided showing was that the Beatles were at that point barely on speaking terms. In the film, no two Beatles are seen together."

In 2015, following restoration overseen by Apple's Jonathan Clyde, the "Something" promo film was included in the Beatles' video compilation 1 and its expanded edition, 1+. Rolling Stone journalist Rob Sheffield comments on the significance of the clip, with regard to the band's history:

[E]ach couple projects a totally different vibe – George and Patti peacocking in their hippie-royalty finery, Paul and Linda on the farm in Scotland with Martha the sheepdog, Ringo and Maureen goofing around on motorbikes, John and Yoko serene in their matching black robes. Each Beatle looks like he's found what he was looking for – but they're heading for four separate futures.

In her review of 1+, for Paste, Gillian Gaar says that with the Beatles' promotional films of their singles, from "Love Me Do" to "Something" (the last one they made during their career), "you can see the development of the promo clip, progressing from a short film that simply served up a straight performance to a piece of work that was striving to be something more artistic."

== Critical reception ==
=== Contemporary reviews ===
Time magazine declared "Something" to be the best track on Abbey Road, while John Mendelsohn wrote in Rolling Stone: "George's vocal, containing less adenoids and more grainy Paul tunefulness than ever before, is one of many highlights on his 'Something,' some of the others being more excellent drum work, a dead catchy guitar line, perfectly subdued strings, and an unusually nice melody. Both his and Joe Cocker's version will suffice nicely until Ray Charles gets around to it." Writing in Saturday Review magazine, Ellen Sander described "Something" as "certainly one of the most beautiful songs George Harrison has ever written" and added: "He feels his way through the song, instinctively cutting through its body and into the core, emoting so clearly and so gracefully that at the moment he peals 'I don't know, I don't know,' it is shown that even what is not known can be understood."

According to Beatles biographer Nicholas Schaffner, "Something" showed Harrison following McCartney's populist approach and some "long-haired music critics" were repelled by the song's use of lush MOR-style orchestration. An outspoken critic of Abbey Road, The New York Times's Nik Cohn derided it and "Here Comes the Sun" as "mediocrity incarnate". By contrast, Lon Goddard of Record Mirror described the song as "another beautiful Harrison composition" in the style of "While My Guitar Gently Weeps", saying that "It leaps scales in its heavy orchestral arrangement, then drifts down to George's simple but effective guitar style."

In his review of the single, Derek Johnson of the NME lauded the track as "a real quality hunk of pop" with a "strident lead guitar which exudes a mean and moody quality". Johnson stated his regret that Harrison "isn't featured more regularly as a singer", and concluded of "Something": "It's a song that grows on you, and mark my words, it will – in a big way!" As guest singles reviewer for Melody Maker, Keef Hartley said it was "probably the best track" on Abbey Road, adding: "What I was waiting for was that guitar solo because George Harrison is just about the only guitar player I know of who can plan a solo so it doesn't sound as though it is planned."

=== Commercial performance ===
Although its commercial impact was lessened by the ongoing success of the parent album, "Something" / "Come Together" was certified Gold by the Recording Industry Association of America (RIAA) on 27 October. During the single's chart run on Billboard in the US, "Something" peaked at number 3 until the magazine changed its practice of counting sales and airplay separately for each song; following this change on 29 November, the single topped the Billboard Hot 100, for one week. "Come Together" / "Something" became the Beatles' eighteenth number 1 single in Billboard, surpassing Elvis Presley's record of seventeen. In the other US national charts, Record World listed "Something" / "Come Together" at number 1 for two weeks and "Come Together" / "Something" for the remaining three weeks at number 1, while in Cash Box magazine, which continued to rank each song separately, "Something" peaked at number 2 and "Come Together" spent three weeks at number 1.

As the preferred side, "Something" was number 1 in Canada (for five weeks), Australia (five weeks), West Germany (two weeks), New Zealand and Singapore. The combined sides reached number 4 in Britain. There, the release was highly unusual, given the traditional preference for non-album singles. In addition, according to former Mojo editor Paul Du Noyer, "so enormous were sales of Abbey Road that demand for the single was inevitably dampened."

Along with "Here Comes the Sun", "Something" was included on the Beatles' 1973 compilation album 1967–1970, thereby giving Harrison two of the four tracks representing Abbey Road. In 1976, Capitol sequenced it as the opening track of The Best of George Harrison, a compilation that, against Harrison's wishes, combined his best-known compositions from the Beatles era with his hits as a solo artist. The song was subsequently included on the band's themed compilations Love Songs and The Beatles Ballads.

On 17 February 1999, "Something" was certified double Platinum by the RIAA. In its 2014 list titled "The Beatles' 50 Biggest Billboard Hits", Billboard places the double A-side single in sixth place, immediately after "Let It Be" and ahead of "Hello, Goodbye". (Note: Additionally, "Something" is placed again at number 30, representing the song's performance before the November 1969 Hot 100 rule change.)

== Retrospective assessments and legacy ==
Harrison and Apple publicist Derek Taylor had a standing joke. Whenever either of them had an idea, they would quip "This could be the big one." "Something", written in mid-1968 on a piano in Abbey Road during a break from work on The Beatles, really did become the big one for Harrison.

— Author Ian MacDonald

Along with "Here Comes the Sun", the song established Harrison as a composer to match Lennon and McCartney. Writing in his book Revolution in the Head, author and critic Ian MacDonald described "Something" as "the acme of Harrison's achievement as a writer". MacDonald highlighted the song's "key-structure of classical grace and panoramic effect", and cited the lyrics to verse two as "its author's finest lines – at once deeper and more elegant than almost anything his colleagues ever wrote".

Like Lennon, both McCartney and Starr held the song in high regard. In the 2000 book The Beatles Anthology, Starr paired "Something" with "While My Guitar Gently Weeps" as "Two of the finest love songs ever written", adding, "they're really on a par with what John and Paul or anyone else of that time wrote"; McCartney said it was "George's greatest track – with 'Here Comes the Sun' and 'While My Guitar Gently Weeps'". Among Harrison's other peers, Paul Simon described "Something" as a "masterpiece" and Elton John said: "'Something' is probably one of the best love songs ever, ever, ever written ... It's better than 'Yesterday,' much better ... It's like the song I've been chasing for the last thirty-five years."

In a 2002 article for The Morning News, Kenneth Womack included Harrison's guitar solo on the track among his "Ten Great Beatles Moments". Describing the instrumental break as "the song's greatest lyrical feature – even more lyrical, interestingly enough, than the lyrics themselves", Womack concluded: "A masterpiece in simplicity, Harrison's solo reaches toward the sublime, wrestles with it in a bouquet of downward syncopation, and hoists it yet again in a moment of supreme grace." Guitar World included the performance as the magazine's featured solo in June 2011. Later that year, "Something" was one of the two "key tracks" highlighted by Rolling Stone when the magazine placed Harrison at number 11 on its list of the "100 Greatest Guitarists". (Note: Dave Grohl of the Foo Fighters named their 1995 song "Oh, George" after Harrison and based his guitar solo on Harrison's playing on "Something".)

In July 1970, "Something" received the Ivor Novello Award for "Best Song Musically and Lyrically" of 1969. In 2005, the British Broadcasting Corporation (BBC) named it as the 64th-greatest song ever. According to the BBC, the song "shows more clearly than any other song in The Beatles' canon that there were three great songwriters in the band rather than just two". The Beatles' official website states that "Something" "underlined the ascendance of George Harrison as a major songwriting force".

"Something" became the second most covered Beatles song after "Yesterday". In 1999, Broadcast Music Incorporated (BMI) named it as the 17th-most performed song of the twentieth century, with 5 million performances. In 2000, Mojo ranked "Something" at number 14 in the magazine's list of "The 100 Greatest Songs of All Time". It was ranked 278th on Rolling Stone's 2010 list of the "500 Greatest Songs of All Time", and 110th in 2021. In 2006, Mojo placed it 7th in the list of "The 101 Greatest Beatles Songs", while four years later, the track appeared at number 6 on a similar list compiled by Rolling Stone. In 2019, the staff of Entertainment Weekly ranked "Something" at number 5 in their list of the Beatles' best songs.

== Cover versions ==
=== Shirley Bassey ===
"Something"
- A-side label of the UK single

Single by Shirley Bassey

from the album Something
- B-side: "Easy to Be Hard"
- Released: June 1970
- Genre: Pop, easy listening
- Length: 3:35
- Label: United Artists
- Songwriter: George Harrison
- Producers: Johnny Harris, Tony Colton

Among the song's many cover versions, Welsh singer Shirley Bassey recorded a successful version of "Something". It was released in 1970 as the title track to her album of the same name. Also issued as a single, it became Bassey's first top-ten hit in the UK since "I (Who Have Nothing)" in 1963, peaking at number 4 and spending 22 weeks on the chart. The single also reached the top twenty in other European countries and peaked at number 6 on Billboard's Easy Listening (later Adult Contemporary) chart.

Bassey said she had been unaware of the song's origins when recording "Something". She later suggested that she and Harrison could become a singer-and-songwriter pairing on the scale of Dionne Warwick and Burt Bacharach. After reading these comments in 1970, Harrison wrote "When Every Song Is Sung" with Bassey in mind, although she never recorded the composition.

=== Frank Sinatra ===
Frank Sinatra was particularly impressed with "Something", calling it "the greatest love song of the past 50 years", despite having long disapproved of the Beatles. According to Du Noyer, he "especially admired the way the lyric evokes a girl who isn't even present". Aside from performing "Something" numerous times in concert, Sinatra recorded the song for a single in October 1970 and then for his 1980 triple album Trilogy: Past Present Future.

During his live performances, Sinatra was said to mistakenly introduce "Something" as a Lennon–McCartney composition. Although as early as 1975, he was correctly crediting Harrison as its author. (Note: Harrison recalled that when he appeared with Michael Jackson on a BBC radio show, in 1979, the show's host referred to "Something" and Jackson said, surprised: 'Oh, you wrote that? I thought it was a Lennon–McCartney.") Harrison went on to adopt Sinatra's minor lyrical change (in the song's middle eight, singing "You stick around, Jack ...") in his live performances over 1991–92. In The Beatles Anthology, Harrison says he viewed Sinatra as being part of "the generation before me" and so only later came to appreciate the American singer's adoption of the song.

=== Other artists ===
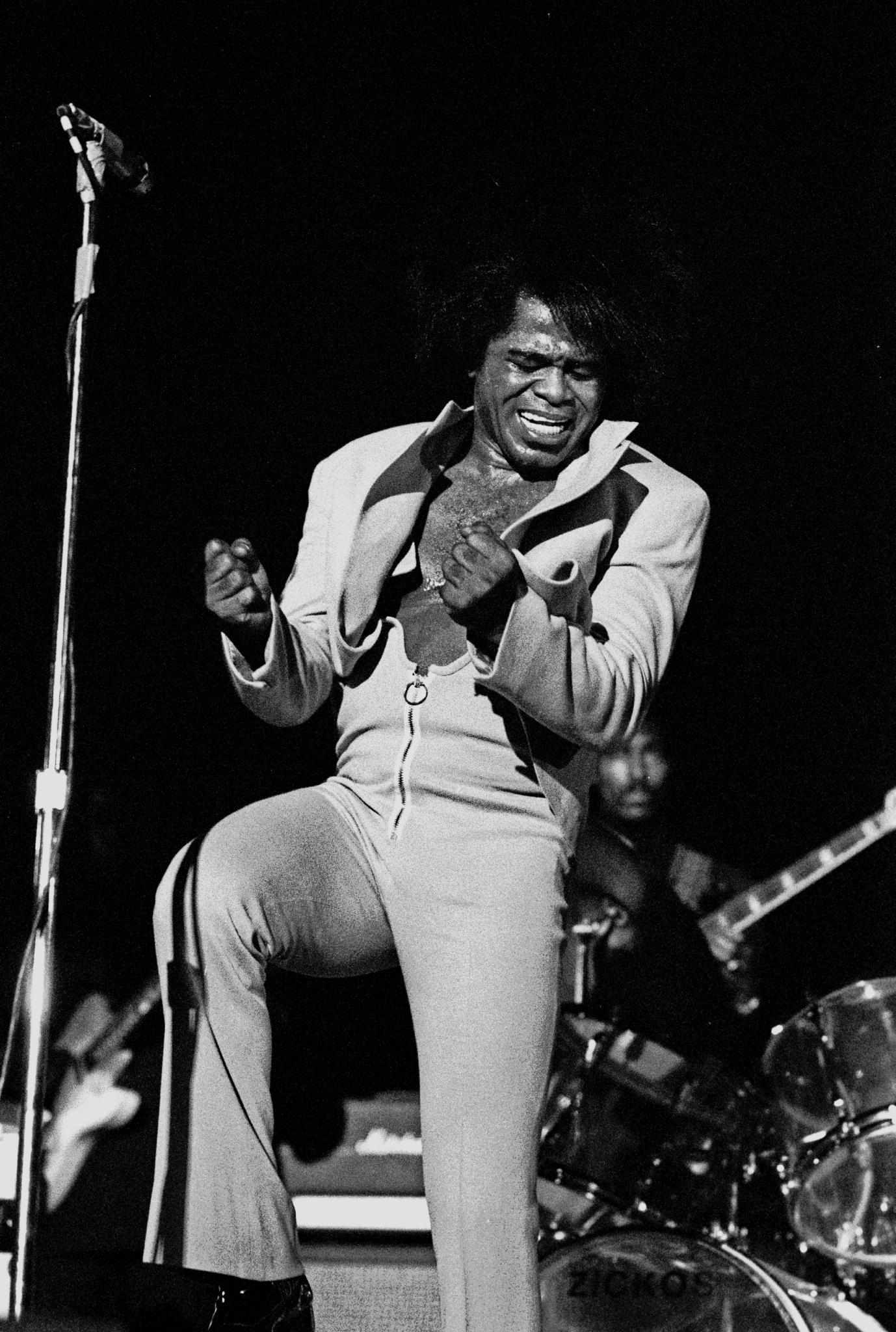
James Brown's recording was Harrison's favourite cover version of "Something".

Harrison's composition began accumulating cover versions almost immediately after the release of Abbey Road, starting with Joe Cocker's recording. The song became a standard and was readily adapted by artists in a wide range of styles, including easy-listening and instrumental jazz. In Nicholas Schaffner's description, the many interpretations made the song ubiquitous "from the Borscht Belt to the dentist's waiting room".

Lena Horne recorded "Something" in the jazz style for her 1970 album with guitarist Gabor Szabo, titled Lena & Gabor. An instrumental version by Booker T. & the M.G.'s, from their Abbey Road tribute album McLemore Avenue, peaked at number 76 on the Billboard Hot 100 in August 1970. The R&B groups the O'Jays and Smokey Robinson and the Miracles also covered it, as did easy-listening stars such as Bert Kaempfert and Liberace. Fulfilling Harrison's hopes, Ray Charles issued a version on his 1971 album Volcanic Action of My Soul. However, Harrison said he was really disappointed: "The bridge to it, he sings great. But it was a bit of a corny sort of way he did it."

Referring to the song's adoption by easy-listening artists, Harrison later said: "When even Liberace covered it [in 1970], you know that it's one of them that ends up in an elevator ..." Harrison attributed its popularity among other artists to the easily mastered, five-note melody. Du Noyer partly refutes this explanation, saying that it was equally a vehicle for "the most advanced vocalists" such as Peggy Lee, along with Sinatra and Bassey.

At the time I wasn't particularly thrilled that Frank Sinatra did "Something" … I was more interested when Smokey Robinson did it and when James Brown did it. But I'm very pleased now, whoever's done it. I realise that the sign of a good song is when it has lots of cover versions.

— George Harrison, 2000

"Something" was one of the very few Beatles songs that Elvis Presley chose to play; Lewisohn highlights his interpretation among the "dozens of high-profile covers". Presley performed it on his 1973 Aloha from Hawaii TV special, the recording from which appeared on the accompanying bestselling album. A version from Presley's August 1970 Las Vegas concert season subsequently appeared on the box sets Walk a Mile in My Shoes: The Essential '70s Masters (1995) and Live in Las Vegas (2001). In 1974, a recording by Johnny Rodriguez reached number 6 on Billboard's Hot Country Singles chart and number 85 on the Hot 100. In Canada, Rodriguez's single peaked at number 11 on the RPM country chart.

By 1972, over 150 artists had recorded "Something". In his 1996 Harrison biography The Quiet One, Alan Clayson said the song had attracted "nearly 200 cover versions". In 1972, Harrison told music journalist Mike Hennessey that the Robinson and Cocker versions were among his favourites. In later interviews, he said that the best cover version was a recording by James Brown, in which the singer declares "I got to believe in something!" over the main riff. Harrison commented that the recording was relatively obscure in Brown's catalogue: "It was one of his B-sides. I have it on my jukebox at home. It's absolutely brilliant."

=== Harrison tributes ===
Bruce Springsteen opened his first show after Harrison's death on 29 November 2001 by playing "Something", followed by a rendition of Harrison's solo hit "My Sweet Lord". Elton John gave a solo performance of the song at New York's Carnegie Hall in April 2002, as part of a one-hour Harrison tribute during the eleventh annual Rainforest Foundation concert.

In honour of Harrison's fondness for the instrument, Paul McCartney played a ukulele rendition of "Something" throughout his 2002–03 world tour and included the track on his Back in the U.S. live album. At the Concert for George, held at London's Royal Albert Hall on 29 November 2002, he and Eric Clapton performed a version that began with McCartney alone on ukulele, then reverted to the familiar rock arrangement with Clapton taking over as lead singer and backing from Starr, Preston and others. Following its appearance in David Leland's film Concert for George (2003) and on the accompanying live album, this performance of "Something" was nominated for the Grammy Award for Best Pop Collaboration with Vocals.

Bob Dylan also played the song live during his November 2002 concerts, as a tribute to Harrison. McCartney continued to perform "Something", adopting the Concert for George mix of ukulele and rock backing. A version with this musical arrangement was included on his 2009 album Good Evening New York City.

== Live performances by Harrison ==
Harrison played "Something" at the two Concert for Bangladesh shows, held at Madison Square Garden in New York on 1 August 1971. His first live performance as a solo artist, he was backed by a large band that included Starr, Preston, Clapton and Leon Russell. The version used on the live album and in the 1972 concert film was taken from the evening show that day, when Harrison played it as the final song before returning to perform "Bangla Desh" as an encore.

Harrison included "Something" in all of his subsequent, and rare, full-length concert appearances. For his 1974 North American tour with Ravi Shankar, he had been reluctant to feature any material from the Beatles' catalogue, but at the urging of Shankar and Preston during rehearsals, he added "Something" to the setlist. To the disappointment of many fans, he chose to alter some of the song's lyrics (such as changing the first line to "If there's something in the way, remove it"). Further distancing himself from the Beatles' legacy, Harrison told journalists at the start of the tour that he would join a group with Lennon "any day" but rejected the idea of working again with McCartney, since he preferred Willie Weeks as a bassist. MacDonald comments that this statement was likely in reference to McCartney's "too fussily extemporised" bass part on the Beatles' 1969 recording. With Boyd having left Harrison for Clapton earlier in 1974, Larry Sloman of Rolling Stone described the reworked "Something" as "a moving diary of his love life".

A version from Harrison's December 1991 tour of Japan with Clapton – Harrison's only other tour as a solo artist – appears on the Live in Japan double album (1992). Inglis writes of the track having "extra poignancy" by this time, "in that the woman for whom it was written had been married to, and divorced from, Harrison and Clapton in turn". Inglis adds: "It is not a new interpretation of the song, but it does suggest a new perspective, in which words and music are used by two close friends to reflect on the lives they have led."

== Personnel ==
According to Walter Everett, Bruce Spizer and Kenneth Womack:

The Beatles

- George Harrison – lead vocal, lead and rhythm guitars
- John Lennon – piano
- Paul McCartney – bass guitar, backing vocal
- Ringo Starr – drums

Additional musicians

- Billy Preston – Hammond organ
- George Martin – string arrangement
- Unidentified session musicians – twelve violins, four violas, four cellos, string bass

== Charts and certifications ==
=== Beatles version ===
Chart (1969–1970)	Peak position
Australian Go-Set National Top 40 Singles	1
Austrian Singles Chart	11
Canadian RPM 100 Singles	1
Finnish Suomen Virallinen Lista	12
Irish Singles Chart	3
New Zealand Listener Chart	1
Norwegian VG-lista Singles	2
Swedish Kvällstoppen Chart	5
Swedish Tio i Topp Chart	4
UK Singles Chart	4
US Billboard Hot 100	1
US Billboard Easy Listening	17
US Cash Box Top 100	2
West German Musikmarkt Hit-Parade	1

Chart (2015)	Peak position
Sweden Heatseeker (Sverigetopplistan)	11

Chart (2019)	Peak position
US Hot Rock & Alternative Songs (Billboard)	12

=== Shirley Bassey version ===
Chart (1970–1971)	Peak position
Australian Go-Set National Top 60 Singles	47
Austrian Singles Chart	19
Belgian Ultratop Singles Chart	11
Dutch MegaChart Singles	10
French SNEP Singles Chart	34
Irish Singles Chart	13
UK Singles Chart	4
US Billboard Hot 100	55
US Billboard Easy Listening	6
West German Media Control Singles Chart	40

=== Certifications (Beatles version) ===
Region	Certification	Certified units/sales
Spain (Promusicae)	Gold	30,000^{‡}
New Zealand (RMNZ)	Platinum	30,000^{‡}
United Kingdom (BPI)	Platinum	600,000^{‡}
United States (RIAA)	2× Platinum	2,000,000^{^}
^{^} Shipments figures based on certification alone.^{‡} Sales+streaming figures based on certification alone.

== Sources ==
- Allison, Dale C. Jr (2006). The Love There That's Sleeping: The Art and Spirituality of George Harrison. New York, NY: Continuum. ISBN 978-0-8264-1917-0.
- Badman, Keith (2001). The Beatles Diary Volume 2: After the Break-Up 1970–2001. London: Omnibus Press. ISBN 978-0-7119-8307-6.
- The Beatles (2000). The Beatles Anthology. San Francisco, CA: Chronicle Books. ISBN 0-8118-2684-8.
- Boyd, Pattie; with Junor, Penny (2007). Wonderful Today: The Autobiography. London: Headline Review. ISBN 978-0-7553-1646-5.
- Castleman, Harry; Podrazik, Walter J. (1976). All Together Now: The First Complete Beatles Discography 1961–1975. New York, NY: Ballantine Books. ISBN 0-345-25680-8.
- Clayson, Alan (2003). George Harrison. London: Sanctuary. ISBN 1-86074-489-3.
- Doggett, Peter (2011). You Never Give Me Your Money: The Beatles After the Breakup. New York, NY: It Books. ISBN 978-0-06-177418-8.
- The Editors of Rolling Stone (2002). Harrison. New York, NY: Rolling Stone Press. ISBN 978-0-7432-3581-5.
- Everett, Walter (1999). The Beatles as Musicians: Revolver Through the Anthology. New York, NY: Oxford University Press. ISBN 0-19-509553-7.
- Greene, Joshua M. (2006). Here Comes the Sun: The Spiritual and Musical Journey of George Harrison. Hoboken, NJ: John Wiley & Sons. ISBN 978-0-470-12780-3.
- Harrison, George (2002) [1980]. I, Me, Mine. San Francisco, CA: Chronicle Books. ISBN 978-0-8118-5900-4.
- Harry, Bill (2003). The George Harrison Encyclopedia. London: Virgin Books. ISBN 978-0-7535-0822-0.
- Hertsgaard, Mark (1996). A Day in the Life: The Music and Artistry of the Beatles. London: Pan Books. ISBN 0-330-33891-9.
- Hoffmann, Frank (1983). The Cash Box Singles Charts, 1950–1981. Metuchen, NJ: The Scarecrow Press. ISBN 978-0-8108-1595-7.
- Hunt, Chris, ed. (2005). NME Originals: Beatles – The Solo Years 1970–1980. London: IPC Ignite!.
- Huntley, Elliot J. (2006). Mystical One: George Harrison – After the Break-up of the Beatles. Toronto, ON: Guernica Editions. ISBN 978-1-55071-197-4.
- Ingham, Chris (2006). The Rough Guide to the Beatles. London: Rough Guides/Penguin. ISBN 978-1-84836-525-4.
- Inglis, Ian (2010). The Words and Music of George Harrison. Santa Barbara, CA: Praeger. ISBN 978-0-313-37532-3.
- Lavezzoli, Peter (2006). The Dawn of Indian Music in the West. New York, NY: Continuum. ISBN 0-8264-2819-3.
- Leng, Simon (2006). While My Guitar Gently Weeps: The Music of George Harrison. Milwaukee, WI: Hal Leonard. ISBN 978-1-4234-0609-9.
- Lewisohn, Mark (2005) [1988]. The Complete Beatles Recording Sessions: The Official Story of the Abbey Road Years 1962–1970. London: Bounty Books. ISBN 978-0-7537-2545-0.
- MacDonald, Ian (1998). Revolution in the Head: The Beatles' Records and the Sixties. London: Pimlico. ISBN 0-7126-6697-4.
- Madinger, Chip; Easter, Mark (2000). Eight Arms to Hold You: The Solo Beatles Compendium. Chesterfield, MO: 44.1 Productions. ISBN 0-615-11724-4.
- Miles, Barry (2001). The Beatles Diary Volume 1: The Beatles Years. London: Omnibus Press. ISBN 0-7119-8308-9.
- Mojo Special Limited Edition: 1000 Days of Revolution (The Beatles' Final Years – Jan 1, 1968 to Sept 27, 1970). London: Emap. 2003.
- Perone, James E. (2012). The Album: A Guide to Pop Music's Most Provocative, Influential and Important Creations. Santa Barbara, CA: Praeger. ISBN 978-0-313-37906-2.
- Romanowski, Patricia; George-Warren, Holly, eds. (1995). The New Rolling Stone Encyclopedia of Rock & Roll. New York, NY: Fireside/Rolling Stone Press. ISBN 0-684-81044-1.
- Schaffner, Nicholas (1978). The Beatles Forever. New York, NY: McGraw-Hill. ISBN 0-07-055087-5.
- Sheff, David (2010) [1981]. All We Are Saying: The Last Major Interview with John Lennon and Yoko Ono. London: Macmillan. ISBN 978-1-4299-5808-0.
- Simpson, Paul (2004). The Rough Guide to Elvis. London: Rough Guides. ISBN 1-84353-417-7.
- Sounes, Howard (2010). Fab: An Intimate Life of Paul McCartney. London: HarperCollins. ISBN 978-0-00-723705-0.
- Spizer, Bruce (2003). The Beatles on Apple Records. New Orleans, LA: 498 Productions. ISBN 0-9662649-4-0.
- Spizer, Bruce (2005). The Beatles Solo on Apple Records. New Orleans, LA: 498 Productions. ISBN 0-9662649-5-9.
- Sullivan, Steve (2013). Encyclopedia of Great Popular Song Recordings, Volume 2. Lanham, MD: Scarecrow Press. ISBN 978-0-8108-8296-6.
- Sulpy, Doug; Schweighardt, Ray (1997). Get Back: The Unauthorized Chronicle of The Beatles' Let It Be Disaster. New York, NY: St. Martin's Griffin. ISBN 0-312-19981-3.
- Tillery, Gary (2011). Working Class Mystic: A Spiritual Biography of George Harrison. Wheaton, IL: Quest Books. ISBN 978-0-8356-0900-5.
- Unterberger, Richie (2006). The Unreleased Beatles: Music & Film. San Francisco, CA: Backbeat Books. ISBN 978-0-87930-892-6.
- Weber, Erin Torkelson (2016). The Beatles and the Historians: An Analysis of Writings About the Fab Four. Jefferson, NC: McFarland. ISBN 978-1-4766-6266-4.
- Winn, John C. (2009). That Magic Feeling: The Beatles' Recorded Legacy, Volume Two, 1966–1970. New York, NY: Three Rivers Press. ISBN 978-0-307-45239-9.
- Woffinden, Bob (1981). The Beatles Apart. London: Proteus. ISBN 0-906071-89-5.
- Womack, Kenneth (2006) [2002]. "Ten Great Beatles Moments". In Skinner Sawyers, June (ed.). Read the Beatles: Classic and New Writings on the Beatles, Their Legacy, and Why They Still Matter. London: Penguin. ISBN 978-0-14-303732-3.
- Womack, Kenneth (2014). The Beatles Encyclopedia: Everything Fab Four. Santa Barbara, CA: ABC-CLIO. ISBN 978-0-313-39171-2.
- Womack, Kenneth (2019). Solid State: The Story of Abbey Road and the End of the Beatles. Ithaca, NY: Cornell University Press. ISBN 978-1-5017-4685-7.
