= Bless This House =

Bless This House may refer to:

- Bless This House (British TV series), a 1971–1976 British sitcom
  - Bless This House (film), a 1972 film spin-off of the above
- Bless This House (American TV series), a 1995–1996 American sitcom
- "Bless This House" (song), a 1927 song written by Helen Taylor
