= Eric Roberts (spy) =

British double agent (1907–1972)

Eric Arthur Roberts (18 June 1907 – 17 or 18 December 1972) was an MI5 agent during the Second World War under the alias Jack King. By posing as a Gestapo agent and infiltrating fascist groups in the UK, Roberts was able to prevent secret information from finding its way to Germany. Roberts continued to work for the British security services after the war, particularly in Vienna, but it was a time of great anxiety in the services because of the suspicions surrounding double agents such as the Cambridge spy ring.

Roberts never felt completely accepted by MI5 because of his social background, and a desk role did not suit him as well as his wartime role had. He is the subject of the biography Agent Jack (2018) by Robert Hutton, and his adventures were the inspiration for the novel Our Friends In Berlin by Anthony Quinn and for a major character in the novel Transcription by Kate Atkinson.

== Background ==
Roberts was born in Wivelsfield, East Sussex, in June 1907, the son of Percival Arthur Garfield Roberts and his wife Maud (née Green). At the time of the 1911 Census the family was living in Penzance, Cornwall, where his father worked for the Western Union Cable Company. He attended a grammar school, and spoke fluent Spanish and some German, and had taken holidays in Germany in 1932 and 1934. He married Alice Lilian Audrey Sprague (born 1900 in Droylsden, Lancashire), the daughter of William Sprague, a railway civil engineer, and his wife Margaret, in spring 1934. The couple set up home in Epsom, Surrey.

== Career ==
=== MI5 work before and during the Second World War ===
Roberts was recruited in the 1920s as an MI5 field agent to infiltrate first communist and then fascist groups by the spymaster Maxwell Knight. In the 1930s he was tasked to infiltrate the British Union of Fascists. By day he continued to work as a clerk for the Westminster Bank in London. After the bank was asked to release him for war service one of his bosses wrote back expressing surprise at the choice of someone so unremarkable for important work: "what are the particular and especial qualifications of Mr Roberts – which we have not been able to perceive – for some particular work of national military importance which would take him away from his normal military call-up in October?"

By 1942, Roberts was posing as a German Gestapo agent named "Jack King", a member of the Einsatzgruppe London, to obtain information about Nazi sympathisers in the UK. There had been speculation that King was John Bingham, until the release of files by MI5 in October 2014. Documents in the UK National Archives have now shown that Roberts ran a hugely dangerous and very successful deception.

As Jack King, he was in direct contact with six men and women who believed he was working for the Germans, and gave him information on "scores and probably hundreds" of Nazi sympathisers in the UK. Hardened spies were "astonished" by the treachery he unearthed. Originally his mission was to infiltrate Siemens-Schuckert (GB) Ltd, the suspect British arm of the German company, until he met a "crafty and dangerous woman" named Marita Perigoe. Although MI5 believed her to be "of mixed Swedish and German origin", she was in fact born in London, the daughter of the Australian composer May Brahe. Perigoe was married to a member of Oswald Mosley's British Union of Fascists, but saw them as "insufficiently extreme". MI5 reported that "She was found to be so violently anti-British and so anxious to do anything in her power to help the enemy that it was felt that special attention should be paid to her." Another Nazi sympathiser, Hilda Leech, passed on reports about secret research being undertaken to develop a jet aircraft. An astrologer, Edgar Whitehead, gave details about secret trials of a new amphibious tank. The naturalised British citizen Hans Kohout uncovered information about secret British tactics to evade air defences and passed it on to Jack King.

According to Roberts, writing in his reports back to MI5, some of the fifth column fascists he dealt with had such hatred for Britain, driven by anti-semitism and the propaganda of Mosley’s group, that they "applauded" women and children being killed by German bombs.

Roberts was able to prevent the passing on of sensitive information to Germany. His detailed and extensive groundwork produced a list of 500 names of people of interest to MI5.

=== Postwar espionage (MI6) ===
In 1947, Roberts was seconded to the Secret Intelligence Service (MI6) to work in Vienna, posing as a British civil servant and passing information to a Soviet agent, Jellinek. This low-grade, accurate but harmless information passed to enemy spies he described as "chicken feed", a term also used by the spy writer John le Carré. At the time Vienna was a very dangerous place full of spies from all sides. Roberts wrote about some of the dangers he faced every day in his work in Austria. In one incident he waited for an arranged meeting at a cemetery in the city and narrowly avoided being picked up by a Soviet ZiL car.

In contrast to the brilliance of Roberts' work before and during the war, he had effectively been moved to a much less demanding and stimulating desk job, which caused him to become depressed. His work at this point was viewed much less favourably by his superiors in MI5 and MI6.

=== Cambridge spy ring ===
On returning to London, Roberts asked his friend Guy Liddell, deputy director of MI5, about a double agent who had been uncovered in Vienna. Roberts told him that he thought it likely that there would be a mole in MI5, and that anyone who had the right background, and was a member of the correct clubs, would be above suspicion. He suggested that such a spy would probably be motivated by ideology rather than financial gain. Following this conversation Roberts felt that he himself had come under suspicion.

After the Cambridge spy ring, a group of double agents including Guy Burgess, Donald Maclean and Kim Philby, were discovered by MI5, Roberts, who was then in Canada, was visited by Barry Russell Jones of MI5, who asked him about any suspicions he might have about his former colleagues. Roberts gave him the name "Tony", referring to Anthony Blunt, who had already been identified as a member of the spy ring. Roberts was reportedly traumatised by Russell Jones's visit. It appears that he had had doubts about Blunt from a very early stage and had tried to raise his concerns in 1941.

In a 14-page letter sent in 1969 to Harry Lee of MI5, Roberts wrote of his anxiety and frustration about his time in the service, and stated that he believed he had been followed and spied on by agents in London. He also wrote that he had not felt accepted by colleagues in MI5, since he had been educated at a state grammar school, not at a public school, and was not a university graduate. Harry Lee replied to Roberts, apologising for the visit in Canada and assuring him that he had not been under suspicion and had not been followed.

== Life after MI5 ==
Roberts retired from MI5 in 1956, at the age of 49. He then lived in Nettlestone on the Isle of Wight before emigrating to Canada, where he eventually settled in Ganges, Salt Spring Island, British Columbia.

Roberts was a freeman of the City of London, and wrote and published one book, Salt Spring Saga (1962).

He died on 17 or 18 December 1972, leaving a widow Audrey, two sons (Maxwell, born 17 January 1936, and Peter), a daughter (Crista McDonald), three grandchildren and two sisters.

== See also ==
- Fifth Column (intelligence operation)
- John Bingham, 7th Baron Clanmorris
