= Something Else (Shirley Bassey album) =

Studio album by Shirley Bassey
- Released: May 1971
- Studios: Advision Studios, London
- Genre: MOR
- Length: 41:24
- Label: United Artists
- Producers: Noel Rogers, Johnny Harris

Shirley Bassey chronology
Something (1970)	Something Else (1971)	I Capricorn (1972)

Professional ratings
Review scores
Source	Rating
AllMusic	3/5 stars

Something Else is a 1971 album by Shirley Bassey.

Following-up her comeback album Something, this proved to be almost as big when it too made the UK top 10, peaking at No.7. The album contained the hit single "(Where Do I Begin?) Love Story" as well as a non-charting second release "Breakfast in Bed". The success of this album and Shirley Bassey in general at this period saw a rush of compilations and older albums entering the UK charts in late 1971, with five albums appearing over the space of three months. In 1972, Bassey was the subject of This Is Your Life where guest Liberace made mention of this album and in particular "Excuse Me".

The gatefold photograph features Bassey wearing a chiffon catsuit. The early 1970s would see Bassey wearing some of her most revealing stage costumes, as reflected on the cover.

In France, the album was released as Love Songs with an alternative sleeve and also featured the song "For All We Know". Something Else was released on vinyl and cassette in stereo. It was re-issued on CD in 1999 by EMI with two bonus tracks; "For the Love of Him" was originally the B-side of "(Where Do I Begin) Love Story", while "Vehicle", recorded in February 1971, remained unreleased until 1994.

== Track listing ==
Side One

1. "(Where Do I Begin) Love Story" (Francis Lai, Carl Sigman) - 3:15
2. "'Til Love Touches Your Life" (Riz Ortolani, Arthur Hamilton) - 3:43
3. "Easy Thing to Do" (Johnny Harris, John Bromley) - 4:23
4. "Until It's Time for You to Go" (Buffy Saint-Marie) - 4:06
5. "It's Impossible (Somos Novios)" (Armando Manzanero) - 2:44
6. "What's Done is Done" (Ed Welch) - 3:00

Side Two

1. "Pieces of Dreams" (Michel Legrand, Alan and Marilyn Bergman) - 2:44
2. "Breakfast in Bed" (Eddie Hinton, Donnie Fritts) - 3:39
3. "Excuse Me" (Dick Addrisi, Don Addrisi) - 2:27
4. "Bridge Over Troubled Water" (Paul Simon) - 5:08
5. "I'm Not There" (Sheila Davis, Michael Leonard) - 3:00
6. "I'd Like to Hate Myself in the Morning (And Raise a Little Hell Tonight)" (John Meyer) - 2:44

CD bonus tracks:

1. "For the Love of Him" (Bobbi Martin, Al Mortimer)
2. "Vehicle" (Jim Peterik)

== Personnel ==
- Shirley Bassey – vocals
- Johnny Harris – arranger and conductor
- Ed Offord – engineer

== Charts ==
Chart peaks for Something Else
Chart (1972)	Peak position
US Billboard Top LPs	123
UK Official Albums Chart	7
