= Murder Off the Record =

1957 novel

- First edition
- Author: John Bingham
- Original title: Marilyn
- Language: English
- Genre: Thriller
- Publisher: Gollancz
- Publication date: 1957
- Publication place: United Kingdom
- Media type: Print

Murder Off the Record is a 1957 thriller novel by the British writer John Bingham. It is also known by the alternative title Marion.

== Adaptation ==
In 1962 the novel was adapted for an episode of the television series Alfred Hitchcock Presents entitled Captive Audience, starring James Mason and Angie Dickinson.

== Bibliography ==
- Reilly, John M. Twentieth Century Crime & Mystery Writers. Springer, 2015.
