= The Paton Street Case =

1955 novel by John Bingham

- First edition (US) with alternative title
- Author: John Bingham
- Language: English
- Genre: Mystery
- Publisher: Gollancz (UK); Dodd, Mead (US)
- Publication date: 1955
- Publication place: United Kingdom
- Media type: Print

The Paton Street Case is a 1955 mystery crime novel by the British writer John Bingham. It was published in New York by Dodd Mead with the alternative title of Inspector Morgan's Dilemma.

== Synopsis ==
Police investigating a suspected arson attack at 127 Paton Street discover a body in the first floor flat.

== Bibliography ==
- Reilly, John M. Twentieth Century Crime & Mystery Writers. Springer, 2015.
