= John Bingham, 7th Baron Clanmorris =

British writer (1908–1988)

The Right Honourable The Lord Clanmorris
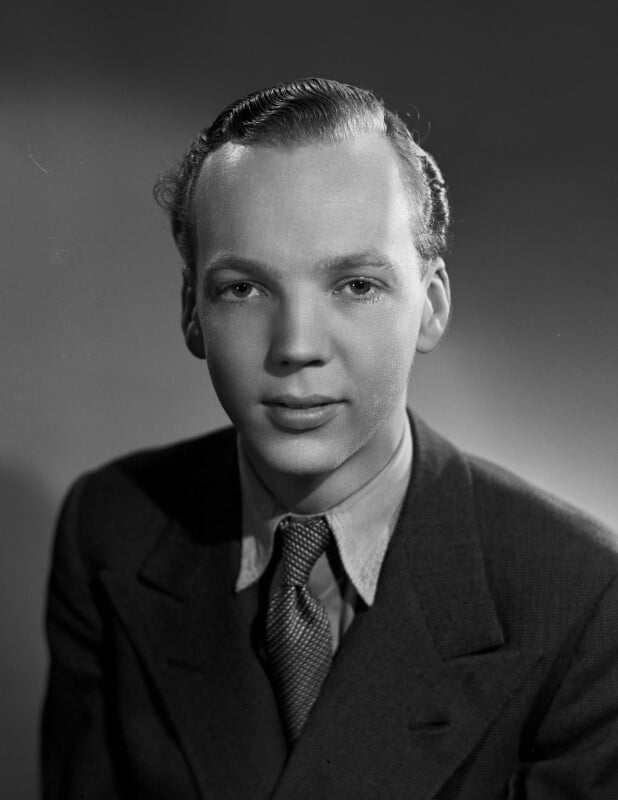
- Bingham in 1945
- Born: John Michael Ward Bingham; 3 November 1908; Haywards Heath, Sussex, England
- Died: 6 August 1988 (aged 79)
- Occupation: Novelist
- Spouse: Madeleine Mary Ebel (1934–1988)
- Children: Simon John Ward Bingham, 8th Baron Clanmorris (b. 1937); Charlotte Bingham (b. 1942)

John Michael Ward Bingham, 7th Baron Clanmorris (3 November 1908 – 6 August 1988) was a one time MI5 counterspy and an English novelist who published 17 thrillers, detective novels, and spy novels.

== Personal life ==
Bingham was the son of Arthur Bingham, 6th Baron Clanmorris, and Mowbray Leila Cloete. He was educated at Cheltenham College, and married Madeleine Mary Ebel, daughter of Clement Ebel, on 28 July 1934. His wife worked for the security services and was a playwright and biographer. Bingham fought in the Second World War with the Royal Engineers, and was attached to the General Staff. He succeeded as 7th Baron Clanmorris on 24 June 1960.

== Background ==
During the Second World War and for two decades after 1950, Bingham worked for MI5, and had long been said to be the inspiration for John le Carré's character George Smiley. In 1999, le Carré confirmed that Bingham had been an inspiration for Smiley and went further in 2000, writing in an introduction to a reissue of one of Bingham's novels: "He had been one of two men who had gone into the making of George Smiley. Nobody who knew John and the work he was doing could have missed the description of Smiley in my first novel". John le Carré wrote that Bingham encouraged him to write his first novel, Call for the Dead (1961), and to remain an active MI5 officer whilst doing so; and in a BBC Radio Front Row interview in 2009, said that Bingham's successful thriller novels, published when the two men worked together at MI5 in the 1950s, inspired him to write his first two books.

=== Jack King speculation ===
In February 2014, MI5 released files at the National Archives on the "Fifth Column" operation, which aimed to identify British Nazi sympathizers during the Second World War. Some newspapers named Bingham as the agent, known as "Jack King", at the heart of the operation, but the release of more files in October 2014 corrected this, and named the agent as Eric Roberts, a former bank clerk from Epsom.

Bingham was recruited into MI5 by Maxwell Knight to work in the counter-intelligence and political infiltration-based M Section. He had volunteered to serve in the army, but a sight defect prevented him from serving in the field. Prior to his service in MI5, Bingham had been the art editor of the Sunday Dispatch.

Bingham's first novel, My Name Is Michael Sibley (1952), was unusual for its time in suggesting that the British police might not always play fairly.

== Selected publications ==
=== Crime fiction ===
- My Name Is Michael Sibley (1952)
- Five Roundabouts to Heaven (1953) a.k.a. The Tender Poisoner
  - television version: The Tender Poisoner episode of The Alfred Hitchcock Hour (1962)
  - film version: Married Life (2007)
- The Third Skin (1954) a.k.a. Murder is a Witch
- The Paton Street Case (1955) a.k.a. Inspector Morgan’s Dilemma
- Murder Off the Record (1957) a.k.a. Marion
  - television version: Captive Audience episode of The Alfred Hitchcock Hour (1962)
- Murder Plan Six (1958)
- Night's Black Agent (1961)
- A Case of Libel (1963)
- A Fragment of Fear (1965)
  - film version: Fragment of Fear (1970)
- The Double Agent (1966)
- I Love, I Kill (1968) a.k.a. Good Old Charlie
- Vulture in the Sun (1971)
- God's Defector (1976) a.k.a. Ministry of Death
- The Marriage Bureau Murders (1977)
- Deadly Picnic (1980)
- Brock (1981)
- Brock and the Defector (1982)

=== Non Fiction ===
- The Hunting Down of Peter Manuel (1973) (written in association with ex-Detective Superintendent William Muncie)

Peerage of Ireland
Preceded by Arthur Morris Robert Bingham	Baron Clanmorris; 1960–1988	Succeeded by Simon John Ward Bingham
