= Transcription (Atkinson novel) =

Novel by Kate Atkinson

- First edition (UK)
- Author: Kate Atkinson
- Cover artist: Kate Costello Ltd
- Language: English
- Published: 2018
- Publisher: Doubleday (UK); Little, Brown (US)
- Media type: Print (hardcover, paperback)
- Pages: 352
- ISBN: 9780316176637

Transcription is a spy novel by British novelist Kate Atkinson, published in September 2018.

The novel focuses on the activities of British orphan Juliet Armstrong throughout World War II and afterwards. She begins a career as a low-level transcriptionist for MI5, before rising through the ranks. After the war she moves to the BBC.

== Summary ==
In 1950, Juliet Armstrong, a producer of children's programmes at the BBC, sees Godfrey Toby, a man she knew during WWII. When she approaches him he denies knowing her.

The incident causes Juliet to reflect back to 1940 when she was a young 18-year-old woman who had recently been orphaned. Hired to work at MI5, she is quickly scouted for an operation run by the elusive Perry Gibbons. Working out of two flats, the MI5 team reveal that they are spying on a group of low-level Nazi sympathisers who report to MI5 spy Godfrey Toby, believing he is a secret spy for the Gestapo. The walls are bugged with microphones and Juliet's job is to transcribe the audio recordings of their conversations.

Juliet develops a crush on Perry, who seems to encourage speculation that they are having an affair but does not return her affections. Instead he recruits her to ingratiate herself to a woman named Mrs. Scaife, hoping that she will lead them to the Red Book, a rumoured ledger containing the names of influential Nazi sympathisers. Juliet is given the false name Iris Carter-Jenkins. She is also approached by Oliver Alleyne, Perry's boss, who asks her to spy on Godfrey. Juliet does so, but despite noticing Godfrey acting suspiciously does not report back to Oliver.

While searching for the Red Book in Mrs. Scaife's house Juliet accidentally leaves behind her handbag, containing her real identity card, and asks Mrs. Scaife's maid, an orphan named Beatrice Dodd, to help cover for her.

A few days later, Perry proposes to Juliet, who doesn't realise he is gay. The following morning Juliet is sought out by the police who believed she was dead as they found the body of a young woman with her identification papers. Juliet realises that the body is Beatrice Dodd and is frightened as the location her body was found in was one mentioned by Godfrey Toby's Nazi sympathisers. A few days later, Juliet takes part in a sting operation during which Mrs. Scaife is arrested.

By 1950, Juliet is working at the BBC. After the war, the operation, and her relationship with Perry, had quickly dissolved. However, she still has MI5 ties and allows her apartment to be used as a safe house for Soviet defectors. At work she receives an anonymous note saying 'you will pay for what you have done'. Juliet grows paranoid, believing the note comes from one of Godrey's recruits. During the war she had been involved with a murder. In a flashback, we are told that after Mrs. Scaife's arrest, Juliet, Cyril and Godfrey were involved in killing Dolly, one of the low-level Nazi sympathisers, after she accidentally discovered their operation. However, Juliet shot to disable her, and it was Godfrey who 'finished her off'. None of the other living members of the circle ever discovered Miller's involvement.

On her way home from the BBC Juliet is attacked, but is relieved to find that her attacker is a former spy named Nelly Varga who was persuaded to work for MI5 after they kidnapped her dog, a dog Juliet was put in charge of which later died.

Returning home Juliet finds a mysterious visitor waiting for her, a man she had seen leaving messages for Godfrey's, and she now realises she was being spied on for years by MI5. The reader learns that she was a double agent for the Soviets, recruited at her MI5 interview. She had photographed documents in the case of a Czech defector when he slept in her supposedly safe house. Godfrey's colleague persuades her to betray her Soviet handlers. Juliet realises she will never truly be free of either party.

She tries to escape but is quickly caught at Dover train station by MI5 agents. However, Nelly Varga attacks her a second time, and the two agents are disoriented allowing Juliet to escape. Perry picks her up in his car and drives her to Lowestoft where she gets a trawler to Holland. Thirty years later, MI5 forcibly repatriates her to help flush out other Soviet spies, including Oliver Alleyne. By this time she has an adult son.

In 1981, shortly after being repatriated, Juliet is hit by a car and dies.

== Characters ==
=== Main characters ===
- Juliet Armstrong, an employee of MI5 and later the BBC, spy name is Iris Carter-Jenkins.
- Godfrey Toby, alias of an MI5 agent posing as a British operative for the Gestapo, under whom Armstrong works. His real name is John Hazeldine.
- Peregrine "Perry" Gibbons, Juliet's and Toby's superior at MI5.

=== Other characters ===
- Oliver Alleyne, Gibbons' superior at MI5.
- Myles Merton, hired Armstrong to work with Toby and Perry

== Inspiration ==
Atkinson said in an author's note that she was partly inspired by the story of Eric Roberts, an MI5 officer who spent the Second World War masquerading as a Gestapo officer in London, running a group of British fascists who believed themselves to be German spies, in what was known as the Fifth Column operation.

== Reception ==
Time magazine called Transcription "Fall's Must Read Novel". Lisa Allardyce, writing for The Guardian, viewed it as continuing "the puzzle-making of a mystery with the historical settings of her other fiction". Stephanie Merritt, reviewing it for the same newspaper, called it "a fine example of Atkinson’s mature work; an unapologetic novel of ideas, which is also wise, funny and paced like a spy thriller". The Spectator's Kate Webb called it "a contemporary version of a ripping good yarn". Jonathan Dee, reviewing for The New Yorker, commented on Atkinson's "witty, functionally elegant style". Jennifer Egan, for The New York Times, highlighted Atkinson's "unexpected and inspired" use of comedy in the first half of the novel, but viewed Juliet as becoming "cipherlike" in the later stages.
