= Vulture in the Sun =

1971 novel

- First edition
- Author: John Bingham
- Language: English
- Genre: Thriller
- Publisher: Gollancz
- Publication date: 1971
- Publication place: United Kingdom
- Media type: Print

Vulture in the Sun is a 1971 spy thriller novel by the British writer John Bingham. The protagonist is an agent of British intelligence operating out of Cyprus. It features the fictional head of British intelligence Ducane, who recurs in several of the author's novels.

== Bibliography ==
- Reilly, John M. Twentieth Century Crime & Mystery Writers. Springer, 2015.
