= A Fragment of Fear =

1965 novel by John Bingham

- First edition (UK)
- Author: John Bingham
- Language: English
- Genre: Thriller
- Publisher: Gollancz
- Publication date: 1965
- Publication place: United Kingdom
- Media type: Print

A Fragment of Fear is a 1965 thriller novel by the British writer John Bingham.

== Synopsis ==
James Compton, an English journalist and crime writer, is vacationing at a hotel in Italy, recovering from the after effects of a car accident. His fiancée Juliet, whom he is planning to marry in the very near future, is on a brief work trip to America.

Lucy Dawson, a fellow English guest with whom he is slightly acquainted, is found murdered in the ruins of Pompeii. The Italian police appear to be making little progress in their investigation. Compton is intrigued by the case and visits her grave in the protestant cemetery in Naples where he finds a single wreath from what appears to be a group or organisation with which Dawson was involved, calling itself the Stepping Stones. Planning to write an article about the case he enters Dawson’s hotel room and in a book about Pompeii finds a map indicating that Dawson had a prearranged meeting at the location where she was found murdered.

After a slightly jarring conversation with the hotel manager where he appears to be warned off further investigation, Compton returns to England and continues his enquiries. A number of unsettling incidents occur but he refuses to stop his investigations and quickly becomes embroiled in a world of blackmail and espionage leading him to doubt his own sanity.

== Adaptation ==
In 1970 it was turned into the film Fragment of Fear starring David Hemmings, Flora Robson and Arthur Lowe. The adaptation involved significant changes from the original story, but retains its overall plot.

== Bibliography ==
- Goble, Alan. The Complete Index to Literary Sources in Film. Walter de Gruyter, 1999.
