= Fifth Column (intelligence operation) =

WW2 MI5 counter-intelligence operation

Fifth Column was the name MI5, the British Security Service, gave to a World War II operation run from 1942 until at least 1947. Although initially intended to identify people who would be willing to assist Germany in the event of an invasion of the United Kingdom, it developed to divert its targets away from harmful activities. It ended up providing information on more than 500 suspects, but it was the source of conflict within MI5, and after the war ended it remained secret, with none of the targets ever aware that they had been its subject. It was revealed in a release of files to the National Archives in 2014.

== Personnel ==
The operation was run by the counter-sabotage section of MI5, designation B1c. The head of this small section was Victor Rothschild, who had joined MI5 in 1940 to do scientific liaison. He was assisted by Theresa Clay, an entomologist whom he'd recruited. The agent at the heart of the operation was Eric Roberts, a former bank clerk who had been working under cover for MI5 inside the British Union of Fascists since 1934.

== The operation ==
While looking for a spy ring at the British branch of the Siemens company in 1941, Roberts had come into contact with a British fascist, Marita Perigoe. While MI5 believed Perigoe to be of "mixed Swedish and German origin", she was actually the London-born daughter of Australian parents; her mother was a songwriter and composer, May Brahe. Perigoe was determined to help Germany win the war. At the start of 1942, Rothschild proposed that she should instead be put to work for MI5.

Roberts, working under the alias "Jack King", told Perigoe that he was the Gestapo's agent in London, with instructions to find people who would be willing to help Germany in the event of invasion. Perigoe agreed to help and began bringing in recruits including her friend Eileen Gleave and a former fascist acquaintance Hans Kohout. The intention was that this would be a passive operation, but the recruits wanted to be put to work, either as sabotage agents or spies. MI5 decided the safest thing to do would be to allow them to gather intelligence. Kohout in particular was a prolific gatherer of intelligence: he brought in the specifications of the new Mosquito bomber, clues to night-vision technology and details of "Window". Other recruits supplied information on fellow fascists and Nazi sympathizers.

The group met in a flat at 499 Park West, which had been bugged by MI5. By the end of the war, Roberts was estimated to be directly or indirectly in contact with 500 fascists.

The operation was opposed by some within MI5, who argued that Roberts was effectively an agent provocateur. But Guy Liddell, director of counter-espionage, defended it: "In a very mild sense it is, but in the absence of other methods, I do think it is desirable to ascertain something about evilly intentioned persons."

== Aftermath ==
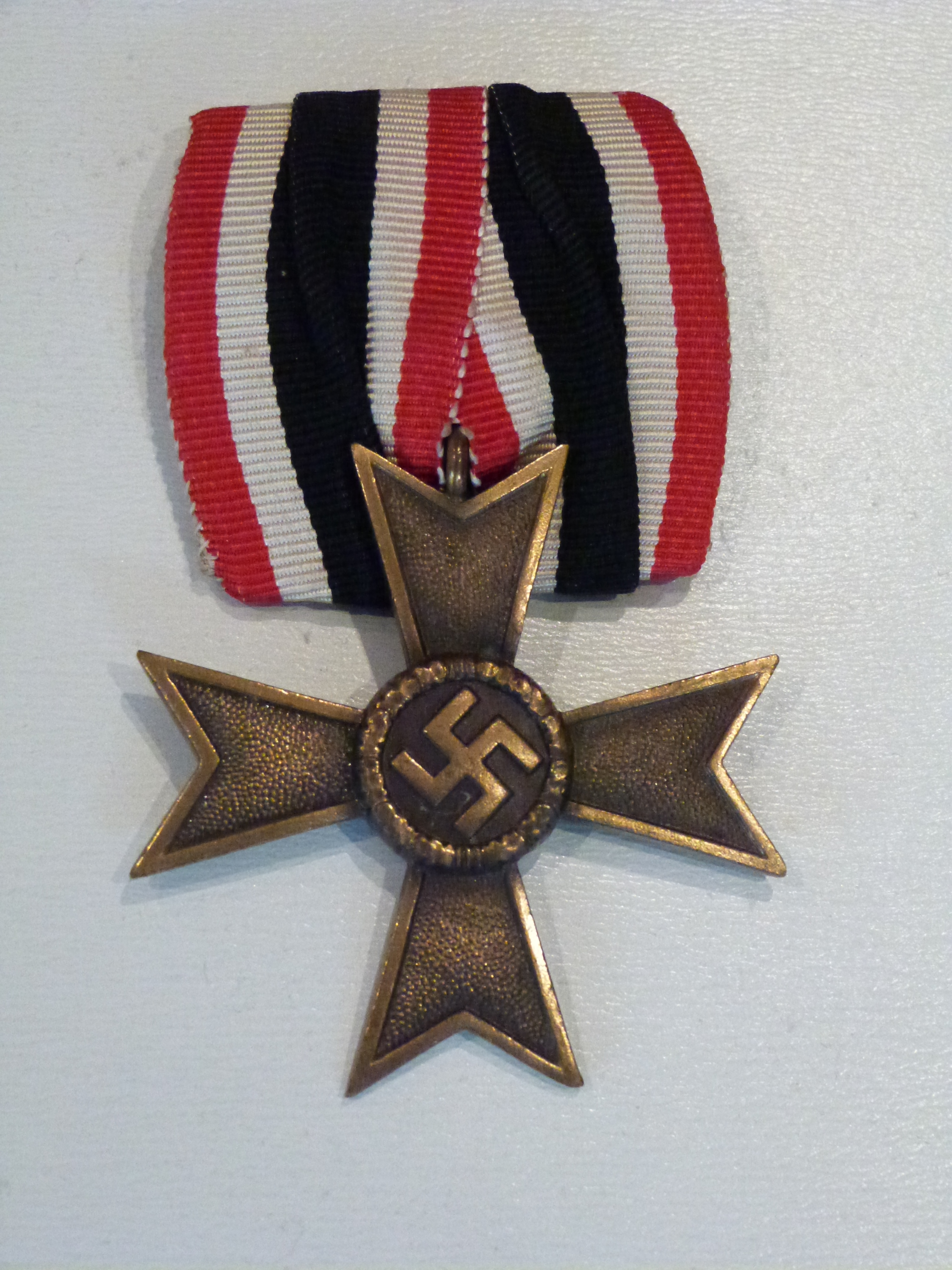
War Merit Cross 2nd Class, given to Hans Kohout in January 1946 by the MI5 officer Eric Roberts, and found by Kohout's son Ernest after his death

At the end of the war, MI5 considered prosecuting or unmasking the Fifth Column members, but opted instead to keep them running as informants. While they certainly intended to help Germany, in fact they never were in contact with any genuine German agent, and thus their acts might not have counted legally as espionage. At a ceremony in January 1946, Roberts presented Perigoe and Kohout with Nazi medals – the Kriegsverdienstkreuz 2. Klasse – and thanked them for their work. The files do not reveal when the operation was run down, but it seems to have tailed off by 1947. The members of the Fifth Column went to their deaths unaware of the truth of the operation. After Kohout died in 1979, his son Ernest found the medal among his things.

== Revealing of operation ==
The operation came to light in files released by MI5 to the National Archives in February 2014. At the time, although the agent "Jack King" was not identified, the Daily Telegraph newspaper named him as John Bingham. A subsequent set of files released by MI5 in October 2014 revealed that he was Eric Roberts, a previously unknown MI5 officer. The operation is the subject of the 2018 book Agent Jack by the journalist Robert Hutton.

== The operation in fiction ==
In 2018, two novels were published that cited Roberts and the Fifth Column operation as part of their inspiration: Kate Atkinson's Transcription, and Anthony Quinn's Our Friends in Berlin.

== See also ==
- Double-Cross System
