= Simon Bingham, 8th Baron Clanmorris =

Irish peer (1937–2026)

Simon John Ward Bingham, 8th Baron Clanmorris (25 October 1937 – 1 October 2026) was an Irish peer.

== Biography ==
Bingham was the son of John Bingham, 7th Baron Clanmorris, and his wife Madeleine (née Ebel). He was educated at Downside School near Bath, Somerset, before completing National Service as 2nd Lieutenant in 1957–1958. In 1961 he graduated from Queens' College, Cambridge, earning a Bachelor of Arts and later becoming a member of the Institute of Chartered Accountants.

In 1971, he married Gizella Maria Zverkó, daughter of Zandor Zverkó. The two had their only child, Lucy Katherine Gizella Bingham, in 1974.

Clanmorris died on 1 October 2026, at the age of 88.

Peerage of Ireland
Preceded by John Bingham	Baron Clanmorris; 1988–2026	Succeeded by Derek Bingham
