= I Love, I Kill =

1968 novel

- First edition (UK)
- Author: John Bingham
- Language: English
- Genre: Thriller
- Publisher: Gollancz (UK); Dodd, Mead (US)
- Publication date: 1968
- Publication place: United Kingdom
- Media type: Print

I Love, I Kill is a 1968 thriller novel by the British writer John Bingham. Dodd Mead released it in America with the alternative title Good Old Charlie.

== Bibliography ==
- Reilly, John M. Twentieth Century Crime & Mystery Writers. Springer, 2015.
- West, Nigel. The A to Z of British Intelligence. Scarecrow Press, 2009.
