= And I Love You So (Shirley Bassey album) =

Studio album by Shirley Bassey
- Released: October 1972
- Genre: MOR
- Label: United Artists
- Producers: Noel Rogers, Johnny Harris

Shirley Bassey chronology
I Capricorn (1972)	And I Love You So (1972)	Never Never Never (1973)

Professional ratings
Review scores
Source	Rating
AllMusic	3.5/5 stars

And I Love You So is a 1972 album by Shirley Bassey.

Released late in 1972 to positive reviews, this was Bassey's fourth album of the decade and was one of the albums which comprised her 'comeback' period of the 1970s. Unlike the earlier albums, it did not feature any hit singles and consequently didn't fare as well as the previous three. It made No. 24, and remained on the chart for 9 weeks, reaching its peak on Christmas week, resulting in higher than average sales. Singles released were "And I Love You So" (a cover of the Don McLean hit) and "The Ballad of the Sad Young Men", although the CD liner notes consider tracks "If We Only Have Love" and "The Way of Love" to be stronger single choices. The title track did however become a UK top three hit some months later for Perry Como.

The original release was in stereo on vinyl and cassette. This album was re-issued on CD in 2000 with two bonus tracks: "If I Should Love Again" (previously only released as a B-side to "The Ballad of the Sad Young Men") and "Let Me Be the One", which was unreleased until 1994. The album was re-released again in a double pack with previous album I Capricorn in November 2010.

== Track listing ==
=== Side One ===
1. "Someday" (John Bettis, Richard Carpenter) - 4.59
2. "Bless the Beasts and Children" (Perry Botkin, Jr., Barry De Vorzon) - 3.09
3. "Jezahel" (Brian Keith, Ivano Fossati, Oscar Prudente) - 2.50
4. "And I Love You So" (Don McLean) - 4.31
5. "The Way of Love" (Jacques Dieval, Al Stillman) - 2.38
6. "The First Time Ever I Saw Your Face" (Ewan MacColl) - 4.48

=== Side Two ===
1. "Day by Day" (Stephen Schwartz, John-Michael Tebelak) - 2.48
2. "Without You" (Tom Evans, Pete Ham) - 3.34
3. "The Ballad of the Sad Young Men" (Fran Landesman, Tommy Wolf) - 5.29
4. "I Don't Know How To Love Him" (Andrew Lloyd Webber, Tim Rice) - 4.22
5. "I'd Do It All Again" (Richard Ahlert, Leon Carr) - 3.35
6. "If We Only Have Love" (Eric Blau, Jacques Brel, Mort Shuman) - 3.53

CD re-issue bonus tracks:

1. "If I Should Love Again" (Adriano Della Guistina, Norman Newell)
2. "Let Me Be the One" (Roger Nichols, Paul Williams)

== Personnel ==
- Shirley Bassey – vocals
- Johnny Harris – arranger, conductor, producer on tracks 3, 4, 6, 7, 8, 10 and 12
- Arthur Greenslade – arranger and conductor on tracks 1, 2, 5, 9 and 11
- Noel Rogers – producer on tracks 1, 2, 5, 9 and 11, executive producer

== Public Enemy's sampling of "Jezahel" ==
The instrumental backing section of the track "Jezahel" was sampled to form the core of the backing track to rap band Public Enemy's single "Harder Than You Think". This was the first single from Public Enemy's 20th-anniversary album How You Sell Soul to a Soulless People Who Sold Their Soul? released in 2007. The Public Enemy track instrumental version has been widely used as a soundtrack on TV, most famously for on the Channel 4 coverage of the 2012 Summer Paralympics. After the games, the track continued to be used at the theme for The Last Leg. This created a renewed popularity in the Public Enemy single and it reached No.1 in the US R&B and UK Indie charts in 2012.

== Charts ==
Chart peaks for And I Love You So
Chart (1972)	Peak position
US Billboard Top LPs & Tape	171
UK Official Albums Chart	24
