= I Capricorn =

Studio album by Shirley Bassey
- Released: February 1972
- Studios: Advision Studios, London
- Genre: MOR
- Label: United Artists
- Producers: Noel Rogers, Johnny Harris

Shirley Bassey chronology
Something Else (1971)	I Capricorn (1972)	And I Love You So (1972)

I Capricorn is a 1972 album by Shirley Bassey.

Following on from the success of her previous two albums, I Capricorn saw Bassey still in the midst of her revival in the 1970s. Some months earlier she had released the single "For All We Know", which had become one of the biggest hits of her career, peaking at No.6 in the UK and remaining on the charts for half a year. This album was released just as the single was leaving the chart and just as her second James Bond theme, "Diamonds are Forever", was entering the chart. Surprisingly, the Bond theme song was not featured on this collection. The album itself, released in February 1972, made No.13 and remained on the UK album chart for 11 weeks. In the US, Bassey undertook a promotional tour during March which took in 12 cities. It reached No.94 on the Billboard 200 Track "I've Never Been a Woman Before" was subsequently released as a single, but failed to match the success of the first. The B-side, "The Greatest Performance of My Life" (also taken from this album) became a mainstay of her live concerts for the next few years.

The album also contained the popular songs "Losing My Mind", "The Look of Love" and John Lennon's "Love". The title track was appropriate in that Bassey was indeed a Capricorn (born January 8). Producer Johnny Harris along with his assistant John Bromley (who also played guitar on the album) penned one song, "The Way a Woman Loves". I Capricorn remains one of the most highly regarded albums by her fans.

Early issues of this album had a metallic gold finish and the artwork was pasted on. I Capricorn was re-issued on CD in 2000 by EMI with alternative artwork. It was later re-released in a double pack with the follow-up album And I Love You So in November 2010.

== Track listing ==
Side One

1. "I Capricorn" (Larry Grossman, Hal Hackady) 4.30
2. "The Look of Love" (Burt Bacharach, Hal David) 3.07
3. "The Way a Woman Loves" (Johnny Harris, John Bromley) 3.07
4. "Love" (John Lennon) 3.25
5. "Where am I Going?" (Cy Coleman, Dorothy Fields) 3.15
6. "I've Never Been a Woman Before" (Ron Miller, Tom Baird) 2.40

Side Two

1. "For All We Know" (Fred Karlin, Robb Wilson, Arthur James) 2.44
2. "The Greatest Performance of My Life" (Roberto Sanchez [Sandro], Oscar Anderle, Robert Allen) 3.29
3. "Where Is Love?" (Lionel Bart) 3.34
4. "Losing My Mind" (Stephen Sondheim) 2.48
5. "One Less Bell to Answer" (Burt Bacharach, Hal David) 2.29
6. "Lost and Lonely" (Adriano Della Guistina, Vittorino Pecchia, Jon Hendricks) 2.48

== Personnel ==
- Shirley Bassey – vocals
- Noel Rogers – executive producer
- Johnny Harris – producer, arranger and conductor
- John Bromley – assistant arranger and conductor, guitar
- Martin Rushent – engineer
- Norman Seeff – photography, sleeve design

== Charts ==
Chart peaks for I Capricorn
Chart (1972)	Peak position
US Billboard Top LPs & Tape	94
UK Official Albums Chart	13
