= The Double Agent =

1966 novel by John Bingham

- First edition
- Author: John Bingham
- Language: English
- Genre: Thriller
- Publisher: Gollancz
- Publication date: 1966
- Publication place: United Kingdom
- Media type: Print

The Double Agent is a 1966 spy thriller novel by the British writer John Bingham. It features the fictional head of British intelligence Ducane, who recurs in several of the author's novels. It was a runner-up for the Gold Dagger award.

== Bibliography ==
- Reilly, John M. Twentieth Century Crime & Mystery Writers. Springer, 2015.
- West, Nigel. The A to Z of British Intelligence. Scarecrow Press, 2009.
