= Fragment of Fear =

1970 British film by Richard C. Sarafian

- Theatrical release poster
- Directed by: Richard C. Sarafian
- Written by: Paul Dehn
- Based on: A Fragment of Fear by John Bingham
- Produced by: Paul Dehn; John R. Sloan
- Starring: David Hemmings; Gayle Hunnicutt; Flora Robson; Arthur Lowe
- Cinematography: Oswald Morris
- Edited by: Malcolm Cooke
- Music by: Johnny Harris
- Production company: Columbia Pictures
- Distributed by: Columbia Pictures
- Release date: 3 September 1970 (UK); September 1971 (US)
- Running time: 94 minutes
- Country: United Kingdom
- Language: English

Fragment of Fear is a 1970 British thriller film directed by Richard C. Sarafian and starring David Hemmings, Gayle Hunnicutt, Wilfrid Hyde-White, Roland Culver, Flora Robson and Arthur Lowe. It was written by Paul Dehn adapted from the 1965 novel A Fragment of Fear by John Bingham.

== Plot ==
Tim Brett is a former drug addict who has written a book about his experiences, which has been published. He has been clean for about a year, and visits his aunt, a wealthy philanthropist, in an Italian coastal hotel. She expresses interest in helping some of Brett's former acquaintances.

Soon after, on a tour of Pompeii, visitors discover the body of his aunt, who has been strangled. At the elaborate funeral Brett has a conversation with Signor Bardoni, the hotel owner, who organised the funeral. He says it is ironic that his aunt has been killed by a criminal when she had spent her life "helping criminals". A card on a wreath at the funeral says it is from "The Stepping Stones", which Signor Bardoni attempts to conceal.

Brett starts a relationship with Juliet, one of the women who found his aunt's body, and they are soon engaged. Six months after his aunt's murder and back in England, Brett is dissatisfied with the progress that the police are making in the case, and he begins to ask questions of some of his aunt's acquaintances. He then begins to receive warnings from unknown persons to stop his inquiries. On the train he meets an elderly woman. She hands him a note of supposed comfort, asking him to read it at home. The note proves to have been typed on his own typewriter, and warns him to leave matters to the police. He also finds an ominous laugh recorded on his own tape recorder, and a cigarette end in his toilet, indicating that someone has been in his flat.

Brett is visited by a police sergeant, Sgt. Matthews, who informs him that the woman on the train has lodged a complaint against Brett. Sgt. Matthews takes Brett's information and the note, but after the woman is found dead, Brett finds out that there is no sergeant by that name working at the police station.

He makes contact with a secret government agency which tells him that they are after the people who are threatening him. They explain that the Stepping Stones, which was originally set up by his aunt to help criminals to become good citizens, has become an organisation blackmailing those who become successful. Brett is later assaulted on the streets at night by two men who leave him lying on the ground with a hypodermic needle. He throws the needle away down a gutter. Later, he receives a phone call implying Juliet will be harmed at their wedding, and his mental state deteriorates seriously.

At their wedding, Brett becomes paranoid about the attendees and starts to hallucinate. He drags Juliet out of the church before they have been married and flees. He continues to hallucinate on the train. In the closing scene, Juliet pushes the unstable Brett in a wheelchair.

== Cast ==
- David Hemmings as Tim Brett
- Gayle Hunnicutt as Juliet Bristow
- Wilfrid Hyde-White as Mr. Copsey
- Flora Robson as Lucy Dawson
- Adolfo Celi as Signor Bardoni
- Roland Culver as Mr. Vellacot
- Daniel Massey as Major Ricketts
- Mona Washbourne as Mrs. Gray
- Arthur Lowe as Mr. Nugent
- Yootha Joyce as Miss Ward-Cadbury
- Derek Newark as Sergeant Matthews
- Patricia Hayes as Mrs. Baird
- Mary Wimbush as "Bunface"
- Glynn Edwards as CID Superintendent
- Philip Stone as CID Sergeant
- Bernard Archard as priest
- Kenneth Cranham as Joe
- Angelo Infanti as Bruno
- Massimo Sarchielli as Mario
- Michael Rothwell as Rocky
- Petra Markham as schoolgirl
- Georgina Moon as schoolgirl
- Lois Hyett as Schoolgirl
- John Rae as uncle Stanley
- Edward Kemp as Kenny
- Hilda Barry as Miss Daley
- Kurt Christian as Nino
- Jessica Dublin as American matron
- Louise Lambert as American matron
- Richard Kerr as pop singer
- a London pigeon as Columbus

== Production ==
The film was made at Shepperton Studios. Location shooting took place around London, Seaford in Sussex and around Pompeii and Sorrento in Italy. The film's sets were designed by the art director Ray Simm. Costumes were by Phyllis Dalton.

== Music ==
The jazz score composed by Johnny Harris was later used by Levi's to soundtrack their European Kung Fu TV advertising campaign in the late 1990s. The original soundtrack features Harold McNair on a solo flute.

== Critical reception ==
The Monthly Film Bulletin wrote: "For much of its length, Fragment of Fear works quite well as a standard whodunnit.... David Hemmings, though indecisively Methody, still gives one of his most detailed performances so far; and the mood is contrived and controlled well enough to keep one engrossed. ... And then the detective story becomes an espionage thriller, the temperature drops, interest dies, and just after an attempt to revive it with the extraordinary wedding sequence the film quite suddenly ends: a train goes into a tunnel and never comes out again ... when a final shot startles one into blank bewilderment, one's initial reaction is that one has been hoodwinked, that the whole film is a shameful cheat."
