= The Toxhards =

American band

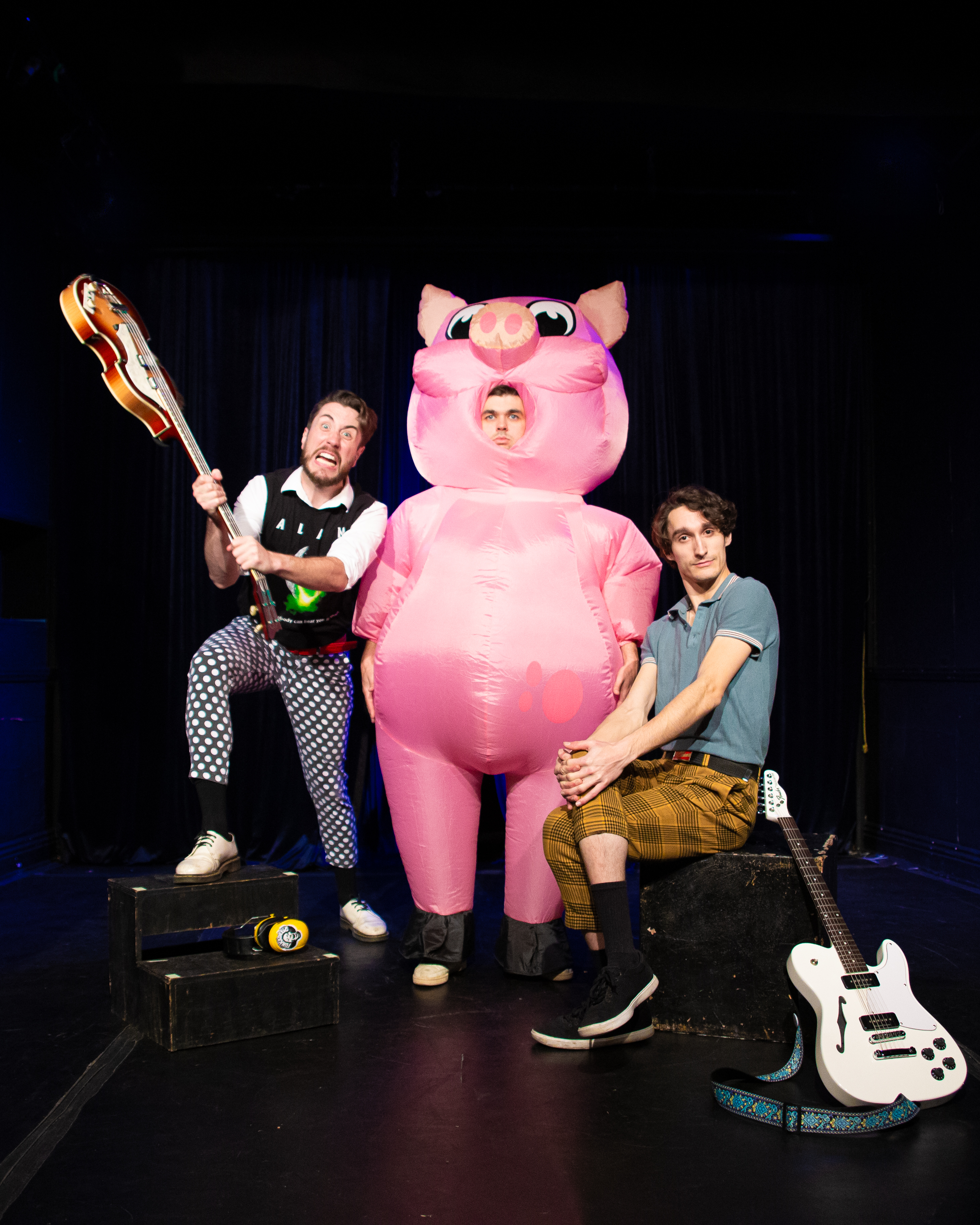
- The Toxhards in 2024.

Background information
- Origin: Los Angeles, California
- Genres: alternative rock; progressive rock; indie rock
- Years active: 2018–present
- Label: Hopeless Records
- Members: Casey Donovan; Emerson Harris; Alan Powers
- Past members: Matt Garcia
- Website: www.toxhards.com

The Toxhards are an alternative rock band based in Los Angeles, California. The band consists of lead vocalist and bassist Alan Powers, guitarist Emerson Harris, and drummer Casey Donovan. While Powers is denoted as the group's lead vocalist, both Donovan and Harris are featured vocalists throughout the band's discography. The band is known for their engaging and theatrical live performances and genre-bending tracks. The group signed with Hopeless Records in 2023.

== History ==
The group was formed after the members met via a theater club while attending college at Chapman University. Their unusual name comes from a typo of 'Richard Nixon', as they were a part of a musical produced at the university titled Richard Nixon's Big Adventure.

The band began releasing studio singles in 2021 with "How Lucky Am I?", which saw success on streaming platforms and local radio, notably Spotify. The following year, the band released "Ængus the Prize-Winning Hog", which went viral across social media and has since gathered over 7 million views. Following the traction of their previous single, the group released "Doombop!" in 2023. The track received praise from press within the alt rock community and saw similar success on streaming platforms.

The band announced the departure of member Matt Garcia via Instagram in July 2024.

The group opened for Here Come The Mummies during their fall tour in 2024.

The band released their first album, Your Neighborhood, in 2025. The album includes the previously released track, "Satan's Little Hell Song" and a brand new composition, "Cruel, All The Way Down", which garnered positive reviews in the community.

== Musical style and influences ==
The group has been described as being a mix of psychedelic rock, progressive rock, indie rock and theatrical rock. The band have credited musical influence from Rush, Talking Heads and Grateful Dead.

Harris is the son of musician and composer Johnny Harris, and has sourced his father as a great source of inspiration for his musical career. The band's songs "Sleep Talking" and "Johnny" were written as a result of Harris' passing in 2020.

== Band members ==
- Casey Donovan – drums, vocals, piano (2018–present)
- Matt Garcia – guitar, backing vocals (2019–2024)
- Emerson Harris – guitar, vocals, bass guitar (2018–present)
- Alan Powers – lead vocals, bass guitar, guitar, drums (2018–present)
- Alex "Mayhem" Mahan – guitar, banjo (2024–present; touring)

== Discography ==
=== Studio albums ===
- Your Neighborhood (2025)

=== Extended plays ===
- Live! At The ToxHarvest (2020)
- No One Cares? (2021)
- The Toxhards by The Toxhards (2024)
- Casey Michael Donovan Presents… The 102.3 WKCD Promotional Sampler! (Music From And Inspired By The Toxhards’ Album “Your Neighborhood”… and more!) (2025)

=== Singles ===
- "Chompy Versions" (2020)
- "How Lucky Am I?" (2021)
- "OxyContin" (2022)
- "Out of the City" / "Bye Bye Baby" (2022)
- "Ængus the Prize-Winning Hog" (2022)
- "Doombop!" (2023)
- "(The) Coffee Song" / "October" (2023)
- "Should We Get A Dog?" (2024)
- "The Butcherman's Lament" (2024)
- "Satan's Little Hell Song" (2024)
- "Beatrice" (2025)
- “Get Creative! Or Get Radicalized!” (2025)
- “Alligator Crocodile” (2026)
- "Mr. Clifford" (2026)
- "Paint It, Baby Blue" (2026)
