= The Third Skin =

1954 novel

- First US edition
- Author: John Bingham
- Language: English
- Genre: Thriller
- Publisher: Gollancz (US); Dodd, Mead (US)
- Publication date: 1954
- Publication place: United Kingdom
- Media type: Print

The Third Skin is a 1954 thriller novel by the British writer John Bingham. It was released in the United States three years later in 1957, published by Dodd Mead with an alternative title Murder Is a Witch.

== Bibliography ==
- Reilly, John M. Twentieth Century Crime & Mystery Writers. Springer, 2015.
