= A Case of Libel =

1963 novel

- First edition
- Author: John Bingham
- Language: English
- Genre: Drama
- Publisher: Gollancz
- Publication date: 1963
- Publication place: United Kingdom
- Media type: Print

A Case of Libel is a 1963 novel by the British writer John Bingham. Unlike his usual crime-thrillers, it is a drama about a libel case brought by a woman against a national newspaper headed by a ruthless new editor.

== Bibliography ==
- Reilly, John M. Twentieth Century Crime & Mystery Writers. Springer, 2015.
