= Married Life (2007 film) =

- Original theatrical poster
- Directed by: Ira Sachs
- Written by: Ira Sachs; Oren Moverman
- Based on: Five Roundabouts to Heaven by John Bingham
- Produced by: Ira Sachs; Steve Golin; Sidney Kimmel; Jawal Nga
- Starring: Chris Cooper; Patricia Clarkson; Pierce Brosnan; Rachel McAdams
- Cinematography: Peter Deming
- Edited by: Affonso Gonçalves
- Music by: Dickon Hinchliffe
- Distributed by: Sony Pictures Classics
- Release dates: September 12, 2007 (TIFF); March 7, 2008 (United States)
- Running time: 90 minutes
- Country: United States
- Language: English
- Budget: $12 million
- Box office: $2.8 million

Married Life is a 2007 American period drama film directed by Ira Sachs. The screenplay by Sachs and Oren Moverman is based on the 1953 novel Five Roundabouts to Heaven by John Bingham. Cast members include Patricia Clarkson, Chris Cooper, Rachel McAdams and Pierce Brosnan. The novel was also the basis for the December 20, 1962 episode of The Alfred Hitchcock Hour entitled "The Tender Poisoner".

== Plot ==
In 1949, successful middle-aged businessman Harry Allen (Chris Cooper) is having an affair with considerably younger war widow Kay Nesbitt (Rachel McAdams). Feeling rejuvenated by his emotional reawakening, he confides in his best friend Richard Langley (Pierce Brosnan) and encourages him to visit his mistress to alleviate her loneliness. Richard complies and immediately finds himself attracted to the young woman.

Richard discovers Harry's wife Pat (Patricia Clarkson), oblivious to her husband's ongoing tryst, is engaged in an affair of her own with John O'Brien (David Wenham). Anxious to cement his blossoming relationship with Kay, Richard separately urges Harry and Pat to remain with each other.

Harry, however, is determined to marry Kay. Certain that divorce would hurt and humiliate Pat too much, Harry decides to kill her by lacing her daily digestive aid with poison. He visits Kay, who unexpectedly ends their relationship. Harry departs, then returns to ask for all the correspondence he has sent her, only to discover Kay in the arms of Richard, who had secreted himself upstairs. Realization sets in, and Harry races home to stop his wife from taking her nightly dose of medication. When Harry returns home he finds his wife sleeping. Thinking she consumed the poison, Harry walks towards the bedroom window and opens it. He is startled by Pat waking up and saying, "You're home early, is everything all right honey." Harry looks out the window in his backyard and sees John O'Brien running away from the house while getting dressed, implying that at this moment Harry realizes Pat's infidelity. Harry never confronts her, maybe consumed by his own guilt.

Richard and Kay eventually wed and become part of the Allens’ social circle, which includes John O'Brien and his wife. Harry and Pat continue to be on the periphery of their healing marriage.

== Cast ==
- Pierce Brosnan as Richard Langley
- Chris Cooper as Harry Allen
- Patricia Clarkson as Pat Allen
- Rachel McAdams as Kay Nesbitt
- David Wenham as John O'Brien

== Production ==
Exterior scenes were shot in and around Vancouver, British Columbia. Interiors were filmed at the First Avenue Studio in Burnaby. Principal photography took place from July 21 to October 27, 2006.

The film premiered at the 2007 Toronto International Film Festival. That same year it was shown at the Festival do Rio in Brazil, the New York Film Festival, the Woodstock Film Festival, the American Film Market, and the Dubai International Film Festival, and it was shown at the 2008 Miami International Film Festival before finally going into limited release in the US on March 7, 2008. The film opened on nine screens and grossed $55,851 on its opening weekend. It eventually earned $1,507,990 in the US and $1,336,007 in foreign markets for a worldwide box office total of $2,843,997.

== Critical reception ==
The film received mixed to positive reviews. On review aggregator website Rotten Tomatoes, the film holds an approval rating of 55% based on 116 reviews, and an average rating of 5.88/10. The website's critical consensus reads, "Married Life has excellent performances and flashes of dark wit, but it suffers from tonal shifts and uneven pacing." On Metacritic, the film has a weighted average score of 65 out of 100, based on 29 critics, indicating "generally positive reviews".

Stephen Holden of The New York Times called the film "a period comedy of manners merged with a suspenseful psychological thriller [that] aspires to be a hybrid of the sort that Alfred Hitchcock polished to perfection in the age of sexual subtext and subterfuge" but added it "does not provide the shivery security of being manipulated by Hitchcock, a master trickster who calculated his every move. The sense of being guided through a story by a sure-handed Hollywood magician toward a delightful trick ending is missing."

Roger Ebert of the Chicago Sun-Times rated it three out of four stars and said it "crosses film noir with the look and feel of a Douglas Sirk film."

Mick LaSalle of the San Francisco Chronicle observed the film "has the virtues of suspense, good performances and well-written scenes that are given time to breathe. That's what's entertaining about it. What's most interesting about it - its overall feeling - is harder to describe. Partly as a result of the period setting but mainly because of the movie's entire atmosphere... there's a quality of distance to the picture, as though we're seeing a case study. Or watching ourselves watch the movie. It's strange. It's different. It's arresting, and it's definitely intentional. Ira Sachs knew what he wanted to do, and he's a talent worth watching."

Todd McCarthy of Variety commented, "The tone, casting, and material form a less-than-perfect match in Married Life, a period domestic drama that never quite decides if it wants to be a credible marital study, a noirish meller or a sly comedy. The talented quartet of lead players feels oddly paired in this curious tale of jealousy, betrayal, and murderous intent. Helmer Ira Sachs... appears to be working a bit out of his zone here... [The film] is dramatic but lacks a dynamic; one can sense the director's intent and affection for the form, but also see that working in this stylized vein does not necessarily come easily for a filmmaker of his hitherto more naturalistic tendencies."

== DVD release ==
The DVD release of the film includes three alternative endings, all of which advance the action to late 1966. Harry and Pat are returning home from their grandson's wedding when he is distracted by a billboard advertising the digestive aid he had laced with poison to murder his wife. In the first and longest of the three, he crashes the car and Pat is killed. Richard visits Harry in the hospital, and Harry asks him to bring him the same poison so he can kill himself. Richard complies, then is arrested and tried for Harry's murder. The audience is left not knowing the outcome. The second alternate ending matches the first up to the point of Harry consuming the poison, then fades to black. In the third, Harry pointedly sees the billboard, smiles wryly, and continues without crashing.
