= Something (Shirley Bassey album) =

Studio album by Shirley Bassey
- Released: August 1970
- Genre: MOR
- Length: 40:35
- Label: United Artists
- Producer: Noel Rogers, Johnny Harris, Tony Colton

Shirley Bassey chronology
Live at the Talk of the Town (1970)	Something (1970)	Something Else (1971)

Alternative cover
- US version

Professional ratings
Review scores
Source	Rating
AllMusic	4/5 stars

Something is a 1970 album by Shirley Bassey. With her career having been in decline since the latter part of the mid 1960s, Something proved to be Shirley Bassey's comeback when it was released in August 1970. The title track single became her biggest UK hit for many years, reaching No.4 and spending 22 weeks on the chart. This was actually the second single featured on the album, "The Sea and Sand" having already been released earlier. The album was similarly her biggest hit for many years in the album charts, reaching No.5 and spending 28 weeks in the top 50.

This album led to a major revival in Bassey's career, and it would see Bassey transform into mainly an album artist, recording fifteen albums in the 1970s (four of those live recordings). Of those three would be top ten albums, three others in the top fifteen, and a further four in the top 40. She would also reach the top three twice, with a pair of compilations. This was also her first work with record producer Noel Rogers and producer/arranger Johnny Harris, who built on Bassey's traditional pop roots to include contemporary songs and arrangements.

The album's original release was in stereo on vinyl and cassette. This was the first Shirley Bassey studio album not to be issued in mono. The album was released in the US as Shirley Bassey is Really "Something" and featured different artwork and cover photograph. EMI re-issued the album on CD in 2002 with a bonus track, "Fool on the Hill," which was a single release from 1971.

== Track listing ==
Side One.

1. "Something" (George Harrison)
2. "Spinning Wheel" (David Clayton-Thomas)
3. "Yesterday I Heard the Rain" (Armando Manzanero, Gene Lees)
4. "The Sea and Sand" (Johnny Harris, Tony Colton, Raymond Smith)
5. "My Way (Comme d'habitude)" (Jacques Revaux, Claude François, Gilles Thibaut, Paul Anka)
6. "What About Today?" (David Shire, Richard Maltby, Jr.)

Side Two.

1. "You and I" (Leslie Bricusse)
2. "Light My Fire" (Jim Morrison, Robby Krieger, Ray Manzarek, John Densmore)
3. "Easy to Be Hard" (Galt MacDermot, Gerome Ragni, James Rado)
4. "Life Goes On" (Mikis Theodorakis, Barbara Martin)
5. "What Are You Doing the Rest of Your Life?" (Michel Legrand, Alan Bergman, Marilyn Bergman)
6. "Yesterday, When I Was Young" (Charles Aznavour, Herbert Kretzmer)

CD bonus track

1. "Fool on the Hill" (John Lennon, Paul McCartney)

== Personnel ==
- Bill Parkinson - guitar (uncredited)
- Tony Campo - bass (uncredited)
- Harold Fisher - drums (uncredited)
- Johnny Harris - arranger, conductor
- Silvio Nobili - photography

== Charts ==
Chart (1970)	Peak position
Australian Albums (Kent Music Report)	17
Norwegian Albums (VG lista)	20
UK Albums Chart (OCC)	5
US Billboard Top LPs	105
US Best Selling Soul LPs (Billboard)	29
