= Murder Plan Six =

1958 novel

- First edition
- Author: John Bingham
- Language: English
- Genre: Thriller
- Publisher: Gollancz
- Publication date: 1958
- Publication place: United Kingdom
- Media type: Print

Murder Plan Six is a 1958 thriller novel by the British writer John Bingham. It was released in the United States by Dodd Mead the following year.

== Synopsis ==
A thriller writer reveals the plot of his latest novel to his publisher, who becomes concerned that it may be based on a real crime.

== Bibliography ==
- Reilly, John M. Twentieth Century Crime & Mystery Writers. Springer, 2015.
