= Johnny Harris (musician) =

Scottish film score composer (1932–2020)

- Born: John Stanley Livingstone Harris; 9 November 1932; Edinburgh, Scotland
- Died: 20 March 2020 (aged 87) Palm Springs, California, U.S.
- Genres: Pop; rock; jazz; film music
- Occupations: Musician; composer; record producer; conductor; arranger; band leader; musical director
- Instruments: Trumpet; piano; synthesizer
- Years active: 1964–2020
- Labels: Pye; Decca; United Artists; Warner Bros.
- Website: johnnyharrismusic.com

John Stanley Livingstone Harris (9 November 1932 – 20 March 2020) was a Scottish composer, record producer, arranger, conductor, and musical director. He lived in the United States from 1972 until his death.

== Early life ==
Johnny Harris was born in Edinburgh, Scotland to Welsh parents Jack (a fellow musician) and Grace Harris. A year after his birth he developed polio, leaving him with a life-long limp. He would later go on to graduate from the Guildhall School of Music in London.

== Career ==
=== Britain ===
Harris was originally a trumpet player with the Norman Burns band and big bands led by Vic Lewis, Ken Mackintosh, Cyril Stapleton and then a member of the short-lived beat group The Shubdubs with drummer Jimmie Nicol and organist Roger Coulam. In 1964, he recorded a Beatles cover version album and EP called Beatlemania with Jimmie Nicol which resulted in Nicol's replacing the ill Ringo Starr on a worldwide Beatles tour.

He joined Pye Records in 1965 as an arranger and conductor for producer Tony Hatch and his then-wife Jackie Trent. Johnny had an un-credited role as conductor on the Nancy In London album and worked with many other artists in the sixties as a staff member at Pye. He worked freelance for many other record labels in Great Britain and Europe and was a regular arranger, conductor and producer for Petula Clark until she left Pye in 1971.

The first official colour programme on BBC 1 was a concert by Petula Clark with the Johnny Harris Orchestra from the Royal Albert Hall, London, broadcast at midnight on 14/15 November 1969. He arranged, conducted and produced the majority of tracks on the Shirley Bassey albums Something, Something Else, I Capricorn, And I Love You So, Never Never Never and All by Myself and many tracks on sixties Decca Records Tom Jones and Engelbert Humperdinck albums. Johnny was the musical director for the BBC light entertainment show Happening For Lulu in 1968–69 with the Scottish singer Lulu and conducted her Eurovision Song Contest joint-winner Boom Bang-A-Bang in Madrid, 1969 which led to him gaining a solo record deal with Warner Bros. UK. He was the musical director for the BBC/ZDF co-production Pop Go The Sixties broadcast on BBC 1 on 31 December 1969 and had his own 1969 BBC Show of the Week called Up Tight featuring Georgie Fame and Lulu.

His album Movements was recorded with the best London session musicians in the spring of 1970, was performed live at the Royal Albert Hall and was pressed by Warner's three times in the UK (on orange, green and Burbank labels) and reissued on CD by Warner Bros. UK in 2002 with remastered sound, bonus tracks and an interview with Harris talking about the album and his career. Movements and All To Bring You Morning were again released in 2015 as limited edition SHMCD's by Warner Bros. Japan for the Japanese only market (this is the first time both Movements and All To Bring You Morning have been issued in Japan). Movements was again out-of-print worldwide until a vinyl only Australian release came out in November 2017.

Singles released from the Movements album were the space age classic Footprints on the Moon (1969) and the moody suspense theme Fragment of Fear (1970) from the film of the same name starring David Hemmings. Shirley Bassey recorded a vocal version of his arrangement of The Doors Light My Fire from Movements on her 1970 Something album (issued in the US as the Shirley Bassey Is Really "Something" album) which she still performs today.

Warner Bros. UK also released his Man in the Wilderness film soundtrack (1971) and the sequel to Movements, All To Bring You Morning (1973) before he left for the US to work with Paul Anka.

He composed the scores for several cult British films including Fragment of Fear (1970), Bloomfield (1971, his score was recorded in 1969 featuring Maurice Gibb of The Bee Gees), Man in the Wilderness (1971) and I Want What I Want (1972).

=== United States ===
Harris moved to the United States to record and conduct his orchestra in Las Vegas with Paul Anka where Elvis Presley asked him to lead his Vegas band. In 1973, while back in the UK at Advision Studios, he recorded the album All To Bring You Morning, with progressive rock musicians from the group Yes, Jon Anderson on vocals, Steve Howe on guitars and Alan White on drums who happened to be working in the next studio at Advision and asked to be involved in his follow-up album to Movements.

He recorded a string of hit singles with Paul Anka and Odia Coates and continued to work with Anka until 1977 and after that, he wanted to concentrate on scoring for film and television which led to a long-time gig as the musical director for Lynda Carter after he scored the third season of her television series Wonder Woman in 1979. Harris was Music Director for all 5 of Lynda Carter's Television Variety Specials and toured the world with her for over a decade appearing at the London Palladium, UK on 4 October 1980 to support her debut single for Motown Records The Last Song.

Harris' 1980 Miami disco song "Odyssey" (TK Records) was featured in the first series of Buck Rogers in the 25th Century episode "Space Rockers"; the song, which was originally composed for that episode became a hit song. Harris also arranged the opening Buck Rogers in the 25th Century theme music composed by Stu Phillips. The first 40 seconds of the Buck Rogers main-title theme is an original Harris composition before Stu's theme starts. "Odyssey" became popular again when it featured in the action-adventure game Grand Theft Auto: San Andreas (2004) playing on Bounce FM funk radio and in a few missions.

From 1990 to its close, Harris was the arranger and conductor for The Fabulous Palm Springs Follies at the historic Plaza Theatre in Palm Springs, California.

Johnny Harris - The Man Who Turned Down Elvis Twice is a biography written by his daughter Julie Pearce-Martin published to celebrate his 80th birthday in November 2012.

On 21 and 28 September 2013, Radio Six International broadcast two-hour-long shows titled 'The Johnny Harris Story' written, produced and presented by Darren Stuart.

Harris continued to work closely with Engelbert Humperdinck. Several of the biggest moments in Engelbert's current show are Harris' arrangements, Including "Crazy" and "On Broadway". In 2017 arranged 6 of the songs on Engelbert Humperdinck's recently released album, including the title song: "The Man I Want To Be". This album has been nominated for 4 Grammy Awards.

Harris also continued to score independent feature and short films, and web series. He was working on an original album, in collaboration with Robby Krieger in Krieger's own studio, proceeds would be donated to the St. Jude Children's Research Hospital.

== Death and legacy ==
Harris had been fighting lung cancer for two years when he died in March 2020 at the age of 87. Several of his children are musicians as well, such as Emerson Harris, who co-founded the alternative rockband The Toxhards in 2018. Emerson cites his father as a major influence, and the band's songs "Sleep Talking" and "Johnny" were written as a result of his passing.

== Selected discography ==
Albums

- 1964 : Beatlemania, the Beatles, Top Six Records TSL 1 (No reissue)
- 1966 : The Heart of Bart, Lionel Bart, United Artists Records SULP 1152 (No reissue)
- 1966 : A Handful of Songs, United Artists Records UAS 6607 (No reissue)
- 1966 : The Guitar Workshop - Pop Go The Classics, Pye Records NSPL 18165 (No reissue)
- 1970 : Movements, Warner Bros Records WS 3002 (reissued on CD and 2LP UK 2001)
- 1972 : Man in the Wilderness, film score, Warner Bros Records K 46126 (reissued on CD US 2010)
- 1973 : Bloomfield, film score, Pye Records NSPL 18376 (reissued on CD UK 2000)
- 1973 : All To Bring You Morning, Warner Bros Records K 46187 (reissued on CD UK 2008)
- 2013 : Buck Rogers in the 25th Century - Season One, television score, Intrada Records 255
- 2017 : Wonder Woman - Season Three, television score, La-La Land Records

Singles

- 1965 : "Mynahg Hop" / "Here Comes the Boot", Mercury Records MF 949
- 1969 : "Footprints on the Moon" / "Lulu's Theme", Warner Bros Records WB 8000
- 1970 : "Fragment of Fear" / "Stepping Stones", Warner Bros Records WB 8016
- 1971 : "Footprints on the Moon" / "Sacha's song" [Sacha Distel], Lyons Ready Brek Free Record SFI 83
- 1972 : "Ballad to an Unborn Child" / "Captain Henry's Theme", Warner Bros Records 7541
- 1976 : "Jubilation" [Harris/Anka] / "Tip Top Theme" [Martelli] arranged and produced by Johnny Harris, w/Bob Skaff, in assoc w/ Paul Anka Prod., United Artists Records UAXW 767Y
- 1980 : "Odyssey" (Pt 1) / "Odyssey" (Pt 2), Sunshine Sound Records SSD 4216
- 1997 : "Stepping Stones Edit" / "Full Circle Mix" / "Try & Touch Mix", EMI Records CDLIC 108
- 2016 : "Wonder Woman Main Title Season One" [Charles Fox & Norman Gimbel] / "Wonder Woman Main Title Season Three", La-La Land Records LLLLP 2002

Celebrity recordings of Harris songs

- 1968 : "Why Can'I Cry" [Harris/Clarke] / Recorded by Tom Jones, Petula Clark, Ginette Reno, Flora Purim and more.
- 1973 : "Jubilation" [Harris/Anka] / Recorded by Barbra Streisand, The "Butterfly" Album, 1 October 1974, Columbia Records, The Edwin Hawkins Singers, James Last, B.J. Arnau, Maxine Weldon, Sylvie Vartan, Katja Ebstein, Paul Anka.
- 1973 : "I'm Not Anyone" [Harris/Anka] / Recorded by Sammy Davis Jr., MGM Records 1973, & The Millennium Collection, The Best of Sammy Davis Jr., 20th Century Masters, Vic Franklyn, Shirley Bassey, Paul Anka.

Albums (arranger/producer/musical director)

- 1966 : Jackie Trent - The Magic of Jackie Trent, Pye Records NPL 18125
- 1966 : Petula Clark - My Love, Pye Records NPL 18141
- 1966 : Petula Clark - I Couldn't Live Without Your Love, Pye Records NPL 18148
- 1967 : Roy Budd - …is The Sound of Music, Pye Records NPL 18195
- 1967 : Paul and Barry Ryan - Two of a Kind, Decca Records LK 4878
- 1967 : Tom Jones - Live at The Talk of the Town, Decca Records SKL 4874
- 1967 : Engelbert Humperdinck - Twelve Great Songs Plus "Release Me", Decca Records SKL 4868
- 1968 : Engelbert Humperdinck - A Man Without Love, Decca Records SKL 4939
- 1968 : Tom Jones - Help Yourself, Decca Records SKL 4982
- 1968 : Tom Jones - Delilah, Decca Records SKL 4946
- 1969 : Lulu - Lulu's Album, EMI Columbia Records SCX 6365
- 1969 : The Flirtations - Sounds Like The Flirtations, Deram Records SML 1046
- 1969 : Ginette Reno - Everything That I Am, Decca Records SKL-R 5027
- 1970 : Shirley Bassey - Something, United Artists Records UAS 29100
- 1971 : Paul Anka - Jubilation, Buddah Records BDS 5114
- 1971 : Michael Allen - For The Love of Mike, Decca Records PS 564
- 1971 : Shirley Bassey - Something Else, United Artists Records UAS 29149
- 1971 : Michael Allen - Something Special, MGM Records SE 4762
- 1971 : Richard Harris - My Boy, Probe Records SPBA 6263
- 1971 : Sacha Distel - More And More, Warner Bros Records K 46117
- 1971 : Petula Clark - Petula '71, Pye Records NSPL 18370
- 1971 : Udo Jurgens - Udo '71, Ariola Records 80 888 1U
- 1972 : Richard Harris - Slides, Probe Records SPBA 6269
- 1972 : Shirley Bassey - I Capricorn, United Artists Records UAS 29246
- 1972 : Shirley Bassey - And I Love You So, United Artists Records UAS 29385
- 1972 : Petula Clark - Live at the Royal Albert Hall, Pye Records NSPL 18391
- 1973 : Shirley Bassey - Never Never Never, United Artists Records UAS 29471
- 1973 : The Edwin Hawkins Singers - New World, Buddah Records BDS 5131
- 1974 : Paul Anka - Anka, United Artists Records UA-LA314
- 1975 : Odia Coates - Odia Coates, United Artists Records UA-LA228-G
- 1977 : Tom Jones - What A Night, EMI Records EMC 3221
- 1982 : Shirley Bassey - All by Myself, Applause Records APP 1005
- 2000 : Shirley Bassey - The Remix Album...Diamonds Are Forever, EMI Records
- 2000 : Shirley Bassey - Greatest Hits Capital Records, EMI Records
- 2009 : Lynda Carter - At Last, Potomac Records 4001
- 2009 : Engelbert Humperdinck - Legacy of Love, EH Productions
- 2017 : Engelbert Humperdinck - The Man I Want To Be, OK! Good Records OK 90154-2

== Film/television ==
- 2019 Lemonade: Winning (TV series)
- 2016 Exiled Out East (TV series)
- 2015 Play Date (Short film)
- 2015 S&M Sally
- 2015 Come Simi
- 2005 The Entertainer (TV series)
- 2004 Star Search (TV series)
- 2003 Miss America Pageant (TV Special)
- 2003 Dance Fever (TV series)
- 2001/2002 Next Big Star (TV series)
- 1997 Still Kicking: The Fabulous Palm Springs Follies (Short film)
- 1996 Raven Hawk (TV movie)
- 1996 Frequent Flyer (TV movie)
- 1994 Guinevere (TV movie)
- 1994 Thicker Than Blood: The Larry McLinden Story (TV movie)
- 1994 I Spy Returns (TV movie)
- 1993 Family Pictures (TV movie)
- 1993 Lies and Lullabies (TV movie)
- 1992 Maid for Each Other (TV movie)
- 1991 Not of This World (TV movie)
- 1989 Exploring Psychic Powers... Live (TV Special)
- 1989 Women of the 21st Century (TV Special)
- 1988 Necessity (TV movie)
- 1986/1987 Downtown (TV series)
- 1987 A Different Affair (TV movie)
- 1986 Funny (TV Special)
- 1986 Can You Feel Me Dancing? (TV movie)
- 1984 Partners in Crime (TV series)
- 1984 Salute to Lady Liberty (TV Special)
- 1984 Courage
- 1984 Lynda Carter – Body And Soul (TV Special)
- 1982/1983 The Powers of Matthew Star (TV series)
- 1982 Lynda Carter – Street Life (TV Special)
- 1982 Hotline (TV movie)
- 1981 Born to Be Sold (TV movie)
- 1981 Diana Ross – Diana (TV Special)
- 1981 Lynda Carter – Celebration (TV Special)
- 1980 The Last Song (TV movie)
- 1980 Lynda Carter – Encore! (TV Special)
- 1979/1980 Buck Rogers in the 25th Century (TV series)
- 1979 Hello Berlin (TV Special with Liza Minnelli)
- 1980 Lynda Carter – Lynda Carter Special (TV Special)
- 1980 Goldie and Liza Together (TV Special)
- 1979 The Lisa Hartman Show (TV Special)
- 1978/1979 Wonder Woman (TV series)
- 1978 The Evil
- 1978 The Initiation of Sarah (TV movie)
- 1977 Shirley MacLaine - Royal Gala Performance, Her Majesty the Queen Silver Jubilee at the London Palladium (TV Special)
- 1977 Paul Anka...Music My Way (TV Special)
- 1972 Jack Jones...The Talk Of The Town (BBC TV Special)
- 1972 Georgia Brown...In Concert (BBC TV Special)
- 1972 I Want What I Want
- 1971 Petula...and Friends (BBC TV Special)
- 1971 Man in the Wilderness
- 1971 Bloomfield
- 1970 Fragment of Fear
- 1970 An Evening with Petula – Petula Clark in concert from the Royal Albert Hall Part 2 (BBC TV Special)
- 1969 Pop Go the Sixties! (BBC TV Special)
- 1969 An Evening with Petula – Petula Clark in concert from the Royal Albert Hall (BBC TV Special)
- 1969 The Eurovision Song Contest (TV special)
- 1969 That Guy Loves Me, Am I Supposed to Believe That?
- 1968/1969 Happening for Lulu (BBC TV series)
- 1968 Lulu's Back in Town (BBC TV series)
- 1968 BBC Show of the Week – Up Tight! Johnny Harris (BBC TV Special)
- 1964 The System

== Advertising ==
- Levi's (1997/2000)
- Michelob (1985)
- Maybelline (1980)
- Kodak (1976)
- Texaco (1970)
- Coca-Cola (1965)

== See also ==
- List of music arrangers
- Composers
- Shiloh Godson

== Citations ==
Bibliography

- Stuart, Darren (2002). Johnny Harris - Movements CD & 2LP. London: Warner Bros. Records.
- Pearce-Martin, Julie (2012). Johnny Harris - The Man Who Turned Down Elvis Twice. Fastprint Publishing.
