= Boston University Libraries =

The Boston University Libraries at Boston University include the Mugar Memorial Library, the main library on the Charles River campus, and several specialized libraries. These specialized libraries have targeted collections and services for area-specific research

The Law, Theology, and Medical Libraries, and the Howard Gotlieb Archival Research Center are separate units at BU.

The BU libraries house more than 2.4 million physical volumes, over 45,000 current unique serials, and 77,000 media titles. Students also have access to more than 35 million items due to the increased networked services through the Boston Library Consortium, the Boston Theological Institute and the New England Law Library Consortium.

The librarians provide library tutorials, library instruction from research basics to graduate-level classes, reference services, access to digital resources, specialist consultations, and librarian-created guides with curated resources.
