= May Brahe =

Australian composer

Mary Hannah (May) Brahe (née Dickson) (6 November 1884 – 14 August 1956) was an Australian composer, best known for her songs and ballads. Her most famous song by far is "Bless This House", recorded by John McCormack, Beniamino Gigli, Lesley Garrett and Bryn Terfel. According to Move.com.au: "She was the only Australian woman composer to win local an international recognition before World War II," having "290 of her 500 songs published. Of these, 248 were written under her own name, the remainder under aliases.

== Biography ==
Mary Hannah Dickson was born in East Melbourne in 1884. She was known as May from an early age. Her father was native born and her mother Scottish. She studied piano with her mother, then at Stratherne Girls' School, Hawthorn, and later with Mona McBurney and the singer Alice Rebotarro.

In 1903 she married Frederick Brahe, the couple had two sons and a daughter. By 1910 she was playing in a trio with George W. L. Marshall-Hall, and accompanying singers. In 1912 she left for London to establish herself as a composer, leaving her children behind in the care of family. Her first success was the 1915 song "Down Here," beginning "It's Quiet Down Here" with lyrics by P.J. O'Reilly. In 1914 she returned to Australia, but only for long enough to bring her family back to England.

Brahe published under her married name and nine pseudonyms. This allowed more frequent publication, as publishers were reluctant to publish more than four of her songs in a year. The names she composed under included: Mervyn Banks, Mary Hannah Brahe, Donald Crichton, Stanley Dickson, Alison Dodd, Stanton Douglas, Eric Faulkner, Wilbur B. Fox, Henry Lovell, Mary Hanna Morgan, and George Pointer.

In 1919 her husband was killed in a motor accident. In 1922, in London, she married George Albert Morgan, an Australian-born actor. When her publisher was taken over by Boosey & Hawkes in 1925, she became one of their few composers on an annual retainer. In the next 18 years she published 400 compositions, mainly ballads. Dame Nellie Melba, Peter Dawson, John Charles Thomas and other singers recorded her songs, many of which were chosen as items for school concerts in the United Kingdom, Australia and the United States.

She made settings of poems by William Blake, Robert Browning, Robert Herrick, Walter de la Mare, Dorothea Mackellar and living lyricists such as Helen Taylor, Madge Dickson (her sister), and P. J. O'Reilly. Helen Taylor was her most frequent collaborator, including "Bless This House" (1927). This simple song became world-famous in recordings by singers such as John McCormack, Peter Dawson, Jan Peerce, Beniamino Gigli and Josef Locke, through to Vera Lynn, Doris Day and Perry Como, and continues its popularity in the present day, with recordings by Benjamin Luxon, Leontyne Price, Lesley Garrett and Bryn Terfel.

She wrote musical comedies, including Castles in Spain, with a libretto by Sydney and Muriel Box. She returned to Australia in 1939 and lived in semi-retirement. She lived comfortably from song royalties. She died at Bellevue Hill, New South Wales in 1956; she was survived by two sons and a daughter of her first marriage and a son of her second.

In 2018, it was revealed that her daughter Marita, under her married surname Perigoe, had spent the Second World War in London believing that she was a Nazi spy. Perigoe had in fact been duped by an agent of MI5 in what was known as the Fifth Column operation.

== Musical compositions using the name May H. Brahe (incomplete) ==
=== Songs ===
- As I Went a'Roaming (Helen Taylor), Enoch & Sons publisher
- Beaux and Belles (Helen Taylor)
  - The Country Dance
- Bless This House (Helen Taylor)
- By Road and River, 5 songs (Helen Taylor)
  - O Western Wind!
  - Red Roofs
- The Call of the Maytime (Helen Taylor)
- Children of All Nations (Lucie Smith)
- Close Thine Eyes (adapted from lyrics by King Charles I of England)
- Coming Home Along (Nancie B. Marsland)
- Country Folk (Helen Taylor)
- Cradle Me Low (Helen Taylor)
- Cuckoo Calls (Helen Taylor)
- The Days of Old (Porter Emerson Brown)
- Down Here (P. J. O'Reilly), Enoch & Sons publisher
- Evening Shadows (Jean Crichton)
- The Everlasting Love (Helen Taylor)
- Four Songs from "Peacock Pie" (Walter de la Mare)
  - The Old Stone House
- From Far and Near (Alban Gordon)
- Galloping Dreary Dun (adapted by P. J. O'Reilly)
- Give Me Your Hand (George Cooper)
- Good-bye, and God be with You (P. J. O'Reilly)
- Guess You Know (Helen Taylor)
- The Haunting Little Tune (Harold George)
- I Passed by your Window (Helen Taylor), Enoch & Sons publisher
- I Thought I'd Forgotten (But Still I Remember) (Helen Taylor)
- I Walked in My Garden (Harold George)
- In a Month of Sundays (Dorothy Dickinson)
- A Japanese Love Song (Madge Dickson), Enoch & Sons publisher, 1910
- Jennifer (Royden Barrie)
- Keep Thou My Heart (Edward Lockton)
- Last Night (Shirley Darbyshire)
- A Leafy Wood (Jean Lucas)
- Life's Balcony (Helen Taylor)
- Listen, Mary (Constance Wilford)
- Little Bird (Dorothy Harrison)
- A Little Green Lane (Desmond Carter)
- Little Lamb (William Blake)
- Look Up to the Sunrise (Edward Lockton)
- Love and Life, 5 little songs
- Love Me Little, Love Me Long (Anonymous)
- Marjorie (Walter Learned)
- Matthew, Mark, Luke and John (adapted by Walter de la Mare)
- Messengers (Helen Taylor)
- My Dear Old Town (Arthur L. Salmon)
- A Northern Lament (Helen Taylor)
- Nothing to Say (Fred E. Weatherly)
- The Nutmeg Tree (adapted by Margaret Lucas)
- A Parting Prayer (John Marvell)
- My Prayer for You (Margaret Dickson)
- Off to the Greenwood (Helen Taylor)
- Oh, Pray for Peace (Helen Taylor)
- A Pageant of Summer, song cycle for 4 voices (Helen Taylor):
  - Meadowsweet
  - None-so-pretty
  - Traveller's Joy
- The Piper from Over the Way (Helen Taylor)
- A Prayer in Absence (Helen Taylor)
- The Queen (Alex C. Welsh)
- Real Australian Children Songs (Madge Dickson)
- Ring-Time (Helen Taylor)
- She is All So Slight (Richard Aldington)
- Shy Mignonette (Helen Taylor)
- Sitting at Home by the Fire (Helen Taylor)
- Sleep, Pretty Babe
- Song of a Cretan Warrior (Thomas Campbell)
- A Song of Exile (P. J. O'Reilly)
- Song Pictures, 5 songs (Helen Taylor)
  - I Passed By Your Window
  - To a Miniature
- Spindrift, 5 songs (Ethel Tindal Atkinson/Madge Dickson)
- Spring Blossoms, 4 little songs (Morris Hazlitt/Madge Dickson/Robert Herrick)
- Spring is on the Way (Jean Crichton)
- Sweet and Low
- That's All (Helen Taylor)
- There's a Whisper in the Air (Nancie B. Marsland)
- Through the April Meadows (Helen Taylor)
- Two Little Words (Helen Taylor)
- Two Songs (Robert Browning)
  - Oh, to be in England
  - The Year's at the Spring
- When I Hear a Song-Lark (Morris Hazlitt)
- The Wide Brown Land (Dorothea Mackellar)
- Years Ago (Helen Taylor)
- You'll Come Home Again (Harold George)
- Yours Alone (Helen Taylor)

=== Cantatas ===
- Dame Durden's School, juvenile cantata
- The Magic Wood, juvenile cantata

=== Musical comedy ===
- Castles in Spain, a South-American musical romance (libretto: Sydney Box, Montgomery Tully; lyrics: Harold V. Purcell, Muriel Box)

=== Piano solo ===
- Gay Pastorale
- Marita
- Minuet for Ninon
- Toy Town Patrol

== Musical compositions using the name Stanley Dickson ==
- Crying for the Moon (Dorothy M. Tweedale)
- Dancing Days (Helen Taylor)
- God Bless You (Kathleen Stuart)
- Little Brown Cottage (Greatrex Newman)
- Thanks Be to God (P. J. O'Reilly)

== Musical compositions using the name Alison Dodd ==
- Invitation (Rose Fyleman)
