= Bless This House (song) =

Song by John McCormack
- Published: 1927
- Composer: May Brahe
- Lyricist: Helen Taylor

"Bless This House" is a song published in 1927. The words were written by Englishwoman Helen Taylor, under the original title "Bless the House". The music was composed by Australian May Brahe, a friend of Taylor's.

One of the first artists to record the song was tenor John McCormack who recorded it on September 16, 1932 in London with Edwin Schneider on piano.

In the United States, this song is strongly associated with Thanksgiving and is often sung around this time. It is frequently found in spiritual/inspirational collections, such as the Doris Day album You'll Never Walk Alone and the Perry Como album I Believe, as well as in many Hymnals. It was a favourite of Vera Lynn, British WW2 "Forces Sweetheart" and appears on her album Favourite Sacred Songs (1972). Australian duo Generation Gap (Australian tenor Jim Hopkin and pianist Stephen Lightbody) also recorded a version of the song which appears on their 2009 album A New Beginning.

Other singers to record it include Gracie Fields, Peter Dawson, Jan Peerce, Beniamino Gigli, Josef Locke, Benjamin Luxon, Leontyne Price, Steve Conway, Harry Secombe (for his album Sacred Songs), Rosemary Clooney, Lesley Garrett, Bryn Terfel, Joe Feeney, and Stuart Burrows.
