= Night's Black Agent =

1961 novel

Night’s Black Agent
- First US edition
- Author: John Bingham
- Language: English
- Genre: Thriller
- Publisher: Gollancz (UK); Dodd, Mead (US)
- Publication date: 1961
- Publication place: United Kingdom
- Media type: Print

Night’s Black Agent is a 1961 thriller novel by the British writer John Bingham.

== Bibliography ==
- Reilly, John M. Twentieth Century Crime & Mystery Writers. Springer, 2015.
- West, Nigel. The A to Z of British Intelligence. Scarecrow Press, 2009.
