= My Name Is Michael Sibley =

1952 novel

- First edition
- Author: John Bingham
- Language: English
- Genre: Thriller
- Publisher: Gollancz
- Publication date: 1952
- Publication place: United Kingdom
- Media type: Print

My Name Is Michael Sibley is a 1952 mystery thriller novel by the British writer John Bingham, his debut.

Michael Sibley is suspected by the police of murdering John Prosset who he had known since schooldays, and with whom he had a complex relationship.

== Bibliography ==
- West, Nigel. The A to Z of British Intelligence. Scarecrow Press, 2009.
