= Spectre (soundtrack) =

Spectre: Original Motion Picture Soundtrack

Soundtrack album by Thomas Newman
- Released: 23 October 2015 (UK); 6 November 2015 (US)
- Recorded: 2015, Abbey Road Studios, London
- Genre: Film score
- Length: 79:43
- Labels: Decca Records; Universal Music Classics
- Producer: Thomas Newman

Thomas Newman chronology
Bridge of Spies (2015)	Spectre: Original Motion Picture Soundtrack (2015)	Finding Dory (2016)

Professional ratings
Review scores
Source	Rating
AllMusic	3.5/5 stars

Spectre: Original Motion Picture Soundtrack is the soundtrack album to the 24th James Bond film of the same name. Released by Universal Music Classics on 23 October 2015 in the United Kingdom and on 6 November 2015 in the United States, the music was composed by Thomas Newman, who previously composed the soundtrack of the 23rd Bond film Skyfall, making him the third composer after John Barry and David Arnold (and the first non-British composer) to score more than one film in the series. The film's theme song "Writing's on the Wall" performed by Sam Smith is the fourth theme song (not counting instrumental-only theme songs) that doesn't feature the title of its film in the lyrics. It is also the third song after Chris Cornell's "You Know My Name" from Casino Royale (2006) and Adele's "Skyfall" from the film of the same name (2012) that did not appear on the film's official soundtrack album.

== Development ==
Thomas Newman returned as Spectre's composer after scoring Skyfall, the previous James Bond installment in 2012. Rather than composing the score once the film had moved into post-production, Newman worked during filming. The theatrical trailer released in July 2015 contained a rendition of John Barry's 1969 On Her Majesty's Secret Service theme. Spectre director Sam Mendes revealed that the final film would have more than one hundred minutes of music. London Voices provided the choral element to the soundtrack, most noticeably in "Backfire".

In September 2015 it was announced that Sam Smith and regular collaborator Jimmy Napes had written the film's title theme, "Writing's on the Wall", with Smith performing it for the film. The song was released later that month where it received mixed reviews from critics and fans, particularly in comparison to Adele's "Skyfall". It became the first Bond theme to reach number one in the UK Singles Chart.

== Track listing ==
All tracks are written by Thomas Newman, except "Writing's on the Wall", written by Sam Smith and James Napier. "Day of the Dead" words by Bill Bernstein and Tambuco. Score contains interpolations of "The James Bond Theme", written by Monty Norman.

Standard album
No.	Title	Length
1.	"Los Muertos Vivos Están (Note: contains the "James Bond Theme", originally composed for the Dr. No soundtrack)"	2:46
2.	"Vauxhall Bridge "	2:18
3.	"The Eternal City "	4:32
4.	"Donna Lucia"	2:02
5.	"A Place Without Mercy"	1:03
6.	"Backfire "	4:52
7.	"Crows Klinik"	1:41
8.	"The Pale King"	2:54
9.	"Madeleine"	2:57
10.	"Kite in a Hurricane"	2:08
11.	"Snow Plane "	5:23
12.	"L'Americain "	1:41
13.	"Secret Room"	5:21
14.	"Hinx"	1:20
15.	"Writing's on the Wall (Instrumental)"	2:09
16.	"Silver Wraith"	2:14
17.	"A Reunion"	5:34
18.	"Day of the Dead" (featuring Tambuco)	1:24
19.	"Tempus Fugit"	1:20
20.	"Safe House "	3:54
21.	"Blindfold"	1:27
22.	"Careless"	4:37
23.	"Detonation "	3:52
24.	"Westminster Bridge "	4:13
25.	"Out of Bullets"	1:50
26.	"Spectre (End Title)"	5:36
Total length:		79:43

"A" contains the "James Bond Theme", originally composed for the Dr. No soundtrack

== See also ==
- James Bond music
- Outline of James Bond
