= Music of the James Bond series =

Since its inception in 1962, the James Bond film series from Eon Productions has featured many musical compositions, many of which are now considered classic pieces of British film music. The best known is the "James Bond Theme" composed by Monty Norman. Other instrumentals, such as "On Her Majesty's Secret Service", and various songs performed by British or American artists such as Shirley Bassey's "Goldfinger", Nancy Sinatra's "You Only Live Twice", Paul McCartney and Wings' "Live and Let Die", Carly Simon's "Nobody Does It Better", Sheena Easton's "For Your Eyes Only", Duran Duran's "A View to a Kill", Gladys Knight's "Licence to Kill", and Tina Turner's "GoldenEye" also became identified with the series.

Three Bond songs have won the Academy Award for Best Original Song: "Skyfall" by Adele, "Writing's on the Wall" by Sam Smith and "No Time to Die" by Billie Eilish. "Writing's on the Wall" and "No Time To Die" are the only Bond themes to reach number one on the UK singles chart, while "A View to a Kill" is the only Bond song to have reached number one on the US Billboard Hot 100. AllMusic categorised Bond themes as spy music.

== Music from Eon Productions ==
=== "James Bond Theme" ===
The "James Bond Theme" is the signature theme of the James Bond films and has featured in every Eon Productions Bond film since Dr. No, released in 1962. The piece is used as an accompanying fanfare to the gun barrel sequence in every Eon Bond film prior to Casino Royale (2006).

=== "James Bond Is Back" ===
The briefest of "James Bond themes", this composition starts off the "Opening Titles" music of From Russia with Love (1963). It can be heard in the trailer for the 1969 film On Her Majesty's Secret Service, as well as in the pre-title sequences of Tomorrow Never Dies (1997) and Die Another Day (2002). WLS (AM) used the theme in the mid-1960s for its secret agent radio serial program "The Wild Adventures of Peter Fugitive" that appeared on The Art Roberts Show.

=== "007 Theme" ===
"007 Theme", also known as "007 Takes the Lektor", is an adventure theme composed by John Barry in 1963 for the Bond film From Russia with Love. "The John Barry Seven" had pop chart hit with a cover version of Elmer Bernstein's theme to The Magnificent Seven that included seven beats repeated throughout the theme. Barry used seven beats throughout the "007 Theme".

It became a secondary theme for the Bond films, being used throughout the series, primarily during action scenes. Its most notable appearances are:

- From Russia with Love – played during the gypsy camp gunfight and also during James Bond (Sean Connery)'s theft of the Lektor decoder from the Russian embassy in Istanbul.
- Thunderball – played briefly in a climactic underwater fight; a similar but different theme of seven beats is played when Bond runs from SPECTRE during a parade and during the climax.
- You Only Live Twice – played during the flight of "Little Nellie" before Bond battles four helicopters that attack him.
- Diamonds Are Forever – played during Bond's destruction of Ernst Stavro Blofeld (Charles Gray)'s Headquarters.
- Moonraker – played during the Amazon River chase.

The theme has not been used in its entirety in a Bond film since its use in Moonraker.

This piece of music was also used by Al Primo, the news director at KYW-TV in Philadelphia for its long-time theme to Eyewitness News, and was adopted by other Group W stations in Baltimore, Pittsburgh, Boston and San Francisco as well as other non-Group W stations, including WLS-TV in Chicago. The theme was also sampled by Big Audio Dynamite for the 1986 song "Sightsee M.C!" from their album No. 10, Upping St.

=== "Suspense" motif ===
Like John Barry, David Arnold has left his own mark in the music of James Bond. In this case, he has established what can be called the "suspense motif", which is a descending, often repetitive four-note motif that can be heard in all of the Bond films he has scored. This motif can be heard in:

- Tomorrow Never Dies – "Station Break", "*-3-Send", "Underwater Discovery"
- The World Is Not Enough – "Pipeline", "Remember Pleasure", "Torture Queen", "Submarine"
- Die Another Day – "Death of Moon", "Iced Inc", "Antonov"
- Casino Royale – "Miami International", "Dirty Martini", and very briefly in "African Rundown"
- Quantum of Solace – briefly in "Time to Get Out", and twice in "Perla de las dunas"

=== Composers ===
The largest contributions to the Bond films, save for the "James Bond Theme", are works from John Barry. Barry composed eleven Bond soundtracks and is credited with the creation of "007" (dominated by brass and percussion) and the popular orchestral theme from On Her Majesty's Secret Service.

Next to Barry, David Arnold is the series' most regular composer. He composed the scores for five Bond films: Tomorrow Never Dies through Quantum of Solace. His orchestrations combined with electronic rhythm elements gave the Pierce Brosnan era its musical identity. John Barry recommended Arnold to producer Barbara Broccoli when she took over the Bond films from her father, Albert R. Broccoli.

Other major composers and record-producers include George Martin, Bill Conti, Michael Kamen, Marvin Hamlisch, Éric Serra, Thomas Newman and Hans Zimmer. Each of these composed for only one Bond film, with the exception of Newman. The departures from John Barry had various causes; sometimes Barry declined in order to avoid paying double income tax—US and UK. Barry died in 2011. Sometimes the director of a Bond film had worked with the composer of his choice on other films – the latter happened to Thomas Newman with Skyfall and Spectre.

Film	Year	Score composer
Dr. No	1962	Monty Norman
From Russia with Love	1963	John Barry
Goldfinger	1964	John Barry
Thunderball	1965	John Barry
You Only Live Twice	1967	John Barry
On Her Majesty's Secret Service	1969	John Barry
Diamonds Are Forever	1971	John Barry
Live and Let Die	1973	George Martin
The Man with the Golden Gun	1974	John Barry
The Spy Who Loved Me	1977	Marvin Hamlisch
Moonraker	1979	John Barry
For Your Eyes Only	1981	Bill Conti
Octopussy	1983	John Barry
A View to a Kill	1985	John Barry
The Living Daylights	1987	John Barry
Licence to Kill	1989	Michael Kamen
GoldenEye	1995	Éric Serra
Tomorrow Never Dies	1997	David Arnold
The World Is Not Enough	1999	David Arnold
Die Another Day	2002	David Arnold
Casino Royale	2006	David Arnold
Quantum of Solace	2008	David Arnold
Skyfall	2012	Thomas Newman
Spectre	2015	Thomas Newman
No Time to Die	2021	Hans Zimmer

=== Title themes ===
The "James Bond Theme" is the main theme for Dr. No, and has featured in all the Eon Productions Bond films in different versions. The theme has also featured on the gun barrel sequences at the beginning of the films. The original theme was written by Monty Norman, and was performed by John Barry and his orchestra in 1962. In the opening credits of Dr. No, two other pieces were played: an untitled bongo interlude and a Calypso-flavoured rendition of "Three Blind Mice", titled "Kingston Calypso". Due to this, Dr. No is the only film to have more than one opening theme. The "James Bond Theme" reached No. 13 in the UK singles chart, and remained in the charts for 13 weeks.

The opening credits of From Russia with Love were accompanied by an instrumental version of the main theme, arranged by John Barry and written by Lionel Bart. A single by The John Barry Orchestra reached No. 39 in the U.K. At the film's end, a vocal version by English singer Matt Monro is heard. This song spent 13 weeks in the U.K. charts, peaking at No. 20.

Goldfinger was the third soundtrack composed by John Barry, and this time the theme song had lyrics written by Anthony Newley and Leslie Bricusse. The soundtrack reached No. 1 on the Billboard 200 and spent 70 weeks on the charts. It also peaked at No. 14 on the UK Albums Chart, and received the Bond series first Grammy Award nomination, Best Original Score from a Motion Picture or Television Show at the 7th Annual Grammy Awards.

Welsh singer Shirley Bassey is the only singer to perform more than one Bond theme – she recorded the themes to Goldfinger, Diamonds Are Forever, and Moonraker. Bassey also recorded her own version of "Mr. Kiss Kiss Bang Bang" for Thunderball and it was rumoured that her song "No Good About Goodbye" from her 2009 album The Performance was intended for Quantum of Solace, however David Arnold said "No Good About Goodbye" was never intended as a Bond song.

Paul McCartney and Wings' performance of "Live and Let Die" was the first Bond theme song to be nominated for an Academy Award for Best Original Song at the 46th Academy Awards; it reached No. 2 as a U.S. single on the Billboard Hot 100, and No. 9 on the U.K. charts. George Martin's work in the song won the Grammy for Best Arrangement Accompanying Vocalists at the 16th Annual Grammy Awards.

Marvin Hamlisch's (music) and Carole Bayer Sager's (lyrics) "Nobody Does It Better" (performed by Carly Simon) from The Spy Who Loved Me received a nomination for the Academy Award for Best Original Song at the 50th Academy Awards, as did Bill Conti's "For Your Eyes Only" at the 54th Academy Awards, which was performed by Sheena Easton in the film For Your Eyes Only.

It was not until the 2013 Oscars that a Bond theme song finally won the Academy Award for Best Original Song: the theme song from Skyfall by Adele at the 85th Academy Awards. Thomas Newman's score also got the first nomination for Academy Award for Best Original Score in the series since Hamlisch's own for The Spy Who Loved Me, while winning the Grammy Award for Best Score Soundtrack for Visual Media at the 56th Annual Grammy Awards. Adele's song also won the Grammy Award for Best Song Written for Visual Media. Sam Smith's "Writing's on the Wall" from Spectre and Billie Eilish's "No Time to Die" from the film of the same name would also win Oscars for Best Original Song at the 88th Academy Awards and 94th Academy Awards respectively.

Duran Duran and John Barry's "A View To A Kill" topped the singles charts in the U.S. Billboard Hot 100, the only Bond theme to hit No. 1 in the United States. No James Bond theme had topped the charts in the UK until Sam Smith's "Writing's on the Wall" entered the charts at number one on 2 October 2015.

Several of the later films have alternative theme songs, often during the closing credits. The Living Daylights featured The Pretenders performing "If There Was a Man," composed by John Barry with Chrissie Hynde. Licence to Kill has "If You Asked Me To" sung by Patti LaBelle. GoldenEye featured Éric Serra's "The Experience of Love". Tomorrow Never Dies included k.d. lang's "Surrender" during the closing credits, a song which was originally proposed by composer David Arnold to be the title sequence theme instead of the Sheryl Crow title song. The "Surrender" theme is heard throughout the score while the melody of Sheryl Crow's song is not used again during the film. This harks back to the Thunderball soundtrack, where "Mr. Kiss Kiss Bang Bang" was originally proposed as the opening credits music, only to be replaced by the eponymous title track as sung by Tom Jones.

On Her Majesty's Secret Service featured an instrumental theme tune, something which remains unique amongst the post–From Russia with Love films, and included a vocal theme in the form of Louis Armstrong's performance of "We Have All the Time in the World", written by John Barry and Hal David.

Film	Year	Score composer	Title song	Composed by	Performed by	UK peak position	US peak position
Dr. No (soundtrack)	1962	Monty Norman	"James Bond Theme"	Monty Norman	John Barry & Orchestra; Monty Norman	13	—
Dr. No (soundtrack)	1962	Monty Norman	"Kingston Calypso Arrangement of "Three Blind Mice"	Monty Norman	Byron Lee and the Dragonaires	—	—
From Russia with Love (soundtrack)	1963	John Barry	"Opening Titles: James Bond Is Back/From Russia with Love/James Bond Theme"	John Barry; Lionel Bart; Monty Norman	John Barry (title sequence) Matt Monro	20	—
Goldfinger (soundtrack)	1964	John Barry	"Goldfinger"	Leslie Bricusse; Anthony Newley; John Barry	Shirley Bassey	21	8
Thunderball (soundtrack)	1965	John Barry	"Thunderball"	John Barry; Don Black	Tom Jones	35	25
You Only Live Twice (soundtrack)	1967	John Barry	"You Only Live Twice"	John Barry; Leslie Bricusse	Nancy Sinatra (charted single is produced by Lee Hazlewood and arranged by Billy Strange and in marked contrast to soundtrack version)	11	44
On Her Majesty's Secret Service (soundtrack)	1969	John Barry	"On Her Majesty's Secret Service"	John Barry	The John Barry Orchestra	—	—
Diamonds Are Forever (soundtrack)	1971	John Barry	"Diamonds Are Forever"	John Barry; Don Black	Shirley Bassey	38	57
Live and Let Die (soundtrack)	1973	George Martin	"Live and Let Die"	Paul McCartney; Linda McCartney	Paul McCartney & Wings	9	2
The Man with the Golden Gun (soundtrack)	1974	John Barry	"The Man with the Golden Gun"	John Barry; Don Black	Lulu	—	—
The Spy Who Loved Me (soundtrack)	1977	Marvin Hamlisch	"Nobody Does It Better"	Marvin Hamlisch; Carole Bayer Sager	Carly Simon	7	2
Moonraker (soundtrack)	1979	John Barry	"Moonraker"	John Barry; Hal David	Shirley Bassey	—	—
For Your Eyes Only (soundtrack)	1981	Bill Conti	"For Your Eyes Only"	Bill Conti; Mick Leeson	Sheena Easton	8	4
Octopussy (soundtrack)	1983	John Barry	"All Time High"	John Barry; Tim Rice	Rita Coolidge	75	36
A View to a Kill (soundtrack)	1985	John Barry	"A View to a Kill"	John Barry; Duran Duran	Duran Duran	2	1
The Living Daylights (soundtrack)	1987	John Barry	"The Living Daylights"	John Barry; Pål Waaktaar	A-ha	5	—
Licence to Kill (soundtrack)	1989	Michael Kamen	"Licence to Kill"	Narada Michael Walden; Jeffrey Cohen; Walter Afanasieff	Gladys Knight	6	—
GoldenEye (soundtrack)	1995	Éric Serra	"GoldenEye"	Bono; The Edge	Tina Turner	10	102
Tomorrow Never Dies (soundtrack)	1997	David Arnold	"Tomorrow Never Dies"	Sheryl Crow; Mitchell Froom	Sheryl Crow	12	—
The World Is Not Enough (soundtrack)	1999	David Arnold	"The World Is Not Enough"	David Arnold; Don Black	Garbage	11	—
Die Another Day (soundtrack)	2002	David Arnold	"Die Another Day"	Madonna; Mirwais Ahmadzaï	Madonna	3	8
Casino Royale (soundtrack)	2006	David Arnold	"You Know My Name"	David Arnold; Chris Cornell	Chris Cornell	7	79
Quantum of Solace (soundtrack)	2008	David Arnold	"Another Way to Die"	Jack White	Jack White; Alicia Keys	9	81
Skyfall (soundtrack)	2012	Thomas Newman	"Skyfall"	Adele; Paul Epworth	Adele	2	8
Spectre (soundtrack)	2015	Thomas Newman	"Writing's on the Wall"	Sam Smith; Jimmy Napes	Sam Smith	1	71
No Time to Die (soundtrack)	2021	Hans Zimmer	"No Time to Die"	Billie Eilish; Finneas O'Connell	Billie Eilish	1	16

- A song titled "Mr. Kiss Kiss Bang Bang" sung by Shirley Bassey was originally slated to be the theme song of Thunderball. It was re-recorded by Dionne Warwick, but Albert R. Broccoli insisted the theme song must include the film's title and also decided that the lyrics should not start before the film's title Thunderball appears on-screen. A new song was composed and recorded at the eleventh hour titled "Thunderball", performed by Tom Jones. The melody of "Mr. Kiss Kiss Bang Bang" remains a major component of the film score.
- The songs "Three Blind Mice" (Dr. No), "All Time High" (Octopussy), "You Know My Name" (Casino Royale), "Another Way to Die" (Quantum of Solace) and "Writing's on the Wall" (Spectre) do not feature the title of its film either in the song title or lyrics (although "Another Way to Die" features the word "solace" in the second stanza). While not named after the film, "Nobody Does It Better" does feature the line "the spy who loved me" in its lyrics.
- "You Know My Name", "Skyfall", and "Writing's on the Wall" do not appear on their respective films' soundtrack albums, having been released as standalone singles instead.
- "No Time to Die" was released in February 2020 when the movie was scheduled to be released in April 2020. The movie release was delayed during the COVID-19 pandemic to Fall of 2021.

=== Secondary songs ===
A number of Bond films include one (or more) additional songs in the soundtrack. Some of these pieces of music, such as "We Have All the Time in the World" by Louis Armstrong, have gone on to become as well known as the main themes, while other songs remain exclusively linked to the film in which they appear.

Film	Title	Year	Performed by
Dr. No	"Three Blind Mice^{1}" "Jump Up!" "Jamaican Rock" "Under the Mango Tree" _{1 'Three Blind Mice' is a.k.a. the 'Kingston Calypso'}	1962	Byron Lee and the Dragonaires; Monty Norman; Diana Coupland
From Russia with Love	"From Russia with Love" (End Credits)	1963	Matt Monro
Thunderball	"Mr. Kiss Kiss Bang Bang"	1965	Dionne Warwick and another version by Shirley Bassey (not on soundtrack, only instrumental version appears in film)
On Her Majesty's Secret Service	"We Have All the Time in the World" "Do You Know How Christmas Trees Are Grown?"	1969	Louis Armstrong; Nina
For Your Eyes Only	"Make It Last All Night"	1981	Rage
A View to a Kill	"California Girls" (not on soundtrack)	1985	Gidea Park
The Living Daylights	"Where Has Everybody Gone?" "If There Was a Man"	1987	Pretenders
Licence to Kill	"If You Asked Me To" "Wedding Party" "Dirty Love"	1989	Patti LaBelle; Ivory; Tim Feehan
GoldenEye	"The Experience of Love" "James Bond Theme" (GoldenEye trailer version)	1995	Éric Serra; Starr Parodi and Jeff Fair (used in teasers, not in film)
Tomorrow Never Dies	"Surrender" "James Bond Theme"	1997	k.d. lang Moby (trailer music)
The World Is Not Enough	"Only Myself to Blame" "James Bond Theme" (End Title) "Sweetest Coma Again" (Japanese End Title)	1999	Scott Walker (original end credits song, not in film); David Arnold (not on soundtrack); Luna Sea (only on Japanese soundtrack)
Die Another Day	"London Calling" "James Bond Theme (Bond vs. Oakenfold)"	2002	The Clash (not on soundtrack); Paul Oakenfold (trailer music)
No Time to Die	"We Have All the Time in the World"	2021	Louis Armstrong

- Matt Monro's vocal rendition of "From Russia with Love" is often considered the official theme song for that film, even though the opening credits use an instrumental version that also incorporates the "James Bond Theme". Monro's version isn't heard until about 15 minutes into the film over a radio as source music, and again over the closing titles.
- Dionne Warwick's performance of "Mr. Kiss Kiss Bang Bang" is never actually heard in Thunderball; it was originally intended to have been the opening credits theme, but this was changed when Albert R. Broccoli decreed the theme had to include the film's title. The melody of "Mr. Kiss Kiss Bang Bang" is heard throughout the film; Warwick's version was finally released in the 1990s.
- The original end title theme to The World Is Not Enough was "Only Myself to Blame", composed by David Arnold and Don Black, and sung by Scott Walker, but was left out of the final film and replaced by an Arnold arrangement of the "James Bond Theme". "Blame" was, however, left on The World Is Not Enough soundtrack album, and its melody, representing the Elektra King (Sophie Marceau) character, appears throughout The World Is Not Enough score, most prominently in the tracks "Casino" and "Elektra's Theme".

=== Foreign songs ===
Some songs have been dubbed for the foreign versions of the films.

Film	Original title	Translated title	Performer	Country
From Russia with Love	"From Russia with Love"	"Bons baisers de Russie" "Die Wolga ist weit" (not on DVD releases)	Bob Asklof; Ruth Berlé	France; Germany
On Her Majesty's Secret Service	"Do You Know How Christmas Trees Are Grown?"	"Savez-vous ce qu'il faut au sapin de Noël?" "Wovon träumt ein Weihnachtsbaum im Mai?" (on German DVD releases)	Isabelle Aubret; Katja Ebstein	France; Germany
Diamonds Are Forever	"Diamonds Are Forever"	"Vivo di diamanti"	Shirley Bassey	Italy

- "Goldfinger" was sung in Spanish by Karina (María Isabel Llaudes Santiago), a French version was sung by both John William and Catherine Elia and an Italian version was recorded by Vanna Scotti.
- "Feuerball" sung by Alan Corb was, in 1965, the German cover version of "Thunderball" (sung by Tom Jones). The B-side of the single contained a German version, also sung by Alan Corb, of "Mr. Kiss Kiss Bang Bang" with that title, creating the bizarre situation that a vocal 'cover' version of the song was published before the original vocal version(s) (sung by both by Shirley Bassey and Dionne Warwick), which were both published in the early 1990s with The Best of Bond... James Bond 30th Anniversary and 30th Anniversary Limited Edition albums.
- "Man Lebt Nur Zweimal" sung by Gissy André was, in 1967, the German cover version of "You Only Live Twice" (sung by Nancy Sinatra).
- "Tu vivras deux fois" sung by Lucky Blondo was, in 1967, the French cover version of "You Only Live Twice" (sung by Nancy Sinatra).
- "In Deinen Augen", sung by Sollie Nero, was, in 1981, the German cover version of "For Your Eyes Only" (sung by Sheena Easton).

=== Additional music ===
Film	Title	Score composer
The Spy Who Loved Me	"Lawrence of Arabia Theme" "Lara's Theme" (Music box) "Concerto for Piano N°21" (Elvira Madigan) – Andante "Air on the G String"	Maurice Jarre; Maurice Jarre; Wolfgang Amadeus Mozart; Johann Sebastian Bach
Moonraker	"Close Encounters of the Third Kind Theme" "The Magnificent Seven Theme" "Prelude No. 15 (Raindrop prelude)" Tritsch-Tratsch-Polka; Romeo and Juliet Overture	John Williams; Elmer Bernstein; Frédéric Chopin; Johann Strauss II; Pyotr Ilyich Tchaikovsky
A View to a Kill	"The Four Seasons" "Swan Lake"	Antonio Vivaldi; Pyotr Ilyich Tchaikovsky
The Living Daylights	"40th Symphony in G minor" (1st movement) "Finale-Act II-Le Nozze di Figaro" "String Quartet in D major" "Variations on a Rococo Theme"	Wolfgang Amadeus Mozart Alexander Borodin; Pyotr Ilyich Tchaikovsky
GoldenEye	"Stand By Your Man" (Minnie Driver)	Billy Sherrill / Tammy Wynette
Tomorrow Never Dies	It Had to Be You" (Instrumental)	Gus Kahn / Isham Jones
Skyfall	"Boom Boom" (John Lee Hooker song)	The Animals

=== Unused songs ===
A number of songs have been recorded for Bond films but not used.

- "Mr. Kiss Kiss Bang Bang" by Dionne Warwick and Shirley Bassey was written for Thunderball. Its title refers to a nickname given to Bond by an Italian journalist in 1962. Warwick and Bassey both recorded versions, but halfway through the scoring process, producer Albert R. Broccoli decided that the film's title must appear in the lyrics, so "Thunderball" was commissioned. The song's melody still plays a prominent role in the score and both singers' versions have appeared on compilations in the 1990s.
- "Thunderball" by Johnny Cash
- "Run James Run" by Brian Wilson, intended as a Bond theme, but ultimately released as the eponymous track on the Beach Boys' album Pet Sounds.
- "You Only Live Twice" by Julie Rogers is included on the 30th-anniversary release of The Best of Bond... James Bond.
- "You Only Live Twice" by Lorraine Chandler appears on R(are) C(ollectable) A(nd Soulful) Volume 2.
- "The Man with the Golden Gun" by Alice Cooper appears on their 1973 album Muscle of Love
- "For Your Eyes Only" by Blondie was written for the film of the same name, but rejected. Blondie's version of their song appears on their 1982 album The Hunter.
- "The Living Daylights" by Pet Shop Boys was adapted from a demo theme for The Living Daylights, later reworked as "This Must Be the Place I Waited Years to Leave". It appears on their 1990 album Behaviour.
- "The Juvenile" by Ace of Base was originally written in 1995 as "The Goldeneye", then rewritten as "The Juvenile" and released in 2002 on Da Capo.
- "Tomorrow Never Lies" by Pulp, originally titled "Tomorrow Never Dies", was released as a B-side on their 1997 single "Help the Aged", and on the vinyl version of their 1998 album This Is Hardcore.
- "Tomorrow Never Dies" by Saint Etienne appears on their Built on Sand album. The liner notes state that Pierce Brosnan kept the master tape of the song. Other artists who submitted Tomorrow Never Dies themes include Marc Almond, Swan Lee, the Cardigans and Space.
- "Man of War" by Radiohead was submitted for Spectre, but it was rejected as it had not been written for the film, making it ineligible for an Academy Award for Best Original Song. Radiohead submitted another song, "Spectre", but it was rejected as too melancholic.
- "24" by Lana Del Rey was also written for Spectre, but was also rejected. It was instead released on her 2015 album Honeymoon.

=== Cover versions and spin-offs ===
Bond music has inspired cover albums in a variety of genres, including the 2007 album Mister Bond – A Jazzy Cocktail of Ice Cold Themes (lounge) and Shaken and Stirred: The David Arnold James Bond Project, the latter of which features David Arnold collaborating with several contemporary artists. The City of Prague Philharmonic Orchestra recorded several albums with Bond music and performs in premieres and special events of Bond films. Britain's Royal Philharmonic Orchestra released an album of several Bond songs performances called Best Of James Bond, some of which were used on the menus of "Ultimate Edition" DVD releases. Billy Strange released "Secret Agent File" in 1965. In 2004, The Cavaliers played a show titled 007 using Bond music such as "GoldenEye", "For Your Eyes Only", "Live and Let Die", "Hovercraft Chase", "Welcome to Cuba" and "Paris and Bond". Some of them are Italo disco-like rhythms and soundtrack albums promote hits that matches the film's theme. In 2000, An Electronika Tribute to James Bond' album was released adding yet another genre to the Bond fandom.

Title	Performer(s)
"James Bond Theme"	Billy Strange; Neil Norman; The Art of Noise; Naked City; The Skatalites; The Selecter; Bond; Count Basie; Moby; LTJ Bukem; City of Prague Philharmonic Orchestra; Soft Cell; The Ventures; Alizée (Sample in the song "J.B.G."); Royal Philharmonic Orchestra; Leningrad Cowboys; Hank Marvin (as part of a medley); The Flight
"From Russia with Love"	Natacha Atlas; Count Basie; Thomas Lang; Royal Philharmonic Orchestra; Hank Marvin (as part of a medley)
"Goldfinger"	Count Basie; Billy Strange; Bébé; Anthony Newley (original demo recording); Magazine; Royal Philharmonic Orchestra; Leningrad Cowboys; Hank Marvin; Alan Partridge; Chaka Khan
"Thunderball"	Martin Fry; Mr. Bungle; Shirley Bassey; The Kingpins; Guy Lombardo; Billy Strange; Royal Philharmonic Orchestra
"You Only Live Twice"	Soft Cell; Mark Burgess; Björk; Coldplay; Natacha Atlas; Robbie Williams (Sample in the song "Millennium"); Shirley Bassey; Trashcan Sinatras; Billy Strange; Eddie Peregrina; Royal Philharmonic Orchestra; Billy Mackenzie; Hank Marvin (as part of a medley); Mark Lanegan
"On Her Majesty's Secret Service"	Propellerheads; Vernian Process; Hank Marvin (as part of a medley); The Lee Thompson Ska Orchestra
"We Have All the Time in the World"	Fun Lovin' Criminals; The Pale Fountains; Iggy Pop; My Bloody Valentine; The Puppini Sisters
"Diamonds Are Forever"	David McAlmont; Arctic Monkeys; Kanye West (Sample in the song "Diamonds from Sierra Leone"); Royal Philharmonic Orchestra; Chaka Khan
"Live and Let Die"	Chrissie Hynde; Escala; Guns N' Roses; Geri Halliwell; Lizzy Borden; Butch Walker; Royal Philharmonic Orchestra; Hank Marvin
"The Man with the Golden Gun"	Emilíana Torrini; Funkstar De Luxe; Thin White Rope; Royal Philharmonic Orchestra
"Nobody Does It Better"	Radiohead; Aimee Mann; 8mm Alan Partridge; Me First and the Gimme Gimmes; Royal Philharmonic Orchestra
"Moonraker"	Shara Nelson; Neil Norman
"For Your Eyes Only"	Thomas Anders; Edenbridge; Royal Philharmonic Orchestra
"All Time High"	Pulp
"A View to a Kill"	Diablo; Leningrad Cowboys; Lostprophets; Northern Kings; Shirley Bassey; Tape Five (ft. Iain Mackenzie)
"The Living Daylights"	The Narrow; Royal Philharmonic Orchestra; Cassandra Steen; City of Prague Philharmonic Orchestra; Soho Strings; Ian Rich Orchestra; London Symphony Orchestra; London Starlight Orchestra
"Licence to Kill"	Count Basic
"If You Asked Me To"	Celine Dion
"GoldenEye"	Wise Guys; Bono (original demo recording); Royal Philharmonic Orchestra; Tina Arena; Nicole Scherzinger
"Tomorrow Never Dies"	Uwe Kröger
"The World Is Not Enough"	Jackie Moore
"You Know My Name"	Poets of the Fall
"Skyfall"	Within Temptation; Vitas
"Writing's On the Wall"	Conchita Wurst

== Non-Eon Productions songs ==
=== Main title themes ===
Film	Year	Score composer	Title song	Performed by
Casino Royale	1967	Burt Bacharach	"Casino Royale"	Herb Alpert and the Tijuana Brass
Never Say Never Again	1983	Michel Legrand	"Never Say Never Again"	Lani Hall

- The closing credits of Casino Royale use a vocal version of "Casino Royale" sung by Mike Redway, who remained uncredited until the release of the 2012 45th anniversary edition of the soundtrack.

=== Secondary songs ===
Film	Title	Year	Performed by
Casino Royale	"The Look of Love" "Dream on James, You're Winning"	1967	Dusty Springfield; Mike Redway
Never Say Never Again	"Une Chanson d'Amour"	1983	Sophie Della

- The soundtrack to the 1967 spoof Casino Royale also included two short comedic songs sung in a 1920s style. One led into an instrumental version of "The Look of Love" and began with the line "James Bond playing at Casino Royale..."; later, this tune was reprised as "Seven James Bonds at Casino Royale", which leads into a lyrical version of the theme sung by Mike Redway that played over the closing credits.
- "The Look of Love" was the first song from any Bond film to be nominated for the Academy Award for Best Original Song at the 40th Academy Awards, six years before the first nomination from an Eon Bond film. It remains the only song from a non-Eon Bond film so nominated.

=== Unused song ===
- "Never Say Never Again" by Phyllis Hyman was intended for Never Say Never Again.

== Video games ==
With the increase in audio quality for video game consoles and personal computers, in addition to the continued popularity of computer and video games, publisher Electronic Arts as well as Activision (since 2008) has included opening themes and film-style credit sequences to some of its more recent James Bond video games & spin offs.

Video game	Year	Score composer	Title song	Performed by
GoldenEye 007	1997	Graeme Norgate and Grant Kirkhope	"James Bond Theme"	
Tomorrow Never Dies	1999	Tommy Tallarico, Howard Ulyate, Sonic Mayhem, Todd Dennis	"Tomorrow Never Dies"	Sheryl Crow
The World Is Not Enough (Nintendo 64 and PlayStation)	2000	Neil Baldwin (Nintendo 64) and Don Veca (PlayStation)		
Agent Under Fire	2001	Don Veca	"James Bond Theme"	
Nightfire	2002	Steve Duckworth, Ed Lima, Jeff Tymoschuk	"Nearly Civilized"	Esthero
Everything or Nothing	2004	Sean Callery, Jeff Tymoschuk	"Everything or Nothing"	Mýa
GoldenEye: Rogue Agent	2004	Paul Oakenfold	"If You're Gonna..."	Natasha Bedingfield
From Russia with Love	2005	Christopher Lennertz	"From Russia with Love" (instrumental remix)	John Barry
Quantum of Solace	2008	Christopher Lennertz	"When Nobody Loves You"	Kerli
GoldenEye 007	2010	David Arnold, Kevin Kiner	"GoldenEye"	Nicole Scherzinger
Blood Stone	2010	Richard Jacques	"I'll Take It All"	Joss Stone
007 Legends	2012	David Arnold, Kevin Kiner	"Goldfinger" (instrumental remix)	David Arnold
First Light	2026	The Flight	"First Light"	Lana Del Rey

== Novels ==
The 2008 continuation novel Devil May Care by Sebastian Faulks was the first James Bond novel to receive its own theme song. Also called "Devil May Care", the song was written and recorded by Cardiff band SAL and was available on the UK audiobook release of the novel.

== See also ==
- Outline of James Bond
