= From Russia with Love (soundtrack) =

Soundtrack album by John Barry
- Released: 1963
- Recorded: March 1963
- Length: 34:20
- Labels: United Artists (LP); Liberty (1980's LP Reissue); EMI Manhattan Records (CD); Capitol (2002 CD Re-release)
- Producer: Frank Collura (Reissue)

John Barry chronology
The Cool Mikado	From Russia with Love	Zulu

Singles from From Russia With Love
- 1. "From Russia With Love" Released: 1963

Professional ratings
Review scores
Source	Rating
AllMusic	5/5 stars

From Russia with Love is the 1963 soundtrack for the second James Bond film, From Russia With Love. This is the first series film with John Barry as the primary soundtrack composer.

John Barry, arranger of Monty Norman's "James Bond Theme" for Dr. No, would be the dominant Bond series composer for most of its history and the inspiration for fellow series composer, David Arnold (who uses cues from this soundtrack in his own for Tomorrow Never Dies). The theme song was composed by Lionel Bart of Oliver! fame and sung by Matt Monro.

== Production ==
Following the decision of the producers not to use Monty Norman, though keeping his "James Bond Theme" from Dr. No, Harry Saltzman decided on using the then popular Lionel Bart of Oliver! fame to score the second James Bond installment From Russia With Love. Bart was unable to read or write music, but he offered to compose the music and lyrics for a title song to the film.

The producers Saltzman and Albert R. Broccoli chose John Barry to score the film. Barry had not only arranged and conducted the "James Bond Theme" from the previous film, but had already scored some films such as Beat Girl and Never Let Go. Barry's group also charted at No. 13 in the November 1962 UK Singles Chart with a different arrangement of the Bond theme from that heard in the film.

The title song was sung by Matt Monro. Monro's vocal version is played during the film (as source music on a radio) and properly over the film's end titles. The title credit music is a lively instrumental version of the tune preceded by a brief Barry-composed "James Bond Is Back" then segueing into the "James Bond Theme". On the original film soundtrack, Alan Haven played a jazzy organ over the theme but this version was not released on the soundtrack album. The tune also appears in a soft string arrangement as a theme for Tatiana Romanova (Daniela Bianchi). In Germany, the original release featured an end title track cover version called "Die Wolga ist Weit" sung by Ruthe Berlé.

From Russia with Love
A 15-second sample of "From Russia with Love", the title track. Reception towards the song was negative, though critics admitted the song, as the first Bond theme, "establish[ed] a tone" for future songs.

Originally planning to use local Turkish music as Norman had used Jamaican music on Dr. No, Barry accompanied the film crew to Istanbul, however he found nothing suitable for the film.

Recalling his visit to Istanbul, John Barry said, "It was like no place I'd ever been in my life. [The Trip] was supposedly to seep up the music, so Noel Rogers and I used to go 'round to these nightclubs and listen to all this stuff. We had the strangest week, and really came away with nothing, except a lot of ridiculous stories. We went back, talked to Lionel, and then he wrote 'From Russia with Love.''

== Album and cover versions ==
The soundtrack's original recordings are thought to be lost and did not appear when the Bond soundtrack albums were issued in remastered form on CD. The album is different from the film with the album's recording of the main titles sounding slower and not featuring the organ played by Alan Haven. Several tracks on the album do not appear in the completed film. The album was the last of the Bond soundtrack albums to feature more than the usual six tracks per record side.

The soundtrack album reached No. 28 on the Variety charts in March 1964 with the title song becoming Unart Music's most recorded song. Other cover versions of the "James Bond Theme" were also released to coincide with the film. Barry also released different cover versions of the title song and "007" on his Ember records for the pop charts. The Roland Shaw Orchestra performed cover versions of most of the music of Barry's soundtrack on several albums.

== Track listing ==
1. "Opening Titles: James Bond Is Back/From Russia with Love/James Bond Theme" (Note: Contains elements of the "James Bond Theme", originally composed for the Dr. No soundtrack.) (different arrangement from that heard in the film)
2. "Tania Meets Klebb"
3. "Meeting in St. Sophia"
4. "The Golden Horn" (Note: Not heard in the film.)
5. "Girl Trouble"
6. "Bond Meets Tania"
7. "007"
8. "Gypsy Camp"
9. "Death of Grant"
10. "From Russia with Love" – Matt Monro
11. "SPECTRE Island"
12. "Guitar Lament"
13. "Man Overboard/SMERSH in Action"
14. "James Bond with Bongos"
15. "Stalking"
16. "Leila Dances"
17. "Death of Kerim"
18. "007 Takes the Lektor"

* Not heard in the film

== Outside the film ==
- In 1965, KYW-TV in Philadelphia adopted the "007 Takes The Lektor" track as its longtime theme for its Eyewitness News format. It went on to be used in other Group W stations in Boston, Pittsburgh, Baltimore and San Francisco for their newscasts. Two years later, "007 Takes The Lektor" would be recycled for further Bond use, in the Little Nellie autogyro scene in You Only Live Twice.
- The 2003 Linkin Park song "Faint" uses a reversed sample of the track "Tania Meets Klebb" as its string intro.
- The podcast Mueller, She Wrote uses an instrumental version of the theme song as its intro and outro theme music. This serves as a humorous theme, as the podcast centres on Russian relations to the presidential campaign for Donald Trump in 2016, and the following special counsel investigation led by Robert Mueller.

== See also ==
- Outline of James Bond
