= I Like to Score =

Compilation album by Moby
- Released: October 21, 1997
- Genres: Electronica, techno
- Length: 47:47
- Labels: Mute; Elektra
- Producer: Moby

Moby chronology
| Animal Rights (1996) | I Like to Score (1997) | Play (1999) |

Professional ratings
Review scores
| Source | Rating |
|---|---|
| AllMusic | 3/5 stars |
| Chicago Sun-Times | 3/4 stars |
| Entertainment Weekly | B |
| Future Music | 7/10 |
| The Guardian | 3/5 stars |
| NME | 5/10 |
| Pitchfork | 8.6/10 |
| Q | 3/5 stars |
| Rolling Stone | 3.5/5 stars |
| Uncut | 3/5 stars |

I Like to Score is a compilation album by American electronica musician Moby. It was released on November 10, 1997 by Mute Records in the United Kingdom and on October 21, 1997 by Elektra Records in the United States. The album primarily consists of music recorded by Moby for use in film soundtracks.

== Track listing ==
All tracks are written by Moby, except where noted.

| No. | Title | Writer(s) | Notes | Length |
|---|---|---|---|---|
| 1. | "Novio" | | From Double Tap | 2:38 |
| 2. | "James Bond Theme (Moby's Re-Version)" | Monty Norman | From Tomorrow Never Dies | 3:23 |
| 3. | "Go" | Moby; Angelo Badalamenti; David Lynch | Features samples of "Laura Palmer's Theme" from Twin Peaks; re-recording | 3:59 |
| 4. | "Ah-Ah" | | From Cool World | 2:24 |
| 5. | "I Like to Score" | | From Double Tap | 2:21 |
| 6. | "Oil 1" | | From The Saint | 4:51 |
| 7. | "New Dawn Fades" | Ian Curtis | From Feeling So Real Remixes single | 5:34 |
| 8. | "God Moving Over the Face of the Waters (Heat Mix)" | | From That's When I Reach for My Revolver Remix single | 5:44 |
| 9. | "First Cool Hive" | | From Scream; alternate edit from the recording featured on Everything Is Wrong | 5:41 |
| 10. | "Nash" | | From Double Tap | 1:22 |
| 11. | "Love Theme" | | From Joe's Apartment | 4:36 |
| 12. | "Grace" | | From Space Water Onion | 5:24 |
| Total length: | | | | 47:47 |

== Personnel ==
Credits for I Like to Score adapted from album liner notes.

- Moby – production, recording, instruments
- Osho Endo – trombone on "James Bond Theme (Moby's Re-Version)"
- Rob Hardt – saxophone on "James Bond Theme (Moby's Re-Version)"
- MC Shah-King – vocals on "Ah-Ah"
- Alexander McCabe – saxophone on "James Bond Theme (Moby's Re-Version)"
- Daniel Miller – mixing on "James Bond Theme (Moby's Re-Version)"
- Alan Moulder – mixing on "James Bond Theme (Moby's Re-Version)"
- Greg Robinson – trombone on "James Bond Theme (Moby's Re-Version)"

Artwork and design

- Alli – art direction, design
- Jennifer Elster – styling
- Scott Frassetto – photography
- Adam Friedberg – photography

== Charts ==
| Chart (1997) | Peak position |
|---|---|
| French Albums (SNEP) | 83 |
| UK Albums (Official Charts) | 54 |
| US Heatseekers Albums (Billboard) | 22 |
