= Die Another Day (soundtrack) =

Album by David Arnold

Die Another Day: Music from the MGM Motion Picture

Soundtrack album by David Arnold
- Released: November 12, 2002
- Recorded: 2002
- Genres: Film music Spy music
- Length: 55:01
- Label: Warner Bros.

David Arnold chronology
Enough (2002)	Die Another Day: Music from the MGM Motion Picture (2002)	The Stepford Wives (2004)

Singles from Die Another Day
- 1. "Die Another Day" Released: October 22, 2002

Professional ratings
Review scores
Source	Rating
Allmusic	3/5 stars
Empire Online	3/5 stars
Filmtracks	1/5 stars

Die Another Day: Music from the MGM Motion Picture is the soundtrack for the 20th James Bond film of the same name, and was released by Warner Bros. Records on November 12, 2002.

Composer David Arnold made use of electronic rhythm elements in his score, and included two of the new themes he created for The World Is Not Enough. The first, originally used as Renard (Robert Carlyle)'s theme for the previous film, is heard during the "Antonov" cue on the recording, and is written for piano. The second new theme, most easily described as James Bond (Pierce Brosnan)'s romance theme, is heard here on the "Going Down Together" track. There is also a second romance theme in Die Another Day which was previously used on The World Is Not Enough soundtrack titled "Christmas in Turkey", and can be heard during the Miss Moneypenny (Samantha Bond)/Bond virtual sequence.

In November 2017, La-La Land Records released a limited expanded edition containing previously unreleased music.

The album received mixed to negative reviews.

== Track listing ==
1. "Die Another Day" – Performed by Madonna
2. "James Bond Theme (Bond vs. Oakenfold)" – David Arnold featuring Paul Oakenfold
3. "On the Beach"
4. "Hovercraft Chase" (Note: contains the "James Bond Theme", originally composed for the Dr. No soundtrack)
5. "Some Kind of Hero?"
6. "Welcome to Cuba"
7. "Jinx Jordan"
8. "Jinx and James"
9. "A Touch of Frost"
10. "Icarus"
11. "Laser Fight"
12. "Whiteout"
13. "Iced Inc."
14. "Antonov"
15. "Going Down Together"

=== Expanded edition ===
Disc 1

1. "On the Beach (extended version)**" (Note: contains the "James Bond Theme", originally composed for the Dr. No soundtrack) (3:56)
2. "Bond Meets Moon*/Hovercrafts*" (2:16)
3. "How Do You Intend to Kill Me Now, Mr. Bond?*" (2:02)
4. "Hovercraft Chase" (3:48)
5. "Bond to Jail*" (0:49)
6. "Some Kind of Hero?" (4:32)
7. "Kiss of Life*" (4:46)
8. "Peaceful Fountains of Desire*" (1:05)
9. "What's In it For You?*/Cuba*" (1:21)
10. "Cuban Car*" (0:50)
11. "Jinx Jordan" (1:28)
12. "Jinx & James" (2:03)
13. "Wheelchair Access*" (2:22)
14. "Jinx, James and Genes*" (5:14)
15. "Gustav Graves’ Grand Entrance*" (1:34)
16. "Blades*" (3:12)
17. "Bond Gets the Key*/Virtual Reality*" (2:01)
18. "The Vanish*/Bond Goes to Iceland*" (2:10)
19. "The Explanation*" (1:36)
20. "Icarus" (1:23)
21. "Ice Spy*"(3:00)
22. "A Touch of Frost" (1:50)
23. "Laser Fight" (4:36)
24. "It Belongs to His Boss*/Double Agent*" (2:34)
25. "Whiteout" (4:55)
26. "Bond Kidnaps Skidoo*" (2:29)
27. "Iced Inc." (3:08)
28. "Ice Palace Car Chase*" (4:57)

Disc 2

1. "Switchblades*" (3:23)
2. "Antonov" (11:51)
3. "Antonov Gets It*" (3:20)
4. "Moneypenny Gets It*" (1:11)
5. "Going Down Together" (1:32)

Additional Music

1. "On the Beach" (2:50)
2. "Hovercraft Chase (film version)**" (3:47)
3. "Some Kind of Hero? (film version)**" (4:32)
4. "Peaceful Fountains of Desire (alternate ending)*" (1:06)
5. "What's In it For You? (orchestra only)*" (0:41)
6. "Welcome to Cuba" (2:07)
7. "Jinx Jordan (orchestra only)**" (1:28)
8. "Jinx & James (film version)**" (2:07)
9. "Wheelchair Access (original version)*" (2:22)
10. "Party Trick (source)*" (1:37)
11. "A Touch of Frost (film version)**" (1:50)
12. "Laser Fight (film version)**" (4:38)
13. "Whiteout (full mix)**" (4:55)
14. "Antonov (film version)**" (11:51)
15. "James Bond Will Return*"(3:54)
  (*) Previously unreleased
  (**) Contains previously unreleased material

== In popular culture ==
- South Korean figure skater Kim Yuna used the track "Going Down Together" as part of her James Bond Medley short program for the 2009–2010 season. The James Bond Medley program was also used at the 2010 Winter Olympics in Vancouver, Canada, where Kim went on to win a gold medal.

== See also ==
- James Bond music
- Outline of James Bond

== Certifications and sales ==
Region	Certification	Certified units/sales
Brazil (Pro-Música Brasil)	Gold	50,000^{*}
United States	—	107,000
^{*} Sales figures based on certification alone.
