= List of awards and nominations received by Paul Epworth =

This is a list of awards and nominations received by British musician Paul Epworth.

== Academy Awards ==
Year	Nominated work	Award	Result	Ref.
2013	"Skyfall"	Best Original Song	Won	

== Billboard Music Awards ==
Year	Nominated work	Award	Result	Ref.
2012	"Rolling in the Deep"	Top Hot 100 Song	Nominated	
2012	"Rolling in the Deep"	Top Alternative Song	Won	
2012	"Rolling in the Deep"	Top Pop Song	Nominated	
2012	"Rolling in the Deep"	Top Radio Song	Nominated	
2012	"Rolling in the Deep"	Top Digital Song	Nominated	
2012	"Rolling in the Deep"	Top Streaming Song (Audio)	Won	
2012	"Rolling in the Deep"	Top Streaming Song (Video)	Nominated	

== BMI London Awards ==
Year	Nominated work	Award	Result	Ref.
2012	"Rolling in the Deep"	Award-Winning Songs	Won	

== BMI Pop Awards ==
Year	Nominated work	Award	Result	Ref.
2012	"Rolling In The Deep"	Award-Winning Songs	Won	

== BRIT Awards ==
Year	Nominated work	Award	Result	Ref.
2010	Himself	British Producer	Won	
2012	Himself	British Producer	Nominated	
2013	Himself	British Producer	Won	
2014	Himself	British Producer	Nominated	
2015	Himself	British Producer	Won	

== BT Digital Music Awards ==
Year	Nominated work	Award	Result
2011	"Rolling in the Deep"	Best Song	Nominated
2011	"Rolling in the Deep"	Best Video	Nominated

== Critics' Choice Movie Awards ==
Year	Nominated work	Award	Result	Ref.
2012	"Skyfall"	Best Song	Won	

== Golden Globes Awards ==
Year	Nominated work	Award	Result	Ref.
2013	"Skyfall"	Best Original Song	Won	

== Grammy Awards ==
Year	Nominated work	Award	Result	Ref.
2012	21	Album of the Year	Won	
2012	"Rolling in the Deep"	Record of the Year	Won	
2012	"Rolling in the Deep"	Song of the Year	Won	
2012	Paul Epworth	Producer of the Year, Non-Classical	Won	
2014	"Skyfall"	Best Song Written for Visual Media	Won	
2015	Paul Epworth	Producer of the Year, Non-Classical	Nominated	
2017	25	Album of the Year	Won	

== Houston Film Critics Society ==
Year	Nominated work	Award	Result	Ref.
2012	"Skyfall"	Best Original Song	Won	

== Ivor Novello Awards ==
Year	Nominated work	Award	Result	Ref.
2012	"Rolling in the Deep"	PRS for Music Most Performed Work	Won	
2012	"Rolling in the Deep"	Best Song Musically and Lyrically	Nominated	

== MTV Europe Music Awards ==
Year	Nominated work	Award	Result	Ref.
2008	Adele	Best UK/Ireland act	Nominated	
2011	"Rolling in the Deep"	Best Song	Nominated	
2011	"Rolling in the Deep"	Best Video	Nominated	

== MTV's Song of the Year ==
Year	Nominated work	Award	Result	Ref.
2011	"Rolling in the Deep"	Song of the Year	Won	

== MTV Video Music Awards ==
Year	Nominated work	Award	Result	Ref.
2011	"Rolling in the Deep"	Video of the Year	Nominated	
2011	"Rolling in the Deep"	Best Female Video	Nominated	
2011	"Rolling in the Deep"	Best Pop Video	Nominated	
2011	"Rolling in the Deep"	Best Direction	Nominated	
2011	"Rolling in the Deep"	Best Art Direction	Won	
2011	"Rolling in the Deep"	Best Cinematography	Won	
2011	"Rolling in the Deep"	Best Editing	Won	

== People's Choice Awards ==
Year	Nominated work	Award	Result	Ref.
2012	"Rolling in the Deep"	Favorite Song of the Year	Nominated	
2012	"Rolling in the Deep"	Favorite Music Video	Nominated	

== Q Awards ==
Year	Nominated work	Award	Result	Ref.
2011	"Rolling in the Deep"	Best Track	Won	

== Satellite Awards ==
Year	Nominated work	Award	Result	Ref.
2012	"Skyfall"	Best Original Song	Nominated	

== Skatta Social TV Awards ==
Year	Nominated work	Award	Result	Ref.
2013	"Skyfall"	Best Online Video	Won	
2013	"Skyfall"	Music Award	Nominated	

== Soul Train Music Awards ==
Year	Nominated work	Award	Result	Ref.
2011	"Rolling in the Deep"	Song of the Year	Nominated	
2011	"Rolling in the Deep"	Record of the Year	Nominated	

== Swiss Music Awards ==
Year	Nominated work	Award	Result	Ref.
2012	"Rolling in the Deep"	Music Award	Won	

== Teen Choice Awards ==
Year	Nominated work	Award	Result	Ref.
2011	"Rolling in the Deep"	Choice Break Up Song	Nominated	

== UK Music Video Awards ==
Year	Nominated work	Award	Result	Ref.
2011	"Rolling in the Deep"	Best Pop Video	Won	
2011	"Rolling in the Deep"	Best Cinematography in a Video	Won	
2011	"Rolling in the Deep"	Best Art Direction & Design in a Video	Nominated	

== VEVOCertified Awards ==
Year	Nominated work	Award	Result	Ref.
2012	"Rolling in the Deep"	100,000,000 Views	Won	

== World Soundtrack Academy Awards ==
Year	Nominated work	Award	Result	Ref.
2013	"Skyfall"	Best Original Song Written Directly for a Film	Won	
