= Gun barrel sequence =

James Bond signature device

The gun barrel sequence as it appears in Dr. No (1962)

The gun barrel sequence is a signature device featured in nearly every James Bond film. Shot from the point of view of a presumed assassin, it features James Bond walking in from the right side of the screen until he reaches the center, turning, and then shooting directly at the camera, causing blood to run down the screen. The visuals are usually accompanied by the "James Bond Theme", composed by Monty Norman.

Originally designed by Maurice Binder, the sequence has been featured in every James Bond film produced by Eon Productions. While it has retained the same basic elements, it has noticeably evolved throughout the series. It is one of the most immediately recognizable elements of the franchise and is featured heavily in marketing material for the films and their spin-offs.

The British media historian James Chapman suggests that the sequence is a significant part of the James Bond mythos because it "foregrounds the motif of looking, which is central to the spy genre".

== Description ==
In virtually every Eon-produced Bond film, the sequence begins with a white dot blinking across the screen, from left to right. Upon reaching the right edge of the frame, the dot opens up to reveal a rifled gun barrel's interior. From the point of view of an off-screen assassin, the camera follows James Bond as he walks from right to left against a neutral background. (Note: Casino Royale is the first film to not follow this.) Suddenly he becomes aware of being observed and stops at the centre of the screen before he quickly turns to the camera and shoots his gun towards it. A red blood wash, representing the gunman bleeding, runs down the screen. (Note: No Time to Die is the first film featuring no blood wash in the gun barrel.)

With a few exceptions, the gun barrel either moves from side-to-side across the screen (towards the end of the blood washing) then dissolves to a white dot, which typically settles in the corner, (Note: White dots that do not settle in the corner are seen in Thunderball, On Her Majesty's Secret Service, Licence to Kill, and The World Is Not Enough.) or simply fades to black. (Note: Skyfall and Spectre) If the gun barrel dissolves to the white dot, it either segues to the title sequence, (Note: Dr. No and Casino Royale (albeit directly after the blood wash)) shrinks and disappears, (Note: Dr. No, From Russia with Love and Goldfinger) or fades from white to a circular cutout of the first scene, expanding to reveal the full view of the scene shortly thereafter. (Note: Most Eon-produced Bond films follow this ending, for this is seen in gun barrels featuring all Eon's actors who have played Bond: Connery (non-Simmons variant), Lazenby, Moore (both variants, though the cutout in For Your Eyes Only cuts into the full view of scene instead of zooming in), Dalton, Brosnan, and Craig (No Time to Die only, wherein it happens directly in the gun barrel without it dissolving to the white dot.))

== Origins ==
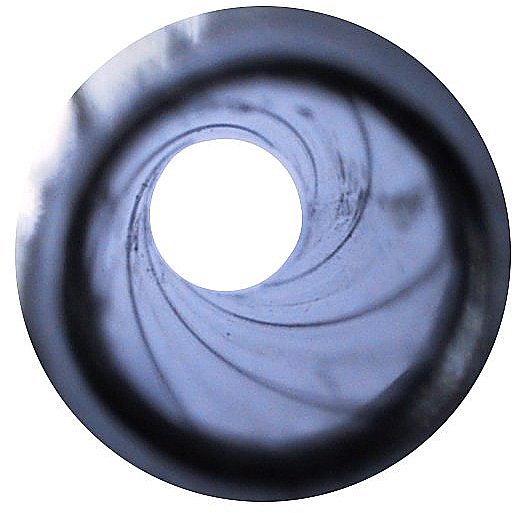
A .38 calibre gun barrel with its six-sided rifling, similar to the gun barrel shown in the movies

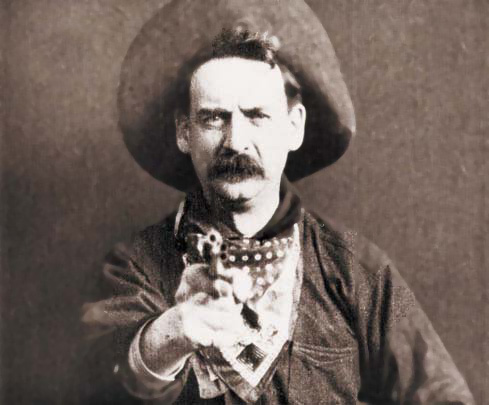
The 1903 film The Great Train Robbery, acted out by Justus D. Barnes, may have influenced the James Bond gun barrel sequence.

Maurice Binder created the opening titles of the first Bond film, Dr. No, in 1962. Binder originally planned to employ a camera sighted down the barrel of a .38 calibre gun, but this caused some problems. Unable to stop down the lens of a standard camera enough to bring the entire gun barrel into focus, Binder created a pinhole camera to solve the problem, and the barrel became crystal clear.

Binder described the genesis of the gun barrel sequence in the last interview he recorded before his death in 1991:

That was something I did in a hurry, because I had to get to a meeting with the producers in twenty minutes. I just happened to have little white, price tag stickers and I thought I'd use them as gun shots across the screen. We'd have James Bond walk through and fire, at which point blood comes down onscreen. That was about a twenty-minute storyboard I did, and they said, "This looks great!"

The media historian James Chapman observed that the sequence recalls the gun fired at the audience at the end of The Great Train Robbery (1903).

== Evolution of the sequence ==
=== Bob Simmons ===
==== 1962–1964 ====
Because Binder had designed the gun barrel sequence to feature Bond only in silhouette, with a non-widescreen aspect ratio, he used stunt man Bob Simmons, rather than Sean Connery, to film the scene.

Simmons hops slightly as he pivots to assume the firing position and, following the blood wash, the dot becomes smaller and jumps to the lower right-hand corner of the frame before simply vanishing.

In Dr. No, the white dot stops mid-screen and the credit line "Harry Saltzman & Albert R. Broccoli present" appears across the dot. The text is wiped and the dot continues the sequence. The sequence is accompanied by a soundtrack of electronic noises and then numerous notes that sound like they are being plinked from a wind-up jack in the box; the latter is cut short by the gunshot. The "James Bond Theme" then plays very loudly, albeit with the first portion, featuring the theme's plucked electric guitar riff, truncated. The gun barrel sequence in Dr. No segues directly into the credits, a grid matrix of large-scale, bright and rapidly changing coloured circular dots against a black background. This version, without the electronic noises or the Saltzman–Broccoli credit line, was also used in From Russia with Love with more red-coloured blood and Goldfinger which fades into the pre-credit sequence.

=== Sean Connery ===
==== 1965–1967 ====
For Thunderball, the aspect ratio of the films was changed to a Panavision anamorphic format and so the gun barrel sequence had to be reshot, this time with Sean Connery in the role. It is also the first gun barrel sequence in which the white dot segues to the film's pre-credit sequence, opening up to reveal the entirety of the scene. This is also the gun barrel which moves the least amount of seconds, for the point of Bond's final stance and the opening shot (the fake coffin of SPECTRE's Colonel Jacques Bouvar) almost completely overlap each other.

Connery wobbles slightly while firing his gun as he adjusts his balance from an unstable position and he bends over to fire. Although the sequence was shot in colour for Thunderball, it is rendered in black and white for You Only Live Twice.

=== 1969 (George Lazenby) ===
With a new actor, George Lazenby, in the role of James Bond for On Her Majesty's Secret Service (1969), a third sequence had to be filmed. As with Thunderball, the sequence was once again shot in colour.

In this rendering, the white dot stops mid-screen and the credit line "Harry Saltzman and Albert R. Broccoli Present" appears, much as it did in Dr. No (albeit spelling out "and" instead of using the ampersand). The "James Bond Theme" keeps playing though. As the barrel begins to move and when it stops centre-screen, Bond is walking to position for around a second before turning and shooting as the camera tracks with him, resulting in a "treadmill" effect. Lazenby is the only Bond who kneels down to fire; this is also the only version where the descending blood completely erases Bond's image, leaving only the red circle. In this version, the gun barrel is awash with prismatic splashes of light.

=== 1971 (Sean Connery) ===
When Sean Connery returned to the role of Bond for Diamonds Are Forever (1971), the gun barrel sequence filmed for Thunderball was used. As with You Only Live Twice, the sequence was rendered in black and white, but was given a bluish tint. As in On Her Majesty's Secret Service, the barrel is awash with prismatic splashes of light, which this time ripple through it. Unlike On Her Majesty's Secret Service, the splashes of light are erased by the descending blood. This was the last time the sequence was rendered in black and white until Casino Royale (2006). It is also the last gun barrel sequence in which Bond wears a hat.

=== Roger Moore ===
==== 1973–1974 ====
With the introduction of Roger Moore, and the use of a 1.85:1 matted aspect ratio, a fourth sequence was shot. It was used for just two films: Live and Let Die and The Man with the Golden Gun. Moore wears a business suit and, unlike Simmons, Connery, and Lazenby, uses both hands instead of one hand to fire his gun, his left hand bracing his gun arm. The gun barrel only moves side-to-side to the left of Bond, without alternating to the right. This is the first gun barrel sequence in which Bond is not wearing a hat. Additional footage of this sequence was shot of Bond shooting with both hands, then walking straight towards the camera with his gun drawn, putting his face into view, as seen in theatrical trailers from Live and Let Die through The Spy Who Loved Me. The dots that start the gun barrel in The Man with the Golden Gun are blue but in subsequent releases the dots are white. It is the last gun barrel sequence until Quantum of Solace where Bond wears a business suit.

==== 1977–1985 ====
The anamorphic format was reinstated for The Spy Who Loved Me, necessitating a fifth version of the sequence. Moore's Bond wears a dinner suit (tuxedo) rather than a business suit and again uses both hands to fire his gun. This rendering would feature in all Moore's subsequent films in the series, for a total of five appearances, the most uses of the same footage to date. In this version of the sequence, it is noticeable that the background of this version of the sequence is tinted, rather than the usual white. The tint changes with every Moore film. The Spy Who Loved Me, for example, features an eggshell tinted background whereas the background in Moonraker has a strong shade of buff. In For Your Eyes Only, once the white dot moves in the middle of the screen, it does not open up to reveal the pre-credits scene, but cuts abruptly. The gun barrel sequence for Moore's final film, A View to a Kill, featured an error in the 2006 Ultimate Edition and subsequent DVD releases of the film. The error was a scanning issue which caused the gun barrel to be cropped off largely along with the opening dots going off of the screen, just like the Brosnan gun barrels. The issue was rectified in one of the latest iTunes releases.

=== Timothy Dalton ===
==== 1987–1989 ====
A new gun barrel sequence was shot due to the change in actor from Roger Moore to Timothy Dalton and was used for both of Dalton's films. Dalton walks swiftly with a slight bounce before sharply spinning and firing. Dalton crouches down slightly when he fires. Unlike Moore, Dalton shoots one-handed. John Barry orchestrates the music for the gun barrel in The Living Daylights (1987) but Michael Kamen composes a different orchestration for Licence to Kill (1989). This was the last gun barrel sequence to be designed by Maurice Binder before his death in 1991. The Licence to Kill gun barrel alters the gun barrel of the previous film slightly, showing Dalton's walk and pose as more zoomed in.

An alternate gun barrel sequence appears in The Living Daylights trailer, showing Dalton hopping as he fires, similar to Bob Simmons.

=== Pierce Brosnan ===
==== 1995–2002 ====
Following Maurice Binder's death in 1991, Daniel Kleinman became the designer of the Bond opening graphics. Beginning with GoldenEye (1995), the barrel was computer-generated (but still resembles the original images of the barrel itself) emphasising light and shade variations in the rifling spiral as the reflected light shifts with the gun's movement. Like Dalton, Pierce Brosnan shoots one-handed. Unlike the previous Bonds, he remains bolt upright as he fires, with his gun arm extended straight at the camera. The blood in this sequence is noticeably darker and falls faster than in previous incarnations; in keeping with this new pace, the main melody line of the "James Bond Theme" is omitted in two of Brosnan's gun barrel sequences, Tomorrow Never Dies and The World Is Not Enough. In prior versions of the sequence, the white dot would open up to reveal the gun barrel before it reaches the right edge of the screen; in all four of Brosnan's films, however, the dot continues moving right until it disappears off screen. Then the gun barrel scrolls in leftward from off screen. The World Is Not Enough is the first Bond movie where the white dot opens up to reveal Bond, this gun barrel also shows Bond's final pose as uncentered, possibly due to a scanning error.

The teaser trailer for GoldenEye featured its own gun barrel sequence in which Bond, appearing in shadow, quickly shoots away six times the onscreen text "ON ONE MAN", before shooting his seventh shot on the letter "M" into a "7" to only leave "007". Bond walks into the foreground, revealing Brosnan's face and proclaiming "You were expecting someone else?", introducing him as the first actor to play Bond since 1989.

The theatrical trailer for Tomorrow Never Dies featured its own gun barrel sequence in which Bond, in a dinner suit, fires with both hands à la Roger Moore at the six-grooved gun barrel.

In Die Another Day (2002), Lee Tamahori, the film's director requested a CG bullet be added into the sequence, which is seen zooming from Bond's gun at the screen and disappearing, suggesting that Bond has fired straight into his opponent's weapon. This was the last gun barrel sequence until No Time to Die where Bond wears a dinner suit and the last one until Spectre where the sequence opens the film.

=== Daniel Craig ===
Daniel Craig in Casino Royale

==== 2006 ====
The gun barrel sequence was revised again for Daniel Craig's first portrayal of Agent 007 in Casino Royale. Unlike previous instalments, the gun barrel sequence does not open the film as a standalone segment; it is part of the plot. Having seemingly committed the first kill on his way to becoming a Double-O agent, Bond stops to pick up his gun from the floor but his victim, Fisher, who is a henchman of rogue MI6 section chief Dryden, recovers and seizes his own weapon. As Fisher brings his pistol up to shoot Bond in the back, the frame shifts instantly to the gun barrel perspective; Bond spins around to outshoot his opponent.

This sequence differs considerably from previous versions: it is incorporated into the film's narrative; it begins with Bond standing stationary (although he was walking toward the door before stopping and turning); it is not filmed against a blank white void and it includes the person whom Bond shoots. In keeping with the black-and-white theme of the pre-title sequence of the film, it is also the first to be presented in monochrome since Diamonds Are Forever (1971) and the first in which Bond is wearing neither a business suit nor a dinner suit, but is dressed casually. Like Dalton and Brosnan, Craig shoots one-handed.

Furthermore, the computer-generated rifling is microgroove rather than the traditional eight rifling grooves, and the blood comes down the screen quickly, not in a wave, but in rivulets. As the blood falls, the frames zooms back out, leading to the opening titles. This is also the first gun barrel sequence without some variation of the "James Bond Theme" as, instead, it is accompanied by the opening bars of the film's theme song, "You Know My Name".

==== 2008 ====
The gun barrel was refilmed and edited for 2008's Quantum of Solace. It reverts to a more traditional style, although the sequence was placed at the end of the film to start the closing credits, due to a final cliffhanger scene being cut by Marc Forster. The sequence represents Bond as a blunt and cold-blooded assassin due to the pace of the scene. For example, the white dot travels across the screen much faster than in previous gun barrel sequences, Daniel Craig moves swiftly into position, noticeably faster than its predecessors, and the blood comes down in a large quick wash. Like Dalton and Brosnan, Craig shoots one-handed. The design of the gun barrel is also more simplistic, with a grey colour to it as well as fewer and more widely spaced grooves. The white circle also spins into the centre of the Q in the title graphic for Quantum of Solace, and in the Q, Bond is shown walking away after firing for the first time in the sequence. The closing credits of the film follow.

==== 2012 ====
Yet another redesigned gun barrel is used for the film Skyfall (2012). Although director Sam Mendes had originally intended to place the gun barrel at the start of the film, he felt that it would be better placed at the end, as in Quantum of Solace. The film's opening shot instead harks back to the gun barrel, with Bond emerging into a corridor, pointing his gun directly at the camera, accompanied by the first two notes of the "James Bond Theme". Mendes recalled, "I tried very hard to put the gun barrel at the beginning and my intention was always to do that. If you see the film, the film starts with Bond walking down a corridor towards camera and lifting a gun. And of course the gun barrel is him walking, stopping and lifting a gun. When I put the two together, it looked ridiculous!"

Like with Quantum of Solace, the blood is dark red and runs down the frame in rivulets. However, Bond moves across the screen substantially slower (at a similar speed to the pre-Casino Royale sequences). Unlike all previous gun barrel openings, Craig swings both his arms as he walks, resulting in a partial glimpse of his gun before he turns to fire. After the blood runs down the frame, the screen fades to black, before being replaced by a title card with a small gun barrel logo celebrating fifty years of Bond films and the text "James Bond Will Return" underneath. Craig shoots one-handed from the chest.

==== 2015 ====
The gun barrel is placed at the immediate opening of Spectre, the first time since Die Another Day that a Bond film has opened with the gun barrel. The gun barrel design is reminiscent of the 2D-style gun barrels designed by Maurice Binder pre-1995, although slightly blurrier, it also resembles the Pierce Brosnan era gun barrels. Daniel Craig moves at an average speed (again swinging both of his arms as he walks, but this time resulting in his gun being made much more prominently visible), before spinning, facing the camera and firing, to which the lighting grows darker: it silhouettes Bond's figure and the blood runs down the screen, looking similar but noticeably slower than in Quantum of Solace and Skyfall. Craig shoots one-handed again from the chest.

==== 2021 ====
Daniel Craig in No Time to Die

The gun barrel appears at the opening of No Time to Die, the final Bond film to feature Daniel Craig. In the International release, the gun barrel begins from the center screen after its transition from the Universal Pictures logo where it moves offscreen to the left before reverting to its traditional dot blinking sequence from left to right. This is omitted from the US release as it starts with the traditional dot blinking sequence. The gun barrel uses the glimmer effect for the first time since 1971, with the design being simpler, similar to that of Quantum of Solace. Craig this time swings his left arm instead of both, with a partial glimpse of his gun, while also walking near the same pace as in Quantum of Solace. After spinning around to the camera, he shoots the gun from his right breastbone, arching slightly to his right. There is no visible muzzle flash from Bond's gun, and the sequence omits the running blood for the very first time fading to white (possibly foreshadowing Bond's death), and instead zooms into the first scene through the middle. This is also the first gun barrel sequence since Die Another Day where Bond is wearing a dinner suit.

== Costume ==
From Dr. No to Diamonds Are Forever, the gun barrel sequences by Bob Simmons, Sean Connery, and George Lazenby feature James Bond in a business suit and trilby. For his first two films, Roger Moore's Bond continues this tradition but without the hat. The following films, from The Spy Who Loved Me (1977) through Die Another Day (2002), feature Bond in black tie, wearing a dinner suit (tuxedo). In Casino Royale, Daniel Craig's James Bond is the first shown wearing a more casual ensemble and an open-necked shirt; his attire reverts to a business suit in Quantum of Solace, which is retained for Skyfall and Spectre. The 007 Legends video game tie-in reverts to the dinner suit. No Time To Die has Bond in a dinner suit.

== Music ==
The gun barrel sequence is traditionally accompanied by an arrangement of the "James Bond Theme", a trademark established in Dr. No.

A slightly different version of the theme has been used in each film, often reflecting the styles and locations featured. Some composers have not used the familiar opening bars that punctuate the appearance of the white dots. Others, while retaining them, have felt free to noticeably alter the usual rendition, e.g. Michael Kamen and Éric Serra, who scored Licence to Kill and GoldenEye respectively. Kamen's orchestration was a symphonic fanfare, while Serra's arrangement is played by synthesiser.

Casino Royale has the only gun barrel sequence which omits the "James Bond Theme" completely, instead featuring the opening bars of "You Know My Name" by Chris Cornell. The "James Bond Theme" returns to accompany the gun barrel sequence in Quantum of Solace, where it continues into the credits. The same goes with Skyfall's gun barrel, though the theme starts before the sequence in the last scene of the film when the new M gives 007 the dossier for his next mission.

== Other uses ==
The gun barrel sequence is widely used in advertisements and merchandise. References to its circular motif regularly appear in the films' trailers. A version of the sequence is used at the start of the 2012 documentary Everything or Nothing: The Untold Story of 007 which showed each Bond composited together, turning and shooting.

The music videos to the James Bond title themes "A View to a Kill", "The Living Daylights", "Licence to Kill", "GoldenEye", "Tomorrow Never Dies", "Die Another Day" and "Another Way to Die" each feature their own variation of the gun barrel sequence.

The 007 sequence in Never Say Never Again

As the gun barrel sequence is copyrighted by Eon, the non-Eon Bond film Never Say Never Again, released by rival Warner Bros., instead employed a frame filled with 007's, with the camera zooming into the one in the middle of the screen. There is, however, a scene in which James Bond and Maximilian Largo play a video game together. The nuclear missile defense shield used in the game resembles a gun barrel.

== Video games ==
The sequence is commonly used in James Bond video games and their marketing. GoldenEye 007 for the Nintendo 64 uses the gun barrel sequence in the opening titles. A commercial for The World Is Not Enough parodied the gun barrel by replacing Bond with a man who resembled Valentin Zukovsky; he was shot at with a machine-gun before diving off-screen. It was used in a commercial for the video game Agent Under Fire asking, "Do you have what it takes to be Bond?", and showing people trying to repeat the shot, but spoiling the try. Nightfire and Everything or Nothing each use a version similar to the Pierce Brosnan films. From Russia with Love uses the Bob Simmons gun barrel from the film of the same name. In the video game adaptation of Quantum of Solace, the gun barrel resembles the one used for Casino Royale, as the game adapts elements from both films. The 2010 video game Blood Stone does not feature the gun barrel sequence in-game, but an unused animation of it (strongly resembling the Quantum of Solace film version) is viewable in the PC port's game files. Instead, the game has gun barrel motifs in its "focus aim" system and briefly in early trailers. Both versions of the GoldenEye remakes, GoldenEye 007 (2010) for the Wii and its PS3/Xbox counterpart GoldenEye: Reloaded (2011), have no gun barrel featured at all save for the box art and a brief reference in the opening titles. 2012's 007 Legends opens with the gun barrel as the start screen, with a design somewhat akin to that of Skyfall. The 2026 video game First Light uses an original gun barrel but without Bond in the opening for the first time. Instead, the camera zooms and showing of a helicopter flying toward its destination. The gun barrel later appeared with Bond at the end of the game. It also featured from the game's early marketing, both the teaser image and trailer.

== Parodies ==
The gun barrel sequence has inspired numerous parodies and takeoffs since its first appearance in 1962. The sequence has been spoofed in films, sitcoms, cartoons and in advertisements, including: Bons Baisers de Hong Kong, Dave Allen at Large, Teen Titans Go!, The Simpsons, SpongeBob SquarePants, Family Guy, American Dad!, Monty Python's Flying Circus, Logorama, Garfield and Friends, Yogi's Treasure Hunt, Ozzy & Drix and My Little Pony: Friendship Is Magic. WWE wrestler Cesaro's entrance was also similar at one point to that of the James Bond gun barrel sequence.

In the 1986 horror/slasher film Friday the 13th Part VI: Jason Lives, the opening credits show Jason Voorhees, the main antagonist in the series, emulating the gun barrel sequence by walking across the screen in a Bond-like fashion and then turning to face the camera whilst swinging his signature machete, drenching the screen with blood in a similar manner to the original Bond sequences.

In 2021, MI6, which has historically distanced itself from the Bond franchise, released the image of its annual Christmas Card, which that year featured Father Christmas posing with a candy cane against a backdrop reminiscent of the Bond movies' gun barrel sequence.

== See also ==
- Outline of James Bond
