= Songbook (musical) =

- Music: Monty Norman
- Lyrics: Monty Norman, Julian More
- Book: Monty Norman, Julian More
- Productions: 1979 London; 1979 Wisbech; 1981 Broadway
- Awards: Olivier Award (Best New Musical 1979); Ivor Novello Award

Songbook (New York title The Moony Shapiro Songbook) is a musical with music by Monty Norman and book and lyrics by Monty Norman and Julian More. The musical tells the improbable life story of a fictional songwriter, born in Liverpool in 1908, who has a colourful career with extraordinary successes and setbacks, loves and losses, and brushes with celebrities and historic events; he dies celebrated.

It premiered at the Gielgud Theatre in London on 25 July 1979, where it ran for 208 performances.

== Synopsis ==
Through a series of witty pastiches, the musical tells the life story of a fictional songwriter, Mooney Shapiro, born Liverpool 1908, who emigrates to New York's Lower East Side, before finding Broadway and Hollywood success (cue Gershwin and deSylva/Brown/Henderson spoofs), marrying a Swedish film star and writing for early Busby Berkeley film musicals. Mooney flees the Depression for Europe, where he joins the expat Paris scene (cue Piaf spoof) and falls for an English aristocrat, whose sister is a close friend of Hitler (cue Berlin Olympics 1936). Returning to the US, Mooney scores an Andrews Sisters style hit, then returns to write patriotic numbers for Blitz-ed London (cue Cicely Courtneidge & Marlene Dietrich spoofs). After WW2, Mooney is back in the USA writing returning-GI hits (cue Como/Sinatra spoof) and hoe-down, mid-West feelgood Broadway musical before falling foul of McCarthyism. This brings him back to his native Liverpool (1960) where (surprise, surprise) he writes for a new pop group and a new generation (cue Beatles spoof)! The Swinging Sixties come and go, leaving Mooney stranded again, losing wife and lover, a teenage singer, who conquers the charts with an old Shapiro number reworked as a disco hit. Back on top again, the aged Mooney dies, rich in honours, with a parting song 'Nostalgia'. half-celebrating, half-mocking his long songwriting career.

== Song list ==
- "Songbook"
- "East River Rhapsody"
- "Talking Picture Show"
- "Mister Destiny"
- "Your Time is Different to Mine"
- "Pretty Face"
- "Je Vous Aime Milady"
- "Les Halles"
- "Olympics Song (1936)"
- "Nazi Party Pooper"
- "I'm Gonna Take Him Home to Momma"
- "Bumpity Bump"
- "The Girl In the Window / Victory V"
- "April in Wisconsin"
- "Vocal Gems from musical Happy Hickory: a) Happy Hickory b) Lovely Sunday Mornin' c) Rusty's Dream Ballet d) A Storm In My Heart e) The Pokenhatchit Public Protest Committee f) Happy Hickory (reprise)"
- "I Accuse"
- "Messages"
- "I Found Love"
- "Don't Play That Love Song Any More"
- "Golden Oldie"
- "I found Love"
- "Climbin'
- "Nostalgia"

== Productions ==
It premiered at the Gielgud Theatre (then called "Globe Theatre"), in London on 25 July 1979 and ran for 208 performances. The production was directed by Jonathan Lynn with musical staging by Gillian Lynne. On 23 September 1979 the cast performed for one night at the Georgian Angles Theatre, Wisbech, Isle of Ely, relocating from the Gielgud Theatre for the single performance. This event was arranged by cast member and president of the Angles Theatre Anton Rodgers.

The musical opened on Broadway at the Morosco Theatre on 3 May 1981 and closed after the 1 performance and 15 previews. Helmed again by Jonathan Lynn with musical staging by George Faison, the musical featured Gary Beach, Jeff Goldblum, Judy Kaye and Timothy Jerome as "Mooney Shapiro". All of the cast members played several characters, one of which was their real-life name. The musical received a Tony Award nomination for Best Book of a Musical.

== Reception ==
Songbook received the Olivier Award for the Best New Musical in 1979. In his review for The New York Times, Frank Rich wrote that "There's the germ of a funny, spiffy satirical revue in The Moony Shapiro Songbook, the forlorn little musical at the Morosco."
