= Skyfall (song) =

2012 single by Adele

Single by Adele

from the album Skyfall: Original Motion Picture Soundtrack
- Released: 5 October 2012
- Recorded: 2012
- Studio: Abbey Road, London
- Genre: Orchestral pop; pop-soul
- Length: 4:46
- Label: XL; Columbia; Melted Stone
- Songwriters: Adele Adkins; Paul Epworth
- Producer: Paul Epworth

Adele singles chronology
| "Turning Tables" (2011) | "Skyfall" (2012) | "Hello" (2015) |

James Bond theme singles chronology
| "Another Way to Die" (2008) | "Skyfall" (2012) | "Writing's on the Wall" (2015) |

Lyric video
- "Skyfall" on YouTube

"Skyfall" is a song recorded by the English singer Adele for the James Bond film of the same name. She co-wrote the song with its producer Paul Epworth, and it features orchestration from J. A. C. Redford. Eon Productions invited the singer to work on the theme song in early 2011, a task that Adele accepted after reading the film's script. While composing the song, Adele and Epworth aimed to capture the mood and style of the other Bond themes, including dark and moody lyrics descriptive of the film's plot. "Skyfall" was released at 0:07 British Summer Time (BST) on 5 October 2012 as part of the Global James Bond Day, celebrating the 50th anniversary of the release of Dr. No, the first James Bond film.

"Skyfall" was praised for its lyrics, production and Adele's vocal performance, with numerous music critics and publications ranking it among the best Bond themes. The song charted at number one in Belgium, France, Germany, Hungary, Ireland, Lebanon, the Netherlands, and South Korea while obtaining a diamond certification from Brazil and multi-platinum certifications in Canada, Italy, Mexico, New Zealand, and the United Kingdom. With sales of 7.2 million copies worldwide, "Skyfall" is one of the best-selling digital singles of all time.

"Skyfall" received various accolades, including the Academy Award for Best Original Song, Brit Award for British Single, Critics' Choice Movie Award for Best Song, Golden Globe Award for Best Original Song, and the Grammy Award for Best Song Written for Visual Media, thus making it the first Bond theme to win all the aforementioned awards. During the 85th Academy Awards, Adele performed the song live for the first time.

== Background and production ==
In early 2011, Sony Pictures President of Music Lia Vollack suggested to the James Bond film producers at Eon Productions that they ask Adele to record a theme song for their next Bond film, later revealed to be titled Skyfall. Vollack thought that Adele would be a good choice to ask to record a Bond theme song because her music had a "soulful, haunting, evocative quality", which Vollack considered would bring back the "classic Shirley Bassey feel" associated with several early Bond films.

Adele, who had just released her second studio album, 21, admitted that initially she was a "little hesitant" about agreeing to write a Bond theme song. On meeting with the Skyfall film crew, the singer had told the film's director, Sam Mendes, that she felt as though she was not the person they were looking for because "my songs are personal, I write from the heart". Mendes simply replied "just write a personal song", telling her to use Carly Simon's "Nobody Does It Better" from The Spy Who Loved Me as an inspiration. Adele left the meeting with the script of Skyfall and upon reading it, decided that it was a "no-brainer", as she "fell in love" with the film's plot. Producer Paul Epworth, who had worked with Adele on 21, was brought in to help her write the song. Adele stated that she enjoyed working to a brief and set of guidelines, even though it was something she had never done before.

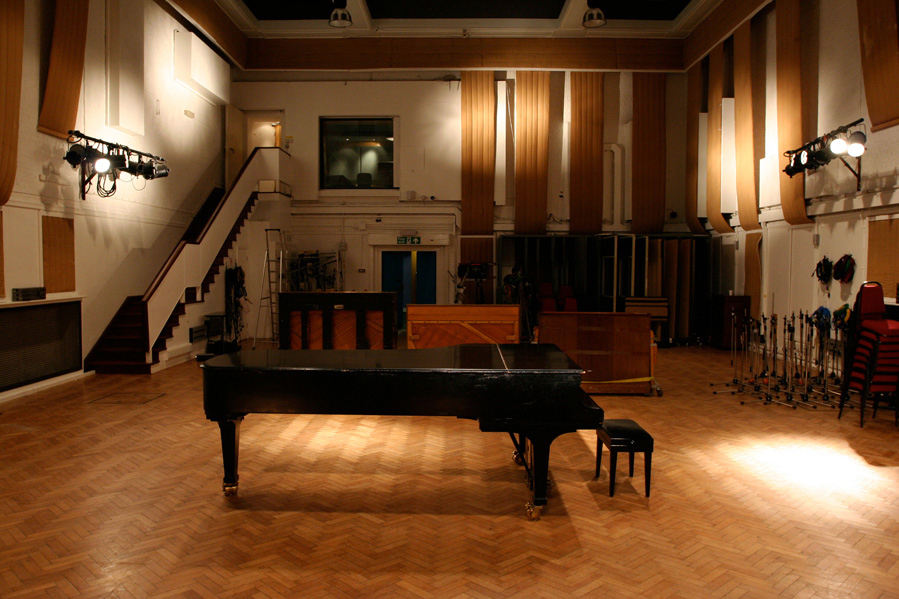
Abbey Road Studios, where "Skyfall" was recorded.

Production of "Skyfall", from the first contact with Adele to the song's release, took 18 months to complete. Vollack stated that the reason for this was "fine-tuning" the song, as Adele and Epworth wanted to ensure that they "were getting it right". The first cut of the song was completed in October 2011. During an interview at their post-Academy Award for Best Original Song win at the 85th Academy Awards in February 2013, Adele revealed that the first draft of the song was written in 10 minutes. After Adele underwent throat microsurgery for vocal problems, she recorded a demo of the track and sent it to Mendes, who was doing the principal photography of Skyfall. The director in turn played the demo for film producer Barbara Broccoli and James Bond actor Daniel Craig, both of whom "shed a tear". Adele stated that the final cut of the song lasted two studio sessions at Abbey Road Studios in London. It features a 77-piece orchestra conducted by J. A. C. Redford.

== Composition and lyrics ==
"Skyfall"
A 28-second sample of "Skyfall" containing the bridge and the chorus, which features the orchestra.

"Skyfall" is an orchestral pop and pop-soul song with a duration of four minutes and 46 seconds. Epworth stated that although "Skyfall" is an original composition, he and Adele had worked to capture "the James Bond feeling" of previous theme songs. The song intentionally references Monty Norman's "James Bond Theme" after the first chorus. Norman said that the song had his seal of approval and that including the leitmotif he wrote for the Bond character was "a pretty sensible thing to do, if you want to feel the 'James Bond quality' of the music". Epworth said that while "Skyfall" was his first experience writing film music, he had been involved with the production of James Bond music before: while Epworth was a tape operator at AIR Studios, he recorded some film soundtracks including David Arnold's Tomorrow Never Dies.

Epworth stated that the producers' request was for "a dramatic ballad", so he and Adele tried to "do something that was simultaneously dark and final, like a funeral, and to try and turn it into something that was not final. A sense of death and rebirth". Epworth watched the first thirteen Bond films seeking the "musical code" of the songs, "whatever the modal structure or the chord that always seemed to unify those songs" and contributed to the mood and "that kind of '60s jazzy quality". Epworth identified as a uniting factor "a minor ninth as the harmonic code ... the Bond songs, they have that elaboration to it" and wrote what would become the instrumental part of "Skyfall". He described it as "a bit of a 'Eureka!' moment".

The chordal structure of the chorus of "Skyfall" was originally composed by American artist Matthew Shelly, as part of a prog-rock composition entitled "Failing Grace", a track from the album Pain, released in 1991. "Skyfall" was composed in the key of C minor using common time at 75 beats per minute (Adagietto). Adele's vocal range spans over one octave, from the low note of G_{3} to the high note of C_{5}, on the song. Heavily pregnant at the time of recording, Adele has commented that this was the reason for the song's low range, and has often struggled to perform the song live due to the lower register. The lyrics closely follow the plot of the film rather than focusing on romanticism. According to Epworth, the song is about "death and rebirth", saying "It's like, when the world ends and everything comes down around your ears, if you've got each other's back, you can conquer anything. From death to triumph, that was definitely something we set out to try and capture". The Daily Telegraph writer Neil McCormick described the lyrics as "slightly sinister" and containing references to a number of Bond tropes and motifs.

== Release and remixes ==
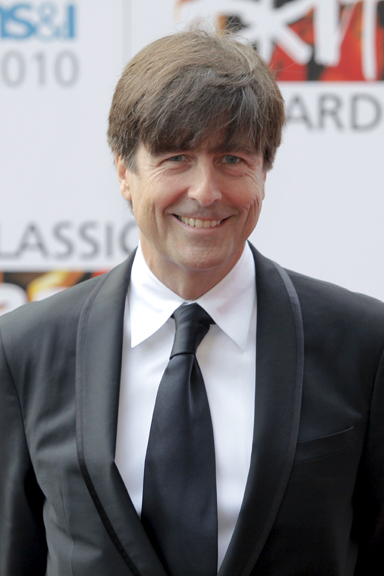
Thomas Newman composed Skyfall's musical score. A portion of "Skyfall" was included in the track "Komodo Dragon" as an interpolation due to not being included on the soundtrack album.

The theme song, and the identity of its singer, was kept secret, but rumours of Adele's involvement still emerged. Adele first mentioned recording a "special project" in September 2011 in an interview on The Jonathan Ross Show, leading to speculation in the media that she was recording a Bond theme. In an interview with NRJ in April 2012, the singer stated that she intended to release a new single by the end of the year; however, it would not be preceding a new album. The song's title was originally rumoured to be "Let the Sky Fall". In September 2012, OneRepublic vocalist Ryan Tedder posted a message on Twitter claiming he had heard the track and that it was "the best James Bond theme in his lifetime". Adele's publicist, Paul Moss, mentioned the song on his Twitter feed; both later deleted their messages. The artwork for the song was leaked online, but Adele's involvement in the project was not officially confirmed until 1 October. "Skyfall" was released at 0:07 BST on 5 October 2012 as part of the "Global James Bond Day", celebrating the 50th anniversary of the release of Dr. No, the first James Bond film. A 12-inch single featuring unofficial remixes of the song was sold in Germany to promote the song.

The song was not included on the soundtrack album, marking the second time in the Bond series that the theme song was split from the soundtrack album, following Chris Cornell's "You Know My Name" from Casino Royale in 2006. Wilson and Broccoli still asked composer Thomas Newman to include a reference to "Skyfall" in the film's score "so that it didn't appear as a kind of 'one off' at the top of the movie". Newman opted to include an interpolation in the track "Komodo Dragon", used in a scene where Bond enters a casino in Macau. According to Newman, the scene had "a real moment of 'Bond' swagger", and the music fit the scene accordingly. Epworth was visited by Newman for advice, and Redford, who was already doing the score's orchestration, was requested to arrange "Komodo Dragon"; Newman was unable to do the arrangement because he felt that his task "was already so huge and daunting".

== Critical reception ==
"Skyfall" received widespread critical acclaim. Entertainment Weekly wrote that there is "finally" a great James Bond theme. The Huffington Post described the song as a "brassy and soulful tune [that] fits perfectly alongside the work of Shirley Bassey in the oeuvre of James Bond title tracks". RedEye gave the song four out of four stars and declared that it "is a return to form, and if it doesn't get you hyped for the movie, you're not a Bond fan". The Daily Record named "Skyfall" its "Single of the Week" and gave the song five stars out of five. PopCrush gave the song four-and-a-half stars out of five and called it "wholly satisfying and worth the wait". Idolator wrote that "during the song's final third, Adele does, in fact, make the sky fall, in typical Adele fashion". Consequence of Sound commented that "rousing instrumentation elevates the vocals to soaring heights", while HitFix called the song a "majestic ballad" and a "classic James Bond theme". Newsday was also very positive, writing that "Skyfall" is "unlike anything else she's done in her young career. It's self-assured and grand, drawing inspiration from Dame Shirley Bassey, while adding her own powerful phrasing to make it her own. Adele's style so far has been to downplay her massive voice with lyrics that are questioning and self-deprecating. On 'Skyfall,' though, it sounds like the diva point of view suits her, too".

The Los Angeles Times complimented the song and said that the song "tells good things for this winter's blockbuster-to-be. It's not a reimagining or a musical departure, but simply a righting of the ship. The song is big, bold and seems to have a little spot-o-fun". MTV was also positive, stating that "Adele's lush song fits right in with classics by Shirley Bassey, Paul McCartney and Carly Simon". The Wall Street Journal felt similarly, writing that the song "has sweep and drama, [with] orchestral support [that] gives it a classical timelessness that sets it apart from typical pop songs. Because it is a theme for a Bond film, after all, the song is also shot through with the threat of violence and death". E! Online wrote that Adele's song was "a cross, and a good one at that, between the 1971 Bassey classic and a more-focused version of Garbage's 'The World Is Not Enough'." The Hollywood Reporter wrote that the song "instantly feels like a Bond theme, with the singer's sultry voice set against a minor chord progression. Done in big, orchestral style, the mood – like the singer – is all 1960s throwback, back when Bond themes like 'Goldfinger' were smooth, seductive and larger than life".

Jim Farber of the New York-based Daily News wrote in his review: "It suffers from a similarly meandering melody and ponderous progression. The grandeur of its arrangement easily upstages the tune", but "even so, the luster of Adele's tone, and the bravura arc of her vocal, makes it enjoyable enough. And, fifty years down the line, isn't that all we really expect from a Bond product these days?" Yahoo!'s Rob O'Connor gave the standalone song a positive review but felt that it was too soon to tell how the song would fit into the wider canon of Bond theme songs. Neil McCormick of the Daily Telegraph was less complimentary, describing the song as "classy" but at the same time, "overly predictable".

== Chart performance ==
"Skyfall" went to number one at the UK's iTunes online store less than ten hours after it was released, surpassing "Diamonds" by Rihanna. At 6 am on 5 October, Clear Channel began airing "Skyfall" on 180 radio stations around the United States every hour, on the hour; within 24 hours, "Skyfall" had garnered 10 million audience impressions and had already begun to rank within the top 50 of the Nielsen Broadcast Data Systems-based Radio Songs chart. On 7 October, "Skyfall" entered the UK Singles Chart at number 4 after less than 48 hours on sale. The single sold 84,000 copies in the UK during its first two days of release. On 14 October, "Skyfall" rose to number 2 on the UK Singles Chart with sales of 92,000 copies. This tied "Skyfall" with Duran Duran's "A View to a Kill" as the highest-charting James Bond theme song on the UK Singles Chart. This has since been broken when, in 2015, Sam Smith's "Writing's on the Wall" from Spectre debuted at number 1 on the UK Singles Chart. The song was the 20th best-selling song of 2012 in the UK with 547,000 sold. "Skyfall" debuted at number one on the Irish Singles Chart. It also charted at number one on the French Singles Chart for six weeks and spent 24 weeks in the top 10.

The song entered the Billboard Hot 100 at number 8 for the week ending 20 October 2012, becoming Adele's first song to debut in the top 10 with 261,000 copies sold in the United States during its first three days. Although "Skyfall" debuted at number 8, it was actually the third best-selling single in the US that week – the Hot 100 ranks songs based on sales, radio airplay, and online streaming. "Skyfall" is the first James Bond theme to chart within the top 10 in the US since Madonna's "Die Another Day" from the film of the same name a decade earlier and is the first James Bond theme to debut in the top 10. Interest in "Skyfall" led to a 10% increase in sales of Adele's last album, 21, in the US. For the week ending 27 October 2012, the second week after its release, the song fell from number 8 to number 13.

After Skyfall was released in cinemas in North America, Adele's song saw a sales increase of 66%. In January 2013, unofficial remixes also warranted the song an inclusion on the Billboard Hot Dance Club Songs chart, peaking at the 10th spot. After Adele won the Oscar for the song, sales in the US increased by 56% with 56,000 downloads. The following week, "Skyfall" sold an additional 103,000 downloads and climbed 28 spots on the Billboard Hot 100. As of July 2013, "Skyfall" has sold over five million copies worldwide. As of January 2013, it had sold 1,600,000 copies in the US according to Soundscan and is the first Bond song to sell a million digital copies.

== Accolades ==
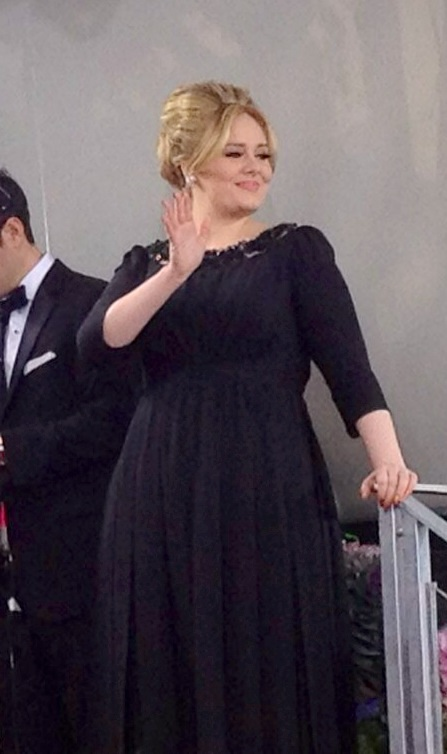
Adele at the 70th Golden Globe Awards, where "Skyfall" won the award for Best Original Song.

The song won the Academy Award for Best Original Song, which had been the first Bond theme to receive an Academy Award nomination since the 1981 song "For Your Eyes Only" from the film of the same name and was the first Bond theme to win the award. It also won the Critics' Choice Award for Best Song, the Golden Globe Award for Best Original Song, and the Brit Award for British Single. Adele gave her acceptance speech at the last of those awards through a video message, as she was in Los Angeles preparing for her Academy Award performance. It was also nominated at the Satellite Award for Best Original Song but lost to "Suddenly" from Les Misérables. "Skyfall" was also named the Best Original Song by the film critics associations of Georgia, Houston, Las Vegas, and Phoenix. The song also won the Grammy Award for Best Song Written for Visual Media.

| Year | Organisation | Award | Result | Ref. |
|---|---|---|---|---|
| 2012 | Satellite Awards | Best Original Song | Nominated | |
| 2013 | Academy Awards | Best Original Song | Won | |
| 2013 | BMI Film & TV Awards | Academy Award Winner | Won | |
| 2013 | BMI London Awards | Academy Award | Won | |
| 2013 | BMI London Awards | Pop Song Award | Won | |
| 2013 | Brit Awards | British Single | Won | |
| 2013 | Critics' Choice Movie Awards | Best Song | Won | |
| 2013 | Golden Globe Awards | Best Original Song | Won | |
| 2013 | Houston Film Critics Society | Best Original Song | Won | |
| 2013 | World Soundtrack Awards | Best Original Song Written Directly for a Film | Won | |
| 2014 | Grammy Awards | Best Song Written for Visual Media | Won | |

== Live performance and cover versions ==
- Adele performed the song live for the first time at the 85th Academy Awards ceremony on 24 February 2013, prior to learning that she had won the award.
- In 2012, the Dutch symphonic metal band Within Temptation covered the song during the recording sessions for their covers album, The Q-Music Sessions.
- In 2013, New Hampshire-based band Our Last Night included a cover version of "Skyfall" on the deluxe edition of their third album entitled Age of Ignorance.
- In 2017, international symphonic metal supergroup Exit Eden released a version of "Skyfall" as the 8th track of their debut album entitled Rhapsodies in Black.
- In 2025, Italian singers Giorgia and Annalisa won the fourth night of the 75th Sanremo Music Festival performing a cover of "Skyfall".
- In 2025, British singer Raye sang the opening verse and chorus of the song during the James Bond tribute at the 97th Academy Awards.

== Formats and track listings ==
- Digital download
1. "Skyfall" – 4:49
2. "Skyfall" (Peter Rauhofer Big Room Remix) – 10:00
- UK CD/7" vinyl single
1. "Skyfall" – 4:49
2. "Skyfall" (Instrumental) – 4:46

== Credits and personnel ==
Adapted from Discogs.

- Lead vocals and additional background vocals – Adele
- Songwriting – Adele Adkins, Paul Epworth
- Production – Paul Epworth
- Production assistants – Pete Hutchings, Joe Hartwell Jones
- Mixing – Tom Elmhirst
- Engineer – Matt Wiggins
- Master engineer – Tom Coyne
- Choir arrangement – Paul Epworth
- Choir master – Jenny O'Grady
- Orchestra contractor – Isobel Griffiths
- Assistant orchestra contractor – Charlotte Matthews
- Orchestral arrangement – Paul Epworth, J. A. C. Redford
- Orchestrator and conductor – J. A. C. Redford
- Orchestra leader – Thomas Bowes
- Orchestra recording – Simon Rhodes
- Percussion – Paul Epworth
- Guitar – James Reid
- Drums – Leo Taylor
- Piano – Nikolaj Torp Larsen
- Bass – Tom Herbert
- Choir – Metro Voices

Credits adapted from the liner notes of "Skyfall", XL Recordings.

== Charts ==
=== Weekly charts ===
Weekly chart performance for "Skyfall"
| Chart (2012–2013) | Peak position |
|---|---|
| Australia (ARIA) | 5 |
| Austria (Ö3 Austria Top 40) | 2 |
| Belgium (Ultratop 50 Flanders) | 1 |
| Belgium (Ultratop 50 Wallonia) | 1 |
| Brazil (Billboard Brasil Hot 100) | 25 |
| Brazil Hot Pop Songs | 3 |
| Canada Hot 100 (Billboard) | 3 |
| Czech Republic Airplay (ČNS IFPI) | 1 |
| Denmark (Tracklisten) | 2 |
| European Airplay (Nielsen Soundscan) | 2 |
| Finland (Suomen virallinen lista) | 15 |
| France (SNEP) | 1 |
| Germany (GfK) | 1 |
| Greece Digital Songs (Billboard) | 1 |
| Hong Kong (HKRIA) | 20 |
| Hungary (Rádiós Top 40) | 1 |
| Hungary (Single Top 40) | 1 |
| Iceland (RÚV) | 2 |
| Ireland (IRMA) | 1 |
| Irish Airplay (Nielsen Soundscan) | 10 |
| Israel International Airplay (Media Forest) | 1 |
| Italian Airplay (EarOne) | 2 |
| Italian Sales (FIMI) | 1 |
| Japan (Japan Hot 100) | 20 |
| Lebanon (Lebanese Top 20) | 1 |
| Luxembourg Digital Songs (Billboard) | 1 |
| Mexico (AMPROFON) | 21 |
| Netherlands (Dutch Top 40) | 1 |
| Netherlands (Single Top 100) | 1 |
| Netherlands Airplay (Nielsen Soundscan) | 2 |
| New Zealand (Recorded Music NZ) | 2 |
| Norwegian Airplay (Nielsen Soundscan) | 2 |
| Norwegian Sales (VG-lista) | 7 |
| Poland Airplay (ZPAV) | 5 |
| Portugal Digital Songs (Billboard) | 2 |
| Russia Airplay (TopHit) | 6 |
| Scottish Singles Sales (Official Charts) | 3 |
| Slovakia Airplay (ČNS IFPI) | 5 |
| South Korea Digital Chart(Gaon) | 69 |
| South Korea (Gaon International Chart) | 1 |
| Spain (Promusicae) | 4 |
| Switzerland (Schweizer Hitparade) | 1 |
| Ukraine Airplay (TopHit) | 5 |
| UK Radio Airplay (Nielsen Soundscan) | 1 |
| UK Singles (Official Charts) | 2 |
| UK TV Airplay (Nielsen Soundscan) | 32 |
| UK Independent (Official Charts) | 1 |
| US Billboard Hot 100 | 8 |
| US Adult Contemporary (Billboard) | 11 |
| US Adult Pop Airplay (Billboard) | 14 |
| US Dance Club Songs (Billboard) | 10 |
| US Pop Airplay (Billboard) | 37 |
| US Rock & Alternative Airplay (Billboard) | 37 |

| Chart (2021–2024) | Peak position |
|---|---|
| Global Excl. US (Billboard) | 128 |
| Greece International (IFPI) | 94 |
| India International (IMI) | 19 |
| Sweden Heatseeker (Sverigetopplistan) | 14 |

=== Year-end charts ===
Annual chart rankings for "Skyfall"
| Chart (2012) | Position |
|---|---|
| Austria (Ö3 Austria Top 40) | 40 |
| Belgium (Ultratop 50 Flanders) | 16 |
| Belgium (Ultratop 50 Wallonia) | 8 |
| Denmark(Tracklisten) | 37 |
| Finland (Suomen virallinen lista) | 13 |
| France (SNEP) | 5 |
| Germany (Media Control AG) | 17 |
| Hungary (Rádiós Top 40) | 38 |
| Italy (Musica e dischi) | 29 |
| Netherlands (Dutch Top 40) | 38 |
| Netherlands (Single Top 100) | 8 |
| Switzerland (Schweizer Hitparade) | 20 |
| Taiwan (Hito Radio) | 11 |
| UK Singles (Official Charts Company) | 20 |
| US Adult Contemporary (Billboard) | 43 |

| Chart (2013) | Position |
|---|---|
| Belgium (Ultratop 50 Flanders) | 50 |
| Belgium (Ultratop 50 Wallonia) | 20 |
| Canada (Canadian Hot 100) | 52 |
| Germany (Media Control AG) | 88 |
| Italy (FIMI) | 47 |
| Hungary (Rádiós Top 40) | 46 |
| Netherlands (Dutch Top 40) | 69 |
| Netherlands (Single Top 100) | 75 |
| Russia Airplay (TopHit) | 69 |
| Switzerland (Schweizer Hitparade) | 28 |
| Ukraine Airplay (TopHit) | 37 |
| US Adult Contemporary (Billboard) | 49 |

== Certifications and sales ==
| Region | Certification | Certified units/sales |
|---|---|---|
| Australia (ARIA) | Platinum | 70,000^{‡} |
| Belgium (BRMA) | Platinum | 30,000^{*} |
| Brazil (Pro-Música Brasil) | Diamond | 250,000^{‡} |
| Canada (Music Canada) | 5× Platinum | 400,000^{‡} |
| Denmark (IFPI Danmark) | Platinum | 30,000^{^} |
| Finland (Musiikkituottajat) | Gold | 5,214 |
| France | — | 336,000 |
| Germany (BVMI) | 3× Gold | 900,000^{‡} |
| Italy (FIMI) | 3× Platinum | 90,000^{*} |
| Mexico (AMPROFON) | 2× Platinum | 120,000^{*} |
| New Zealand (RMNZ) | 3× Platinum | 90,000^{‡} |
| South Korea (Gaon Chart) | — | 440,499 |
| Spain (Promusicae) | Platinum | 60,000^{‡} |
| United Kingdom (BPI) | 3× Platinum | 1,800,000^{‡} |
| United States (RIAA) | Platinum | 2,000,000 |
Streaming
| Greece (IFPI Greece) | 2× Platinum | 4,000,000^{†} |
^{*} Sales figures based on certification alone.^{^} Shipments figures based on certification alone.^{‡} Sales+streaming figures based on certification alone.^{†} Streaming-only figures based on certification alone.

== See also ==
- Outline of James Bond
