= Tomorrow Never Dies (song) =

Theme of the James Bond film Tomorrow Never Dies

Single by Sheryl Crow

from the album Tomorrow Never Dies: Music from the MGM Motion Picture
- B-side: "The Book"; "No One Said It Would Be Easy"; "Ordinary Morning"
- Released: December 1, 1997
- Studio: Magic Shop (New York City)
- Genre: Rock
- Length: 4:50
- Label: A&M
- Songwriters: Sheryl Crow; Mitchell Froom
- Producer: Mitchell Froom

Sheryl Crow singles chronology
| "Home" (1997) | "Tomorrow Never Dies" (1997) | "My Favorite Mistake" (1998) |

James Bond theme singles chronology
| "GoldenEye" (1995) | "Tomorrow Never Dies" (1997) | "The World Is Not Enough" (1999) |

Audio sample
- file; help

Music video
- "Tomorrow Never Dies" on YouTube

"Tomorrow Never Dies" is a song by American singer-songwriter Sheryl Crow that serves as the theme song to the 1997 James Bond film of the same name and its video game adaptation. The song, included on the film's soundtrack album, was co-written by Crow and the song's producer Mitchell Froom, and became her fifth UK top-20 hit, peaking at No. 12 in December 1997.

== History ==
Another song, "Tomorrow Never Dies", written by the film Tomorrow Never Dies' composer David Arnold and performed by k.d. lang, was originally produced as the official theme tune. When Sheryl Crow's song became the official theme, the k.d. lang song was relegated to the end credits and renamed "Surrender". The melody of "Surrender" still remains in Arnold's score. In addition to lang's song, the James Bond producers solicited tracks from other artists, including Pulp, the Cardigans, Saint Etienne, and Swan Lee. These ultimately were rejected in favour of Crow's song.

== Reception ==
=== Critical reception ===
Professional ratings
Review scores
| Source | Rating |
|---|---|
| Entertainment Weekly | 3/5 stars |

Larry Flick from Billboard wrote, "Crow steps forward with a tune that perfectly fuses her distinctive rock/pop style with the bombastic sound that has become the Bond signature. She wails with appropriate melodrama as an array of fluid guitar riffs and swooping strings and piano lines collide at the song's climax." He added, "It's a wonderfully delicious moment that tops off a stellar, deservedly hit-bound recording." Entertainment Weekly music critic Jim Farber negatively reviewed the song, explaining, "While Crow's music has the right swank and swing, her brittle voice lacks the operatic quality of the best Bond girls and boys, like Shirley Bassey, Tom Jones, or even Melissa Manchester. Tomorrow Never Dies should be for her ears only." (Manchester has never recorded a song for a James Bond film.) Farber called the choice of Crow "the worst hire since A-ha fronted one of these themes."

Writing for Filmtracks.com, Christian Clemmensen wished Lang's song had remained, and thought Crow's "beach-bum voice and lazy performance was a disgrace to the film." Pan-European magazine Music & Media wrote that "this is a topnotch song and a classy record. In true Bond style, it could best be described as a mini epic." A reviewer from Music Week gave it four out of five, stating that it "strikes the right cinematic note, relying on the traditional John Barry orchestral cues and kettle drum." NME also complimented the song, saying, "But, believe it or not, this is a low-key beauty and probably the best thing 'Miss' Crow has ever done. Crow has virtually reinvented the Bond theme by shrugging off the weight of history and playing it straight." A reviewer from Rolling Stone was critical, believing Lang's song to be superior. Ian Hyland from Sunday Mirror rated the song nine out of ten. He commented, "Miss Crow follows the fine tradition of Bond themery with a dreamily brilliant rock song demanding play after play."

=== Awards and nominations ===
At the 55th Golden Globe Awards, "Tomorrow Never Dies" received a nomination for Best Original Song, but it lost to "My Heart Will Go On" by James Horner and Will Jennings from Titanic. The song also received a nomination at the 41st Annual Grammy Awards for Best Song Written for a Motion Picture, Television or Other Visual Media, losing again to "My Heart Will Go On".

== Track listings ==
All songs were written by Sheryl Crow. Additional writers are credited in parentheses.

- UK CD1 and cassette single
1. "Tomorrow Never Dies" (full length version) (Mitchell Froom)
2. "The Book" (Jeff Trott)
3. "No One Said It Would Be Easy" (Bill Bottrell, Kevin Gilbert, Dan Schwartz)
4. "Ordinary Morning"
- UK CD2
1. "Tomorrow Never Dies" (Froom)
2. "Tomorrow Never Dies" (video)
- European CD and Japanese mini-CD single
1. "Tomorrow Never Dies" (LP version) (Froom) – 4:47
2. "Strong Enough" (LP version) (Bottrell, David Baerwald, Gilbert, Brian MacLeod, David Ricketts) – 3:10

== Personnel ==
- Sheryl Crow – vocals, piano
- Mitchell Froom – producer, additional keyboard
- Pete Thomas – drums
- Steve Donnelly – guitar
- Greg Cohen – acoustic bass
- Mark D. Feldman, Lorenza Ponce, Dylan Fitzgerald, Julianne Klopotic, Jane Scarpantoni, Matthew Pierce – strings
- Steve Rosenthal – engineer
- Tchad Blake – mixing

== Charts ==
=== Weekly charts ===
| Chart (1997–1998) | Peak position |
|---|---|
| Australia (ARIA) | 65 |
| Belgium (Ultratop 50 Flanders) | 36 |
| Belgium (Ultratop 50 Wallonia) | 19 |
| Canada Adult Contemporary (RPM) | 44 |
| Europe (Eurochart Hot 100) | 28 |
| Finland (Suomen virallinen lista) | 5 |
| France (SNEP) | 21 |
| Germany (GfK) | 52 |
| Greece (IFPI) | 3 |
| Iceland (Íslenski Listinn Topp 40) | 6 |
| Ireland (IRMA) | 22 |
| Netherlands (Dutch Top 40 Tipparade) | 13 |
| Netherlands (Single Top 100) | 43 |
| Quebec (ADISQ) | 12 |
| Scottish Singles Sales (Official Charts) | 14 |
| Sweden (Sverigetopplistan) | 30 |
| Switzerland (Schweizer Hitparade) | 12 |
| UK Singles (Official Charts) | 12 |

=== Year-end charts ===
| Chart (1997) | Position |
|---|---|
| UK Singles (OCC) | 165 |

| Chart (1998) | Position |
|---|---|
| Iceland (Íslenski Listinn Topp 40) | 66 |

== Certifications ==
| Region | Certification | Certified units/sales |
|---|---|---|
| Sweden (GLF) | Gold | 15,000^{^} |
^{^} Shipments figures based on certification alone.

== Release history ==
| Region | Date | Format(s) | Label(s) | Ref. |
|---|---|---|---|---|
| United Kingdom | December 1, 1997 | CD; cassette | A&M | |
| Japan | February 11, 1998 | Mini-CD | A&M | |

== Alternate rejected theme songs ==
While Sheryl Crow was ultimately selected to sing the theme to Tomorrow Never Dies, like others before it, it was not the only song recorded for the film. A top contender, alternative rock band Pulp, wrote a song for the film, which was later retitled "Tomorrow Never Lies" and released as a B-side to their This Is Hardcore album in 1998. Britpop band Saint Etienne recorded their own version of a song titled "Tomorrow Never Dies", which was later released as an exclusive to their fanclub on their Built on Sand album in 1999. Canadian country and pop singer k.d. lang's optioned theme, "Surrender", which was co-written by the film's composer, David Arnold, ended up being used as an end-title song.

== See also ==
- Outline of James Bond
