= Tomorrow Never Dies (soundtrack) =

Tomorrow Never Dies: Music from the MGM Motion Picture

Soundtrack album by David Arnold
- Released: November 27, 1997
- Recorded: 1997
- Label: A&M

Singles from Tomorrow Never Dies
- 1. "James Bond Theme" Released: 3 November 1997; 2. "Tomorrow Never Dies" Released: 1 December 1997

Professional ratings
Review scores
Source	Rating
Allmusic	4/5 stars
Filmtracks	5/5 stars
Uncut	3/5 stars

Tomorrow Never Dies: Music from the MGM Motion Picture is the soundtrack of the 18th James Bond film of the same name.

David Arnold composed the score of Tomorrow Never Dies, his first full Bond soundtrack. Arnold came to the producers' attention due to his successful cover interpretations in his 1997 album Shaken and Stirred: The David Arnold James Bond Project—which featured major artists performing classic James Bond title songs.

The theme tune was chosen through a competitive process. There were approximately twelve submissions; including songs from Swan Lee, Pulp, Saint Etienne, Marc Almond, Sheryl Crow and Duran Duran, the latter of which had previous co-written and performed the title song for a previous 007 film A View to a Kill (1985) . According to Nina Persson of Swedish pop group The Cardigans, they were also asked to submit a theme song candidate, but rejected the request due to exhaustion that would be exacerbated by the potential added workload; Persson has called her decision to turn down the offer "one of my biggest mistakes."

Crow's theme was eventually picked by Metro-Goldwyn-Mayer. In the meantime, a bold, brassy number in the classic John Barry/Shirley Bassey vein that Arnold himself wrote with David McAlmont and lyricist Don Black with the intent of being a theme, was relegated to the end credits with the title "Surrender". While McAlmont recorded the demo, "Surrender" was eventually recorded by k.d. lang after an extensive selective process.

The score itself follows Barry's classical style in both composition and orchestration, together with modern electronic rhythms present in most cues. Because the title song was changed so close to the film's release date, there was no time to work Crow's melody into any of the score. As a result, melody patterns from "Surrender" appear prominently many times in the score, mainly in the action cues, but it can also be heard in the dramatic "All in a Day's Work" track.

The DVD version of the film has an "isolated music track" allowing the viewer to watch the film with just the background music.

Scoring of the film had not been completed when the soundtrack was released so on January 11, 2000 a second album was released by Chapter III Records which removed the theme songs, Moby's "James Bond Theme" remake and "Station Break", and had additional music, as well as an interview with David Arnold.

In 2022, La-La Land Records released a two-disc limited and expanded edition of the complete score by Arnold. The title song is also contained in the release along with some unreleased material.

== Track listing ==
All music was composed by David Arnold, except where noted. Certain cues contain Monty Norman's "James Bond Theme".

=== 1997 release ===
1. "Tomorrow Never Dies" – Sheryl Crow (4:50)
2. "White Knight" (8:30) (Note: contains the "James Bond Theme", originally composed for the Dr. No soundtrack)
3. "The Sinking of the Devonshire" (7:07)
4. "Company Car" (3:08)
5. "Station Break" (3:30)
6. "Paris and Bond" (1:55)
7. "The Last Goodbye" (1:34)
8. "Hamburg Break In" (2:52)
9. "Hamburg Break Out" (1:26)
10. "Doctor Kaufman" (2:26)
11. "*-3-* Send" (1:17)
12. "Underwater Discovery" (3:37)
13. "Backseat Driver" – David Arnold and Alex Gifford of Propellerheads (4:37)
14. "Surrender" – k.d. lang (Music by David Arnold and David McAlmont, Lyrics by Don Black) (3:56)
15. "James Bond Theme" – Moby (3:12)

=== 2000 release ===
1. "White Knight" (8:29)
2. "Sinking of the Devonshire" (7:06)
3. "Company Car" (3:07)
4. "Paris and Bond" (1:55)
5. "Last Goodbye" (1:33)
6. "Hamburg Break In" (2:53)
7. "Hamburg Break Out" (1:24)
8. "Doctor Kaufman" (2:27)
9. "*-3-Send" (1:15)
10. "Backseat Driver" (4:34)
11. "Underwater Discovery" (3:36)
12. "Helicopter Ride" (1:34)
13. "Bike Chase" (6:44)
14. "Bike Shop Fight" (2:42)
15. "Kowloon Bay" (2:27)
16. "Boarding the Stealth" (4:38)
17. "A Tricky Spot for 007" (2:48)
18. "All in a Day's Work" (5:09)
19. "Exclusive David Arnold Interview" (11:02)

=== 2022 release ===
==== Disc 1 ====
1. "White Knight" (8:28)
2. "Backseat Pilot" (1:41)
3. "Tomorrow Never Dies" (Performed by Sheryl Crow) (4:50)
4. "The Sinking of the Devonshire" (Extended Version) (7:22)
5. "MI6 / Launch the Fleet" (1:34)
6. "Company Car (Extended Version)" (3:35)
7. "You Have a Phone Call, Mr. Bond" (1:02)
8. "Station Break" (3:29)
9. "Carver and Paris" (1:06)
10. "Paris and Bond (Film Version)" (1:56)
11. "The Last Goodbye" (1:34)
12. "Hamburg Break In" (2:52)
13. "Hamburg Break Out" (1:24)
14. "Printing Press Fight" (1:22)
15. "Escape to Hotel" (2:28)
16. "Doctor Kaufman" (2:27)
17. "*-3-Send" (1:15)
18. "Backseat Driver (Film Version)" (4:35)
19. "Okinawa / HALO Jump" (2:25)
20. "Underwater Discovery" (3:37)
21. "Vietnam" (1:36)
22. "Banner Escape" (1:10)
23. "Bike Chase" (6:43)
24. "Bike Shop Fight (Film Version)" (2:32)

==== Disc 2 ====
1. "Ha Long Bay" (2:32)
2. "Boarding The Stealth" (4:57)
3. "Grenade" (1:39)
4. "A Tricky Spot for 007" (3:49)
5. "Stealth Shoot Out" (3:33)
6. "Carver Gets It" (2:53)
7. "All in a Day’s Work" (5:08)
8. "Surrender (Performed by k.d. lang)" (3:56)
9. "White Knight (Original Version)" (8:37)
10. "Backseat Pilot (Original Version)" (2:20)
11. "The Sinking of the Devonshire (Original Version)" (5:37)
12. "Company Car" (3:06)
13. "Shaken But Not Stirred (Simon Greenaway / Sacha Collisson)" (3:27)
14. "It Had to Be You (Performed By Simon Greenaway)" 2:03
15. "Adrift (Simon Greenaway / Sacha Collisson)" (3:58)
16. "Paris and Bond" (1:56)
17. "The Last Goodbye (Alternate Version)" (1:30)
18. "Printing Press Fight (Film Opening)" (1:10)
19. "Backseat Driver" (4:35)
20. "Banner Escape (Film Mix)" (1:10)
21. "Bike Shop Fight" (2:42)
22. "Surrender (Alternate Version)" (Performed by k.d. lang) (3:53)

== See also ==
- Outline of James Bond
