= Dr. No (soundtrack) =

Film score by Monty Norman
- Released: 1963
- Recorded: June 1962
- Length: 39:17
- Label: United Artists Records

Singles from Dr. No
- 1. "James Bond Theme" Released: 1962

Professional ratings
Review scores
Source	Rating
AllMusic	3/5 stars

Dr. No is the film score for the 1962 film of the same name composed by Monty Norman.

== Scoring the film ==
Composer Monty Norman was selected by producer Albert R. Broccoli after Broccoli backed a musical of Norman's Belle or The Ballad of Dr. Crippen written by Wolf Mankowitz, a frequent collaborator with Norman and an original screenwriter for Dr. No. Norman's only previous film score had been The Two Faces of Dr. Jekyll (1960).

Norman traveled to Jamaica on the same chartered aircraft as the producers and many of the film's crew arriving on 14 January 1962. He met Chris Blackwell, a location scout and production assistant recommended to the producers by the author of the original Dr. No novel Ian Fleming. Blackwell introduced Norman to Byron Lee and the Dragonaires who performed the Jamaican music in the film. Lee and his band including guitarist Ernest Ranglin and trombonist Carlos Malcolm recorded the Jamaican parts of the score Ken Khouri's Federal Studios in Kingston, with Norman himself and his then wife Diana Coupland who accompanied Norman on the airplane containing the film's crew to Jamaica, recording vocals along with Byron Lee and the Dragonaires who appear in the film performing "Jump Up". The song "Under the Mango Tree" was performed by an uncredited Diana Coupland, backed by Ernest Ranglin on guitar. Ranglin also played on several other tracks. Lee recalled that most of their work was not used in the completed film but appeared on the soundtrack album.

The rest of Norman's score was orchestrated by his frequent arranger Bert Rhodes, to whom Norman gave half of his £500 fee, and was recorded at CTS Studios, 49–53 Kensington Gardens Square, Bayswater, London on 25 and 26 June 1962 with the 20–30 piece orchestra conducted by Eric Rogers. None of the orchestrated tracks appear on the soundtrack album.

The original "James Bond Theme" was written by Norman. John Barry, who would later go on to compose the music for eleven Bond films, arranged the theme, but was uncredited – except for the credit of his orchestra playing the final piece. John Barry claimed he, not Norman, originated the theme. This argument has been the subject of two law suits, the most recent in 2001. Some portions of the theme Norman claimed were based on music from the song "Good Sign, Bad Sign" that he composed for his un-staged musical several years previously, titled A House for Mr. Biswas. Vic Flick, the guitar player on the "James Bond Theme" states:

Norman is famous for writing the music to the first James Bond movie Dr No, and has been credited with writing the "James Bond Theme", the signature theme of the James Bond franchise. Norman has received royalties since 1962 for the theme, but it was arranged by John Barry after the producers were dissatisfied with Norman's music. Barry claims that he actually did write the theme, but nevertheless, Mr. Norman won two libel actions against publishers for claiming that Barry was the composer, most recently against The Sunday Times in 2001. During the trial, Barry testified on the stand that he had composed the James Bond Theme, but that Norman was contractually obligated to receive credit for the score.

Despite Barry's claims that he wrote the theme, the idea of the Bond melody can be easily heard in Norman's earlier song "Good Sign, Bad Sign", which could explain why Norman has prevailed twice in court to defend his authorship of the theme. The soundtrack album of Dr. No was not originally issued to coincide with the film's initial release in October 1962. However, in addition to his fee for orchestrating the "James Bond Theme", Barry was allowed to perform a different orchestration of the theme on Columbia Records. This became a top ten hit on the UK Singles Chart. The soundtrack album came out after the U.S. release of Dr. No in June 1963 with American cover version single recordings of "The James Bond Theme" by Al Caiola and Leroy Holmes on United Artists Records and Si Zentner on Liberty Records.

One musical theme that appears in three different orchestrations on the album: "Dr. No's Fantasy", "Twisting with James" and the misleadingly entitled "The James Bond Theme" (track 17 on the album, but entirely unrelated to the "track 1"), is not heard anywhere in the film. Diana Coupland recalled that it was Norman's first attempt at a '"James Bond Theme"'. Notable omissions from the soundtrack include the film's opening sci-fi electronic music sound effects (provided by Daphne Oram)/"James Bond Theme" gun barrel sequence, and Eric Rogers' symphonic arrangements of Norman's score including a brief theme for Miss Moneypenny (Lois Maxwell), the music from the tarantula scene, and Dr. Julius No (Joseph Wiseman)'s death (reused during the climax of the helicopter attack in From Russia with Love but not on that soundtrack album either).

== Track listing ==
1. "James Bond Theme" – John Barry Orchestra
2. "Kingston Calypso" (a version of "Three Blind Mice") – Byron Lee and the Dragonaires
3. "Jamaican Rock" (not heard in the film, a possible unused title track)
4. "Jump Up" – Byron Lee and the Dragonaires
5. "Audio Bongo" (an electronic music version of a musical theme for Dr. No)
6. "Under the Mango Tree" – Diana Coupland
7. "Twisting with James" (a version of "Dr. No's Fantasy" unused in the film)
8. "Jamaica Jazz" – (unused in the film, an instrumental of "Jump Up")
9. "Under the Mango Tree" – (Instrumental unused in the film)
10. "Jump Up" – Byron Lee and the Dragonaires
11. "Dr. No's Fantasy" (unused in the film)
12. "Kingston Calypso" – Diana Coupland
13. "The Island Speaks" (an instrumental version of a musical theme for Dr. No accompanying James Bond (Sean Connery) and Quarrel (John Kitzmiller) landing on Crab Key)
14. "Underneath the Mango Tree" – Monty Norman
15. "The Boy's Chase" (unused in the film; Norman recalled it was written for the car chase when Bond is driven from the airport)
16. "Dr. No's Theme" (an instrumental version of "Kingston Calypso")
17. "The James Bond Theme" (an unused instrumental version of "Dr. No's Fantasy")
18. "Love at Last" (heard briefly at the Queens Club)

== See also ==
- Outline of James Bond
