= Monty Norman =

British film score composer (1928–2022)

Background information
- Born: Monty Noserovitch; 4 April 1928; Stepney, London, England
- Died: 11 July 2022 (aged 94) Slough, England
- Genres: Musical theatre; film score
- Occupations: Composer; songwriter; singer
- Spouses: Diana Coupland (m. 1956; div. 1975); Rina Caesari (m. 2000)

Monty Norman (born Monty Noserovitch; 4 April 1928 – 11 July 2022) was a British film score composer and singer. A contributor to West End musicals in the 1950s and 1960s, he is best known for composing the "James Bond Theme", first heard in the 1962 film Dr. No. He was an Ivor Novello Award and Olivier Award winner, and a Tony Award nominee.

== Early life ==
Monty Norman was born on 4 April 1928 in Stepney in the East End of London. His father, Abraham Noserovitch (anglicised to Norman), was a Jewish cabinet maker who immigrated to the United Kingdom from Latvia when he was a child; his mother, Ann (né Berlyn), who was also Jewish, worked as a seamstress. He lived with his Jewish immigrant grandparents for the first few years of his life.

As a child during World War II, Norman was evacuated to St Albans from London but later returned during the Blitz. His mother gave him his first guitar (a Gibson) when he was sixteen. As a young man he did national service in the Royal Air Force, where he became interested in pursuing a career in singing. He also worked as a barber during this time.

== Career ==
During the 1950s and early 1960s, Norman was a singer for big bands such as those of Cyril Stapleton, Stanley Black, Ted Heath, and Nat Temple. He also sang in various variety shows, sharing top billing with other singers and comedy stars such as Benny Hill, Harry Secombe, Peter Sellers, Spike Milligan, Harry Worth, Tommy Cooper, Jimmy James, and Tony Hancock. One of his songs, "False-Hearted Lover", was successful internationally.

From the late 1950s, he moved from singing to composing, including songs for performers such as Cliff Richard, Tommy Steele, Count Basie, and Bob Hope, and lyrics for musicals and (subsequently) films. In 1957 and 1958, he wrote lyrics for the musicals Make Me an Offer, the English-language version of Irma la Douce (based on a 1956 French musical written by Alexandre Breffort and Marguerite Monnot; the English version was nominated for a Broadway Tony Award in 1961), and Expresso Bongo (which Time Out called the first rock and roll musical). Expresso Bongo, written by Wolf Mankowitz, was a West End hit and was later made into a 1960 film starring a young Cliff Richard. Norman's later musicals include Songbook (also known as The Moony Shapiro Songbook in New York), which was also nominated for a Broadway Tony and won an Ivor Novello Award; and Poppy (1982), which was also nominated for the Ivor Novello Award, and won the SWET award (renamed "the Laurence Olivier Awards" in 1984) for "Best Musical".

His further film work included music for the Hammer movie The Two Faces of Dr. Jekyll (1960), The Day the Earth Caught Fire (1961), the Bob Hope Eon Productions movie Call Me Bwana (1963), and the TV miniseries Dickens of London (1976).

Norman worked for several years on his unpublished autobiography, titled A Walking Stick Full of Bagels.

== James Bond Theme ==
Norman is best known for writing the "James Bond Theme", the signature theme of the James Bond franchise, and the score to the first James Bond film, Dr. No. Norman received royalty payments for the theme from 1962 on. However, as the producers were dissatisfied with Norman's arrangement, John Barry re-arranged the theme. Barry later claimed that it was actually he who wrote the theme, but Norman won two different libel actions refuting Barry's claim that he was the composer, the last against The Sunday Times in 2001. In the made-for-DVD documentary Inside Dr. No, Norman performed a music piece that he wrote for an unproduced stage musical based on A House for Mr Biswas several years earlier, entitled "Bad Sign, Good Sign", that he claimed resembles the melody of the "James Bond Theme" in several places.

Norman collected around £485,000 or $600,000 in royalties between 1976 and 1999 for the use of the theme since Dr. No.

== Personal life and death ==
Norman married actress Diana Coupland in 1956. Together, they had a daughter, before divorcing in 1975. He later married Rina Caesari in 2000. They remained married until his death. He was a worshipper at the Liberal Jewish Synagogue.

Norman died from COVID-19 and pneumonia at Wexham Park Hospital in Slough, on 11 July 2022, aged 94.

== Musicals ==
- Make Me an Offer (1958)
- Expresso Bongo (1958)
- Irma La Douce (1958)
- The Art of Living (revue, 1960)
- Belle or the Ballad of Dr. Crippen (1961)
- The Perils of Scobie Prilt (1963)
- Pinkus (1967)
- Quick, Quick, Slow (1969)
- Stand and Deliver (1972)
- So Who Needs Marriage? (1975)
- Songbook (1979)
- Poppy (1982)
- Pinocchio (1988)
