= The Roads We Choose – A Retrospective =

The Roads We Choose - A Retrospective

Compilation album by Chris Cornell
- Released: 2007

Chris Cornell chronology
Euphoria Morning (1999)	The Roads We Choose - A Retrospective (2007)	Carry On (2007)

The Roads We Choose – A Retrospective is a promo compilation album released by Chris Cornell. It spans his career as a whole, featuring songs from Temple of the Dog, Soundgarden and Audioslave, as well as material from his solo career. "The Roads We Choose" was a working title for the Audioslave song "Out of Exile". It is also a title of a bonus track on Cornell's album Carry On released few months after. A number of previously unreleased acoustic versions of songs were included, but these appear to have been recorded when Cornell was still with Audioslave/Soundgarden due to those bands being credited as the recording artists.

== Track listings ==
1. Chris Cornell - "No Such Thing" (from Carry On)
2. Soundgarden - "Black Hole Sun" (from Superunknown)
3. Temple of the Dog - "Hunger Strike" (from Temple of the Dog)
4. Soundgarden - "Outshined" (from Badmotorfinger)
5. Soundgarden - "The Day I Tried to Live" (from Superunknown)
6. Soundgarden - "Fell on Black Days" (from Superunknown)
7. Soundgarden - "Spoonman" (from Superunknown)
8. Soundgarden - "Blow Up the Outside World" (from Down on the Upside)
9. Audioslave - "Be Yourself" (from Out of Exile)
10. Audioslave - "Original Fire" (acoustic)
11. Audioslave - "Show Me How to Live" (from Audioslave)
12. Chris Cornell - "Can't Change Me" (from Euphoria Morning)
13. Temple of the Dog - "Say Hello 2 Heaven" (from Temple of the Dog)
14. Audioslave - "Like a Stone" (acoustic)
15. Audioslave - "Black Hole Sun" (acoustic) (original version of song by Soundgarden)
16. Chris Cornell - "You Know My Name" (from Carry On, originally appeared on the Casino Royale soundtrack)
17. Chris Cornell - "Arms Around Your Love" (from Carry On)
- The three acoustic songs are taken from the Audioslave Clear Channel Stripped session in 2006.
