= Quantum of Solace (soundtrack) =

Quantum of Solace: Original Motion Picture Soundtrack

Soundtrack album by David Arnold
- Released: 17 October 2008
- Recorded: 2007–2008
- Genre: Film score
- Length: 61:24
- Label: J
- Producer: David Arnold

David Arnold chronology
| How to Lose Friends & Alienate People (2008) | Quantum of Solace: Original Motion Picture Soundtrack (2008) | The Chronicles of Narnia: The Voyage of the Dawn Treader (2010) |

Singles from Quantum of Solace: Original Motion Picture Soundtrack
- 1. "Another Way to Die" Released: September 30, 2008 (US), October 20, 2008

Professional ratings
Review scores
| Source | Rating |
|---|---|
| AllMusic | 3.5/5 stars |
| Filmtracks | 3/5 stars |
| IGN | 7.8/10 stars |
| Movie Music UK | 3.5/5 stars |
| Movie Wave | 4/5 stars |
| SoundtrackNet | 3.5/5 stars |

Quantum of Solace: Original Motion Picture Soundtrack is the soundtrack album for the James Bond film of the same name. Released on 17 October 2008. The album contains the score composed by David Arnold. It is Arnold's fifth and currently last soundtrack for the James Bond franchise. His frequent collaborator Nicholas Dodd orchestrated and conducted the score.

== Development ==
David Arnold, who composed the scores for the previous four James Bond films, said that Quantum of Solace director Marc Forster likes to work very closely with his composers and that, in comparison to the accelerated schedule he was tied to for the score of the previous 2006 installment Casino Royale, the intention was to spend a long time scoring the film to "really work it out". He also said he would be "taking a different approach" with the score. Arnold composed the music based on impressions from reading the script, and Forster edited those into the film.

Mark Ronson and Amy Winehouse recorded a demo track for the film, but Ronson explained that she was "not ready to record any music" at that time. It was announced Jack White of The White Stripes and Alicia Keys would collaborate on "Another Way to Die", which is the first duet in Bond music history, on 29 July 2008. They had wanted to work together for two years beforehand. The song was recorded in Nashville, Tennessee; White played the drums while Keys performed on the piano. The Memphis Horns also contributed to the track. White's favourite Bond theme is John Barry's 1969 instrumental piece for On Her Majesty's Secret Service, and he watched various opening credit sequences from the series for inspiration while mixing the track.

The soundtrack was released by J Records, Keys' record label, though Keys appears on only one track. The track listing follows the order of the music's use within the film, with the exception of the title song being moved to the end of the album (in the film, it appears immediately after the first track, "Time to Get Out"). It is presented in the full-length single-release version, rather than the shorter mix heard over the film's opening titles. One notable omission is the fully orchestrated "James Bond Theme", which features, as it did in Casino Royale, only at the film's conclusion, but this time over the traditional gun barrel walk-on-and-shoot as well as the start of the end titles. Another omission is Four Tet's instrumental closing theme that follows it, playing over the remainder of the credits and entitled "Crawl, End Crawl" within them. This track was later made available on iTunes. Other tracks listed heard in the film (but not on the album) are played during scenes such as Dominic Greene (Mathieu Amalric)'s charity fundraising party (i.e., "Cholo Soy", "Regresa", and "El Provinciano" by Jaime Cuadra); and Giacomo Puccini's opera Tosca forms the backdrop to a key sequence.

== Leitmotifs ==
Composer David Arnold uses six recurring leitmotifs throughout Quantum of Solace. One is tied to the villainous Quantum organization, characterized by ominous brass figures and low-register orchestration, giving the organization a sinister presence. Another represents Bond’s pursuit of revenge, expressed through a rising motif often played on harp or woodwinds. Camille, Bond’s Bolivian ally, is assigned a theme performed on panflute. Vesper Lynd’s theme from Casino Royale returns, played on solo piano to reflect Bond’s lingering grief throughout the movie. The "James Bond Theme" is used sparingly, woven into key moments of confidence and action. Arnold also introduces his own six-note main theme that would later provide the basis for the song “No Good About Goodbye”, which appeared on Shirley Bassey's 2009 album The Performance. A brief reprise of the Casino Royale title theme “You Know My Name” appears in "Talamone", bridging the narrative between the two films as Bond meets up with Mathis, a character returning from the previous film.

Quantum Theme

- 6. "Greene & Camille" (1:17-1:35)
- 7. "Pursuit at Port au Prince"
- 8. "No Interest in Dominic Greene" (1:40-1:55)
- 9. "Night at the Opera" (0:16-3:04)
- 16. "DC3"
- 17. "Target Terminated"
- 20. "Have You Ever Killed Someone?"
- 22. "The Dead Don't Care About Vengeance"

Revenge Theme

- 3. "Inside Man" (0:03-0:08)
- 7. "Pursuit at Port au Prince" (0:06-0:35)
- 8. "No Interest in Dominic Greene" (0:45-1:38)
- 9. "Night at the Opera" (0:03-3:04)
- 20. "Have You Ever Killed Someone?"
- 21. "Perla de las Dunas"

Camille Theme

- 6. "Greene & Camille" (0:34-1:05)
- 18. "Camille's Story"
- 20. "Have You Ever Killed Someone?"
- 21. "Perla de las Dunas"

Vesper Theme

- 12. "What's Keeping You Awake"
- 15. "Forgive Yourself"
- 18. "Camille's Story"
- 23. "I Never Left"

James Bond Theme

- 1. "Time to Get Out" (3:11-3:22)
- 4. "Bond in Haiti" (0:09-0:20)
- 7. "Pursuit at Port au Prince" (5:34-5:50)
- 11. "Talamone"
- 13. "Bolivian Taxi Ride"
- 14. "Field Trip"
- 19. "Oil Fields"
- 21. "Perla de las Dunas"
- 23. "I Never Left"

No Good About Goodbye Theme

- 1. "Time to Get Out" (3:00-3:06)
- 2. "The Palio"
- 6. "Greene & Camille" (1:48-1:52)
- 7. "Pursuit at Port au Prince" (4:36-4:40, 5:20-5:30)
- 11. "Talamone"
- 23. "I Never Left"

You Know My Name Theme

- 11. "Talamone"

== Track listing ==
All music is composed by David Arnold unless stated otherwise.

| No. | Title | Length |
|---|---|---|
| 1. | "Time to Get Out" (Contains the "James Bond Theme", originally composed for the Dr. No soundtrack) | 3:28 |
| 2. | "The Palio" | 4:59 |
| 3. | "Inside Man" (Contains the "James Bond Theme", originally composed for the Dr. No soundtrack) | 0:38 |
| 4. | "Bond in Haiti" (Contains the "James Bond Theme", originally composed for the Dr. No soundtrack) | 0:35 |
| 5. | "Somebody Wants to Kill You" | 2:17 |
| 6. | "Greene & Camille" | 2:13 |
| 7. | "Pursuit at Port au Prince" (Contains the "James Bond Theme", originally composed for the Dr. No soundtrack) | 5:58 |
| 8. | "No Interest in Dominic Greene" | 2:44 |
| 9. | "Night at the Opera" | 3:02 |
| 10. | "Restrict Bond's Movements" | 1:31 |
| 11. | "Talamone" (Contains the "James Bond Theme", originally composed for the Dr. No soundtrack) | 0:35 |
| 12. | "What's Keeping You Awake" | 1:41 |
| 13. | "Bolivian Taxi Ride" (Contains the "James Bond Theme", originally composed for the Dr. No soundtrack) | 0:49 |
| 14. | "Field Trip" (Contains the "James Bond Theme", originally composed for the Dr. No soundtrack) | 0:41 |
| 15. | "Forgive Yourself" | 2:26 |
| 16. | "DC3" | 1:15 |
| 17. | "Target Terminated" | 3:54 |
| 18. | "Camille's Story" | 3:59 |
| 19. | "Oil Fields" (Contains the "James Bond Theme", originally composed for the Dr. No soundtrack) | 2:29 |
| 20. | "Have You Ever Killed Someone?" | 1:33 |
| 21. | "Perla de las Dunas" (Contains the "James Bond Theme", originally composed for the Dr. No soundtrack) | 8:08 |
| 22. | "The Dead Don't Care About Vengeance" | 1:14 |
| 23. | "I Never Left" (Contains the "James Bond Theme", originally composed for the Dr. No soundtrack) | 0:40 |
| 24. | "Another Way to Die" (Performed by Jack White and Alicia Keys) | 4:24 |

== See also ==
- Outline of James Bond
