= Hot Fuzz (soundtrack) =

2007 soundtrack album by various artists

Soundtrack album by Various Artists
- Released: (United Kingdom) 22 February 2007 (United States) 17 April 2007
- Genres: Rock, psychedelic rock, pop, alternative rock, hard rock, Britpop, new wave, indie rock, glam rock
- Length: 76:13
- Label: Island
- Producer: Osymyso

David Arnold chronology
Casino Royale (2006)	Hot Fuzz (2007)	Amazing Grace (2007)

Professional ratings
Review scores
Source	Rating
AllMusic	4/5 stars
Empire	4/5 stars

Hot Fuzz: Music from the Motion Picture is the soundtrack album to the 2007 British crime-comedy film, Hot Fuzz. The album was released on 19 February 2007 in the United Kingdom, and on 17 April 2007 in the United States and Canada. The UK release contains 22 tracks, and the US/Canada release has 14. In 2023 La La Land Records release a 2 disc expanded edition of the complete film score.

== Composition ==
The film's score is by British film composer David Arnold, who has scored the James Bond film series since 1997. Among Arnold's works featured on the soundtrack album is the "Hot Fuzz Suite", which is a compilation of excerpts from the score.

Other music from the film is a mix of 1960s and 1970s British rock (The Kinks, T.Rex, The Move, Sweet, The Troggs, Arthur Brown, Cozy Powell), new wave (Adam Ant, XTC) and indie UK and American rock (The Fratellis, Eels, Jon Spencer).

Dialogue by Simon Pegg, Nick Frost and various other cast members is interwoven into the music itself, rather than being on separate tracks.

=== Themes ===
The song selection also includes some police-themed titles, including Supergrass' "Caught by the Fuzz" as well as "Here Come the Fuzz", which was specially composed for the film by The Jon Spencer Blues Explosion. The film score also references and parodies the scores from action films, with the song "Lethal Fuzz", containing samples of the music used in promotional trailers from the first four films of the Lethal Weapon series.

=== Credits ===
American film director Robert Rodriguez contributed to the film's score, and is acknowledged in the UK album's liner notes. The liner notes also credit music supervisor Nick Angel (the person who Simon Pegg's character is named after) and the film's director Edgar Wright as executive producers, while British mashup and breakbeat DJ Osymyso (Mark Nicholson) is credited as producer. Kathy Nelson is listed as Executive producer in charge of music at Universal Pictures: Osymyso had previously worked with Pegg and Wright on their previous film, Shaun of the Dead.

== Track listings ==
UK/EU Release
No.	Title	Writer(s)	Artist	Length
1.	"Theme from Hot Fuzz"	David Arnold	David Arnold	2:11
2.	"Goody Two Shoes"	Marco Pirroni and Adam Ant	Adam Ant	3:34
3.	"Sgt. Rock (Is Going to Help Me)"	Andy Partridge	XTC	3:35
4.	"The Village Green Preservation Society"	Ray Davies	The Kinks	2:56
5.	"Solid Gold Easy Action"	Marc Bolan	T.Rex	2:14
6.	"Baby Fratelli"	The Fratellis	The Fratellis	3:53
7.	"Blockbuster!"	Mike Chapman and Nicky Chinn	Sweet	3:21
8.	"Dance with the Devil"	Phil Dennys and Michael Hayes	Cozy Powell	3:15
9.	"Slippery Rock 70's"	Nigel Fletcher and Robert Woodward	Stavely Makepeace	2:38
10.	"Uncle Derek" (Dialogue extract)	Edgar Wright and Simon Pegg	Simon Pegg and Nick Frost	0:31
11.	"Night of Fear"	Roy Wood	The Move	2:10
12.	"I Can't Control Myself"	Reg Presley	The Troggs	3:02
13.	"Fire"	Arthur Brown, Vincent Crane, Peter Ker and Michael Ivor Firesilver	The Crazy World of Arthur Brown	2:47
14.	"Kick Out the Jams"	Jeff Jarratt and Don Reedman	Tubthumper	2:20
15.	"Lethal Fuzz (Osymyso Remix)" (Samples music used in trailers for Lethal Weapon.)	John Eric Alexander	John Eric Alexander	2:01
16.	"Avenging Angel"	Robert Rodriguez	Robert Rodriguez	0:35
17.	"Souljacker Part 1"	Mark Oliver Everett, Jonathan "Butch" Norton and Adam Siegel	Eels	3:16
18.	"Caught by the Fuzz"	Gareth Coombes, Daniel Goffy and Michael Quinn	Supergrass	2:17
19.	"Solid Gold Easy Action"	Marc Bolan	The Fratellis	2:16
20.	"What did you think of that?" (Dialogue extract)	Edgar Wright and Simon Pegg	Simon Pegg and Nick Frost	0:16
21.	"Here Come the Fuzz"	Philip Hernandez, Chris Maxwell and Jon Spencer	Jon Spencer and the Elegant Trio	3:52
22.	"Hot Fuzz Suite" (Compilation of excerpts from the score.)	David Arnold	David Arnold	23:11

USA/Canada Release
No.	Title	Writer(s)	Artist	Length
1.	"Goody Two Shoes"	Marco Pirroni and Adam Ant	Adam Ant	3:34
2.	"Sgt. Rock (Is Going to Help Me)"	Andy Partridge	XTC	3:35
3.	"The Village Green Preservation Society"	Ray Davies	The Kinks	2:56
4.	"Baby Fratelli"	The Fratellis	The Fratellis	3:53
5.	"Dance with the Devil"	Phil Dennys and Michael Hayes	Cozy Powell	3:15
6.	"Slippery Rock 70's"	Nigel Fletcher and Robert Woodward	Stavely Makepeace	2:38
7.	"I Can't Control Myself"	Reg Presley	The Troggs	3:02
8.	"Fire"	Arthur Brown, Vincent Crane, Peter Ker and Michael Ivor Firesilver	The Crazy World of Arthur Brown	2:47
9.	"Lethal Fuzz (Osymyso Remix)"	John Eric Alexander	John Eric Alexander	2:01
10.	"Souljacker Part 1"	Mark Oliver Everett, Jonathan "Butch" Norton and Adam Siegel	Eels	3:16
11.	"Caught by the Fuzz"	Gareth Coombes, Daniel Goffy and Michael Quinn	Supergrass	2:17
12.	"Solid Gold Easy Action"	Marc Bolan	The Fratellis	2:16
13.	"Here Come the Fuzz"	Philip Hernandez, Chris Maxwell and Jon Spencer	Jon Spencer and the Elegant Trio	3:52
14.	"Hot Fuzz Suite"	David Arnold	David Arnold	23:11

== Other songs in the film ==
Songs featured in the film but not included on either soundtrack release include:

- "Down On Bond Street" – Tommy McCook & the Super Sonics
- "Foot Chase" – Mark Isham (from Point Break)
- "Happy Birthday" – Jim Broadbent, Olivia Colman, Kevin Eldon, Karl Johnson, Simon Pegg & Edgar Wright (sung by the police for Danny's birthday)
- "Heston Services" – Robert Rodriguez and Carl Thiel
- "Hostage Situation" – Trevor Rabin (from Bad Boys II)
- "Lethal Weapon 3 Trailer Score" – John Eric Alexander
- "Lovefool" – Dick Breeze, Emma Dance, David Goodall, Diane Leach, Tim Lee, George Marsh, Lucy Punch, David Threlfall, Bernard Usher, Clive Weatherley & Jonathan Whitehead (sung by the cast of an amateur Romeo and Juliet play)
- "Nostalgia" – Frank Comstock
- "Romeo and Juliet" by Dire Straits. In his DVD commentary, director Edgar Wright notes the irony of having to pay Dire Straits to use the song after he had poked fun at the band in his previous film, Shaun of the Dead.
- "Village Green" by The Kinks.

== See also ==
- Hot Fuzz
- Three Flavours Cornetto
