= Eleven (band) =

American alternative rock group (1990–2007)

- Left to right: Jack Irons, Natasha Shneider, Alain Johannes.

Background information
- Origin: Los Angeles, California, USA
- Genres: Alternative rock, grunge, hard rock
- Years active: 1990–2007
- Labels: Morgan Creek, Third Rail, A&M
- Spinoff of: What Is This?
- Past members: Alain Johannes; Jack Irons; Natasha Shneider; Matt Cameron; Greg Upchurch; Ric Markmann

Eleven was an American alternative rock supergroup from Los Angeles, California, formed in 1990 by Alain Johannes (vocals, guitar, sitar, horns), Natasha Shneider (vocals, keyboards, bass), and Jack Irons (drums).

== History ==
Eleven's early history is intertwined with that of the Red Hot Chili Peppers. As teenagers Irons and Johannes formed the band Anthym with Flea and Hillel Slovak; this band was soon to be renamed What Is This?. The members of What Is This? then joined with Anthony Kiedis to form the Red Hot Chili Peppers, but Slovak and Irons also continued to record with Johannes, and What Is This? released the EP Squeezed with Chris Hutchinson playing bass. After the recording of the self-titled second What Is This? album, Slovak and Irons discontinued the band to concentrate full-time on the Red Hot Chili Peppers.

Johannes and Shneider met and formed the duo Walk The Moon, which featured Irons and Hutchinson on several tracks. When Irons later left the Red Hot Chili Peppers he teamed up with his former bandmate Johannes and his new partner to form Eleven.

Midway through the recording of Eleven's third album, Thunk, Irons departed again to drum with Pearl Jam, and Matt Cameron played drums on the album's remaining four tracks. Irons was replaced by Greg Upchurch for their fourth album, Avantegardedog, but returned to the band once again prior to the recording of their fifth album, Howling Book. Rick Markmann played bass for Eleven on stage, though he did not feature on any of their albums.

Eleven toured with Pearl Jam, Soundgarden, Queens of the Stone Age and Candlebox, and Johannes and Shneider also became a sought-after production team that worked on albums such as Chris Cornell's Euphoria Morning (on which they also wrote, performed and toured), No Doubt's Return of Saturn, Steadman's Revive, and The Desert Sessions 7&8 and 9&10 with Josh Homme. Most of the recording took place at 11AD, their home studio; Howling Book was self-produced, recorded and mixed in its entirety at 11AD.

The band has cited as their major influences Jimmy Page and Led Zeppelin, Queen, The Beatles, Johann Sebastian Bach, and Sergei Prokofiev. With Chris Cornell, they recorded Shneider's arrangement of Franz Schubert's "Ave Maria", which appears on the album A Very Special Christmas 3, in the liner notes of which they state they deliberately chose a classical work to help interest young people in classical music.

Johannes and Shneider contributed the theme for the film Catwoman. The track was composed by Johannes and Shneider with Shneider credited as the performer rather than the band.

On July 2, 2008, Natasha Shneider died following a battle with cancer. The news broke with a message posted on the Myspace page of the band Sweethead, of which Natasha's former bandmate Troy Van Leeuwen is a member and was a close friend:

Natasha Shneider, musician extraordinaire, former actress, singer of the ground-breaking band Eleven, and one-time Queens of the Stone Age keyboard player, died today at 11:11 am of cancer. She was a brilliant, beautiful, and ballsy woman who will be missed deeply by all those who knew her. Send your loving thoughts her way in the universe.

— Sweethead Myspace page, 2008

Another tribute message later replaced the main page at the official website of Queens of the Stone Age.

According to Eleven's July 11, 2007, Myspace blog, they were working on a sixth album that they planned to have released by the fall. No release date has been announced and it is unclear how much, if any, of a new album was completed.

Johannes and Irons later were part of the band Spinnerette, in which Johannes had a major hand in songwriting. Shneider is credited with "spiritual guidance."

== Discography ==
=== Albums ===
- Awake in a Dream (1991)
- Eleven (1993)
- Thunk (1995)
- Avantgardedog (2000)
- Howling Book (2003)
- This Little Finger (2011) [EP]

=== Promos ===
- Vowel Movement (1991)
- Rainbow's End (1991)
- Why (1995)
- All Falls Away/You're Not Alone (2000)
