= Awake in a Dream =

Awake in a Dream may refer to:

- Awake in a Dream (album), an album by Eleven
- Awake in a Dream (song), a single by Kalan Porter
