= Amazing Grace (score) =

Amazing Grace: Original Score from the Motion Picture

Soundtrack album by David Arnold
- Released: March 6, 2007 (digital); March 20, 2007 (physical)
- Genre: Film score
- Length: 43:05
- Label: Sparrow
- Producer: David Arnold

David Arnold chronology
Hot Fuzz (2007)	Amazing Grace: Original Score from the Motion Picture (2007)	Agent Crush (2008)

Amazing Grace: Original Score from the Motion Picture is another soundtrack for the movie Amazing Grace starring Ioan Gruffudd, featuring an original score composed by David Arnold.

== History ==
David Arnold, who is best known for composing scores for films, such as Independence Day, Stargate, and Godzilla, completed his journey from the film genres of action-adventure to art house. Amazing Grace is based on the 20-year crusade of William Wilberforce to end slavery in the British Empire, as Arnold includes the scores of quasi-folk songs to Negro spirituals; his basic material, however, remains unchanged from earlier projects.

Arnold's tone for this project is far more earnest than before, one that hears distant echos of "Britten's Sinfonia da Requiem" and "Four Sea Interludes" at times, but his score has the merit of being the music that solely functions as an adjunct with an imaging enhancement on the screen, as a medium, not the message.

== Production ==
Composer Nicholas Dadd produced, orchestrated, and conducted on this soundtrack. It features an unnamed group of session musicians contracted by Isobel Griffiths.

== Track listing ==
All songs written and composed by David Arnold.

No.	Title	Length
1.	"Opening Title"	3:46
2.	"Torture"	0:47
3.	"Fetch Him"	1:17
4.	"God and Nature"	1:07
5.	"Politics and Religion"	1:31
6.	"Good Morning John"	1:41
7.	"Ghosts"	1:47
8.	"The 2nd Nightmare"	1:41
9.	"The Slave Ship"	2:19
10.	"The Gardens"	1:46
11.	"We Have Hope"	1:46
12.	"Courting"	1:03
13.	"Parliament"	1:58
14.	"Dark Meeting"	0:48
15.	"Will of the People"	2:43
16.	"Rejecting the Bill"	1:34
17.	"Waking the Demons"	1:35
18.	"Off the Ship"	0:52
19.	"Cheat the Law"	0:47
20.	"Devious Plan"	1:13
21.	"Something's Up"	2:28
22.	"No More"	1:44
23.	"Dying"	3:40
24.	"Triumph"	3:12
25.	"Amazing Grace" (Bagpipe Instrumental*)	2:58
Total length:		43:05

( * = iTunes album-only bonus track)

== Awards ==
In 2008, the album won a Dove Award for Instrumental Album of the Year at the 39th GMA Dove Awards.
