= The Remix Album...Diamonds Are Forever =

Remix album by Shirley Bassey
- Released: 28 August 2000
- Label: EMI; Nettwerk

Shirley Bassey chronology
The Show Must Go On (1996)	The Remix Album...Diamonds Are Forever (2000)	The Greatest Hits – This Is My Life (2000)

Alternative cover
- US album cover

The Remix Album...Diamonds Are Forever is a remix album by Welsh singer Shirley Bassey, released in 2000. It contains some of Bassey's most popular songs, along with lesser-known Bassey tracks, remixed by contemporary DJs and producers such as Kenny "Dope" Gonzalez, Kurtis Mantronik, Nightmares on Wax, Groove Armada, Mark Brydon from Moloko (under the alias DJ Skymoo), and Propellerheads, who had collaborated with Bassey three years earlier on their single, "History Repeating".

The awayTEAM remix of Bassey's 1971 hit, "Where Do I Begin", was released as a single, reaching number 100 in the UK Singles Chart in 2000.

== Critical reception ==
Professional ratings
Review scores
Source	Rating
AllMusic	2/5 stars

In a review for AllMusic, Mark Keresman gave The Remix Album...Diamonds Are Forever two out of five stars, writing that the album "is not for old-school fans of unadulterated Bassey, but club denizens will find a lot to groove to here."

== Track listing ==
No.	Title	Writer(s)	Length
1.	"Where Do I Begin" (awayTEAM Mix)	Francis Lai; Carl Sigman	5:36
2.	"Goldfinger" (Propellerheads Mix)	John Barry; Leslie Bricusse; Anthony Newley	5:53
3.	"Light My Fire" (Kenny Dope Remix)	Jim Morrison; Robby Krieger; John Densmore; Ray Manzarek	5:04
4.	"Diamonds Are Forever" (Mantronik 007 Mix)	Barry; Don Black	3:13
5.	"Easy Thing to Do" (Nightmares on Wax)	Johnny Harris; John Bromley	4:43
6.	"Never Never Never" (Groove Armada Mix)	Tony Renis; Alberto Testa; Norman Newell	6:08
7.	"Big Spender" (Wild Oscar Mix)	Cy Coleman; Dorothy Fields	5:04
8.	"Spinning Wheel" (DJ Spinna Remix)	David Clayton-Thomas	4:04
9.	"Light My Fire" (Twelftree's Lady Mix)	Morrison; Krieger; Densmore; Manzarek	4:04
10.	"If You Go Away" (DJ Skymoo Mix)	Jacques Brel; Rod McKuen	7:06

US version extra tracks
No.	Title	Writer(s)	Length
11.	"Moonraker" (Superfunk Mix)	Barry; Hal David	4:24
12.	"Diamonds Are Forever" (Mantronik Diamond Cut Club Mix)	Barry; Black	6:07
13.	"Light My Fire" (Twelftree's Full Mix)	Morrison; Krieger; Densmore; Manzarek	8:40

== Personnel ==
Musicians (track 1)

- Andrew Currie – trombone
- Simon Currie – saxophone
- John Hoare – trumpet
- Denny Ilett – horn arrangement
- Andrew Kremer – double bass
- Duncan McNaughton – trumpet
- Ian Smith – trumpet
- Martyn Sumner – trombone
- Mike Wills – saxophone

Production

- Ralph Alfonso – US design
- AP – art direction & design
- awayTEAM – remix & additional production (track 1)
- Steven Barkan – mix engineer (track 3)
- Mark Brydon – remix (track 10)
- Albert Cabrera – edits (track 4)
- DJ E.A.S.E. – additional production (track 5)
- DJ Spinna – remix (track 8)
- Kenny "Dope" Gonzalez – re-edit (track 3)
- Groove Armada – remix & additional production (track 6)
- Andrew Heermans – mixer (track 4)
- Jak – engineer and remixer (track 9)
- Kurtis Mantronik – producer, mixer (track 4)
- Ciara Nolan – project manager, cover image design
- Propellerheads – remix & additional production (track 2)
- Oscar Ramirez – assistant engineer (track 3)
- Nick Robinson – A&R
- Wild Oscar – remix & additional production (track 7)
- Bram Ttwheam – cover image design
- Robin Twelftree – remix & additional production (track 9)
- Bruce Wood – engineer (track 5)

== Charts ==
Chart (2000)	Peak position
German Albums (Offizielle Top 100)	63
Scottish Albums (OCC)	67
UK Albums (OCC)	62
