= Quantum of Solace (disambiguation) =

Quantum of Solace is a 2008 James Bond film.

Quantum of Solace can also refer to several topics related to James Bond:

- "Quantum of Solace" (short story), from the For Your Eyes Only short story collection by Ian Fleming
- Quantum of Solace (soundtrack), the soundtrack to the film
- 007: Quantum of Solace, the video game based on the film
