= Take California =

Single by Propellerheads

from the album Decksandrumsandrockandroll
- Released: 1996
- Genre: Big beat
- Length: 7:48 (Long One); 7:23 (Album version); 4:00 (Short One); 3:19 ("Go On, Force Me" edit)
- Label: Wall of Sound
- Composer: Alex Gifford

Propellerheads singles chronology
"Take California" (1996)	"Spybreak!" (1997)

"Take California" is a 1996 single by the British big beat group Propellerheads.

There are two versions of this song, called "Take California (Go On, Force Me Edit)" and "Take California (Album Version)". The latter is approximately four minutes longer than the former.

The song is instrumental except for its repeated eponymous sample of Richard M. Nixon’s speech from an interview by Earle Doud and Alen Robin.

== Awards and accolades ==
"Take California" was nominated for the Grammy Awards of 1999 in the category of Best Rock Instrumental Performance. NPR recognized the song as one of eleven essential Big Beat songs.

== Usage in media ==
The song was featured in the first iPod commercial in October 2001. The song was also included on the soundtrack of the 1999 film Forces of Nature, and appeared in the 1998 film Uprising.

== Track listing ==
- CD Maxi-Single
1. "Take California (Go On, Force Me Edit)" – 3:17
2. "Take California And Party" – 5:39
3. "Take California (Album Version)" – 7:24
4. "Echo And Bounce" – 5:26

== See also ==
- iPod advertising: original ad
- songs featured in the film Any Given Sunday
