= History Repeating (song) =

1997 single by Propellerheads

Single by Propellerheads featuring Shirley Bassey

from the album Decksandrumsandrockandroll
- Released: 8 December 1997 (UK)
- Recorded: 1997
- Genre: Big beat; jazz
- Length: 4.03
- Label: Wall of Sound
- Songwriter: Alex Gifford
- Producer: Alex Gifford

Music video
- "History Repeating" on YouTube

"History Repeating" is a 1997 song written by Alex Gifford and originally performed by English electronic music duo Propellerheads featuring Welsh singer Shirley Bassey. It was released shortly before their only album, Decksandrumsandrockandroll, released in 1998 by Wall of Sound in Europe and DreamWorks in the US and Japan. The single was a No. 1 hit on the UK Indie Chart, and was also Bassey's first top ten appearance on any US chart since 1973's "Never Never Never", making No. 10 on the US Dance Club Songs chart. According to Bassey, Gifford wrote the song especially for her. The sleeve cover, an illustration by Duke D. Jukes, takes its inspiration from the classic album sleeve from the Capitol 1957 release Just One of Those Things by Nat King Cole.

== Composition ==
The song is a fusion of several different styles of big beat, breakbeat and jazz combined with the vocals of Bassey. It samples from the soundtrack of the 1968 Russ Meyer film Finders Keepers, Lovers, Weepers!.

== Critical reception ==
The song received favorable reviews from music critics. Adam Webb from Daily Herald stated, "Miss Shirley Bassey's vocals keep "History Repeating" jazzy while the Propellerheads try to speed things up in the background." British magazine Music Week gave it five out of five, adding, "The next big thing? The Props certainly get hips swinging with their frantic beat and driving bass. Bassey's awesome diva vocals add the icing on the cake. Set to be massive in the wake of OHMSS." Also Brad Beatnik from their RM Dance Update rated "History Repeating" five out of five, picking it as Tune of the Week. He stated that "the Welsh wonder delivers a unique and commanding vocal over a frenetic guitar-riff, funky keys and beats groove".

A reviewer from NME wrote, "The 'Miss' is a sharp touch, the sleeve a masterpiece of retro-cool, and the whole notion something of a glam-pop wet dream in the making. Inevitably, alas, the end product isn't quite the ermine-upholstered, chandelier-hung ballroom full of champagne that it should have been. Sure, La Bassey laps up her imperious seen-it-all vocal like she's sucking down a mouthful of melted Belgian chocolate, but the Props seem too awestruck and reverential to provide anything but jaunty cha-cha-cha beats and some skittish techno-lite for afters." Sunday Mercury noted the singer's "passionate performance". Ian Hyland from Sunday Mirror gave the song eight out of ten, commenting, "Continuing their Bond obsession the 'heads enlist the not-bad vocal talents of Shirley Bassey in a corking dance-meets-diva style."

== Music video ==
The retro style of the song was also continued with the accompanying music video, directed by Pedro Romhanyi and filmed in monochrome. The video shows a performance of the song on a BBC TV jazz show called Jazz 1200 hosted by "Roger Humphries" (not to be confused with the jazz drummer Roger Humphries) and which is a reference to music shows of the 1960s such as Jazz 625. Scenes from the video shoot were included in the Divas are Forever DVD.

== Track listing ==
- European 2-track CD single
1. "History Repeating" (Knee Length Mix) – 4:03
2. "History Repeating" (Ankle Length Mix) – 5:49
- UK 3-track maxi CD single
1. "History Repeating" (Knee Length Mix) – 4:03
2. "History Repeating" (Ankle Length Mix) – 5:49
3. "History Repeating" (Hip Length Mix) – 4:14
- UK 12" vinyl single
1. "History Repeating" (Ankle Length Mix) – 5:49
2. "History Repeating" (Knee Length Mix) – 4:03
3. "History Repeating" (Hip Length Mix) – 4:14

* Track 1 only appears on side A

== Charts ==
Chart (1997–1998)	Peak position
Australia (ARIA)	55
Belgium (Ultratip Bubbling Under Flanders)	11
Europe (Eurochart Hot 100)	67
Finland (Suomen virallinen lista)	16
France (SNEP)	71
Germany (Media Control)	65
Iceland (Íslenski Listinn Topp 40)	7
Italy (FIMI)	8
Italy Airplay (Music & Media)	1
Netherlands (Dutch Top 40 Tipparade)	2
Netherlands (Single Top 100)	52
New Zealand (Recorded Music NZ)	32
Scottish Singles Sales (Official Charts)	24
UK Singles (Official Charts)	19
UK Dance (Official Charts)	5
UK Indie (Official Charts)	1
US Dance Club Play (Billboard)	10

== Personnel ==
- Shirley Bassey – vocals
- Will White and Alex Gifford – all instruments

== Cover versions ==
The song has been covered by Matt Dusk on his album Back in Town (2006), by Reax on their album No Cover (2006) and Ukrainian pop singer Jamala in 2009.

== In popular culture ==
An edit mix of the original is the theme or title music to the BBC's Later... with Jools Holland.

It featured on the original soundtrack of the film There's Something About Mary (1998), and served as the opening theme tune to the Channel 4 show So Graham Norton.

In 1999, Geri Halliwell released her debut album Schizophonic with the lead single "Look at Me", which took creative influence from this song.

In 2000, the song was used in a TV commercial for Jaguar automobiles.

In 2000, the song was used in the Daria episode "Psycho Therapy".

In 2004, the song was featured in a TV promo for Sex and the City.

In 2009, it was used in the movie It's Complicated starring Meryl Streep, Alec Baldwin, and Steve Martin.

It was used in a Pantene Pro-V shampoo commercial.

In 2010, the song by Regine Velasquez for the opening of GMA's 60th Anniversary entitled GMA @ 60: The Heart of Television.

In 2011, the song featured in Series 3 of the Television series Being Human. (Episode 7: Though the Heavens Fall).

In 2011, Jamala released her debut album For Every Heart, using the song as a bonus track.

In 2020, the song was used in the trailer for Netflix's second season promotion of The Politician.

In 2025, the song was used in the trailer for Apple TV's second season promotion of Palm Royale.
