= Steadman (band) =

British rock band

- Official Steadman logo

Background information
- Origin: Hastings, England
- Genres: Britpop, Glam rock, alternative, Psychedelic rock
- Label: None
- Members: Simon Steadman; Russel Field; David Walton; James Board; Chris Murphy
- Website: www.steadmanband.com

Steadman, formerly known as the Dharmas, were a British indie rock band. Steadman's first album, Loser Friendly, was released in the United Kingdom on lead singer Simon Steadman's own label, Freeloader Recordings. Steadman released their second album, Revive, for Elektra Records. The album was produced by Alain Johannes and Natasha Shneider.

== Personnel ==
- Simon Steadman (lead vocals and guitar)
- Russel Field (drums and vocals)
- David Walton (bass)
- James Board (guitar)
- Paul Phillips (guitar)
- Ellie Wyatt (strings and keyboard)

== History ==
Originally known as the Dharmas, the band was formed in 1998 in Hastings, England, and has been compared to Britpop bands Oasis, Suede, and Radiohead. Paul McCartney endorsed the band, stating "The band Steadman have the songs, the musicianship, the energy and the enthusiasm to blow the top off any club or arena".

When Elektra Records dissolved, the band lost their recording deal as a result.

The band has played shows with acts including Jason Mraz, Jet, Ash, Ian McCulloch of Echo & the Bunnymen, Feeder, Michelle Branch and Stereolab. Their music has been featured on The Sims 2: University ("Come On") as well as the films Love Wrecked ("Wave Goodbye"), New York Minute ("Wave Goodbye"), Failure to Launch ("Forget My Heart"), Slither ("Sad World") and According to Spencer ("Come Alive"), and has received airplay on several US radio stations.

In addition the band appeared as themselves on the TV shows Smallville, Charmed, Las Vegas, Judging Amy and Black Sash, and American Dreams as the Dave Clark Five, as well as guest spots on The Late Late Show with Craig Kilborn and The Sharon Osbourne Show. They also played a concert in a virtual world MMORPG known as There.com. The band played their songs on a stage in the There headquarters while their corresponding avatars played virtual instruments and sang in There.

Steadman released all their music as free downloads on their website under a Creative Commons licence.

=== Albums ===
Loser Friendly (1999) was the band's first album as Steadman. This album was released by Steadman's label, Freeloader Recordings. It sold approximately 6,000 copies.

Revive, released in 2003, was Steadman's debut on a major label, Elektra, and their first release in the United States. The track "Wave Goodbye" was featured in television shows, films, and soundtracks such as Smallville. "No Big Deal" was featured on Charmed.
