= Decksandrumsandrockandroll =

1998 studio album by Propellerheads

Studio album by Propellerheads
- Released: 26 January 1998
- Recorded: 1996–1997
- Genre: Big beat
- Length: 68:56
- Label: Wall of Sound
- Producer: Alex Gifford; Will White

Singles from Decksandrumsandrockandroll
- 1. "Take California" Released: 1996; 2. "Spybreak!" Released: 1997; 3. "History Repeating" Released: 1997; 4. "On Her Majesty's Secret Service" Released: 1997; 5. "Bang On!" Released: 1997

Decksandrumsandrockandroll is the only studio album by English electronic music duo Propellerheads. It was originally released by Wall of Sound on 26 January 1998 in the United Kingdom. In the United States, it was released by DreamWorks Records with a different track listing.

== Reception ==
Professional ratings
Review scores
Source	Rating
AllMusic	4/5 stars
The Austin Chronicle	4/5 stars
Entertainment Weekly	A−
The Guardian	3/5 stars
Los Angeles Times	3/4 stars
Muzik	10/10
NME	5/10
Pitchfork	7.9/10
Rolling Stone	3.5/5 stars
Spin	7/10

The album peaked at number 6 on the UK Albums Chart, and number 100 on the US Billboard 200. It was nominated for the Mercury Music Prize in 1998. As of 1999, it had sold 200,000 copies.

== Uses in media ==
The track "On Her Majesty's Secret Service" had previously been released on the 1997 album of James Bond film theme cover versions, Shaken and Stirred: The David Arnold James Bond Project.

"Take California" was selected by Apple for their iPod debut commercial in 2001. It features a man shaking his head while listening to the track on his Mac, then dragging the song onto the device including his "Favorites" playlist. He puts on his earbuds dancing to the song then leaves. It ends with the iPod wordmark and "Think different" slogan showing up.

== Track listing ==
All tracks are written by Alex Gifford, except where noted.

Original edition
No.	Title	Writer(s)	Length
1.	"Take California"		7:23
2.	"Echo and Bounce"		5:29
3.	"Velvet Pants"		5:49
4.	"Better?"	Will White	2:05
5.	"Oh Yeah?"		5:28
6.	"History Repeating" (featuring Shirley Bassey)		4:05
7.	"Winning Style"		6:00
8.	"Bang On!"		5:57
9.	"A Number of Microphones"	White	0:48
10.	"On Her Majesty's Secret Service"	John Barry	9:23
11.	"Bigger?"		2:22
12.	"Cominagetcha"		7:07
13.	"Spybreak!"		7:00
Total length:			68:56

Japanese edition bonus disc
No.	Title	Writer(s)	Length
1.	"You Want It Back" (featuring Jungle Brothers)	Jungle Brothers, Gifford	6:01
2.	"360° (Oh Yeah)" (featuring De La Soul)	De La Soul, Gifford	4:29
3.	"Go Faster"		6:12
4.	"Ron's Theory"		6:38
5.	"Dive!"		7:04
Total length:			29:24

American edition
No.	Title	Writer(s)	Length
1.	"Take California"		7:21
2.	"Velvet Pants"		5:46
3.	"Better?"	Will White	2:03
4.	"360° (Oh Yeah?)" (featuring De La Soul)	De La Soul, Gifford	4:27
5.	"History Repeating" (featuring Shirley Bassey)		4:02
6.	"Winning Style"		5:58
7.	"Bang On!"		5:44
8.	"A Number of Microphones"	White	0:45
9.	"On Her Majesty's Secret Service"	John Barry	9:20
10.	"Bigger?"		2:20
11.	"Cominagetcha"		7:02
12.	"Spybreak!"		6:58
13.	"You Want It Back" (featuring Jungle Brothers)	Jungle Brothers, Gifford	5:59
Total length:			67:45

20th Anniversary Edition bonus disc
No.	Title	Writer(s)	Length
1.	"Dive"		7:05
2.	"Ron's Theory"		6:39
3.	"Lethal Cut"		7:27
4.	"Go Faster"		6:10
5.	"Big Dog"		5:43
6.	"Clang"		5:27
7.	"Bring Us Together"		6:32
8.	"History Repeating (Ankle Length Mix)" (featuring Shirley Bassey)		5:49
9.	"History Repeating (Hip Length Mix)" (featuring Shirley Bassey)		4:14
10.	"Props Vote of Gratitude"		5:07
11.	"360˚ (Oh Yeah)" (featuring De La Soul)	De La Soul, Gifford	4:27
12.	"You Want It Back" (featuring Jungle Brothers)	Jungle Brothers, Gifford	5:59
13.	"Crash!"	Brian Fahey	6:57

== Personnel ==
Credits adapted from liner notes.

Propellerheads

- Alex Gifford – general racket, production, vocals on "Props Vote of Gratitude"
- Will White – drum set, sk8ing, additional general racket, production

Other musicians

- Shirley Bassey – vocals on "History Repeating"
- David Arnold – orchestral arrangement on "On Her Majesty's Secret Service"
- Chris Lawson – guitar on "History Repeating", "Bang On!" and "Cominagetcha"
- Mike Thomas – guitar on "Bigger?"
- Corin – additional sk8ing on "Oh Yeah?"
- De La Soul – vocals on "360° (Oh Yeah?)"
- Jungle Brothers – vocals on "You Want It Back"

Technical crew

- Mike Marsh – mastering
- Prince – engineering
- Dave Trump – engineering assistance
- Blue Source – art direction
- Lee Strickland – photography

== Charts ==
=== Weekly charts ===
Chart (1998)	Peak position
Australian Albums (ARIA)	13
Austrian Albums (Ö3 Austria)	23
Dutch Albums (Album Top 100)	29
Finnish Albums (Suomen virallinen lista)	36
French Albums (SNEP)	20
German Albums (Offizielle Top 100)	26
New Zealand Albums (RMNZ)	11
Norwegian Albums (VG-lista)	30
Swedish Albums (Sverigetopplistan)	60
UK Albums (OCC)	6
US Billboard 200	100

=== Year-end charts ===
Chart (1998)	Position
UK Albums (OCC)	99

== Certifications ==
Region	Certification	Certified units/sales
United Kingdom (BPI)	Gold	100,000
