= Raji's =

Former rock and roll nightclub in central Hollywood

Coordinates: 34°6′5.14″N 118°19′28.33″W

- Interactive map of Raji's
- Address: 6160 Hollywood Blvd. Los Angeles; USA

Raji's was a rock and roll nightclub in central Hollywood, open in the 1980s and early 1990s. It was located in the Hastings Hotel building, 6160 Hollywood Blvd. The space had previously been occupied by a Greek restaurant called The King's Palace.

Danny "Dobbs" Wilson was founder and booker of the club. He died in 2010.

The venue sustained a lightning bolt gash near the bar due to the 1994 Northridge earthquake. The club continued to operate for three months after it was red tagged. A fire marshall shut the venue down for good and Larry Mann moved his operations to Hell's Gate in the then, dangerous Yucca corridor. The building was demolished and rebuilt as a mixed-use retail/resident complex.

The Ski Room, a bar located at 5851 Sunset Blvd., a few blocks away from the club's former location, was renamed Raji's and run by the same family that ran the club in its last two years, until 2004, when it closed. It's now called The Bar.

== Legacy ==
The cover for Nirvana's 7" single "Sliver" was captured at the venue.

Some scenes from Chris Cornell's 1999 music video "Can't Change Me" were shot at the club.
