= Carry On (Chris Cornell album) =

Studio album by Chris Cornell
- Released: May 28, 2007
- Recorded: 2006–2007
- Genres: Alternative rock; adult contemporary; hard rock
- Length: 55:20
- Labels: Suretone; Interscope
- Producer: Steve Lillywhite

Chris Cornell chronology
Euphoria Mourning (1999)	Carry On (2007)	Scream (2009)

Singles from Carry On
- 1. "You Know My Name" Released: November 13, 2006; 2. "No Such Thing" Released: May 1, 2007; 3. "Arms Around Your Love" Released: May 21, 2007; 4. "She'll Never Be Your Man" Released: May 22, 2007

Professional ratings
Aggregate scores
Source	Rating
Metacritic	56/100
Review scores
Source	Rating
AllMusic	2.5/5 stars
The A.V. Club	B
Entertainment Weekly	B
IGN	7.2/10
Los Angeles Times	2.5/4 stars
PopMatters	6/10
Rolling Stone	2/5 stars
Spin	2/5 stars
The Skinny	3/5 stars
Uncut	1.5/5 stars

Carry On is the second solo studio album by American musician Chris Cornell. It was released on May 28, 2007, in the United Kingdom and June 5, 2007, in the United States. This album is Cornell's second after Euphoria Mourning in 1999, and his first since leaving his former band Audioslave. The album has sold 121,000 copies in the US.

== Production ==
=== Recording history ===
Carry On was produced by Steve Lillywhite. Among the artists who accompanied Cornell on his second solo release was friend Gary Lucas, who contributed acoustic guitar to some of the tracks. Cornell has stated that he is always writing, and that there are some songs that he was not able to put onto an Audioslave album. While recording his second solo album, Cornell was involved in a motorcycle accident. He was apparently "rear-ended by a truck in L.A.'s Studio City while riding his motorcycle" and "catapulted 20 feet into the air." He was able to walk away from the accident, but had severe cuts and bruises. He returned to the studio later that day.

=== Musical style ===
The album's style has been described as "a mash-up of alt-rock and adult contemporary." AllMusic critic Stephen Thomas Erlewine considered the album as "a hard rock maturation." Cornell stated that he took influences from a variety of genres including heavy rock on the recording of Carry On.

== Reception ==
The album debuted at number 17 on the Billboard 200, selling 37,000 copies in the United States. Carry On received generally mixed reviews from music critics. The BBC described it as "possibly the most confused album you’ll come across all year ... a collection that is both catchy and dreary at the same time." Cornell announced that "No Such Thing" would be the album's first single during interviews with various radio stations around the United States.

== Track listing ==
The album features fourteen tracks, including the first album appearance of "You Know My Name", the theme song for Casino Royale, the 2006 installment in the James Bond franchise. The album also features a cover of Michael Jackson's hit song from Thriller, "Billie Jean".

All songs written by Chris Cornell, except where noted.

No.	Title	Writer(s)	Length
1.	"No Such Thing"		3:44
2.	"Poison Eye"		3:57
3.	"Arms Around Your Love"		3:34
4.	"Safe and Sound"		4:16
5.	"She'll Never Be Your Man"		3:24
6.	"Ghosts"		3:51
7.	"Killing Birds"		3:38
8.	"Billie Jean"	Michael Jackson	4:41
9.	"Scar on the Sky"		3:40
10.	"Your Soul Today"		3:27
11.	"Finally Forever"		3:37
12.	"Silence the Voices"		4:27
13.	"Disappearing Act"		4:33
14.	"You Know My Name"	Cornell; David Arnold	4:00

Bonus tracks
No.	Title	Length
15.	"Today" (Target digital download, UK & Japanese bonus track)	3:03
16.	"Roads We Choose" (UK & Japanese bonus track)	3:51
17.	"Thank You (Live from Stockholm)" (Japanese bonus track)
18.	"Call Me a Dog (Live from Stockholm)" (Target digital download bonus track)

== Personnel ==
Personnel adapted from Carry On liner notes.

Musicians

- Chris Cornell - lead vocals (all tracks), guitar (all tracks), keyboard (track 12)
- Gary Lucas - guitar (tracks 3–14)
- Jamie Muhoberac - keyboards (tracks 2, and 5–9)
- Miles Mosley - bass guitar (tracks 1–7, 9–12, and 14), upright bass (tracks 8 and 13)
- Nir Zidkyahu - drums (all tracks)
- Cameron Greider - guitar (tracks 3–6, and 8–13)
- Brian Ray - guitar (tracks 1, 2, 7, 9, and 10)
- Dimitri Coats - guitar (tracks 2, 7, and 10)
- Steve Lillywhite - piano (track 10)
- Joe Sublett - tenor saxophone (track 4)
- Darrell Leonard - trumpet (track 4)
- Dave Cobb - horn arrangements (track 4)

Production

- Steve Lillywhite - production, mixing
- Todd Parker - recording, mixing
- David Colving - additional engineering
- Stephen Marcusson - mastering
- Cindi Peters - production coordination
- D. Sardy - mixing (track 14)
- Ryan Castle - engineering (track 14)
- Cameron Barton - additional engineering (track 14)

== Charts ==
Chart (2007)	Peak position
US Billboard 200	17
US Top Rock Albums (Billboard)	6

== Release history ==
Region	Date
United Kingdom	May 28, 2007
United States	June 5, 2007
