= Spybreak! =

- Original 12" version of the cover art

Single by Propellerheads

from the album Decksandrumsandrockandroll
- Released: 24 March 1997
- Genre: Big beat
- Length: 4:04 (Short One); 6:58 (Long One)
- Label: Wall of Sound
- Composer: Alex Gifford

Propellerheads singles chronology
"Take California" (1996)	"Spybreak!" (1997)	"On Her Majesty's Secret Service" (1997)

"Spybreak!" is a 1997 single by the British big beat group Propellerheads from their album, Decksandrumsandrockandroll, which was released in two versions; "Spybreak! (Long One)" and "Spybreak! (Short One)". The song spent one week in the UK Top 40 in May 1997.

== Usage in media ==
The song appears in the film The Matrix during the lobby shootout sequence, and was included on the film's soundtrack. This song was also in the films Playing God and Deuce Bigalow: Male Gigolo, and in the TV series Malcolm in the Middle, Third Watch, and Spaced.

== Track listing ==
- CD single 1
1. "Spybreak!" (Short One) – 4:04
2. "Clang" – 5:27
3. "Velvet Pants" – 5:43
4. "Spybreak!" (Long One) – 6:58
- CD single 2
1. "Spybreak!" (Short One) – 4:04
2. "Props Got Mo' Skills" – 2:38
3. "Take California" – 7:28
4. "Bring Us Together" (Long One) – 6:32
