= Can't Change Me =

1999 single by Chris Cornell

Single by Chris Cornell

from the album Euphoria Morning
- B-side: "Flutter Girl", "Nowhere But You"
- Released: October 1999
- Recorded: 1998
- Studio: 11 AD Studios in Los Angeles, California
- Genre: Alternative rock
- Length: 3:23
- Label: Interscope
- Songwriter: Chris Cornell
- Producers: Chris Cornell; Natasha Shneider; Alain Johannes

Chris Cornell singles chronology
"Sunshower" (1998)	"Can't Change Me" (1999)	"Preaching the End of the World" (1999)

Music video
- "Can't Change Me" on YouTube

"Can't Change Me" is the first single released from Chris Cornell's debut solo album, Euphoria Morning (1999). The song peaked at No. 5 on Billboard's Mainstream Rock Tracks chart, and at No. 7 on the Modern Rock Tracks chart. A music video was produced for the song. "Can't Change Me" was nominated for Best Male Rock Vocal Performance at the 2000 Grammy Awards.

== Origin ==
Chris Cornell told MTV News that students of Soundgarden's music can find the genesis of "Can't Change Me" in some of the band's hits, such as "Blow Up the Outside World" and "Fell on Black Days".

About the meaning of the lyrics, Cornell told MTV's Making the Video:

It was written in the middle of a long songwriting period that I had for the record. Although it's the first song released as a single, it was probably one of the later songs that I wrote. The idea of the song... you kinda get the idea that it's a statement from the singer. It's kind of more of a sad discovery that this singer is involved with this person that has amazing powers to help people and change things positively, and he's realizing that none of it is really rubbing off on him.

== Release and reception ==
"Can't Change Me" was released in 1999 and turned out to be the biggest hit from the album, achieving strong chart positions. "Can't Change Me" was the first Cornell single to chart, peaking on the Mainstream Rock Tracks chart at No. 5 and on the Modern Rock Tracks chart at No. 7. In the UK, it peaked at No. 62.

Greg Tate of Rolling Stone said "'Can't Change Me' is as rhapsodically gorgeous as pop gets, putting a spin on true love that any reprobate slacker can relate to: 'She's going to change the world/But she can't change me/Suddenly I can see everything that's wrong with me/But what can I do?/I'm the only thing I really have at all.' Cornell unveils a desire to be reckoned with as an openly wounded and unabashedly portentous rock balladeer."

== Music video ==
A music video directed by Johan Renck was produced for the song and premiered on MTV on September 6, 1999. The video's concept was Cornell's idea. It also stars Portuguese model and actress Ana Cristina de Oliveira. The video was shot in Hollywood in four days, between July 31 and August 2, 1999, in locations such as at the Raji's, the Townhouse Motel, and in the tiny mountain town of Cornell, located in the Santa Monica Mountains. The fire shots were filmed in Stockholm, Sweden on August 19, 1999. Its filming was showcased in an episode of MTV's Making the Video followed by the world premiere of the music video.

== French version ==
Cornell recorded a version of the song in French. This version is a bonus track on Euphoria Morning's deluxe version, and on the Japanese and European editions of the album released in November 1999. The song was translated to French by Alexis Lemoine.

== Track listing ==
CD1

1. "Can't Change Me" (Cornell)
2. "Flutter Girl" From the Poncier CD (Cornell)
3. "Nowhere But You" From the Poncier CD (Cornell)

CD2

1. "Can't Change Me" (Cornell)
2. "When I'm Down" Demo (Cornell)
3. "Can't Change Me" (Enhanced CD-Rom video)

== Personnel ==
Personnel adapted from Euphoria Morning liner notes.

- Chris Cornell - lead vocals, guitar, harmonica
- Alain Johannes - guitar, backing vocals
- Natasha Shneider - keyboards, tambourine
- Ric Markmann - bass guitar
- Josh Freese - drums

== Chart positions ==
Chart (1999)	Peak position
US Billboard Mainstream Rock Tracks	5
US Billboard Modern Rock Tracks	7
US Billboard Bubbling Under Hot 100 Singles	2
UK Singles Chart	62
