= Shaken and Stirred: The David Arnold James Bond Project =

1997 album by various artists

Soundtrack album by David Arnold with various artists
- Released: 20 October 1997 (UK); 2 December 1997 (US)
- Genre: Rock, electronic
- Length: 52:40
- Label: East West (UK/Japan); Sire (U.S.)
- Producer: David Arnold

David Arnold chronology
Independence Day soundtrack (1996)	Shaken and Stirred: The David Arnold James Bond Project (1997)	Tomorrow Never Dies soundtrack (1997)

Singles from Shaken and Stirred
- 1. "On Her Majesty's Secret Service" Released: 6 October 1997; 2. "Diamonds Are Forever" Released: 10 November 1997; 3. "We Have All the Time in the World" Released: 1998

Professional ratings
Review scores
Source	Rating
AllMusic	3/5 stars
Uncut	4/5 stars

Shaken and Stirred: The David Arnold James Bond Project is an album of cover versions of James Bond film themes organized and produced by David Arnold. Featuring contemporary rock and electronic artists of the time, it was compiled by Arnold in 1997 and released on East West Records in the United Kingdom and Sire Records in the United States. Following this project, Arnold would go on to compose the music for a number of Bond films.

John Barry, the composer of many of the themes on the album, was complimentary about Arnold's interpretation of his work; "He was very faithful to the melodic and harmonic content, but he's added a whole other rhythmic freshness and some interesting casting in terms of the artists chosen to do the songs. I think it's a terrific album. I'm very flattered."

A version of "You Only Live Twice" by Björk was recorded but not included on the album. It is available as a free download from bjork.com. Arnold had previously collaborated with Björk on the 1993 song "Play Dead" for the soundtrack of the film The Young Americans. The arrangement of "You Only Live Twice" was also recorded with Natacha Atlas and released in 1999 as a B-side of the single "One Brief Moment", also produced by Arnold.

The Japanese release of the album also includes an orchestral version of "The James Bond Theme", which is identified as a "Bonus track for Japan".

The album peaked at #11 in the UK Albums Chart. Two singles were released from the album in the UK: "On Her Majesty's Secret Service" featuring Propellerheads and "Diamonds Are Forever" featuring David McAlmont, which reached #7 and #39 in the UK Singles Chart respectively.

In an episode of BBC Radio 4's programme Desert Island Discs, television presenter Kevin Fong chose the Propellerheads version of "On Her Majesty's Secret Service" as one of his tracks.

== Track listings ==
International edition
No.	Title	Featuring	Length
1.	"Diamonds Are Forever"	David McAlmont	3:54
2.	"Nobody Does It Better"	Aimee Mann	4:26
3.	"Space March"	Leftfield	5:31
4.	"All Time High"	Pulp	4:33
5.	"Moonraker"	Shara Nelson	3:56
6.	"The James Bond Theme"	LTJ Bukem	7:00
7.	"Live and Let Die"	Chrissie Hynde	2:45
8.	"Thunderball"	Martin Fry	4:15
9.	"From Russia with Love"	Natacha Atlas	3:12
10.	"On Her Majesty's Secret Service"	Propellerheads	9:26
11.	"We Have All the Time in the World"	Iggy Pop	3:42

Japanese bonus track
No.	Title	Length
12.	"The James Bond Theme" (orchestral)	3:30

"On Her Majesty's Secret Service" (CD/12″/cassette single)
No.	Title	Length
1.	"On Her Majesty's Secret Service" (edit)	3:26
2.	"On Her Majesty's Secret Service"	9:26
3.	"On Her Majesty's Secret Service" (orchapella)	5:38

"Diamonds Are Forever" (CD single)
No.	Title	Length
1.	"Diamonds Are Forever" (radio edit)	3:51
2.	"Diamonds Are Forever" (You Expect Me to Do What Mr Goldfinger? mix (Note: Remixed by Shape Navigator. Ambience controlled by DJ Jess.))	6:20
3.	"The James Bond Theme" (orchestral)	3:30
4.	"Diamonds Are Forever" (orchapella)	3:39

"Diamonds Are Forever" (12″ single)
No.	Title	Length
1.	"Diamonds Are Forever" (Trailermen club vocal)	8:40
2.	"Diamonds Are Forever" (radio mix)	3:51
3.	"Diamonds Are Forever" (Trailermen Deep Funk dub)	7:58
4.	"Diamonds Are Forever" (Trailermen Deeper Funk dub)	8:56

== See also ==
- Outline of James Bond
