= Propellerheads =

English electronic music duo

- Origin: Bath, Somerset, England
- Genres: Big beat, breakbeat
- Years active: 1995–2003
- Label: Wall of Sound
- Members: Will White; Alex Gifford

Propellerheads were an English electronic music duo, formed in 1995 in Bath by Will White and Alex Gifford.

== History ==
Prior to Propellerheads' formation, Alex Gifford played as a backing saxophonist for The Stranglers appearing on the albums Dreamtime (1986) and 10 (1990) as well as the live album All Live and All of the Night (1988).

Their first release was an EP named Dive!, released in 1996 through the independent label Wall of Sound. They gained fame the next year by providing a remix for James Bond movie composer David Arnold's Bond tribute album Shaken & Stirred: The David Arnold James Bond Project covering John Barry's "On Her Majesty's Secret Service", the theme song to the sixth James Bond film, re-orchestrated by Arnold. They also collaborated with Arnold on the track "Backseat Driver" for the soundtrack of the Bond film Tomorrow Never Dies. The single "History Repeating" followed, a collaboration with Shirley Bassey (also well known for her James Bond music), fusing big beat with jazz.

The Propellerheads album Decksandrumsandrockandroll was released in 1998 by Wall of Sound in Europe and DreamWorks in the US and Japan. The DreamWorks versions include collaborations with hip-hop artists De La Soul and Jungle Brothers, and the Japanese version is a two disc special edition including some of their earlier singles. A track from the album, "Spybreak!", became widely known after its use in the lobby scene in the 1999 feature film The Matrix. They are also noted for providing "Crash" (a remixed cover version of Brass Incorporated's "At the Sign of the Swinging Cymbal", perhaps best known as the theme song of BBC Radio 1's Pick of the Pops) as the theme tune to Radio 1's 'Official Chart Show' between 1998 and 2002, when Mark Goodier was the host. This song was also used in the 1999 hit comedy film Austin Powers: The Spy Who Shagged Me.

After touring for their hit album, White fell ill. They released Extended Play EP in 1998, and in the song "Props' Vote of Gratitude", Alex Gifford raps for the first time, explaining to the listener that the band would "be back after this short break". Gifford moved to New York and produced the Jungle Brothers' 1999 album V.I.P., in which he raps with The Black Eyed Peas among others. White provided the drums for the eponymous track. He has also produced "Shadows", a track for Rufus Wainwright on his 2001 album Poses. White has since released a mix compilation for the Beatz and Bobz series, and he has also appeared as a member of the De-Fex music project.

In November 1998, the song "Bang On!" was included in the Nintendo 64 video game Wipeout 64. Earlier that same year, the same song was also featured on the Lost in Space soundtrack. "Bang On!" would later be featured in the 2001 Xbox video game Mad Dash Racing as part of the game console's launch into the American market. Another song "Lethal Cut" was featured in the PlayStation game Wipeout 3, while "Big Dog" was featured in the background music of the PAL version of Gran Turismo 2.

Following their 1997 collaboration, in 2000, Propellerheads again worked with Shirley Bassey, this time remixing her 1964 song "Goldfinger". This version was included on Bassey's remix album, Diamonds Are Forever.

In 2001, the band recorded "Star Crossed Lovers" with Martha Wainwright for the Red Hot Organization's compilation album Red Hot + Indigo, a tribute to Duke Ellington, which raised money for various charities devoted to increasing AIDS awareness and fighting the disease.

In October 2003, Wall of Sound celebrated its tenth birthday. To commemorate the occasion, the label released a two-disc album charting ten years of its pioneering British music. The first CD featured Röyksopp, The Wiseguys and Mekon, while Gifford provided a mix CD for the second disc. The first track on that disc, "Ten Years (Johnston's Strut, Part 1)", was a new song by Propellerheads featuring the Brooklyn-based writer Livingroom Johnston.

One of the trailers for the Disney/Pixar film The Incredibles featured "On Her Majesty's Secret Service".

Their version of "On Her Majesty's Secret Service" featured as a choice of Horizon presenter Kevin Fong on Desert Island Discs, as this was the track he played every morning when driving to the Kennedy Space Center while working with NASA.

White was part of the live incarnation of Long Range, the now-defunct project of Phil Hartnoll of Orbital.

== Discography ==
=== Studio album ===
Title	Album details	Peak chart positions										Certifications
Title	Album details	UK	AUS	CAN	EUR	FIN	FRA	GER	NLD	NZ	US	Certifications
Decksandrumsandrockandroll	Released: 26 January 1998; Label: Wall of Sound (WALL015); Formats: LP, CS, CD, MD	6	13	56	18	36	20	26	29	11	100	BPI: Gold; ARIA: Gold

=== EPs ===
Year	Title	Tracks	Peak chart positions					
Year	Title	Tracks	UK	AUS	FRA	HUN	ITA	NZ
1996	Dive	Dive!; Ron’s Theory; Lethal Cut; Go Faster	—	—	—	—	—	—
1997	Propellerheads	Bang On!; Spybreak! (Long One); Clang; Props Got Mo' Skills; Bring Us Together	—	—	—	—	—	—
1998	Extended Play	Crash! (Edit); Props Vote Of Gratitude; You Want It Back; 360° (Oh Yeah)	184	41	77	1	11	8
"—" denotes items that did not chart or were not released in that territory.

=== Singles ===
Year	Title	Peak chart positions										Album
Year	Title	UK	AUS	EUR	FIN	FRA	GER	NLD	NZ	SCO	US Dance	Album
1996	"Take California"	69	—	—	—	—	—	—	—	—	—	Decksandrumsandrockandroll
1997	"Spybreak!"	40	—	—	—	—	—	—	—	47	—	Decksandrumsandrockandroll
1997	"On Her Majesty's Secret Service" (with David Arnold)	7	—	73	—	—	—	—	—	8	—	Decksandrumsandrockandroll
1997	"Bang On!"/"Dive"	86	—	—	—	—	—	—	—	—	—	Decksandrumsandrockandroll
1997	"History Repeating" (featuring Shirley Bassey)	19	55	67	16	71	65	52	32	24	10	Decksandrumsandrockandroll
1998	"Bang On!"	53	—	—	—	—	—	—	—	56	—	Decksandrumsandrockandroll
1998	"Velvet Pants"	—	—	—	—	—	—	—	—	—	—	Decksandrumsandrockandroll
1999	"Take California and Party"	—	—	—	—	—	—	—	—	—	—	Non-album singles
1999	"Lethal Cut"	—	—	—	—	—	—	—	—	—	—	Non-album singles
2004	"Take California" (remix)	154	—	—	—	—	—	—	—	—	—	Non-album singles
"—" denotes items that did not chart or were not released in that territory.

=== Other appearances ===
List of guest appearances, showing year released and album name
Title	Year	Artist	Album
"On Her Majesty's Secret Service"	1997	Various Artists	Shaken and Stirred: The David Arnold James Bond Project
"Lopez (Hard On)" (A Progressive Mix By The Propellerheads) (808 State)	1998	808 State	"Lopez" single
"Goldfinger" (Propellerheads Mix) (Shirley Bassey)	2000	Shirley Bassey	The Remix Album...Diamonds Are Forever
"Star Crossed Lovers" (Propellerheads + Martha Wainwright)	2001	Various Artists	Red Hot + Indigo
"Ten Years (Johnston's Strut Part 1)"	2003	Various Artists	Off The Wall (10 Years Of Wall Of Sound)
