= On Her Majesty's Secret Service (soundtrack) =

- Album cover art by Terence Gilbert

Soundtrack album by John Barry
- Released: 1969
- Recorded: October 1969
- Label: EMI
- Producer: Phil Ramone

John Barry chronology
The Lion in Winter (1968)	On Her Majesty's Secret Service (1969)	Diamonds Are Forever (1971)

Singles from On Her Majesty's Secret Service
- 1. "We Have All the Time in the World" Released: 1969

Professional ratings
Review scores
Source	Rating
AllMusic	5/5 stars

On Her Majesty's Secret Service ("OHMSS") is the 1969 soundtrack for the James Bond film. It was composed, arranged, and conducted by John Barry; his fifth in the series.

== Opening theme ==
The opening theme for On Her Majesty's Secret Service proved challenging for composer John Barry. The convention in the previous James Bond films was to accompany the opening credits with a song whose lyrics included the film's title. This film became the first in the series since From Russia with Love to deviate from this rule (and From Russia with Love had differed only in featuring the song, sung by Matt Monro, at the end of the film rather than the beginning).

Barry felt it would be difficult to compose a theme song containing the title "On Her Majesty's Secret Service" unless it was written operatically, in the style of Gilbert and Sullivan. Leslie Bricusse had considered lyrics for the title song but director Peter R. Hunt allowed an instrumental opening title theme in the tradition of the first two Bond films Dr. No and From Russia with Love.

The track is also notable for its use of the Moog synthesizer in its bassline. This instrument's distinctive sound would become a mainstay of other film soundtracks in the 1970s.

The opening theme, "On Her Majesty's Secret Service", also serves as an action theme alternate to Monty Norman's "James Bond Theme" - a piece of music which makes its last appearance in this film. Barry's arrangement of Norman's "James Bond Theme", first used in Dr. No in 1962, had been used throughout Sean Connery's tenure as James Bond from 1962 to 1967, but since "On Her Majesty's Secret Service", the theme has been incorporated as a melody within each film's score, rather than as a standalone piece.

"On Her Majesty's Secret Service" was remixed in 1997 by the Propellerheads for the David Arnold compilation Shaken and Stirred: The David Arnold James Bond Project.

Nic Raine, Barry's orchestrator, created an arrangement of the "Escape from Piz Gloria" sequence that was featured in a teaser trailer for Pixar's 2004 animated film The Incredibles. Notably, the performance of the piece used in the trailer was conducted by John Barry himself. (Barry had been asked to write the score for The Incredibles, but declined as he did not want to duplicate his older work.)

The soundtrack of the 2021 James Bond film No Time to Die contains references to two tracks from this soundtrack:

- "We Have All the Time in the World" (featured in "Matera");
- "On Her Majesty's Secret Service (Main Title)" (featured in "Good to Have You Back").

The soundtrack of the 2026 James Bond video game 007 First Light contains reference to a track from this soundtrack: "On Her Majesty's Secret Service (Main Title)" (featured in "Bigger is Better").

== Songs ==
Barry also composed the love song "We Have All the Time in the World" sung by Louis Armstrong, with lyrics by Hal David, Burt Bacharach's regular lyricist. "We Have All the Time in the World" is often mistakenly referred to as the opening credits theme, when in fact the song is played within the film, during the James Bond (George Lazenby)–Tracy di Vicenzo (Diana Rigg) courtship montage, bridging Marc-Ange Draco (Gabriele Ferzetti)'s birthday party in Portugal and Bond's burglary of Gebrüder Gumbold's (James Bree) law office in Bern, Switzerland. It is also heard during the short scene where Bond is in his office clearing his desk having just offered his resignation - also included in this musical cue are elements of "Under the Mango Tree" from Dr. No, the instrumental version of "From Russia with Love", and "Thunderball". "We Have All the Time in the World" was Armstrong's last recorded song (he died of a heart attack two years later), and at the time of release it barely made an impact on the charts.

Barry and David also wrote two other songs for the film, both performed by Danish singer Nina. One, entitled "Do You Know How Christmas Trees Are Grown?", is featured in the film in several scenes. The other, "The More Things Change", was recorded by Nina at the same session, but did not end up in the finished film. Instead, it appears as the b-side of the UK single of "Do You Know How Christmas Trees Are Grown?" and an instrumental version of it appears on John Barry's 1970 LP Ready When You Are J.B.

== Track listing ==
Tracks 1–11 represent the original 1969 album presentation.

1. "We Have All the Time in the World" – Louis Armstrong
2. "This Never Happened to the Other Feller" (Note: contains the "James Bond Theme", originally composed for the Dr. No soundtrack)
3. "Try"
4. "Ski Chase"
5. "Do You Know How Christmas Trees Are Grown?" – Nina
6. "On Her Majesty's Secret Service (Main Title)"
7. "Journey to Blofeld's Hideaway"
8. "We Have All the Time in the World (Instrumental)"
9. "Over and Out"
10. "Battle at Piz Gloria"
11. "We Have All the Time in the World – James Bond Theme"
12. "Journey to Draco's Hideaway"
13. "Bond and Draco"
14. "Gumbold's Safe"
15. "Bond Settles In"
16. "Bond Meets the Girls"
17. "Dusk at Piz Gloria"
18. "Sir Hilary's Night Out (Who Will Buy My Yesterdays?)"
19. "Blofeld's Plot"
20. "Escape from Piz Gloria"
21. "Bobsled Chase"

In 2003, the soundtrack was digitally remastered and re-released with additional tracks (tracks 12 to 21); the liner notes state that these additional tracks contain "previously unreleased music within cue". For legal reasons, the additional tracks were placed after the tracks making up the original soundtrack. In both the original soundtrack and its re-release, the tracks are not in the order in which they occur in the film.

== Track listing (in chronological order, as they appear in the film for the 2003 release) ==
1. "This Never Happened to the Other Feller"
2. "On Her Majesty's Secret Service (Main Title)"
3. "Try"
4. "Journey to Draco's Hideaway"
5. Bond and Draco
6. "We Have All the Time in the World" – Louis Armstrong
7. "Gumbold's Safe"
8. "Do You Know How Christmas Trees Are Grown?" – Nina
9. "Journey to Blofeld's Hideaway"
10. "Bond Settles In"
11. "Bond Meets the Girls"
12. "Sir Hilary's Night Out (Who Will Buy My Yesterdays?)"
13. "Blofeld's Plot"
14. "Escape from Piz Gloria"
15. "Ski Chase"
16. "Over and Out"
17. "Battle at Piz Gloria" (Note: The first half of this piece is not used in the film. Instead, the original arrangement of the "James Bond Theme" from Dr. No, plays instead)
18. "Bobsled Chase"
19. "We Have All the Time in the World – James Bond Theme"
20. "We Have All the Time in the World (Instrumental)" (Note: Not used in the film)
21. "Dusk at Piz Gloria"

== 2025 La-La Land Expanded Release Track Listing ==
DISC 1 SCORE PRESENTATION 1:28:18

1. Gun Barrel (From “On Her Majesty’s Secret Service”) 0:30 (Note: contains the "James Bond Theme", originally composed for the Dr. No soundtrack)
2. This Never Happened To The Other Fella (Film Version) 4:42
3. Main Title: On Her Majesty's Secret Service (Film Version) 2:43
4. We Have All The Time In The World (Film Version) 2:50
5. Try (Film Version) 3:10
6. James And Tracy 2:07
7. You Have An Appointment 1:36
8. The Capu 3:25
9. Resignation 1:02
10. Two Weeks Leave 1:11
11. Prelude For Guitar And Strings 3:20
12. We Have All The Time In The World (Film Mix) (Performed by Louis Armstrong) 3:14
13. Gumbold's Safe 5:33
14. The College Of Arms 0:47
15. Journey To Piz Gloria 4:52
16. The Usual Comforts 1:31
17. Twelve Gorgeous Girls 0:35
18. Heraldry 1:56
19. Count Balthazar de Bleuchamp 1:18
20. Eight 2:32
21. It's True! / The Hidden Persuader / You'll Need To Be 3:34
22. Uncovered 1:25
23. I'll Do What I Claim 1:09
24. Deep Hypnosis 6:35
25. Escape From Piz Gloria 4:52
26. Blizzard 1:04
27. Proposal 3:45
28. Ski Chase (Extended Version) 3:47

TOTAL DISC 1 TIME: 1:15:51

DISC 2 SCORE PRESENTATION CONTINUED

1. Don't Be So Proud 0:42
2. Over And Out (Film Version) 3:11
3. Battle At Piz Gloria 4:03
4. Bobsled Chase 2:07
5. The Wedding Ring 0:40
6. We Have All The Time In The World – James Bond Theme (Film Version) 1:34

ORIGINAL 1969 SOUNDTRACK ALBUM 38:04

1. We Have All The Time In The World (Performed by Louis Armstrong) 3:14
2. This Never Happened To The Other Fella 4:28
3. Try 3:26
4. Ski Chase 2:53
5. Do You Know How Christmas Trees Are Grown? (Performed By Nina) 3:20
6. Main Title: On Her Majesty's Secret Service 2:35
7. Journey To Blofeld's Hideaway 3:28
8. We Have All The Time In The World 2:59
9. Over And Out 2:40
10. Battle At Piz Gloria 4:03
11. We Have All The Time In The World – James Bond Theme 4:34

ADDITIONAL MUSIC 25:09

1. We Have All The Time In The World (Unused Film Version) (Performed by Louis Armstrong) 2:15
2. Journey To Blofeld's Hideaway (Unused Album Version) 4:06
3. Do You Know How Christmas Trees Are Grown? (Wild Instrumental) 1:11
4. Deep Hypnosis (With Full Overlay) 6:35
5. Escape From Piz Gloria (Mono Stem, Film Take) 3:50
6. Grand Christmas Eve Ball 2:55
7. Tracy To The Rescue (Mono Stem) 1:29
8. We Have All The Time In The World (Unused Album Version) 2:37

TOTAL DISC 2 TIME: 1:15:55 TOTAL ALBUM TIME: 2:31:46

"A" contains the "James Bond Theme", originally composed for the Dr. No soundtrack

== See also ==
- Outline of James Bond
