= Awake in a Dream (album) =

Studio album by Eleven
- Released: 1991
- Genre: Hard rock
- Length: 49:48
- Label: Morgan Creek
- Producers: E.T. Thorngren, Eleven

Eleven chronology
Awake in a Dream (1991)	Eleven (1993)

Awake in a Dream is the debut album by the American hard rock band Eleven, released in 1991 on Morgan Creek Records. Singles from the album include "Break the Spell" (which was featured in the film Freejack) and "Rainbow's End", which had a music video released. A promotional EP titled Vowel Movement was also released, featuring alternate mixes of four songs on the album. The album is named for a line in the song "Learning to Be".

== Critical reception ==
Professional ratings
Review scores
Source	Rating
AllMusic	3/5 stars
Chicago Tribune	3/4 stars

The Chicago Tribune noted that, "with Jack Irons' fat beat leading the way, the hooks don't just please, they pummel, recalling a weird hybrid of early XTC and '70s Stevie Wonder." The Los Angeles Times determined that "the music strives for the heaviness of Led Zeppelin while [Alain] Johannes sings in an aggressive John Lennon-like style."

AllMusic wrote: "Not earth-shattering but usually decent, this little-known CD indicated that Eleven was a band to keep an eye on, even if commercial success eluded them."

== Track listing ==
1. "All Together" (3:45) (Johannes/Shneider)
2. "Break the Spell" (2:14) (Johannes/Shneider)
3. "Learning to Be" (4:00) (Johannes/Shneider)
4. "Rainbow's End" (4:43) (Johannes/Shneider/Irons)
5. "Before Your Eyes" (5:15) (Johannes/Shneider/Irons)
6. "Burning Your Bed" (4:26) (Johannes/Shneider)
7. "Flying" (5:24) (Johannes/Shneider/Irons)
8. "I Wanna See No Back" (3:46) (Johannes/Shneider)
9. "You Are Mine" (4:18) (Johannes/Shneider)
10. "Water and Power" (3:15) (Johannes/Shneider)
11. "Down" (3:16) (Johannes/Shneider/Irons)
12. "Message to You" (5:00) (Johannes)

== Personnel ==
- Alain Johannes: guitars, vocals
- Natasha Shneider: piano, organ, clavinet, keyboard bass, vocals
- Jack Irons: drums
- Engineered at Track Record in North Hollywood, CA, by E.T. Thorngren, assisted by Ken Paulakovich
- Mixed at Aire LA in Glendale, CA, by E.T. Thorngren, assisted by Rob Seifert
- Design & art direction: Kosh for Kosh Brooks Design
