= Osymyso =

British musician and DJ

Osymyso (real name Mark Nicholson) is a musician and DJ from the United Kingdom who specialises in the genres of mashup / bastard pop and breakbeat. He has been making music since 1994 and released his first album, Welcome to the Pailindrome, in 1999. Songs which he has created include "Pat n Peg", which turns an argument between two EastEnders characters into a track through the looping of the shouts You bitch! and You cow! and the addition of a hip hop beat, and "Intro-Inspection". In a 2002 front page survey of the genre, The New York Times remarked on "Intro-Inspection" and called Osymyso "one of the most popular bootleg artists".

== Career ==
Osymyso uses Cubase and WaveLab on a PC to make music. In interviews, Osymyso has indicated that it takes him a week to make a track that contains no samples, but that he can compose a bootleg track in a matter of hours.

In 2005, Osymyso set himself the task of releasing one short track every week for 50 weeks, a project he called 05ymy50. However, progress was slower than hoped, and by year's end only 15 tracks had been completed. Despite this, Osymyso felt the project was at least a partial success: some of the tracks have been released on vinyl by Juno Records, and Osymyso has indicated that he may eventually finish the project.

He provided a track called "Spaced Jam" for the 2004 reissue of the complete Spaced TV series with Simon Pegg and Edgar Wright, which samples dialogue from the show over a dance beat. He also produced the soundtrack album for the pair's 2004 film Shaun of the Dead, and was responsible for a track on the 2007 soundtrack to Hot Fuzz. Osymyso also provided seven "trailer remixes" for Edgar Wright's movie Scott Pilgrim vs. the World. Pegg also contributed percussion parts for the 05ymy50 project.

Osymyso has remixed Chris Morris' George W. Bush cut-up "Bushwacked 2" and Morris' short film My Wrongs 8245-8249 and 117, which is available on the DVD release.

He most notably created a "Birthday Mix" of Placebo's hit "Twenty Years" appears on the CD format of the single. 2009 saw Osymyso produce a 60-minute remix for Warp Records for their 20th Anniversary box set.

Osymyso produced a mix for the Mary Ann Hobbs' The Breezeblock BBC Radio One show.

== "Intro-Inspection" ==
"Intro-Inspection" is a bastard pop song by Osymyso. It sets itself apart from other songs of its genre by putting together the intros to one hundred different, well-known songs—all by different artists—into a twelve-minute long song.

"Intro-Inspection" was never officially released, although there was a very limited number of CDs and vinyl copies printed. It therefore never entered any official chart.

=== List of samples used for Intro-Inspection ===
1. "Rivers of Babylon" – Boney M
2. "Wild Thing" – The Troggs
3. "Hello" – Lionel Richie
4. "Fairground" – Simply Red
5. "Hey Jude" – The Beatles
6. "Vienna" – Ultravox
7. "Unchained Melody" – The Righteous Brothers
8. "Bela Lugosi's Dead" – Bauhaus
9. "I Get Around" – The Beach Boys
10. "Tainted Love" – Soft Cell
11. "Bohemian Rhapsody" – Queen
12. "No Woman, No Cry" – Bob Marley
13. "Hound Dog" – Elvis Presley
14. "Drinking in L.A." – Bran Van 3000
15. "99 Luftballons" – Nena
16. "The Lovecats" – The Cure
17. "...Baby One More Time" – Britney Spears
18. "Walk on the Wild Side" – Lou Reed
19. "Can't Get Enough of Your Love, Babe" – Barry White
20. "True" – Spandau Ballet
21. "Leader of the Pack" – The Shangri-Las
22. "The Message" – Grandmaster Flash
23. "Wannabe" – Spice Girls
24. "Pure Shores" – All Saints
25. "Eye of the Tiger" – Survivor
26. "Only You" – Flying Pickets
27. "Need You Tonight" – INXS
28. "Come on Eileen" – Dexys Midnight Runners
29. "Praise You" – Fatboy Slim
30. "Down Under" – Men at Work
31. "Pump up the Volume" – MARRS
32. "I Heard It Through the Grapevine" – Marvin Gaye
33. "Relax" – Frankie Goes to Hollywood
34. "3 a.m. Eternal" – The KLF
35. "I Should Be So Lucky" – Kylie Minogue
36. "Don't You Want Me" – The Human League
37. "I Will Always Love You" – Whitney Houston
38. "I Will Survive" – Gloria Gaynor
39. "Theme from Shaft" – Isaac Hayes
40. "The Pink Panther Theme" – Henry Mancini
41. "Is There Something I Should Know?" – Duran Duran
42. "Groove Is in the Heart" – Deee-Lite
43. "Sweet Dreams (Are Made of This)" – Eurythmics
44. "Oh Yeah" – Yello
45. "Song 2" – Blur
46. "Blue Monday" – New Order
47. "Baggy Trousers" – Madness
48. "You Really Got Me" – The Kinks
49. "Sweet Child o' Mine" – Guns N' Roses
50. "Wipe Out" – The Surfaris
51. "Pretty Fly (for a White Guy)" – The Offspring
52. "Firestarter" – The Prodigy
53. "Barbie Girl" – Aqua
54. "I'm a Believer" – The Monkees
55. "Anarchy in the U.K." – Sex Pistols
56. "I've Never Been to Me" – Charlene Duncan
57. "(I Can't Get No) Satisfaction" – The Rolling Stones
58. "Disco 2000" – Pulp
59. "Everybody's Free (To Wear Sunscreen)" – Baz Luhrmann
60. "Disco Inferno" – The Trammps
61. "Like a Prayer" – Madonna
62. "China in Your Hand" – T'Pau
63. "Just Can't Get Enough" – Depeche Mode
64. "Music Sounds Better with You" – Stardust
65. "My Name Is" – Eminem
66. "Shout" – Lulu
67. "I Feel for You" – Chaka Khan
68. "Take a Chance on Me" – ABBA
69. "The Power of Love" – Huey Lewis and the News
70. "Killer" – Adamski
71. "Bad" – Michael Jackson
72. "Always Look on the Bright Side of Life" – Eric Idle
73. "Tom's Diner" – Suzanne Vega
74. "West End Girls" – Pet Shop Boys
75. "Oh, Pretty Woman" – Roy Orbison
76. "I Just Called to Say I Love You" – Stevie Wonder
77. "Let's Dance" – David Bowie
78. "All Right Now" – Free
79. "Smells Like Teen Spirit" – Nirvana
80. "Stayin' Alive" – Bee Gees
81. "Israelites" – Desmond Dekker
82. "The Power" – Snap!
83. "The Safety Dance" – Men Without Hats
84. "I Just Wanna Make Love to You" – Etta James
85. "Lust for Life" – Iggy Pop
86. "My Generation" – The Who
87. "Take My Breath Away" – Berlin
88. "Red Red Wine" – UB40
89. "These Boots Are Made for Walkin'" – Nancy Sinatra
90. "It's Not Unusual" – Tom Jones
91. "Johnny B. Goode" – Chuck Berry
92. "Bring It All Back" – S Club 7
93. "A Whiter Shade of Pale" – Procol Harum
94. "He Ain't Heavy, He's My Brother" – The Hollies
95. "Imagine" – John Lennon
96. "Turn On, Tune In, Cop Out" – Freak Power
97. "Little Fluffy Clouds" – The Orb
98. "Total Eclipse of the Heart" – Bonnie Tyler
99. "I'm Not in Love" – 10cc
100. "Temptation" – Heaven 17
101. "My Way" – Frank Sinatra
102. "Albatross" – Fleetwood Mac
103. "The End" – The Doors

== Sources ==
- Neil Strauss, "Spreading by the Web, Pop's Bootleg Remix", New York Times, 9 May 2002, Pg. A1.
