= No Such Thing (Chris Cornell song) =

Single by Chris Cornell

from the album Carry On
- Released: May 1, 2007
- Recorded: 2006–2007
- Genre: Post-grunge
- Length: 3:44
- Label: Interscope
- Songwriter: Chris Cornell
- Producer: Steve Lillywhite

Chris Cornell singles chronology
"You Know My Name" (2006)	"No Such Thing" (2007)	"Arms Around Your Love" (2007)

"No Such Thing" is the second single from Chris Cornell's second solo album, Carry On. The song is heavy in tone with a straightforward riff and chorus.

== Release and Reception ==
"No Such Thing" was released in the summer of 2007 and became the second single from Carry On to chart in the US, the first single that charted from the album was "You Know My Name". "No Such Thing" peaked on the mainstream rock tracks at 33.

Chris Long from the BBC said that "Stuck somewhere between Cornell’s initial incarnation in Soundgarden and a curious entry to American Idol, it is a collection that is both catchy and dreary at the same time, shown perfectly in the opening trio of No Such Thing’s grown-up grunge."

Leah Greenblatt of Entertainment Weekly said "After a decent but ultimately underwhelming run with Audioslave, that now-vintage Cornell is back on No Such Thing, the incendiary opener of Carry On, his second solo release. And then...it goes away again. There is nothing wrong with a calmer, mellower Chris — after all, he's now a sober, fortysomething dad. But it's hard not to pine for the old fire".

== Music video ==
The video is rather dark and showcases very brutal encounters between youngsters.

The music video was released to the internet in May. The video shows Chris along with his sessions musician. At the start of the film the viewer sees different people attacking each other. As the violence progress a girl is killed. Chris then takes her body to a cliff where he flings her. At the end of the video Cornell and the other musicians are shown playing outside the house.

== Live performances ==
An acoustic version of the song has been performed live at various live concerts. The song was first performed live in the US in March. The film is available on YouTube.

== Charts ==
Chart (2007)	Peak position
U.S. Billboard Hot Mainstream Rock Tracks	33
