= You Know My Name =

Single by Chris Cornell

from the album Carry On
- B-side: "Black Hole Sun" (acoustic)
- Released: November 13, 2006
- Recorded: 2006
- Studio: AIR, London
- Genre: Alternative rock; hard rock
- Length: 4:02
- Label: Interscope
- Songwriters: Chris Cornell; David Arnold
- Producers: Chris Cornell; David Arnold

Chris Cornell singles chronology
"Preaching the End of the World" (1999)	"You Know My Name" (2006)	"No Such Thing" (2007)

James Bond theme singles chronology
"Die Another Day" (2002)	"You Know My Name" (2006)	"Another Way to Die" (2008)

Music video
- "You Know My Name" on YouTube

"You Know My Name" is the theme song of the 2006 James Bond film Casino Royale, performed by American musician Chris Cornell, who wrote and produced it jointly with David Arnold, the film's composer. The track was leaked onto the internet on September 20, 2006, and later released as an official single on November 13, 2006 through Interscope Records. It was not included in the Casino Royale soundtrack, but appeared on Cornell's 2007 second solo album, Carry On.

The film producers chose Cornell because they wanted a strong male singer. Cornell and Arnold tried to make the song a replacement theme for the character instead of the "James Bond Theme" reflecting the agent's inexperience in Casino Royale, as well as an introduction to Daniel Craig's grittier and more emotional portrayal of James Bond.

It was a hit throughout Europe, reaching the top 10 in eight countries, including No. 7 on the UK Singles Chart. It sold 148,000 copies in 2006 in the UK, and has sold 323,000 digital copies and garnered 3.5 million streams in the U.S. as of 2017. Reviews of the song were positive; it won a Satellite Award for Best Original Song and a World Soundtrack Award for Best Original Song Written Directly for a Film and was nominated for a Grammy Award for Best Song Written for a Motion Picture, Television or Other Visual Media.

== Composition and recording ==
"You Know My Name"
A 24-second sample of "You Know My Name". The song mixes "rock aggression and sophisticated instrumentation".

Lia Vollack, Sony Pictures's President of Music, called Chris Cornell inviting him to make a song for the new Bond movie Casino Royale, which would "reflect the dramatic new direction of James Bond", with a "strong male singer". Cornell thought it was a strange offer, considering that he was American, and assumed he would perform a secondary song instead of the main theme. Cornell declared he liked the Bond movies, particularly the ones with Sean Connery, but that he "wasn't really a big fan of the last several movies". But Daniel Craig's casting as James Bond intrigued him, and he decided to accept. He then went to Prague to visit the film's shooting location, and was impressed with its emotional content when he was shown a rough cut. In Prague he also met the film's composer, David Arnold, who suggested writing a song "that echoed the film score".

The composers started their writing separately, Cornell in his apartment in Paris, and Arnold in his house in London. Cornell said, "It is difficult, I think, to write lyrics for a character, so really I just kind of wandered around for about a month not thinking about it too much, until I sort of formulated some idea of a way that I could approach it, where I'm kind of relating to what's in the character in the movie. And because this particular Bond is very edgy, but also has a lot of emotional depth, it's a lot easier." Later the two musicians met to share their ideas, and according to Arnold "it was almost like we wrote two parts of the same song." Cornell wrote lyrics, to which Arnold added some more lyrics and later music. Some of Arnold's ideas included the song's title, the heavy introduction, and "having the same genetic material as the "James Bond Theme", but in a different order and in a different shape".

After a demo of the song was approved by the film's producers, both musicians recorded the full version in AIR Studios in London. Cornell and Arnold recorded the guitar and bass parts themselves and hired a session musician for the drums. They were finished by the time Casino Royale wrapped its principal photography on July 21, 2006, and Arnold played it at the wrap party. Afterwards he mixed in the orchestral parts.

Speaking to the film music fan site Maintitles, Arnold said he wanted "You Know My Name" to be a substitute for the "James Bond Theme", to represent Bond's immaturity. The song's motif is heard throughout the film, and the classic theme plays only during the end credits to signal the end of his character arc. Arnold felt the song should tie closer to the score, and have the "DNA of the James Bond music". The musical arrangement tried to create "the right blend of rock aggression and sophisticated instrumentation", with Cornell describing it as "more up-tempo and a little more aggressive than any other Bond theme has been, maybe since Paul McCartney's 'Live and Let Die'."

"I (wanted) an orchestra. I didn't want to do a song for a James Bond film and not have it sound somewhat like a James Bond song."

— Chris Cornell

Cornell stated that the biggest two influences on "You Know My Name" were Tom Jones, who performed the theme for Thunderball, and Paul McCartney, who composed and performed the theme for Live and Let Die with his band Wings. "I decided that I was going to sing it like Tom Jones, in that crooning style. I wanted people to hear my voice," Cornell said. "And 'Live and Let Die' is a fantastic song. Paul McCartney wouldn't have written it if not for that movie. I [also] wanted to write a song in its own universe. I knew I'd never have it again — a big orchestra — so I wanted to have fun with it." Cornell did not put the film's title in the lyrics, because he "couldn't imagine it fitting into a song lyric that would come out of my mouth". And he jokingly stated "Casino Royale didn't make a good rock title, but I would write a song named Octopussy just for fun".

Before producers Michael G. Wilson and Barbara Broccoli announced on July 26, 2006 that Cornell was performing the theme for Casino Royale, various names were reported in the media, including some reports that other performers claimed they were working on the song. Some names mentioned were Tina Turner, who previously sang "GoldenEye" for the 1995 Bond film of the same name, and Tony Christie.

The lyrics try to illustrate Bond's psyche in Casino Royale, described by Cornell as a conflicted and tough spy with more emotional depth, not the "superconfident, seemingly invincible, winking kinda ladies' man superspy" of the previous incarnations. Cornell tried to focus on the existential dilemmas and possible sacrifices of secret agents: "There's an isolation in that; the stakes are very high. I've done a lot of living in my 42 years, and it wasn't hard for me to relate to that." The song was also an introduction to the character, even though he has been in many previous movies—hence the title "You Know My Name"—dealing with Bond's actions such as his first assassination, "introducing himself to what may be the rest of his life and how he will live it and what it will mean."

== Release ==
Three versions of "You Know My Name" were produced. The "main version" took the primary spot of the single release. A "pop mix" was used in the music video, featured on the Carry On album, and appeared on German singles as the second track. "Film versions" were more orchestral and used in the Casino Royale's opening and closing credits.

The song was leaked on the internet on September 20, 2006. The first version, the grittier one which was leaked and not used in the movie, was made available for download on iTunes Store on November 13, 2006. It debuted on the UK Singles Download Chart at #20 on November 22, 2006. It was released as a stand-alone single on December 14, 2006, with a new acoustic version of the Soundgarden song "Black Hole Sun" on the B-side. The German, Dutch and Australian versions of the single have a second version of "You Know My Name" (called the pop mix) as a B-side. This version was used for the music video, and is on Chris Cornell's solo album Carry On. The orchestral version in the film's opening titles has not been commercially released.

The song is the first Bond theme not to be included on its film's soundtrack album. Cornell declared that it happened because he wanted the song to be "his", and since he wrote "You Know My Name" in midst of recording the solo album Carry On, he felt the song belonged to the album. In 2008, it was included in the compilation The Best of Bond... James Bond.

The song's music video was directed by Michael Haussman, who tried to compare "the lives of a professional spy and a rock star". It premiered on MTV's Making the Video on October 31, 2006.

=== Covers ===
Finnish rock band Poets of the Fall covered the song in 2008 for the compilation album Livenä Vieraissa.

== Reception ==
=== Critical response ===
"You Know My Name" received critical acclaim, with critics feeling it fit well in the film.

Film critic James Berardinelli considered the song to "sound eerily like something by John Barry". DVD Verdict's review praised the song, describing it as "working remarkably well in the film's context, lyrically and sonically", and Cinefantastique called it "the best Bond theme song in years, [that] captures the full-blooded glory of classics like 'Goldfinger'".

Entertainment Weekly listed "You Know My Name" on a list of Academy Award snubs for Best Original Song, describing it as "a musically suave, lyrically ominous rock tune that is perfect for Casino Royale's dark reboot of the spy franchise".

Among music critics, Billboard described it as "the best Bond theme since 'A View to a Kill'", praising the minimal production. On its review of Carry On, the magazine considered "You Know My Name" to be the best track of the album, describing it as "some of Cornell's most uncomplicated and accessible music to date". BBC's unnamed reviewer considered that Cornell's voice "weighs down" the song.

=== Commercial ===
"You Know My Name" was released in the winter of 2006 and became the most successful song from Chris Cornell on the rock charts. It peaked at number 79 on the Billboard Hot 100 and number 64 on the Billboard Pop 100 chart. In Europe, "You Know My Name" charted in several markets and peaked at number 7 in the UK Singles Chart, his highest placement in that country (including bands Cornell was a part of).

=== Accolades ===
Chris Cornell won both the Satellite Award for Best Original Song at the 11th Satellite Awards and the World Soundtrack Award for Best Original Song Written Directly for a Film at the World Soundtrack Awards 2007 for "You Know My Name" in 2007, and garnered a Grammy Award nomination for Best Song Written For Motion Picture, Television or Other Visual Media at the 50th Annual Grammy Awards the following year. The song also appeared on a shortlist of eligible songs for the Best Original Song category at the 79th Academy Awards, but did not qualify for the final list of nominees.

== Track listing ==
1

1. "You Know My Name" – 4:02
2. "Black Hole Sun" (acoustic) – 4:38

2

1. "You Know My Name" – 4:02
2. "You Know My Name" (pop mix)
3. "You Know My Name" (video)

== Personnel ==
- Chris Cornell – vocals, guitar
- Cameron Greider – guitar
- Gary Lucas – guitar
- Miles Mosley – strings, bass
- Nir Z – drums

== Charts ==
=== Weekly charts ===
Chart (2006–07)	Peak position
Austrian Single Chart	28
Danish Single Chart	2
Dutch Single Chart	10
Euro Digital Tracks	2
European Hot 100 Singles	16
Finnish Single Chart	3
French Single Chart	51
German Singles Chart	15
Greek Singles Chart	9
Irish Singles Chart	11
Italian Singles Chart	4
Norwegian Singles Chart	5
Swedish Singles Chart	21
Swiss Singles Chart	10
UK Downloads Chart	4
UK Singles Chart	7
US Billboard Hot 100	79
US Billboard Pop 100	64

=== Year-end charts ===
Year	Chart	Rank
2007	German Singles Chart	87
2006	UK Singles Chart	153

== Certifications and sales ==
Region	Certification	Certified units/sales
Denmark (IFPI Danmark)	Gold	4,000^{^}
United Kingdom (BPI)	Gold	400,000^{‡}
United States	—	290,000
^{^} Shipments figures based on certification alone.^{‡} Sales+streaming figures based on certification alone.

== See also ==
- Outline of James Bond
