= Arms Around Your Love =

Single by Chris Cornell

from the album Carry On
- Released: May 21, 2007
- Genre: Alternative rock
- Songwriter: Chris Cornell
- Producer: Steve Lillywhite

Chris Cornell singles chronology
"No Such Thing" (2007)	"Arms Around Your Love" (2007)	"She'll Never Be Your Man" (2007)

"Arms Around Your Love" is the third single from Chris Cornell's second solo album, Carry On. It was released on May 21, 2007.

In the UK, the song peaked at number 177. The video was also released in Canada, where the song received airplay on MuchMoreMusic.

== Track listing ==
No.	Title	Writer(s)	Length
1.	"Arms Around Your Love"	Chris Cornell	3:35
2.	"Thank You" (Led Zeppelin cover)	Jimmy Page, Robert Plant	4:47

== Chart positions ==
Chart (2007)	Peak position
UK Singles Chart	177
