= Euphoria Morning =

Euphoria Mourning

Studio album by Chris Cornell
- Released: September 21, 1999
- Recorded: 1998–1999
- Studio: 11 AD Studios in Los Angeles, California
- Genres: Rock; psychedelic rock; folk rock
- Length: 50:55
- Label: A&M
- Producers: Chris Cornell; Natasha Shneider; Alain Johannes

Chris Cornell chronology
Euphoria Mourning (1999)	Carry On (2007)

Singles from Euphoria Mourning
- 1. "Can't Change Me" Released: 1999; 2. "Preaching the End of the World" Released: 1999

Alternate Cover
- Re-released in 2015 as Euphoria Mourning

Euphoria Mourning (originally titled Euphoria Morning) is the first solo studio album by American musician Chris Cornell. It was released through A&M Records on September 21, 1999, and Cornell embarked on a tour in support of the album in 2000. Cornell's only album from between the dissolution of Soundgarden and the formation of Audioslave, it did not sell as well as much of his work with those groups, though it did sell over 75,000 copies in its first week of release and has gone on to sell over 393,000 copies in the U.S. The album was well-received critically, and its lead single, "Can't Change Me", was nominated for Best Male Rock Vocal Performance at the 42nd Annual Grammy Awards.

On August 14, 2015, Euphoria Morning was re-released on CD and vinyl with the modified title Euphoria Mourning, which Cornell stated in a press release is what he had originally intended to call the album.

== Production ==
=== Recording ===
In 1998, Cornell began working on material for a solo album in collaboration with Alain Johannes and Natasha Shneider of the band Eleven, and the album was recorded in Johannes and Schneider's Los Angeles home studio.

=== Track information ===
Cornell said the album's lead single, "Can't Change Me", is "kind of a sad discovery that this singer is involved with this person that has amazing powers to help people and change things positively, and he's realizing that none of it is really rubbing off on him." He told MTV News that the genesis of the song can be found in some of Soundgarden's hits, such as "Blow Up the Outside World" and "Fell on Black Days". An alternate recording of the song featuring Cornell singing in French can be found on various international editions of the album. The lyrics were translated into French by Alexis Lemoine.

"Flutter Girl" was an outtake from Superunknown, the 1994 Soundgarden album. The title was created by Pearl Jam bassist Jeff Ament as part of a joke tracklist for the character Poncier's demo tape in the 1992 Cameron Crowe film Singles, but Cornell surprised Crowe by writing and recording songs with the joke names. The five-track Poncier EP, which includes the 1992 version of "Flutter Girl", was released as a promotional CD in 2015 for Record Store Day.

A reworked version of "Mission", retitled "Mission 2000", was included on the soundtrack of the 2000 film Mission: Impossible 2.

Cornell stated that "Wave Goodbye" was written as a tribute to his friend Jeff Buckley, who died in 1997.

"Moonchild" is about Cornell's then-wife Susan Silver. In the song, he affectionately describes how she "gets really freaked out during the full moon".

=== Musical style ===
The album has been described as "psychedelic folk-rock" that "delves back into '60s psychedelic melodies and acoustic ditties", and "a shaded, textured rock album, lacking the grinding sludge and furious rock" of much of Soundgarden's music, yet "undeniably of a piece with Superunknown."

== Reception ==
Professional ratings
Review scores
Source	Rating
AllMusic	4/5 stars
Alternative Press	3/5 stars
Robert Christgau	C+
Entertainment Weekly	B+
NME	4/10
Q	3/5 stars
Rolling Stone	3.5/5 stars

While the album was not a particularly big seller for Cornell, the single "Can't Change Me" was nominated for Best Male Rock Vocal Performance at the 42nd Grammy Awards.

The song "Preaching the End of the World" inspired the title of Lorene Scafaria's 2012 film Seeking a Friend for the End of the World.

== Re-release and title change ==
The album was re-released on CD and vinyl on August 14, 2015, with the modified title Euphoria Mourning. Cornell said that is the title he had originally wanted for the album, but his manager at the time of the original release, Jim Guerinot, suggested that "Euphoria Morning" (without the "u") would be a better title:

It was a pretty dark album lyrically and pretty depressing, and I was going through a really difficult time in my life – my band wasn’t together anymore, my marriage was falling apart and I was dealing with it by drinking way too much, and that has its own problems, particularly with depression. So I titled the album Euphoria Mourning, but right before the record came out and I was doing interviews over the radio for example, if you say “Euphoria Mourning”, the listener doesn’t know if it’s mourning with a “u” or morning without a “u”. And that started to bother me. So I had a conversation with my manager at the time, and said I really love the title but do you think it’s confusing? And he suggested that Euphoria Morning would probably be a better title. I thought, in contrast to the lyrics maybe that works. And it wasn’t my manager’s fault, I was a grown man and could say I don’t think that’s a good idea, and in the back of my mind I didn’t think it was a good idea. But mentally I wasn’t together enough to really know what was right. So I went with “Morning”, and it’s bothered me ever since. It even showed up in an early review where someone reviewing the record said that the title sounded like a potpourri scent, and when I read that I was just like [with disdain], “Fuck! Fuckin’ bullshit!” The title was so beautifully poetic to begin with, just the concept of euphoria in mourning; it was a moment I felt inspired and I let all the air out of it. So when we decided to do its first vinyl release I thought, I want to change the fuckin’ title! [Laughs] It’s time to change it.

== Track listing ==
All lyrics are written by Chris Cornell, except as noted; all music is composed by Cornell, except as noted.

No.	Title	Lyrics	Music	Length
1.	"Can't Change Me"			3:23
2.	"Flutter Girl"		Cornell; Natasha Shneider; Alain Johannes	4:25
3.	"Preaching the End of the World"			4:41
4.	"Follow My Way"		Cornell; Shneider; Johannes	5:10
5.	"When I'm Down"			4:20
6.	"Mission"		Cornell; Shneider; Johannes	4:05
7.	"Wave Goodbye"			3:43
8.	"Moonchild"			4:02
9.	"Sweet Euphoria"			3:08
10.	"Disappearing One"		Shneider; Johannes	3:48
11.	"Pillow of Your Bones"	Cornell; Shneider; Johannes	Shneider	4:29
12.	"Steel Rain"		Cornell; Shneider	5:41

Japanese bonus tracks
No.	Title	Length
13.	"Sunshower"	5:52
14.	"Can't Change Me" (French version)	3:47

- "Sunshower" had previously been released on the soundtrack of the 1998 film Great Expectations.
- "Can't Change Me" (French version) was also included on various other international editions of the album.

== Personnel ==
Personnel adapted from Euphoria Morning liner notes.

Main personnel

- Chris Cornell - lead vocals (all tracks), guitar (tracks 1–3 and 5–13), harmonica (track 1)
- Alain Johannes - guitar (tracks 1–6, 8, and 10–12), bass guitar (tracks 2–5, 10, and 11), backing vocals (tracks 1 and 13), theremin (track 4), mandolin (tracks 4 and 13), clarinet (track 10), tabla (track 12)
- Natasha Shneider - keyboards (tracks 1–4, 6–8, and 10–13), bass guitar (tracks 6 and 13), backing vocals (tracks 4–7, and 13), tambourine (tracks 1–4, 11, and 12), piano (track 5), organ (track 5), timpani (track 11)
- Ric Markmann - bass guitar (tracks 1, 7, 8, and 12)
- Josh Freese - drums (tracks 1–4, 6, 8, and 11)

Additional musicians

- Jason Falkner - bass guitar (track 5)
- Greg Upchurch - drums (track 5)
- Victor Indrizzo - drums (track 7)
- Matt Cameron - drums (track 10)
- Bill Rieflin - drums (track 12)
- Misha Shneider - bayan (track 14)

Technical personnel

- Chris Cornell - production, engineering, mixing
- Alain Johannes - production, engineering, mixing
- Natasha Shneider - production, engineering, mixing
- Dave Collins - mastering

== Charts ==
Chart (1999)	Peak position
US Billboard 200	18
Canadian Albums (Billboard)	14
