= Casino Royale (2006 soundtrack) =

Casino Royale: Original Motion Picture Soundtrack

Soundtrack album by David Arnold
- Released: 14 November 2006
- Recorded: 2006
- Genre: Film score
- Length: 74:20
- Label: Sony Classical
- Producer: David Arnold

David Arnold chronology
Stoned (2005)	Casino Royale: Original Motion Picture Soundtrack (2006)	Hot Fuzz (2007)

Professional ratings
Review scores
Source	Rating
AllMusic	2.5/5 stars
Empire	5/5 stars
Filmtracks	4/5 stars
Movie Music UK	4/5 stars
Movie Wave	3/5 stars
ScoreNotes	B
SoundtrackNet	3.5/5 stars

Casino Royale: Original Motion Picture Soundtrack is the soundtrack album for the 2006 film Casino Royale. It was released by Sony Classical on 14 November 2006. The music was composed by David Arnold, and is Arnold's fourth soundtrack for the popular James Bond movie series. Frequent collaborator Nicholas Dodd orchestrated and conducted the score.

== Development ==
Producers Michael G. Wilson and Barbara Broccoli announced on 26 July 2006 that Chris Cornell, the former Audioslave and Soundgarden lead singer, composed and would sing "You Know My Name", the Casino Royale title song. Cornell collaborated with David Arnold who composed the film's score. Cornell was first reported to be writing and performing the song on 20 July 2006 by the Finnish newspaper IltaАЬА-Sanomat. "You Know My Name" is the first theme song since "All Time High" by Rita Coolidge from 1983's Octopussy to use a different title than the film, and Cornell is the first male performer since a-ha (in 1987's The Living Daylights). It is only the fourth Bond theme (after John Barry's opening medley of Dr. No, his instrumental theme from On Her Majesty's Secret Service and "All Time High" from Octopussy) to make no reference to the title of the film. The soundtrack was completed early in the morning on 11 October 2006. The soundtrack was released on 14 November 2006.

Various names were reported in the media prior to the announcement, some reports going so far as to have the performers apparently claim they were working on the theme. This list includes Tina Turner who previously sang "GoldenEye" for the 1995 Bond film of the same name, and Tony Christie.

=== Title song and tracks ===
The Casino Royale title song "You Know My Name" by Chris Cornell is not featured on the soundtrack album, but released separately as a single. However, motifs from the song serve as James Bond (Daniel Craig)'s theme throughout the film, e.g. the tracks "I'm the Money" and "Aston Montenegro", feature two different instrumental renditions of its chorus. The "You Know My Name" CD single was released on 11 December 2006.

Some cues for the movie that did not make the final selection of tracks for the soundtrack album are available as bonus track downloads in iTunes from the iTunes Store.

== Leitmotifs ==
Composer David Arnold employs three primary leitmotifs on the soundtrack, that recur in two or more of the tracks listed. One is pinned to the film’s title theme, "You Know My Name" by Chris Cornell, which serves as a musical representation of Bond’s evolving identity as he earns his 00 status. Another leitmotif is associated with Vesper Lynd, Bond's romantic interest, and reflects his emotional vulnerability. A third, more minor motif, is tied to Solange, encapsulating Bond's brief relationship with her. Arnold’s approach to action scoring follows John Barry’s tradition of using “action themes” – secondary motifs that underscore key sequences with references to the main title theme, the "James Bond Theme", or original musical material. The action theme composed for Casino Royale is featured in pieces such as "Miami International", "Stairwell Fight", and "The Switch", blending rhythmic propulsion with electric guitar and orchestral flourishes. Notably, Arnold withholds the classic "James Bond Theme" until the final track, "The Name's Bond... James Bond", it only being hinted towards when Bond wins his Aston Martin DB5 in a game of poker, symbolizing Bond's full transformation into the iconic spy.

You Know My Name Theme

- 1. "African Rundown"
- 4. "Blunt Instrument"
- 8. "Miami International"
- 9. "I'm the Money"
- 10. "Aston Montenegro"

Vesper Theme

- 11. "Dinner Jackets"
- 14. "Vesper"
- 20. "City of Lovers"
- 23. "Death of Vesper"

Solange Theme

- 6. "Solange"
- 7. "Trip Aces"

== Track listing ==
Standard album
No.	Title	Length
1.	"African Rundown" (Contains the film's title theme "You Know My Name" (instrumental))	6:52
2.	"Nothing Sinister"	1:27
3.	"Unauthorised Access"	1:08
4.	"Blunt Instrument" (Contains the "James Bond Theme", originally composed for the Dr. No soundtrack and "You Know My Name" (instrumental))	2:22
5.	"CCTV"	1:30
6.	"Solange"	0:59
7.	"Trip Aces" (Contains the "James Bond Theme" and "You Know My Name" (instrumental))	2:06
8.	"Miami International" (Contains the film's title theme "You Know My Name" (instrumental))	12:43
9.	"I'm the Money" (Contains the film's title theme "You Know My Name" (instrumental))	0:27
10.	"Aston Montenegro" (Contains the film's title theme "You Know My Name" (instrumental))	1:03
11.	"Dinner Jackets" (Contains the "James Bond Theme", and "You Know My Name" (instrumental))	1:52
12.	"The Tell"	3:23
13.	"Stairwell Fight"	4:12
14.	"Vesper"	1:44
15.	"Bond Loses It All"	3:56
16.	"Dirty Martini" (Contains the "James Bond Theme",)	3:49
17.	"Bond Wins It All" (Contains the "James Bond Theme", and "You Know My Name" (instrumental))	4:32
18.	"The End of an Aston Martin"	1:30
19.	"The Bad Die Young"	1:18
20.	"City of Lovers"	3:30
21.	"The Switch" (Contains the "James Bond Theme", and "You Know My Name" (instrumental))	5:07
22.	"Fall of a House in Venice" (Contains the "James Bond Theme", and "You Know My Name" (instrumental))	1:53
23.	"Death of Vesper"	2:50
24.	"The Bitch Is Dead" (Contains the "James Bond Theme")	1:05
25.	"The Name's Bond... James Bond" (Contains the "James Bond Theme")	2:49
Total length:		74:20

iTunes bonus tracks
No.	Title	Length
1.	"Licence: 2 Kills"	2:38
2.	"Reveal LeChiffre"	1:25
3.	"Mongoose vs. Snake"	1:16
4.	"Bombers Away"	0:27
5.	"Push Them Overboard"	0:27
6.	"Bedside Computer"	0:41
7.	"Beep Beep Beep Bang"	0:37
8.	"Inhaler"	0:27
9.	"Brother from Langley"	1:41
10.	"Prelude to a Beating"	1:17
11.	"Coming Round"	1:11
12.	"I'm Yours"	1:04
13.	"Running to the Elevator"	0:28
Total length:		87:59

== See also ==
- Outline of James Bond
