= Natasha Shneider =

Latvian musician (1956–2008)

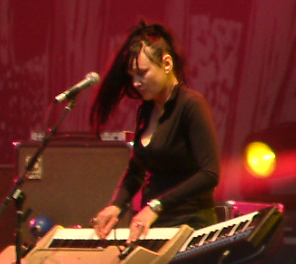
- Shneider performing with Queens of the Stone Age, 2005

Background information
- Also known as: Natasha Kapustin
- Born: Natalia Mikhailovna Schneiderman; May 22, 1956; Riga, Latvian SSR, Soviet Union (now Latvia)
- Died: July 2, 2008 (aged 52) Los Angeles, California, U.S.
- Genres: Rock; alternative rock; pop
- Occupations: Singer-songwriter; singer; musician; actress
- Instruments: Vocals; keyboards; piano; bass
- Years active: early 1970s–2008

Natalia Mikhailovna Schneiderman (Russian: Наталья Михайловна Шнайдерман, romanized: Natal'ya Mikhaylovna Shnayderman, IPA: [nɐˈtalʲjə mʲɪˈxajlɐvnə ˈʂnajdɨrmən]; May 22, 1956 – July 2, 2008), known as Natasha Shneider, was a Latvian-born Soviet-American musician and actress. She was most notably the keyboardist and vocalist in the band Eleven, along with her partner, bandmate Alain Johannes. Shneider contributed to tracks for Chris Cornell and Queens of the Stone Age, and together with Johannes toured with Cornell on his Euphoria Morning tour in 1999 and with Queens in 2005 on their Lullabies to Paralyze tour. She died of cancer in 2008.

== Life and career ==
Natalia Mikhailovna Schneiderman was born in Riga, Latvia (at the time a member state of the Soviet Union), to a Jewish family. She proved musically gifted from an early age and both of her parents were musicians.

In the early 1970s, Shneider was a member of 'Sovremennik', a state-run pop orchestra, that featured her on vocals and piano, as well as her first husband Serge Kapustin (born 1949) on guitar and percussion. Her brother Vladimir Shneider (1951–2012) produced and played piano and keyboards for the 'Singing Hearts', which was one of Russia's hottest groups in the mid-1970s, whose output and sound were heavily controlled by the Soviet authorities. Vladimir Shneider recalled: "We'd sing 37 songs about how good the Communist Party is, and at the end—if we were lucky—we were allowed to play a mellow song like Killing Me Softly or Ain't No Sunshine. But never rock."

In May 1976, the Schneiderman siblings and Kapustin defected to the West, arriving in New York City without finances or connections. Natasha and Kapustin's son Robin was born just two months after arriving. They took day jobs and played evening gigs around the city - Vladimir Schneiderman also changed his surname to Shneider, with Natasha changing her married surname from Kapustina to Kapustin. In 1978 they arrived in Hollywood where they met Guy Costa, the head of Motown's Studio Operations, who introduced them to Berry Gordy, founder of Motown Records. As a consequence of the meeting with Gordy they were signed to the label, reputedly the first Russian band to be on a major label. In June 1980 their newly named group, Black Russian, released an album of R&B styled pop that was well received by Billboard who highlighted the songs Mystified, Leave Me Now (which was later released as a single), Emptiness, New York City, and Love's Enough. The album was not a commercial success and Black Russian did not continue. Natasha Shneider and Serge Kapustin then divorced.

In 1987, Shneider married her second husband Alain Johannes and they released the album Walk the Moon under the MCA label. In 1990 they formed the band Eleven with drummer Jack Irons and released their debut album Awake in a Dream the following year. The group would go on to release four more albums over the next twenty years, with Irons leaving during their third album (Thunk) in 1995 to play with Pearl Jam, and coming back for the fifth album (Howling Book) in 2003.

Shneider and Johannes participated with Josh Homme and other artists on The Desert Sessions, Volumes 7 & 8. They also contributed to the 2002 Queens of the Stone Age album Songs for the Deaf, and joined the band as part of their touring line-up in support of their 2005 album, Lullabies to Paralyze (Alain Johannes also contributed on several Lullabies' tracks).

They wrote, performed and produced with Chris Cornell for his 1999 solo album, Euphoria Morning, and formed part of his band for the subsequent tour. The song "Someone to Die For" that Shneider wrote alongside Cornell and Johannes, was part of the soundtrack of Spider-Man 2 (2004), performed by Jimmy Gnecco of Ours and Brian May of Queen. A demo version of the song performed by Cornell and Eleven is available on the internet.

== Acting career ==
Shneider acted in two feature films, playing the roles of Soviet cosmonaut Irina Yakunina in the 1984 film 2010, and as Polish former exchange student Wanda Yakubovska in the film Spiker (1986). She also had roles in the TV shows Miami Vice and Hill Street Blues. Shneider wrote and performed the song "Who's in Control", for the 2004 film Catwoman, and contributed harpsichord to the 2008 Louis XIV track "Guilt By Association".

== Death ==
On July 2, 2008, Shneider died from cancer. The news broke with a message posted on the MySpace page of the band Sweethead, of which Shneider's close friend and former band-mate Troy Van Leeuwen is a member:

Natasha Schneider [sic], musician extraordinaire, former actress, singer of the ground-breaking band Eleven, and one-time Queens of the Stone Age keyboard player, died today at 11:11 am of cancer. She was a brilliant, beautiful, and ballsy woman who will be missed deeply by all those who knew her. Send your loving thoughts her way in the universe.

— Sweethead MySpace (2008)

The following message later replaced the main page at qotsa.com:

On July 2nd, at 11:11 am, Natasha Shneider passed away. She ended her time in this Life with the style and poetry that she lived all the days previous, crossing over while held in the arms of her closest and dearest. No words can encapsulate the unwaivering [sic] strength she provided, adversities she overcame, the talents she possessed & nurtured, the sharpness of her wit nor the beautiful complexity of her intellect. We are so thankful for her influence & the gift of her friendship.

A celebration of Natasha Shneider will be held in Hollywood at the Henry Fonda Theatre on Saturday, Aug 16th. Further details will be released shortly. All proceeds of the benefit and donations made will go to relieve the burden of Natasha's fight against cancer. To donate, go to NatashaShneider.org

Now is all we have. May you all make the most of it.

— Josh Homme, qotsa.com, 2008

Shneider is buried at the Hollywood Forever Cemetery in Los Angeles.

== Legacy ==
On August 16, 2008, Queens of the Stone Age performed a concert in celebration of Shneider's life at the Henry Fonda Theatre in Los Angeles. They were joined on stage by Alain Johannes, Tenacious D's Jack Black and Kyle Gass, Matt Cameron, Brody Dalle, Jesse Hughes, Chris Goss and PJ Harvey, playing a variety of QOTSA and non-QOTSA songs. Proceeds from the concert went to defray the costs associated with Shneider's illness.

In late 2009, "Time for Miracles", a song she co-wrote with Johannes, was recorded by Adam Lambert and used in the movie 2012. In 2010, the track "WYUT", co-written by Shneider, Johannes and Natalie Imbruglia, appeared on Imbruglia's album Come to Life.

While on his solo tour from 2011 to 2016, Chris Cornell often paid tribute to her and played the song "When I'm Down" (from the album Euphoria Morning that Shneider produced), accompanied by a vinyl recording of the original piano track that Shneider performed for the song.
