= David Arnold =

British film composer (born 1962)

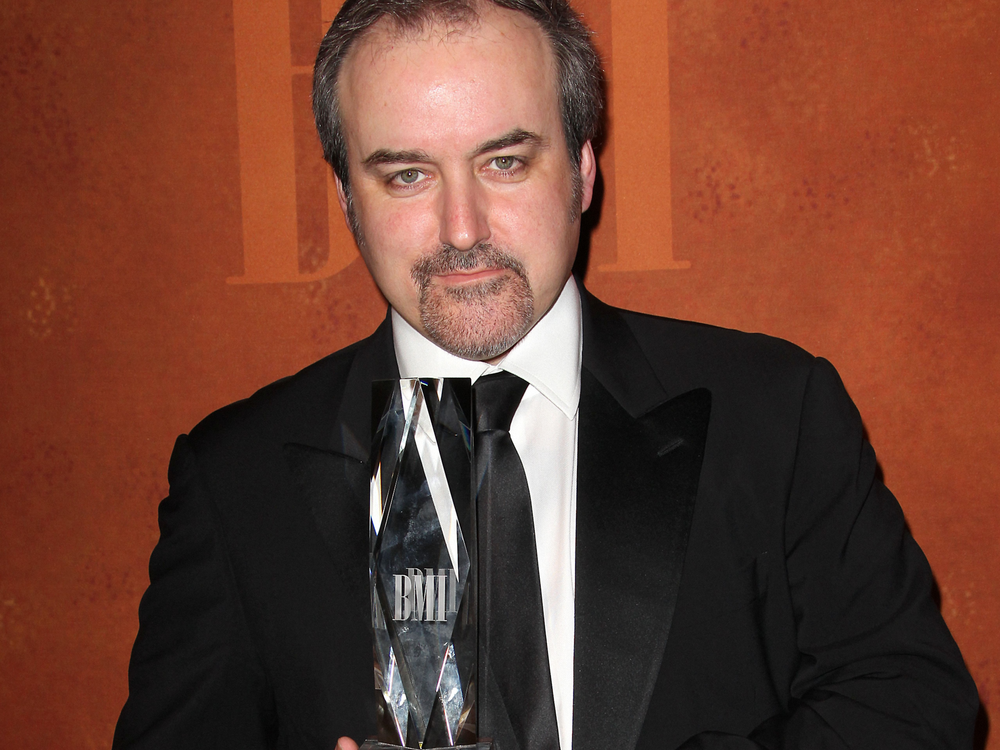
- Arnold at the BMI Awards in May 2011

Background information
- Born: 23 January 1962 (age 64); Luton, England
- Genre: Film score
- Occupation: Composer
- Instruments: Clarinet; guitar; piano
- Years active: 1993–present

David Arnold (born 23 January 1962) is an English film composer whose credits include scoring five James Bond films (1997–2008), as well as Stargate (1994), Independence Day (1996), Godzilla (1998), Shaft (2000), 2 Fast 2 Furious (2003), Four Brothers (2005), Hot Fuzz (2007), and the television series Little Britain and Sherlock. For Independence Day, he received a Grammy Award for Best Instrumental Composition Written for a Motion Picture or for Television, and for Sherlock, he and co-composer Michael Price won a Creative Arts Emmy for the score of "His Last Vow", the final episode in the third series. Arnold scored the BBC / Amazon Prime series Good Omens (2019) adapted by Neil Gaiman from his book Good Omens, written with Terry Pratchett. Arnold is a fellow of the British Academy of Songwriters, Composers and Authors.

== Career ==
While attending a Sixth Form College in Luton, Arnold became friends with director Danny Cannon. Cannon initially created short films for which Arnold was asked to write the music. The two made their respective major film debuts with The Young Americans. "Play Dead", a song from the film with singer Björk, charted No. 12 in the UK. The following year he scored Stargate and Last of the Dogmen, with excerpts from the former ranking third in the most commonly used soundtrack cues for film trailers.

Arnold then composed music for Stargate director Roland Emmerich's next two movies, Independence Day and Godzilla, as well as four movies for director John Singleton. In addition, he has scored various comedies, dramas, and nineteenth-century period pieces, as well as providing music for several British television shows including the 2000 remake of Randall and Hopkirk (Deceased) and Little Britain. During film production, his compositions are conducted by Nicholas Dodd. In 2010, he composed the music for Come Fly With Me, a British television series from the producers of Little Britain.

He is a member of the British Academy of Songwriters, Composers and Authors (BASCA). On Thursday 29 November 2012, Arnold received an honorary degree from University of West London. Now a university honorary, he will work closely with the university in particular London College of Music, a faculty within the institute. In 2014, he appeared as himself in The Life of Rock with Brian Pern.

=== Film music concerts ===
Arnold performed his debut orchestral concert, showcasing his film and television music, on Sunday 6 July 2014 at London's Royal Festival Hall. The line-up featured Nicholas Dodd conducting, David McAlmont as surprise guest vocalist ("My secret weapon!" said Arnold) and the Urban Voices Collective choir, plus Mark Gatiss and Amanda Abbington introducing the suite of Sherlock music, for which Arnold's collaborator on the project, Michael Price, replaced Dodd.

He performed his music in a series of orchestral concerts in 2015: Dublin) in January (with the RTÉ Concert Orchestra); Manchester (with the Manchester Camerata) in April; and London (with the Royal Philharmonic Orchestra), Birmingham and Nottingham (with the City of Birmingham Symphony Orchestra (CBSO)) in June 2015. He was also the special guest at 'The music of David Arnold', a concert in Lucerne in October 2015, with Ludwig Wicki conducting the 21st Century Symphony Orchestra and Chorus. On 5 June 2016 Film Music Prague performed a concert of his work, with Arnold in attendance (and performing) as special guest. In February 2016 the Royal Albert Hall announced the premiere of Independence Day Live on 22 September 2016. This celebrated the 20th anniversary of the film's release with a live orchestral performance. David Arnold gave a pre-show talk about his work and the Royal Philharmonic Concert Orchestra and Maida Vale Singers (conducted by Gavin Greenaway) performed the original music while the film screened. The Upcoming magazine gave the event a five star review noting that "with unrivalled acoustics and a ceiling filled with floating UFO-shaped objects, the Hall set the ideal scene for the audience and the musicians alike" and that the production "kept the audience on the edge of their seats as if the film had just been released for the first time."

Arnold hosted another two concerts of his music in Dublin, at the Bord Gáis Energy Theatre on 19 and 20 May 2017, with the RTÉ Concert Orchestra. The first concert showcased his career in writing music for film and television, the second was Independence Day Live with the film screened as the orchestra played the score alongside. The first James Bond film ever to be screened with a live orchestra was Casino Royale in Concert which took place at the Royal Albert Hall on Saturday 30 September 2017; David Arnold held a pre-concert question and answer session.

=== James Bond ===
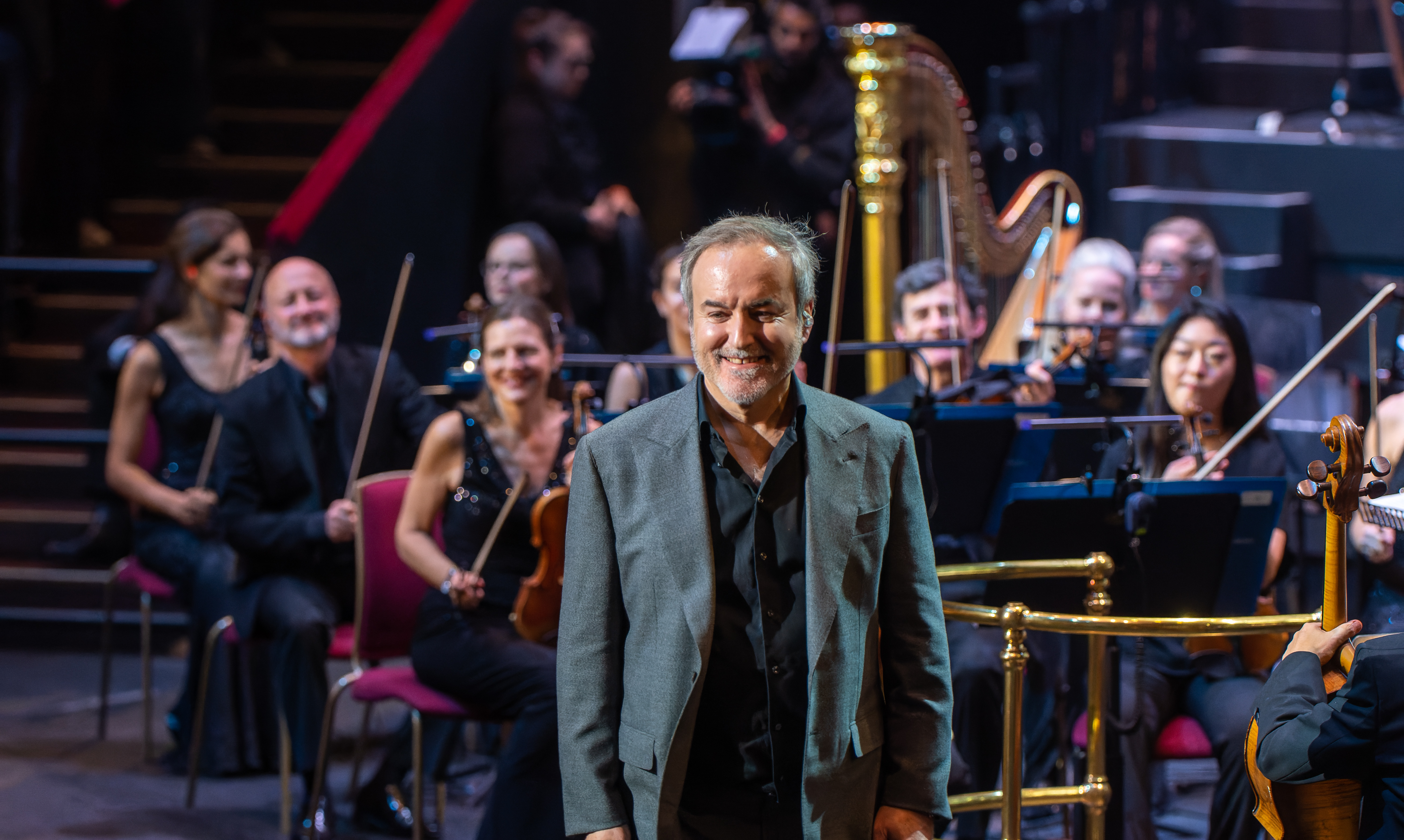
Arnold at the Royal Albert Hall in London in October 2022 with the Royal Philharmonic Orchestra. He curated The Sound of 007 in Concert, marking 60 years of the Bond film series.

Arnold was a Bond fan from an early age and also a fan of Bond composer John Barry. In 1997, Arnold produced Shaken and Stirred: The David Arnold James Bond Project, an album featuring new versions of the themes from various James Bond films. The album featured a variety of contemporary artists including Jarvis Cocker, Chrissie Hynde, David McAlmont, Propellerheads and Iggy Pop; a version of You Only Live Twice by Björk was recorded but not included on the album. John Barry, the composer of many of the themes on the album, was complimentary about Arnold's interpretation of his work: "He was very faithful to the melodic and harmonic content, but he's added a whole other rhythmic freshness and some interesting casting in terms of the artists chosen to do the songs. I think it's a terrific album. I'm very flattered." Barry contacted Barbara Broccoli, producer of the then-upcoming Tomorrow Never Dies, to recommend Arnold as the film's composer. Arnold was hired to score the instalment and, returning the compliment to the man he refers to as "The guvnor", included musical references to Barry's score for From Russia with Love, as well as, of course, the James Bond Theme composed by Monty Norman with Barry's arrangement.

Arnold scored the four subsequent Bond films: The World Is Not Enough, Die Another Day (in which he included references to John Barry's score for On Her Majesty's Secret Service), Casino Royale and Quantum of Solace. Arnold did not score the 23rd James Bond film, Skyfall, with Thomas Newman taking his place. Arnold commented that Newman had been selected by the film's director, Sam Mendes, because of their history of working together, rather than because of Arnold's commitment to working as composer for the Closing Ceremonies of the 2012 Summer Olympics and Paralympics. However, a part of Arnold's composition work on Casino Royale was reused, with a credit, in Skyfall and again in Spectre.

Arnold also co-wrote the main theme songs for The World Is Not Enough ("The World Is Not Enough" by Garbage) and Casino Royale ("You Know My Name" by Chris Cornell), as well as "Surrender" by k.d. lang which appears during the end credits of Tomorrow Never Dies having been originally proposed as the opening theme. Arnold also contributed the main themes to Kevin Kiner's score for Activision's GoldenEye 007, the remake of the 1997 game of the same name.

In 2017, a part of a track entitled "Vesper" from Arnold's composition work on the Casino Royale soundtrack was reused in a Sherlock episode entitled "The Final Problem", the third episode of the fourth series, in a track entitled "Pick Up" composed by Arnold himself and Michael Price.

Arnold co-wrote and composed the main theme for the 2026 video game 007 First Light with Lana Del Rey. Immersing himself in the game's concept art and in-development footage, and using Ian Fleming's source material as additional influence, Arnold wanted to write a song that explored Bond's origins while simultaneously evolving the Bond theme song. He decided on having softer verses, punctuated by brass stabs of "musical violence".

== Other work ==
Arnold has collaborated with such musical acts as Cast, Kaiser Chiefs, Massive Attack, and Pulp, and solo artists Natasha Bedingfield, Melanie C, Björk, Chris Cornell, Shirley Manson, Mark Morriss, Nina Persson and in 2009 produced Shirley Bassey's album The Performance.

In 2001, he provided a new arrangement of Ron Grainer's Doctor Who theme music for the Eighth Doctor audio dramas from Big Finish Productions. His version was used as the Eighth Doctor theme starting with 2001's Storm Warning until 2008, when it was replaced with a new version arranged by Nicholas Briggs starting with Dead London. Arnold's theme returned to the Eighth Doctor releases with the 2012 box set, Dark Eyes.

Arnold is the second cousin of Irish singer-songwriter Damien Rice, and is an ambassador for aid agency CARE International in the UK. He has made minor appearances in two different episodes of Little Britain as separate characters.

In February 2011, it was announced that he had been appointed musical director for the 2012 Olympic Games and the 2012 Paralympic Games in London.

In May 2011, he was part of the United Kingdom's jury for the Eurovision Song Contest 2011.

Arnold took part in a tribute to John Barry on 20 June 2011 at the Royal Albert Hall in London, singing a song that was composed by Barry and playing the guitar part of the James Bond theme.

In 2014, Arnold teamed up with Richard Thomas, to write the music and lyrics for the new West End musical Made in Dagenham.

In October 2015 he collaborated with Lethal Bizzle and Sinead Harnett to create a song combining orchestral, grime and soul elements. The song, 'Come This Far', was performed live at a special event at One Mayfair, as part of Bulmers Cider's LiveColourful LIVE promotion, and made available as a free download from Bulmers' website. He and Sherlock co-composer Michael Price also composed the music for ITV's Jekyll and Hyde television series which premiered in October 2015.

In September 2016 the Royal Albert Hall hosted an orchestral performance of Independence Day with the score performed live to picture, Arnold gave a pre-show talk.

In 2019, Arnold provided additional production for Sophie Ellis-Bextor's orchestral album, The Song Diaries. Later in 2020, he co-produced an orchestral cover of "My Favourite Things" (from The Sound of Music) along with Richard Jones (of The Feeling) for Sophie's 2020 compilation album Songs From The Kitchen Disco.

In July 2023, it was announced that Arnold and Ellis-Bextor would collaborate with lyricist Don Black for the track to Channel 4 and Universal Pictures film Mog's Christmas, based upon the children's book series by Judith Kerr. The track, titled "As Long As I Belong", is about "the importance of belonging". The film is slated for a Q4 2023 release.

== Acting filmography ==
Year	Title	Role	Notes
1993	The Young Americans	Wedding Band	Also composed the score
2000	The League of Gentlemen	Victorian Gentleman with Fox	TV series (1 episode: "The League of Gentlemen Christmas Special")
2003	Little Britain	Minicab Controller / Politician	TV series (2 episodes)

== Discography ==
=== Films ===
Year	Title	Director	Studio(s)	Notes
1993	The Young Americans	Danny Cannon	PolyGram Filmed Entertainment Working Title Films	—N/a
1994	Stargate	Roland Emmerich	Metro-Goldwyn-Mayer Canal+ Centropolis Film Productions Carolco Pictures	—N/a
1995	Last of the Dogmen	Tab Murphy	Savoy Pictures (North America) Pathé (International) Carolco Pictures	—N/a
1996	Independence Day	Roland Emmerich	20th Century Fox Centropolis Entertainment	—N/a
1997	A Life Less Ordinary	Danny Boyle	20th Century Fox (United States) PolyGram Filmed Entertainment (International) Channel Four Films	—N/a
1997	Tomorrow Never Dies	Roger Spottiswoode	Metro-Goldwyn-Mayer Eon Productions	—N/a
1998	Godzilla	Roland Emmerich	TriStar Pictures Centropolis Entertainment	—N/a
1999	Wing Commander	Chris Roberts	20th Century Fox Digital Anvil	Main theme only Composed with Kevin Kiner
1999	The World Is Not Enough	Michael Apted	Metro-Goldwyn-Mayer Eon Productions	—N/a
2000	Shaft	John Singleton	Paramount Pictures Scott Rudin Productions	—N/a
2001	Baby Boy	John Singleton	Columbia Pictures	—N/a
2001	The Musketeer	Peter Hyams	Universal Pictures Miramax Films MDP Worldwide Crystal Sky Worldwide	—N/a
2001	Zoolander	Ben Stiller	Paramount Pictures Village Roadshow Pictures VH1 Films NPV Entertainment Scott Rudin Productions	—N/a
2002	Changing Lanes	Roger Michell	Paramount Pictures	—N/a
2002	Hollywood Ending	Woody Allen	DreamWorks Pictures	—N/a
2002	Enough	Michael Apted	Columbia Pictures	—N/a
2002	Die Another Day	Lee Tamahori	Metro-Goldwyn-Mayer Eon Productions	—N/a
2003	2 Fast 2 Furious	John Singleton	Universal Pictures Original Film	—N/a
2004	The Stepford Wives	Frank Oz	Paramount Pictures (United States) DreamWorks Pictures (International)	—N/a
2005	Four Brothers	John Singleton	Paramount Pictures Di Bonaventura Pictures	—N/a
2005	Stoned	Stephen Woolley	Screen Media Films	—N/a
2006	Amazing Grace	Michael Apted	Momentum Pictures (United Kingdom) Samuel Goldwyn Films (United States)	—N/a
2006	Casino Royale	Martin Campbell	Metro-Goldwyn-Mayer Columbia Pictures Eon Productions	—N/a
2007	Hot Fuzz	Edgar Wright	Rogue Pictures (United States) Universal Pictures (International) StudioCanal Working Title Films Big Talk Productions	—N/a
2007	Don't	Edgar Wright	Dimension Films Vivendi Entertainment Troublemaker Studios The Weinstein Company	Fake trailer segment from Grindhouse
2008	Agent Crush	Sean Robinson	Fantastic Films International	—N/a
2008	How to Lose Friends & Alienate People	Robert B. Weide	Paramount Pictures (United Kingdom) Metro-Goldwyn-Mayer (United States) Film4	—N/a
2008	Quantum of Solace	Marc Forster	Metro-Goldwyn-Mayer Columbia Pictures Eon Productions	—N/a
2010	Made in Dagenham	Nigel Cole	Paramount Pictures BBC Films HanWay Films	—N/a
2010	Morning Glory	Roger Michell	Paramount Pictures Bad Robot	—N/a
2010	The Chronicles of Narnia: The Voyage of the Dawn Treader	Michael Apted	20th Century Fox Walden Media	Contains themes composed by Harry Gregson-Williams
2011	Paul	Greg Mottola	Universal Pictures Relativity Media Working Title Films Big Talk Pictures	—N/a
2011	Unwatchable	Marc Hawker	—N/a	Short film
2012	The Book of Fire	Mike Christie	—N/a	As part of the 2012 Summer Paralympics closing ceremony Short film
2012	Mr Stink	Declan Lowney	—N/a	Television film
2022	Confess, Fletch	Greg Mottola	Miramax	—N/a

=== Television ===
Year	Title	Studio(s)	Notes
1997	The Visitor	Centropolis Television 20th Century Fox Television	Main theme on pilot episode only Rest of score composed by Kevin Kiner
2000–2001	Randall & Hopkirk (Deceased)	Working Title Films	Main theme only (composed with Tim Simenon). Single release by David Arnold and Nina Persson reached No. 48 (UK).
2001–2002	UC: Undercover	20th Century Fox Television	Main theme only Composed with Kevin Kiner
2003	Bloodlines: The Dracula Family Tree	—N/a	Documentary
2003–2006	Little Britain	BBC	
2008	Little Britain USA	19 Entertainment Reveille Productions HBO Original Programming	3 episodes
2008	Crooked House	Tiger Aspect Productions	TV miniseries
2009	Free Agents	Big Talk Productions Bwark Productions	—N/a
2010–2017	Sherlock	Hartswood Films BBC Wales WGBH	Composed with Michael Price; Primetime Emmy Award for Outstanding Music Composition for a Miniseries, Movie or a Special (Original Dramatic Score) (2014); British Academy Television Award for Best Original Television Music; Nominated — Primetime Emmy Award for Outstanding Music Composition for a Miniseries, Movie or a Special (Original Dramatic Score) (2010, 2011)
2010–2011	Come Fly with Me	BBC Little Britain Productions	
2012	The Matt Lucas Awards	John Stanley Productions	
2019	Good Omens	Amazon Studios BBC Studios	TV miniseries
2019	The Tiger Who Came to Tea	Channel 4	Animation narrated by David Walliams, score by David Arnold, song 'Hey Tiger' co-written with Don Black and sung by Robbie Williams
2020	Dracula		
2023–present	007: Road to a Million	72 Films MGM Television Eon Productions Amazon Studios	Main theme only Rest of score by Sam Thompson
2023	Mog's Christmas	Channel 4	Animation starring Benedict Cumberbatch and Claire Foy, score by David Arnold and the theme song “As Long as I Belong” is composed by David Arnold with lyrics by Don Black and performed by Sophie Ellis-Bextor

=== Video games ===
Year	Title	Developer	Publisher	Notes
2010	GoldenEye 007	Eurocom (Wii/PS3/Xbox 360) n-Space (DS)	Activision Nintendo (Wii)	Re-arranged the main title song only The soundtrack is composed by Kevin Kiner
2012	007 Legends	Eurocom	Activision Nintendo (Wii)	Wrote and composed the main title theme tune only The soundtrack is composed by Kevin Kiner
2026	007 First Light	IO Interactive		Co-wrote and composed "First Light" only The soundtrack is composed by The Flight

=== Web series ===
Year	Title	Studio(s)	Notes
2010–2011	Stiller & Meara	Red Hour Digital	—N/a

=== Singles in charts ===
Year	Single	Peak chart positions							Album / Film
Year	Single	UK	IRE	NED	BEL (FLA)	GER	SWE	NOR	Album / Film
1993	"Play Dead" (with Björk)	12	18	11	33	41	7	10	The Young Americans
1997	"On Her Majesty's Secret Service" (with Propellerheads)	7	—	—	—	—	—	—	Shaken & Stirred
1997	"Diamonds Are Forever" (with David McAlmont)	39	—	—	—	—	—	—	Shaken & Stirred
1999	"One Brief Moment" (with Natacha Atlas)	125	—	—	—	—	—	—	Gedida
2000	"Theme From Randall & Hopkirk (Deceased)" (with Nina Persson)	49	—	—	—	—	—	—	Randall & Hopkirk (Deceased)
2012	"Wish You Were Here" (with Ed Sheeran, Richard Jones, Nick Mason & Mike Rutherford)	34	59	—	—	—	—	—	A Symphony of British Music
"—" denotes releases that did not chart or were not released.

== Awards ==
- Won: Grammy Award – Best Instrumental Composition Written for a Motion Picture or for Television – Independence Day
- Won: Ivor Novello Awards – Best International Film Score for The World Is Not Enough
- Won: Ivor Novello Awards – BASCA Fellowship (2005)
- Nominated: BAFTA Award – Anthony Asquith Award for Film Music – Casino Royale
- Nominated: Grammy Award – Best Song Written for Motion Picture, Television or Other Visual Media – You Know My Name from Casino Royale (songwriter)
- Won: BBC Radio Awards – Best music production – The Sound of Cinema with David Arnold
- Won: Emmy Award - Outstanding Music Composition for a Miniseries, Movie, or a Special – Sherlock ("His Last Vow") (with Michael Price)
