= Tracks Across America Tour '82 =

1982 concert tour by Blondie

Tracks Across America Tour 82'
- Tour by Blondie
- Associated album: The Hunter
- Start date: July 23, 1982
- End date: August 21, 1982
- Legs: 1
- No. of shows: 19 in North America

Blondie concert chronology
- European Tour (1979–1980); Tracks Across America Tour '82 (1982); No Exit Tour (1998–1999)

The Tracks Across America Tour '82 was a concert tour by the American band Blondie in 1982. The tour supported their latest album, The Hunter (the first tour since their European Tour in 1979–1980) and would be Blondie's last tour before disbanding in late 1982. The band would reconvene in the late 1990s.

== Background ==
Though the tour nominally supported the album The Hunter, songs from Autoamerican (1980) also saw their first live performances as the band had not toured in support of that album. The non-album hit single "Call Me" and Debbie Harry's solo track "Chrome" were also performed live for the first time.

For the tour, guitarist Frank Infante was replaced with a session musician Eddie Martinez due to Infante's conflicting relationship with other band members. The tour also featured a horn section performing with the band.

Originally, the tour was supposed to have two legs, the second being in Europe with 41 dates in total, but the second leg was cancelled after slow ticket sales. Only 19 of the concerts (all in North America) were performed.

The show at the Exhibition Stadium in Toronto, Ontario, Canada, which took place an 18 August 1982, was recorded and filmed for the broadcast on HBO. Since then, it has been released several times as a semi-official live album and on video (both on VHS and DVD).

The tour turned out to be unsuccessful for Blondie with shows taking place at half-empty venues. Guitarist Chris Stein's health had been worsening during the tour. He was rapidly losing weight and shortly after the tour ended was diagnosed with pemphigus vulgaris, a rare autoimmune disease. Shortly afterwards, Blondie disbanded. They would not have any further live performances until a series of reunion concerts in 1997 and 1998.

== Opening acts ==
- Duran Duran: August 2, 4, 8, 14–18
- Elvis Costello and the Attractions, The Greg Kihn Band, Talk Talk & Sussman Lawrence on August 7 at the Parade Stadium in Minneapolis.
- David Johansen: August 14 at the Brendan Byrne Arena in East Rutherford, New Jersey.
- Blondie were third on the bill of an all-day stadium show on August 21 at John F. Kennedy Stadium in Philadelphia. The line-up that day consisted of Robert Hazard and the Heroes, A Flock of Seagulls, Blondie, Elvis Costello and the Attractions & Genesis.

== Set list ==
1. "Rapture"
2. "In the Sun"
3. "Sunday Girl"
4. "Little Caesar"
5. "Union City Blue"
6. "Chrome"
7. "Island of Lost Souls"
8. "Danceway"
9. "The Tide is High"
10. "Heart of Glass"
11. "Hanging On The Telephone"
12. "Dreaming"
13. "One Way or Another"
14. "War Child"
15. "Start Me Up" (The Rolling Stones cover)
16. "Call Me"

Notes

- Fab Five Freddy joined Blondie onstage on 14 August at the Meadowlands Sports Complex in East Rutherford, New Jersey.

== Tour dates ==
Date	City	Country	Venue
North America
July 22, 1982	Sunrise	United States	Sunrise Musical Theater
July 23, 1982	Baton Rouge	United States	LSU Assembly Center
July 24, 1982	Mobile	United States	Municipal Auditorium
July 25, 1982	Atlanta	United States	Six Flags Over Georgia
July 26, 1982	Lakeland	United States	Lakeland Civic Center
July 28, 1982	Pembroke Pines	United States	Hollywood Sportatorium
July 30, 1982	Memphis	United States	Mid-South Coliseum
August 2, 1982	Kansas City	United States	Starlight Theatre
August 4, 1982	Rockford	United States	Rockford MetroCentre
August 5, 1982	Cedar Rapids	United States	Five Seasons Center
August 7, 1982	Minneapolis	United States	Parade Stadium
August 8, 1982	Hoffman Estates	United States	Poplar Creek Music Theater
August 9, 1982	Clarkston	United States	Pine Knob Music Theatre
August 10, 1982	Cleveland	United States	Agora Theatre and Ballroom
August 12, 1982	Providence	United States	Providence Civic Center
August 13, 1982	Boston	United States	Boston Garden
August 14, 1982	East Rutherford	United States	Brendan Byrne Arena
August 16, 1982	Columbia	United States	Merriweather Post Pavilion
August 18, 1982	Toronto	Canada	Exhibition Stadium
August 21, 1982	Philadelphia	United States	John F. Kennedy Stadium

== Cancelled shows ==
Date	City	Country	Venue	Reason
North America
August 20-21, 1982	New York	United States	Madison Square Garden	Slow ticket sales
Europe
August 25, 1982	Bayonne	France	Arena de Bayonne	Slow ticket sales
August 27, 1982	Frejus	France	Arena de Frejus	Slow ticket sales
August 29, 1982	Marbella	Spain	Marbella Music Festival	Slow ticket sales
September 1, 1982	Glasgow	Scotland	The Apollo	Slow ticket sales
September 2, 1982	Glasgow	Scotland	The Apollo	Slow ticket sales
September 4, 1982	Edinburgh	Scotland	Edinburgh Playhouse	Slow ticket sales
September 5, 1982	Edinburgh	Scotland	Edinburgh Playhouse	Slow ticket sales
September 7, 1982	Newcastle	England	Newcastle City Hall	Slow ticket sales
September 8, 1982	Newcastle	England	Newcastle City Hall	Slow ticket sales
September 11, 1982	Birmingham	England	NEC Arena	Slow ticket sales
September 12, 1982	Birmingham	England	NEC Arena	Slow ticket sales
September 16, 1982	London	England	Wembley Arena	Slow ticket sales
September 17, 1982	London	England	Wembley Arena	Slow ticket sales
September 18, 1982	London	England	Wembley Arena	Slow ticket sales
September 19, 1982	London	England	Wembley Arena	Slow ticket sales
September 23, 1982	Copenhagen	Denmark	Grondbyhallen	Slow ticket sales
September 25, 1982	Stockholm	Sweden	Ice Stadium Stockholm	Slow ticket sales
September 26, 1982	Gothenburg	Sweden	Scandinavium	Slow ticket sales
September 29, 1982	Paris	France	Casino de Paris	Slow ticket sales

== Personnel ==
Blondie

- Debbie Harry – vocals
- Chris Stein – guitar
- Clem Burke – drums
- Jimmy Destri – keyboards
- Nigel Harrison – bass

Additional musicians

- Eddie Martinez – guitar
- Abel Domingues – keyboards
- Douglas Harris – horns
- Joseph Kohanski – horns
- Arthur Pugh – horns
