= For Your Eyes Only (soundtrack) =

Soundtrack album by Bill Conti
- Released: 1981
- Label: Liberty
- Producer: Bill Conti

Bill Conti chronology
The Formula (1980)	For Your Eyes Only (1981)	Victory (1981)

Singles from For Your Eyes Only
- 1. "For Your Eyes Only" Released: June 1981

Professional ratings
Review scores
Source	Rating
Allmusic	3.5/5 stars

For Your Eyes Only is the 1981 soundtrack for the 12th James Bond film of the same name.

The theme song was written by Bill Conti (music) and Michael Leeson (lyrics), and performed by Sheena Easton. The song was later nominated for both an Academy Award for Best Original Song at the 54th Academy Awards and Golden Globe Award for Best Original Song at the 39th Golden Globe Awards in 1982. Easton also made Bond film history as the first (and, to date, only) artist to perform the theme song on-screen during the opening title sequence.

Originally, the band Blondie was approached to write and perform the theme song for the film. They produced a song also called "For Your Eyes Only" that they turned in to the producers, however, this was rejected because the producers wanted the Conti song and the band refused, and subsequently asked Easton to record the entirely new theme. Blondie eventually released their song on the 1982 album The Hunter. The track "Make It Last All Night", performed by Rage and used for the scene at hitman Hector Gonzales (Stefan Kalipha)'s Spanish poolside, is notable for lyrics more suggestive than in almost any other Bond film.

The soundtrack was composed by Bill Conti, since the series' regular composer, John Barry, was unable to work in the UK for tax reasons (he, like many high earning Britons, had become a tax exile in the 1970s). Barry had recommended Conti as a possible alternative. Conti's score is notable for its use of disco elements (which prompted Danny Biederman to write in the liner notes to the two-CD release The Best of James Bond: 30th Anniversary Limited Edition, "Conti's largely disco-styled score feels more like a celebration of the music of the moment than a score of durability"). During the main ski chase sequence (the track "Runaway"), Conti showed that he had versed himself in the previous Bond films' music, as his manages to evoke memories of the music from previous ski action in both On Her Majesty's Secret Service (1969) and The Spy Who Loved Me (1977). This, Conti's only contribution to the series to date, was released as an album concurrent with the film's release and later on a bootleg compact disc in combination with John Barry's music from Octopussy. When the soundtrack was officially released on CD in the year 2000, six bonus tracks were added that further showed Conti's versatile approach to the film, aiding the production in its return to a tougher, more realistic James Bond. Not released but also heard in the film is a brief homage to John Williams' familiar theme from Jaws (1975), when an unseen underwater horror (it is revealed to be an attacker (Graham Hawkes) in a JIM diving suit) approaches within the sunken ship. This was the third Bond film in a row to wittily include familiar music from a classic film. Additionally, notes from the title song to The Spy Who Loved Me, "Nobody Does It Better", can be heard as the tones of a key code for a security door early in the film.

== Track listing ==
1. "For Your Eyes Only" – Sheena Easton (lyrics by Michael Leeson)
2. "A Drive in the Country" (Note: contains the "James Bond Theme", originally composed for the Dr. No soundtrack)
3. "Take Me Home" – Flügelhorn solo: Eddie Blair
4. "Melina's Revenge"
5. "Gonzales Takes a Dive"
6. "St. Cyril's Monastery"
7. "Make It Last All Night" – Rage (lyrics by Shelby Conti and Chris West)
8. "Runaway"
9. "Submarine"
10. "For Your Eyes Only (Instrumental)" – Flügelhorn solo: Derek Watkins
11. "Cortina"
12. "The P.M. Gets the Bird / For Your Eyes Only (Reprise)" – Sheena Easton
13. "Gunbarrel / Flowers for Teresa / Sinking the St. Georges"
14. "Unfinished Business / Bond Meets Kristatos"
15. "Ski...Shoot...Jump..."
16. "Goodbye, Countess / No Head for Heights / Dining Alone"
17. "Recovering the ATAC"
18. "Sub vs. Sub"
19. "Run Them Down / The Climb"

== Chart positions ==
Chart (1981/82)	Peak position
Australia (Kent Music Report)	74
Austrian Albums (Ö3 Austria)	16
Norwegian Albums (VG-lista)	15
Swedish Albums (Sverigetopplistan)	25
US Billboard 200	84

== See also ==
- Outline of James Bond
