= John F. Kennedy Stadium =

Former open-air stadium in Philadelphia

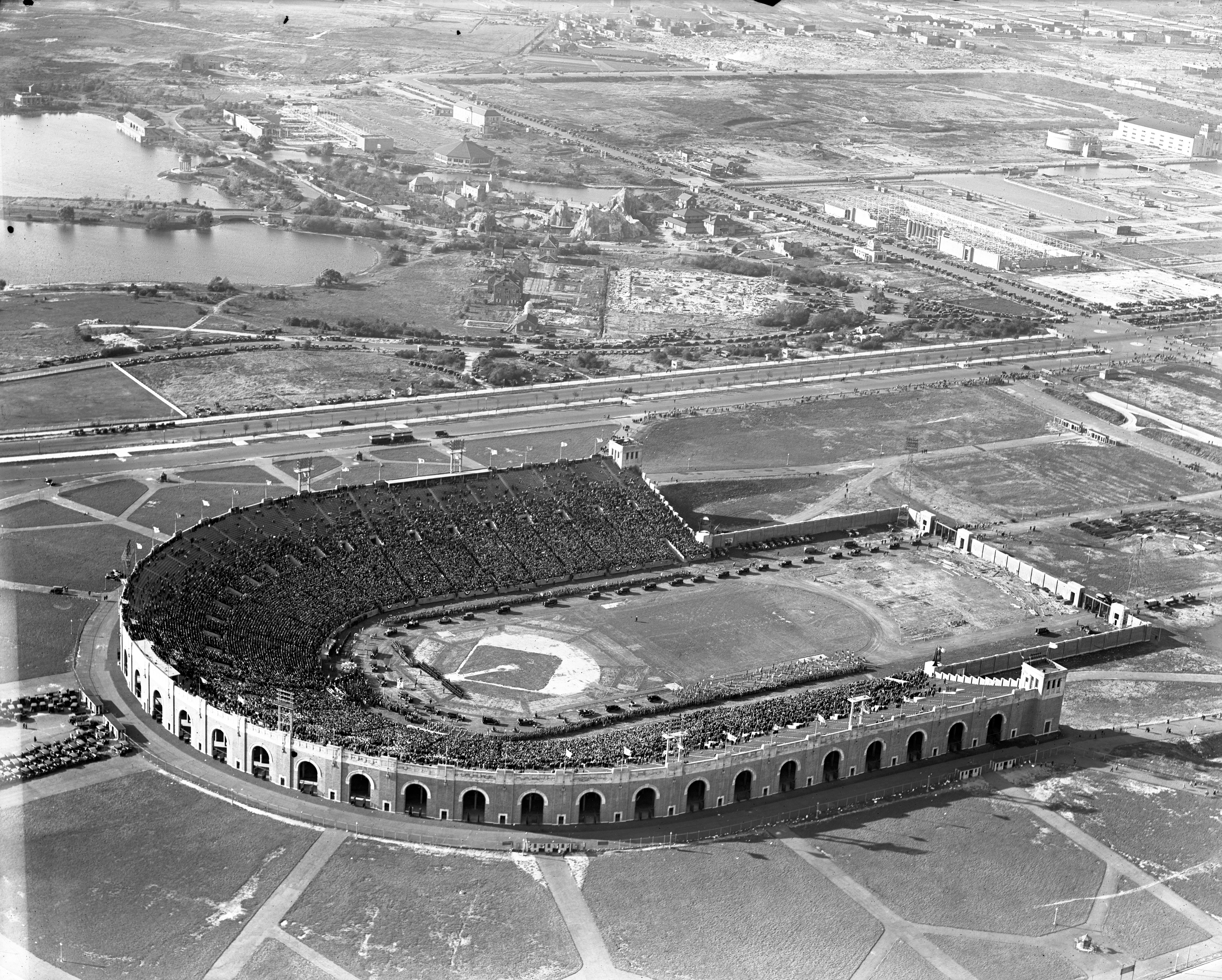
- Philadelphia Municipal Stadium in 1927
- Interactive map of John F. Kennedy Stadium
- Former names: Sesquicentennial Stadium (1926); Philadelphia Municipal Stadium (1926–1964); John F. Kennedy Stadium (1964–1992)
- Address: South Broad Street, Philadelphia, Pennsylvania, U.S.
- Location: Philadelphia, Pennsylvania
- Coordinates: 39.9010°N 75.1720°W
- Owner: City of Philadelphia
- Capacity: 102,000 (for American football)
- Surface: Grass

Construction
- Opened: April 15, 1926
- Closed: July 13, 1989
- Demolished: September 19–24, 1992
- Architects: Simon & Simon

Tenants
- Philadelphia Quakers (AFL) (1926); Philadelphia Eagles (NFL) (1936–1939, 1941); Army–Navy Game (NCAA) (1936–1979); Liberty Bowl (NCAA) (1959–1963); Philadelphia Bell (WFL) (1974)

John F. Kennedy Stadium, formerly Philadelphia Municipal Stadium and Sesquicentennial Stadium, was an open-air stadium in Philadelphia that stood from 1926 to 1992. It was built of concrete, stone, and brick on a 13.5-acre (55,000 m^{2}) tract in South Philadelphia. It was located at the east side of the far southern end of Broad Street, as part of the Sesquicentennial, at a location which is now part of the South Philadelphia Sports Complex. It was designed by the architectural firm of Simon & Simon in a classic 1920s horseshoe shape resembling Harvard Stadium, which was built in 1903. The seating enclosed a football field surrounded by a running track. Bleachers were eventually added to the open (North) end of the stadium and at its peak the facility seated in excess of 102,000 people.

Each section of the main portion of the stadium contained its own entrance, which displayed the letters of each section above the entrance, in a nod to ancient Roman stadia. Section designators were divided at the south end of the stadium (the bottom of the "U" shape) between West and East, starting with Sections WA and EA and proceeding north. The north bleachers started with Section NA.

== Opening and names ==
Leaders of Philadelphia's sports organizations gathered at the Philadelphia Chamber of Commerce in March 1920 and announced their intention to build a 200,000 seat sports stadium to attract national and international sporting events. The city immediately submitted its candidacy to host the 1924 Summer Olympics. At the time, the University of Pennsylvania's Franklin Field was the city's largest ballpark with a capacity of 30,000 seats; the Philadelphia Athletics' Shibe Park sat 23,000, and the Phillies' National League Park sat 18,000. The initial meeting in 1920 favored building the stadium as a memorial to the nation's war dead and placing it in Fairmount Park at its entrance to the Benjamin Franklin Parkway.

The stadium was built as part of the 1926 Sesquicentennial International Exposition. Originally known as Sesquicentennial Stadium when it opened April 15, 1926, the structure was renamed Philadelphia Municipal Stadium after the Exposition's closing ceremonies. In 1964, it was renamed John F. Kennedy Stadium in memory of the 35th President of the United States who had been assassinated the year before in Dallas.

== Football ==
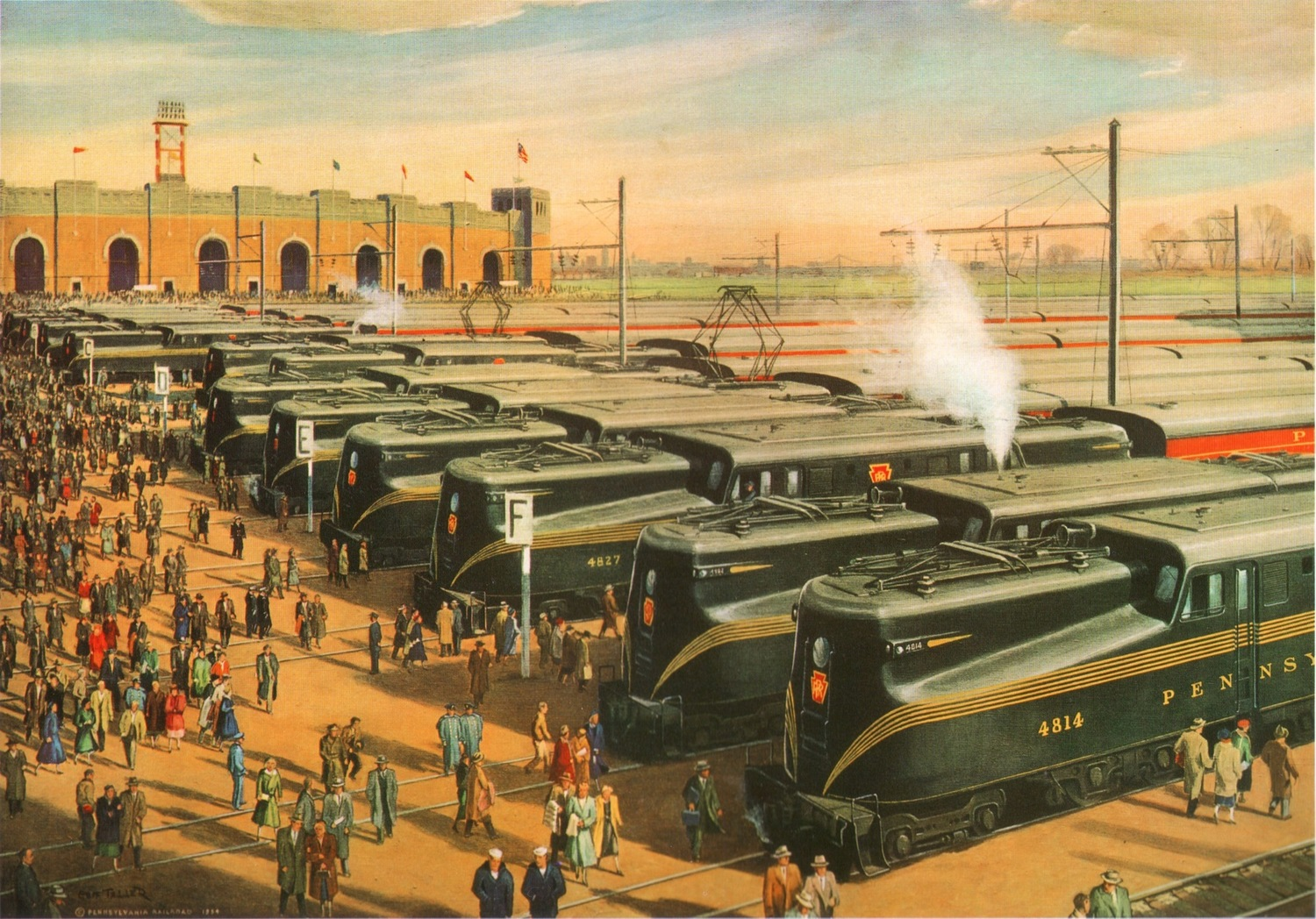
Pennsylvania Railroad trains lined up at a temporary station outside the stadium after the 1955 Army–Navy Game

The stadium's first tenants (in 1926) were the Philadelphia Quakers of the first American Football League, whose Saturday afternoon home games were a popular mainstay of the Exposition. The Quakers won the league championship but the league folded after one year.

The Frankford Yellow Jackets also played here intermittently until the team's demise in 1931. Two years later, the National Football League awarded another team to the city, the Philadelphia Eagles. The Eagles had a four-season stint as tenants of the stadium before moving to Shibe Park for the 1940 season, although the team did play at Municipal in 1941. The Eagles also used the stadium for practices in the 1970s and 1980s, even locating their first practice bubble there before moving it to the Veterans Stadium parking lot following the stadium's condemnation.

The stadium became known chiefly as the "neutral" venue for a total of 41 annual Army–Navy Games played there between 1936 and 1979. The streak was briefly broken during World War II, when travel restrictions forced three games to be held on campus and one game to be played in Baltimore. From 1960 to 1970 the stadium served as Navy's home field when they played Notre Dame. It also hosted the Notre Dame-Army game in 1957, marking the only time the Cadets have hosted the Fighting Irish outside of New York or New Jersey. The Pennsylvania Railroad and its successors, Penn Central and Conrail, offered game-day service to all Army-Navy games, using a sprawling temporary station constructed each year on the railroad's nearby Greenwich freight yard. The service, with 40-odd trains serving as many as 30,000 attendees, was the single largest concentrated passenger rail movement in the country.

A.F. "Bud" Dudley, a former Villanova University athletic-director, created the Liberty Bowl in Philadelphia in 1959. The game was played at Municipal Stadium and was the only cold-weather bowl game of its time. It was plagued by poor attendance; the 1963 game between Mississippi State and NC State drew less than 10,000 fans and absorbed a loss in excess of $40,000. The Liberty Bowl's best game was its first in 1959, when 38,000 fans watched Penn State beat Alabama 7–0. However, even that crowd was swallowed up in the environment. Atlantic City convinced Dudley to move his game from Philadelphia to Atlantic City's Convention Hall for 1964. 6,059 fans saw Utah rout West Virginia in the first indoor bowl game. Dudley moved the game to Memphis in 1965 where it has been played since.

The stadium hosted Philadelphia's City Title high school football championship game in 1939 and 1978. St. Joe's Prep defeated Northeast, 27–6, in 1939. Frankford beat Archbishop Wood, 27–7, in heavy rain in 1978.

On September 16, 1950, the Cleveland Browns, playing their first season in the NFL after dominating the defunct All-America Football Conference (winning all four league titles), played their first NFL game against the two-time defending NFL Champion Philadelphia Eagles as a prelude to what would eventually in time become the NFL kickoff game. Philadelphia was the center of the professional football universe at the time; not only did the city host the defending NFL champions, but the league offices were also in town, headed up by NFL commissioner (and Philadelphia native) Bert Bell. To accommodate the anticipated ticket demand, the game was moved from Shibe Park; this proved to be a wise decision, as the contest drew a then NFL-record 71,237 — virtually doubling the Eagles' prior attendance record of 38,230. Many thought Bell had scheduled this game of defending league champions to teach the upstarts from the AAFC a lesson. Instead, the Browns shredded the Eagles' vaunted defense in a 35–10 rout and went on to win the NFL Championship that first year in the league.

In 1958, some 15,000 fans attended a CFL game between the Hamilton Tiger-Cats and the Ottawa Rough Riders with proceeds from ticket sales going to local charities. (Hamilton won, 24–18, in what remains the only regular-season CFL game played between two Canadian teams outside of Canada.)

The stadium was home to the Philadelphia Bell of the World Football League in 1974. The Bell seemed to give the WFL instant credibility when it announced a crowd of 55,534 for the home opener, and 64,719 for the second home game. However, when the Bell paid city taxes on the attendance figures two weeks later, it emerged that the gates had been wildly inflated. The team sold block tickets to area businesses at a discount, and the tax revenue was not reported. In turn, many of these businesses gave away the tickets for free. The actual paid attendance for the home opener was only 13,855, while the paid attendance for the second game was only 6,200—and many of those tickets were sold well below face value. The "Papergate" scandal made the Bell and the WFL look foolish, and proved to be a humiliation from which neither recovered. The team played at Franklin Field in 1975; the league folded late into that season.

== Other sports ==
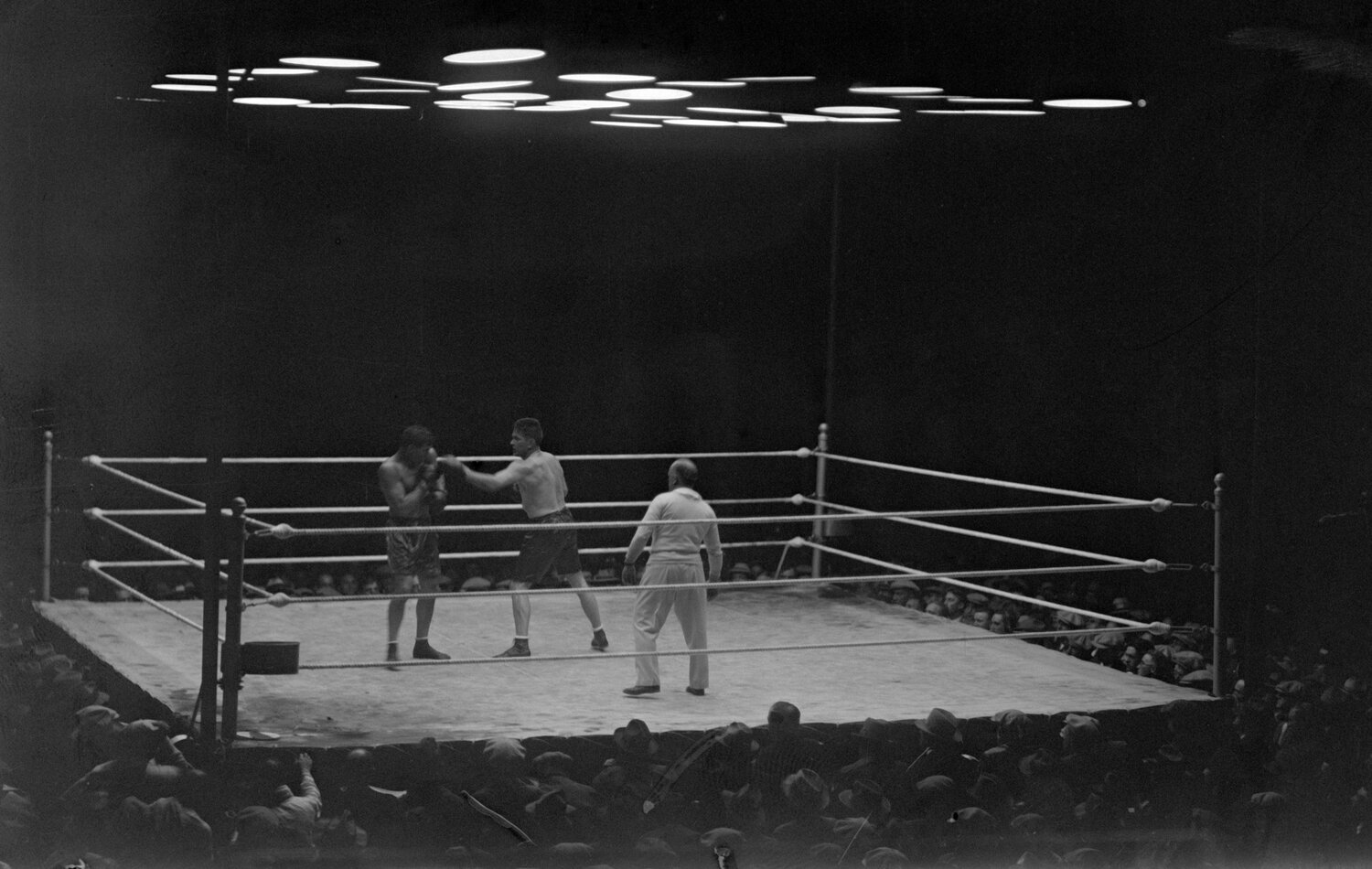
Tunney-Dempsey on September 23, 1926, at Sesquicentennial Stadium in Philadelphia

On September 23, 1926, an announced crowd of 120,557 packed the then-new Stadium during a rainstorm to witness Gene Tunney capture the world heavyweight boxing title from Jack Dempsey. Undefeated Rocky Marciano knocked out Jersey Joe Walcott at the stadium on September 23, 1952, to win boxing's heavyweight championship.

In August 1950, as the Philadelphia Phillies appeared headed for the National League pennant, Philadelphia's City Council passed a resolution directing the city's director of public works to explore the availability of Municipal Stadium to the Phillies for the World Series. The stadium had been used for baseball at its opening in 1926 and would offer 100,000 capacity, three times the capacity of Shibe Park.

On June 26, 1957, a 150-lap NASCAR convertible race was held at the Stadium, which was won by Bob Welborn in a 1957 Chevrolet.

JFK Stadium hosted Team America's soccer match against England on May 31, 1976, as part of the 1976 U.S.A. Bicentennial Cup Tournament. In the game, England defeated Team America, 3–1, in front of a small crowd of 16,239. England and Italy had failed to qualify for the 1976 European Championship final tournament and so they joined Brazil and Team America, composed of international stars playing in the North American Soccer League, in the four team competition. Because Team America was composed of international players and was not the American national team, the Football Association does not regard England's match against Team America as an official international match.

JFK Stadium was one of fifteen United States stadiums (and along with Franklin Field, also in Philadelphia) inspected by a five-member FIFA committee in April 1988 in the evaluation of the United States as a possible host of the 1994 FIFA World Cup. By the time the World Cup was held in 1994, JFK Stadium had already been demolished two years prior.

== Other events ==
The Philadelphia Flyers won their second Stanley Cup on May 27, 1975. The next day they celebrated with a parade down Broad Street that ended at the stadium. Five years later, the Philadelphia Phillies won their first World Series on October 21 of that year. The following day, the team paraded the exact route. In 1981, The Rolling Stones announced their World Tour via a press conference at JFK. Through 1989, the Broad Street Run course ended with a lap around the track at the stadium.

== Concerts ==
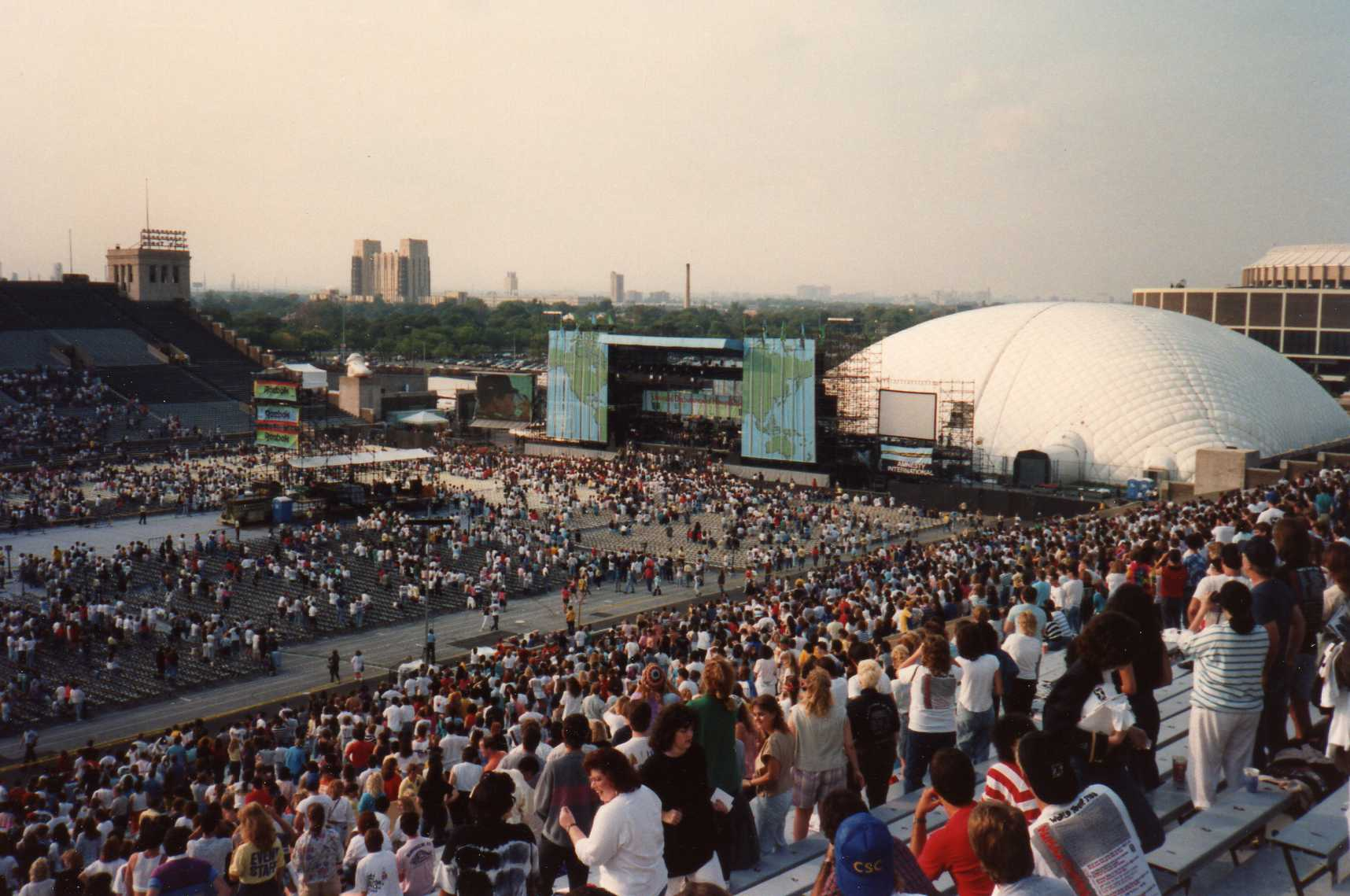
JFK Stadium holding one of Amnesty International's Human Rights Now! concerts on September 19, 1988

JFK Stadium was known for hosting some of the largest and most prominent rock music acts of the late 20th century, including (but by no means limited to):

=== 1960s ===
- September 10, 1965: The Supremes performed at the stadium.
- August 16, 1966: The Beatles played their second and final Philadelphia concert here.
- July 20, 1968: Judy Garland performed her last concert in the U.S., singing in part with the Count Basie band.

=== 1970s ===
- June 12, 1976: Yes, Peter Frampton, Gary Wright, and others played the "1976 Bicentennial Concert" at the stadium.
- August 13, 1977: Led Zeppelin was scheduled to conclude their 1977 North American tour at the stadium, but the final five concerts of the tour were cancelled following the death of Robert Plant's five-year-old son Karac. The original Led Zeppelin never played in the U.S. again, although the surviving members, including Plant, Jimmy Page, and John Paul Jones (drummer John Bonham died in 1980 from pulmonary aspiration following excessive alcohol intake) reunited to perform at Live Aid at John F. Kennedy Stadium on July 13, 1985.
- June 11, 1977: Peter Frampton returned from a seven-month lay-off and played at the stadium accompanied by Lynyrd Skynyrd, The J. Geils Band, Dickey Betts, and Great Southern, before 91,000 fans, on June 11, 1977.
- June 17, 1978: The Rolling Stones performed in front of 90,000 fans during the fifth concert of their 1978 U.S. tour following release of their album, Some Girls. Opening acts included Bob Marley's former bandmate Peter Tosh and Foreigner.
- July 30, 1978: An all-day concert was held at the stadium, featuring Sanford-Townsend Band, Bob Welch, Steve Miller Band, and Fleetwood Mac. Bob Welch and Steve Miller sets were marred by public address system problems. The Fleetwood Mac set was marred by the unreliable vocals of Stevie Nicks, who was disinterested at best and off-key or off-tempo at worst. The rest of the band was strong, however, especially Lindsey Buckingham's guitar work and Christine McVie's vocals.

=== 1980s ===
- June 20, 1981: An all-day concert called The Roundup started at 10am, including southern rock bands .38 Special, the Marshall Tucker Band, Molly Hatchet, The Outlaws, and the Allman Brothers.
- September 25 and 26, 1981: The Rolling Stones opened their 1981 U.S. Tour in support of their new album Tattoo You with two shows at JFK Stadium, in front of 90,000 fans each night. Opening acts included Journey and George Thorogood & the Destroyerss. Mick Jagger met the press at JFK Stadium on August 26, 1981, to announce the tour. Apparently in honor of the old stadium's football heritage and the Philadelphia Eagles' recent NFC championship, Jagger performed in something resembling a pair of football trousers and knee pads and a Philadelphia Eagles jersey that became part of his stage wardrobe for the rest of the tour. The Rolling Stones pre-opened the tour with a warm-up show at the Sir Morgan's Cove club in Worcester, Massachusetts, on September 14, 1981.
- June 19, 1982: An all-day festival called the J.F.K jam featured Huey Lewis & the News, Joan Jett and the Black Hearts, Loverboy, The Kinks and headliner Foreigner, who were touring their 6×-platinum "4" album and inflated a colorful, 30-foot-high facsimile of a Wurlitzer-style jukebox as they performed "Juke Box Hero" in the show's final minutes.
- July 3, 1982: Rick James performed a concert called "The Throwdown in Phillytown", which also featured Frankie Beverly and Maze, Kool and the Gang, Atlantic Starr, and One Way featuring Al Hudson.
- August 21, 1982: Blondie concluded their Tracks Across America Tour at the stadium. They disbanded shortly after it when guitarist Chris Stein was diagnosed with a rare life-threatening disease known as pemphigus; the band's final album, The Hunter, had also sold poorly. They did not perform live again until 15 years later, in 1997. Genesis was the headliner and used the open air stadium for one of their spectacular nighttime laser and fireworks shows. The show started at 3pm and also featured Elvis Costello & The Attractions, A Flock of Seagulls, and Robert Hazard & The Heroes.
- September 25, 1982: The Who performed at the stadium early in what was then labeled their Farewell Tour, which also supported their album It's Hard. Opening acts were Santana, The Clash, and The Hooters. Total attendance was 91,451, one of the largest ticketed single-show, non-festival stadium concerts ever held in the U.S., according to Billboard.
- June 4, 1983: Journey headlined a concert that also featured Bryan Adams, The Tubes, Sammy Hagar, and John Cougar. This show provided the majority of the concert footage for the NFL Films documentary, Journey, Frontiers and Beyond.
- August 20, 1983: The Police headlined a festival with opening acts R.E.M., Madness, and Joan Jett.
- September 1984: The Jacksons performed at the stadium for four sold-out shows during their Victory Tour with 200,000 in attendance, one of the largest audiences of the tour.
- July 13, 1985: Live Aid, a dual-venue concert at JFK stadium in Philadelphia (attended by 89,484 people) and Wembley Stadium in London (attended by 72,000 people). Musical acts that appeared at JFK included Duran Duran, Madonna, Simple Minds, The Beach Boys, Tom Petty and the Heartbreakers, REO Speedwagon, The Hooters, Bryan Adams, Eric Clapton, The Cars, Black Sabbath, Run-DMC, Judas Priest, Hall & Oates, the surviving members of Led Zeppelin, Crosby, Stills, Nash, & Young, Tina Turner, Bob Dylan, Mick Jagger, Keith Richards, and Ronnie Wood, of The Rolling Stones, and dual appearances by Phil Collins, who performed first at Wembley, traveled by helicopter to Heathrow Airport, flew to Philadelphia via Concorde, and performed at JFK.
- July 10, 1987: Bob Dylan and The Grateful Dead performed in front of 70,000-plus on a day when it was 90 °F in the shade and fans near the stage were sprayed with water.
- September 19, 1987: Pink Floyd performed at the stadium in front of a crowd of over 120,000, which included general admission on the field, and the show was still not sold out to full capacity.
- September 25, 1987: U2 performed at the stadium during their Joshua Tree Tour in front of a crowd of 86,145. Bruce Springsteen performed Stand By Me with U2 as an encore. Steven Van Zandt was the opening act.
- June 11, 1988: The Monsters of Rock Tour featuring Van Halen, the Scorpions, Dokken, Metallica, and Kingdom Come, was held at the stadium.
- September 19, 1988: Amnesty International's Human Rights Now! benefit concert was held at the stadium with approximately 80,000 attendees. The show was headlined by Bruce Springsteen and the E Street Band with opening acts Sting, Tracy Chapman, Peter Gabriel, Youssou N'Dour, and Joan Baez.
- July 7, 1989: The stadium's last concert was Grateful Dead with Bruce Hornsby & The Range as the opening act. Fans at the show recall concrete crumbling and the stadium's bathrooms in poor shape. The Dead closed the show with "Knockin' on Heaven's Door", which proved to be the last live song played at the last official performance in the stadium. Twenty-one years later, in 2010, the recording of this concert was released on a CD/DVD combination, titled Crimson White & Indigo.
- August 28 and 29, 1989: In preparation for opening their 1989 Steel Wheels Tour at Veterans Stadium in Philadelphia on August 31, 1989, The Rolling Stones set up their stage inside JFK Stadium for two full dress-rehearsal performances on August 28 and 29, 1989. A few dozen fans were allowed to enter the stadium to attend these rehearsals.

== Closing and demolition ==
Six days after the Grateful Dead's 1989 show, Mayor Wilson Goode condemned the stadium due to multiple findings by city inspectors that the stadium was structurally unsafe as well as a potential fire hazard. Just hours before the concert, city inspectors had discovered piles of combustible materials, numerous electrical problems, and crumbling and/or falling concrete. By this time, some 20,000 people were already in the stadium, with another 20,000 in line waiting to enter. The Grateful Dead were only allowed to perform due to strict no-smoking regulations that had been enacted some time before.

While renovation and repairs of the stadium were discussed, this was quickly rejected due to the exceedingly high costs, and it was demolished on September 23, 1992.

The 1993 Philadelphia stop for the Lollapalooza music festival was held at the JFK Stadium site on July 18, 1993. The site was an open field, as construction had not yet begun on the then still tentatively named "Spectrum II" (now Xfinity Mobile Arena). This was the show at which Rage Against the Machine stood on stage without playing in protest of the Parents Music Resource Center.

Xfinity Mobile Arena now stands on the site. The arena is part of the Sports Complex that also includes Lincoln Financial Field and Citizens Bank Park.

== See also ==
- List of things named after John F. Kennedy

Preceded by Baker Bowl; Shibe Park	Home of the Philadelphia Eagles; 1936 – 1939; 1941	Succeeded by Shibe Park
Preceded by first stadium	Home of the Liberty Bowl; 1959 – 1963	Succeeded by Atlantic City Convention Hall
