= For Your Eyes Only (song) =

- Standard UK/European and Brazilian picture sleeve

Single by Sheena Easton

from the album For Your Eyes Only
- B-side: "For Your Eyes Only" (instrumental)
- Released: 15 June 1981
- Recorded: 1981
- Genre: Pop, soft rock
- Length: 3:04; 2:54 (7")
- Label: Liberty (original), RT Industries (current)
- Composer: Bill Conti
- Lyricist: Mick Leeson
- Producer: Christopher Neil

Sheena Easton singles chronology
"When He Shines" (1981)	"For Your Eyes Only" (1981)	"Just Another Broken Heart" (1981)

James Bond theme singles chronology
"Moonraker" (1979)	"For Your Eyes Only" (1981)	"All Time High" (1983)

Official audio
- "For Your Eyes Only" on YouTube

Audio sample
- file; help

"For Your Eyes Only" is the 1981 theme to the 12th James Bond movie of the same name, written by Bill Conti and Mick Leeson, and performed by Scottish singer Sheena Easton for the accompanying soundtrack album. The song reached number four on the US Billboard Hot 100, and number eight on the UK singles chart. It was nominated for an Academy Award for Best Original Song at the 54th Academy Awards and Golden Globe Award for Best Original Song at the 39th Golden Globe Awards in 1982.

== Background ==
Bill Conti – who was also responsible for the film For Your Eyes Only's score – had originally written the song thinking about Donna Summer or Dusty Springfield, singers he thought "fit the Bond style". Film studio United Artists suggested Sheena Easton, an up-and-coming singer who had recently scored a Billboard Hot 100 number one hit in America with "Morning Train". Conti heard Easton's 1981 debut album Take My Time and felt unimpressed but decided to work with her in the song after meeting Easton in person.

Mick Leeson's lyrics originally used "for your eyes only" only as the final line, as the lyricist felt he could only use the phrase as a conclusion. After credit sequence artist Maurice Binder complained about having to synchronize the unveiling of the title with it being said in the theme song, Conti decided to work with Leeson to write lyrics that opened with "for your eyes only". The US band Blondie had previously been asked to write the title song but it was rejected in favour of Conti's by the Bond producers. (Blondie's recording of a completely different song, also called "For Your Eyes Only", appeared on their 1982 album The Hunter).

== Release ==
Easton is the only artist (to date) to be seen singing the theme song to a Bond movie during its opening titles, as Maurice Binder liked Easton's appearance and decided to add her to the credits. Her seductive appearance in these clips was, according to Roger Moore, sexier than any of the Bond girls, although Easton herself states that the filming process was very unglamorous. In particular, Binder had to attach Easton to a chair so she would be immobile during a take where the camera zooms on the singer's lips.

This was one of the few Bond themes not to have a contribution by John Barry. The song was produced by Christopher Neil, who was Easton's regular producer at the time. The song was released as a single in June 1981, at the same time as the film's launch. It became a worldwide hit, reaching the top ten on the UK Singles Chart, number 1 in the Netherlands and top five in the US. It remains one of Easton's biggest hits and is included on compilation soundtrack albums.

== Reception ==
Record World said that Easton's vocal shows "overwhelming vocal range and power."

== Music video ==
Two different music videos for the song were released. The first was the Maurice Binder title sequence from the film, but with the credits removed (therefore just showing Easton performing the song). The second was a live version with Easton from her television special Act One (1983) and was directed by Steve Barron.

== Chart history ==
=== Weekly charts ===
Chart (1981)	Peak position
Australian (Kent Music Report)	6
Austria (Ö3 Austria Top 40)	3
Belgium (Ultratop 50 Flanders)	5
Canada Top Singles (RPM)	5
French Singles Chart	4
Germany (GfK)	5
Ireland (IRMA)	11
Japan Singles Chart (Oricon)	22
Luxembourg (Radio Luxembourg)	10
Netherlands (Dutch Top 40)	1
Netherlands (Single Top 100)	1
New Zealand (Recorded Music NZ)	4
Norway (VG-lista)	1
Spain (AFYVE)	11
Sweden (Sverigetopplistan)	3
Switzerland (Schweizer Hitparade)	1
UK Singles (Official Charts)	8
US Billboard Hot 100	4
US Adult Contemporary (Billboard)	6
US Cash Box Top 100	3

=== Year-end charts ===
Chart (1981)	Rank
Canada	36
Switzerland	4
US Top Pop Singles (Billboard)	92
US Adult Contemporary (Billboard)	33
US Cash Box	28

Chart (1982)	Rank
Australia (Kent Music Report)	39

== See also ==
- James Bond music
- Outline of James Bond
