= Island of Lost Souls =

Island of Lost Souls may refer to

- Island of Lost Souls (1932 film), a movie featuring Charles Laughton and Bela Lugosi
- Island of Lost Souls (2007 film), a Danish film by director Nikolaj Arcel
- "Island of Lost Souls" (song), 1982 single by Blondie
