= Dry for wet =

Film technique

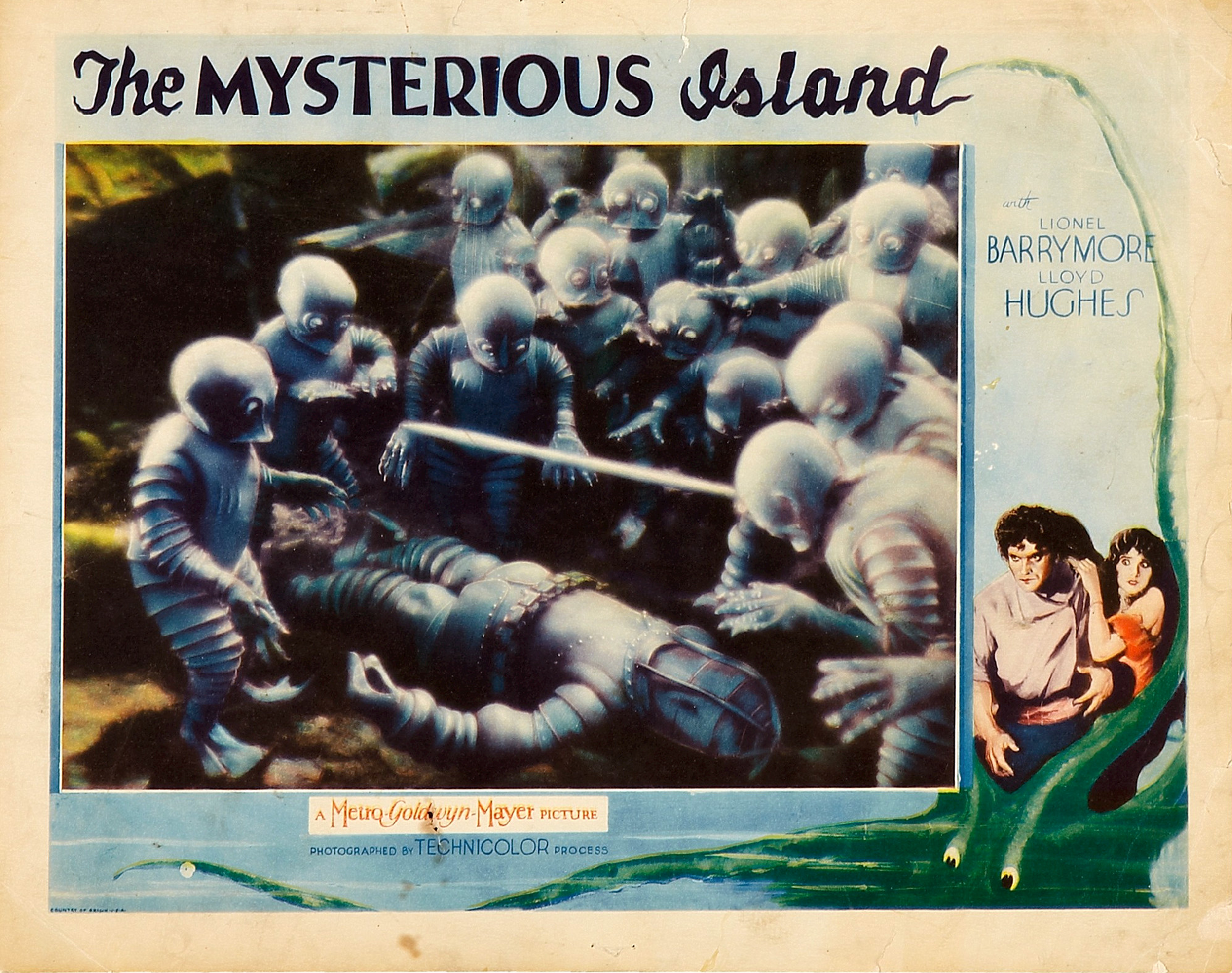
Lobby card for The Mysterious Island.

Dry for wet is a film technique in which smoke, colored filters, and/or lighting effects are used to simulate a character being underwater while filming on a dry stage. Fans and slow motion can be used to make hair or clothing appear to float in the current. In recent years, it has become possible to digitally add rising bubbles in post-production, heightening the realism.

== History ==
The technique was pioneered by Georges Méliès who would use a painted backdrop to suggest an underwater environment. By the mid-20th century, it had become a reliable technique that was used extensively in productions like 20,000 Leagues Under the Sea and Voyage to the Bottom of the Sea.

== Examples ==
- The underwater scenes featuring the monster in the original Godzilla (with this footage reused in the Americanization that followed two years later) were filmed with a full aquarium between the camera and Haruo Nakajima, the actor playing Godzilla.
- Guillermo Del Toro's 2017 film The Shape of Water uses this technique throughout, the first instance being the introduction sequence of the film.
- The technique is in use in the final scene of The Lord of the Rings: The Fellowship of the Ring when Sam sinks into the River Anduin. It is also used in The Lord of the Rings: The Two Towers when Frodo falls into the Dead Marshes.
- In the underwater scooter scene in Lara Croft Tomb Raider: The Cradle of Life.
- In A.I. Artificial Intelligence the technique was used for the scenes with the submerged attractions at Coney Island.
- Many underwater scenes in For Your Eyes Only were shot this way due to a medical condition actress Carole Bouquet suffered that precluded her from doing any underwater stunt work.
- The exterior shots of the submerged Red October in the film The Hunt for Red October were also achieved using this technique, with a model hung by wires that could be tilted and turned in three dimensions.
- Tony Scott hoped to film Crimson Tide underwater but ended up relying on dry-for-wet for everything except torpedoes firing.
- James Cameron used the technique in Titanic to match the footage he had personally shot at the wreckage site with the submarine models that appear in the film.
- The technique was used in many underwater scenes in The Spirit.
- Much of the model (and occasional puppet) work for Stingray TV series was done using the technique (Stingray was a submarine, so many shots showed it underwater). Many scenes were filmed through a narrow fish tank containing small fish that would appear swimming in front of the model; bubbles could also be created in the tank to complete the illusion with no post-production effort required.
- Aquaman relied heavily on this technique. Industrial Light & Magic updated their HairCraft software specifically to look like the actors were underwater.

== See also ==
- Day for night
