= Grand Hotel Miramonti =

Hotel in Cortina d'Ampezzo, Italy

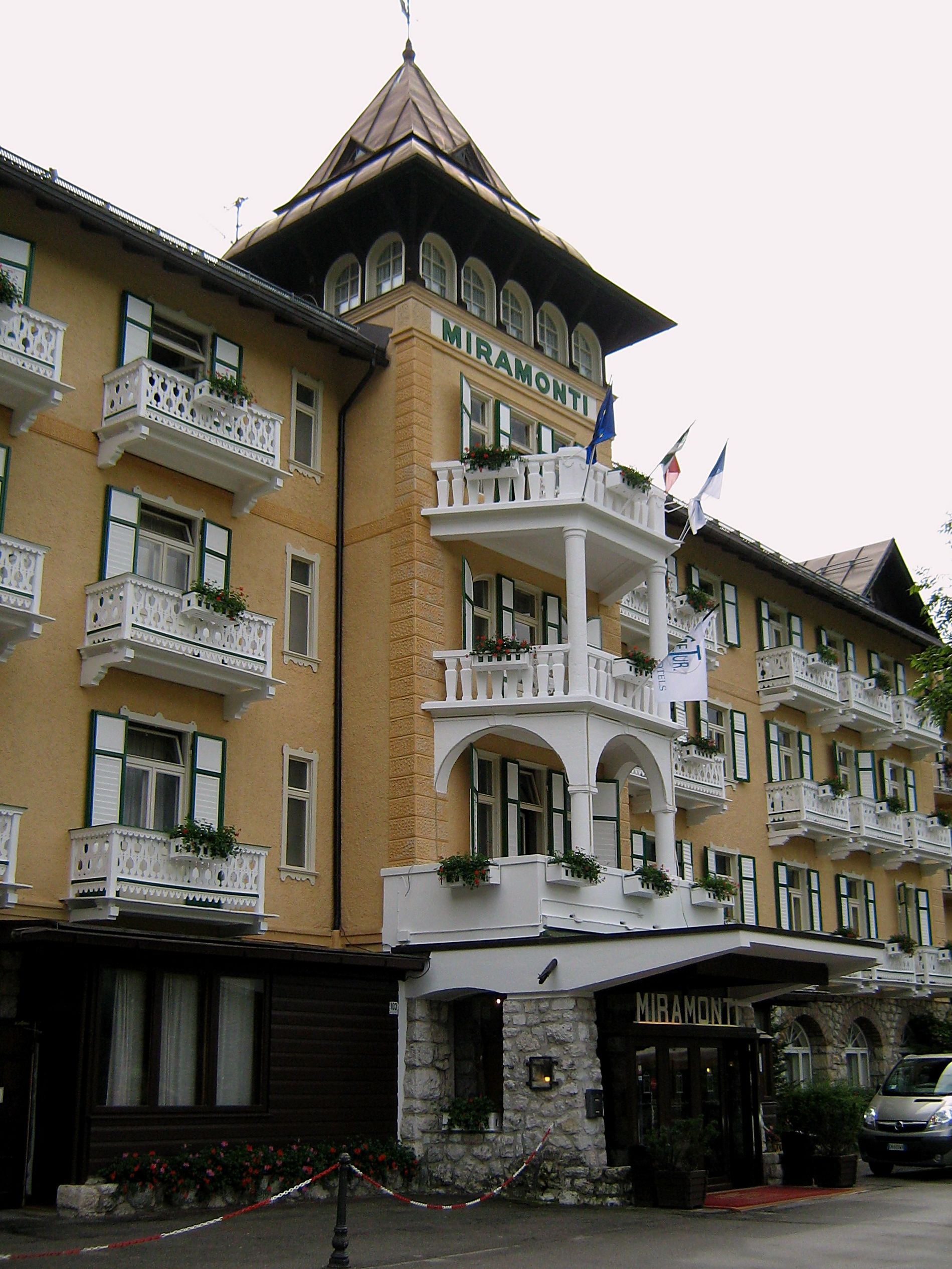
- The Grand Hotel Miramonti in 2012
- Interactive map of the Grand Hotel Miramonti area

General information
- Location: Cortina d'Ampezzo, Italy
- Coordinates: 46°31′17.04″N 12°08′37.75″E
- Opened: 1906; 120 years ago

The Grand Hotel Miramonti is a historic luxury hotel located in Cortina d'Ampezzo in the Dolomites, Italy.

== History ==
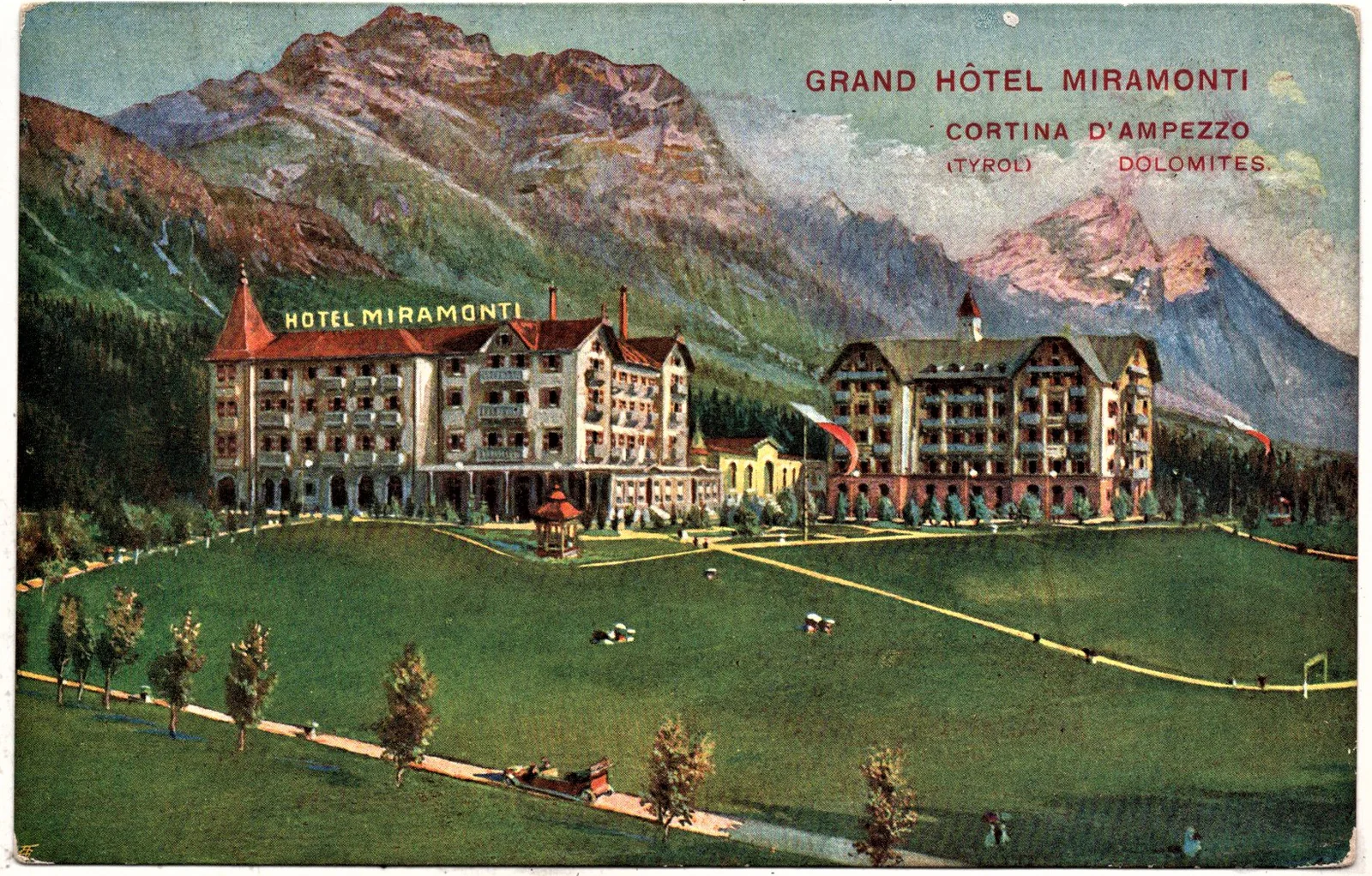
Vintage view

The hotel was built in 1906 by Romeo Mainago and his wife Filomena. Already in the first half of the 20th century, the hotel became a destination for prominent figures, hosting Emperor Franz Joseph I, Umberto II of Italy, Rainier III of Monaco, Alfonso of Bourbon, the Shah of Persia, and King Farouk of Egypt. In the following years, Hotel Miramonti became one of the favorite destinations for numerous celebrities from Hollywood and Cinecittà during the Dolce Vita age, counting among its distinguished guests Ingrid Bergman, Clark Gable, Peter Sellers, Brigitte Bardot, Sophia Loren, Gina Lollobrigida, Marcello Mastroianni, and Alberto Sordi.

The hotel served as a filming location for several scenes of the 1981 James Bond movie For Your Eyes Only.
