= War Child (song) =

Single by Blondie

from the album The Hunter
- B-side: "Little Caesar"; "War Child [Extended Version]"
- Released: 12 July 1982
- Recorded: 1982
- Genre: Dance-rock
- Length: 4:01
- Label: Chrysalis (UK)
- Songwriters: Deborah Harry; Nigel Harrison
- Producer: Mike Chapman

Blondie singles chronology
"Island Of Lost Souls" (1982)	"War Child" (1982)	"Maria" (1999)

"War Child" is a 1982 song by the American rock band Blondie, featured on their sixth studio album The Hunter. The song was released as a second single from the album in various countries, but not in the band's native US. There is no music video for this single.

== Single information ==
"War Child" was written by Debbie Harry and Nigel Harrison, who had previously written the hits "One Way or Another" and "Union City Blue" together. In the lyrics, Harry sings in first person about being a war child (a child soldier) and reflects on living within the violent conflicts of then-current wars, such as those in the Cambodian–Vietnamese War and in the Middle East. It was first performed live in Blondie's 1982's Tracks Across America Tour. A recording was included in subsequent live albums and VHS/DVDs. In 2014, "War Child" was included in Blondie's live setlists as a medley with Black Sabbath's "War Pigs".

The single was the second and final release from the album, and would therefore be the last new Blondie single for seventeen years, when the band reformed and released "Maria" in 1999.

The B-side to this single was "Little Caesar", also from The Hunter album. The 12" single included an extended remix of "War Child" by producer Mike Chapman, which can be found as a bonus track on EMI's 1994 and 2001 CD re-issues of the album The Hunter.

== Track listing ==
UK 7" (CHS 2624, July 1982) & 7" Picture Disc (CHSP 2624, July 1982)

1. "War Child" (Deborah Harry, Nigel Harrison) - 3:49
2. "Little Caesar" (Deborah Harry, Chris Stein) - 3:00

UK 12" (12 CHS 2624, July 1982)

1. "War Child" (12" Mix) (Harry, Harrison) - 8:04
2. "Little Caesar" (Harry, Stein) - 3:00

== Chart positions ==
Chart (1982)	Peak Position
Australia	96
Irish Singles Chart	21
Luxembourg (Radio Luxembourg)	18
UK Singles Chart	39
