= Parade Stadium =

Former football stadium in Minneapolis, Minnesota

- Interactive map of Parade Stadium
- Coordinates: 44°58′15″N 93°17′31″W
- Owner: Minneapolis Park & Recreation Board
- Capacity: 16,560
- Type: Stadium
- Events: Football, concerts
- Record attendance: 30,000 (Melissa Manchester concert, June 1979)

Construction
- Opened: 1951
- Demolished: 1990
- Cost: $600,000

Parade Stadium is a former football stadium in Minneapolis, Minnesota. It was Minneapolis's first public football stadium. The Minneapolis Park and Recreation Board built the 16,560-seat stadium at The Parade, a park just west of downtown, in 1951. It was meant for high school, amateur, and small-college games. The stadium was also used for summertime Minneapolis Aquatennial festivities for over forty years.

== History ==
Thomas Lowry, who lived on a hill overlooking the grounds, and others donated most of the land for The Parade to the Minneapolis park board in 1904. The board did not act on Lowry's suggestion for a golf course for the park but did express its intent to use the area for active recreation purposes. In the spring of 1908, the park board developed five baseball fields at The Parade, which were the city's first public recreation facilities. They were so popular that a permit system was created. Two more baseball fields were added in the summer. The ball fields had practices every weeknight and games every Saturday. Athletics were not allowed on Sundays. That fall football goal posts were installed.

The first citywide track meet was held in 1910 and the park board built four tennis courts in 1911. Woodrow Wilson gave a campaign speech at The Parade in 1912. After the seven baseball and two football fields were re-graded and open for play in 1914, the park became the center of amateur sports in the city. In the 1920s, some football games at The Parade attracted standing crowds estimated at 5,000 spectators.

The park board proposed building a stadium there in 1933, and applied for federal public-works funding, but were unsuccessful. It tried again, in 1944, when it added a stadium to its list of "post-war progress" projects. The board claimed the city needed a stadium with a seating capacity between the huge Memorial Stadium at the University of Minnesota and various small park and school athletic fields.

In 1950, the city finally approved $600,000 in bonds over two years to build only the stadium. To make room for it, the park board moved The Parade tennis center to Nicollet Park, since renamed Reverend Dr. Martin Luther King Jr. Park.

The stadium hosted its first major event in July 1951, when the Lone Ranger and Silver appeared at an Aquatennial children's event. That September, an exhibition football game between the Green Bay Packers and San Francisco 49ers drew 20,000 fans. At first, the stadium was a financial success, partly because of revenue from hosting an annual National Football League (NFL) exhibition game. But Parade Stadium was never intended to host professional games. When Metropolitan Stadium was built in Bloomington in 1956 to attract professional baseball and football to Minnesota, the yearly NFL exhibition game was played there.

Parade Stadium continued hosting about 50 football games a year. The most popular were Friday-night and Saturday-night Minneapolis high school games; during a golden age of Minneapolis city high school football dominance, Minneapolis Washburn Coach George Wemeier led the Millers to unbeaten seasons each year from 1968 to 1973 and won four Minnesota State High School AA Championships. The 1977 state title game - won by Washburn over Stillwater - cemented the Parade Stadium football field as The Hartbreak House, a moniker inspired by Washburn's three sport All-American, Dave Hart.

It hosted the annual Minnesota high school all-star football game for many years. Augsburg University's football team used Parade Stadium as its home field from 1951 to 1983. It also was the starting point of the two Aquatennial parades each summer. The park board booked other events, from midget-car races to circuses. But area residents objected to the noise and traffic. The costs of maintaining the stadium soon exceeded revenue.

By the mid-1960s, the only moneymaker at The Parade was the parking lot. After the Guthrie Theater opened across the street in May 1963, most of its patrons parked in the stadium lot.

In the mid-1960s, Parade Stadium generated income by booking top musical acts for outdoor rock concerts. Buffalo Springfield, Jefferson Airplane, Fleetwood Mac, and Blondie, among others, played there. Singer Melissa Manchester drew the stadium's largest crowd of 30,000 in June 1979. The last big-name act to play at Parade Stadium was Simon and Garfunkel in July 1983.

Eventually, music promoters became unwilling to meet the growing limitations placed on concerts by the park board to address complaints from people who lived near the stadium. By 1986, only five events were booked there, two of which were Aquatennial parades. The structure was 35 years old, and the park board estimated that it needed $250,000 in renovations.

In 1988, the park board collaborated with the Walker Art Center to create the Minneapolis Sculpture Garden on park land next to the stadium. The Sculpture Garden's popularity led to its expansion in 1990. A heavily used softball field had to be moved to accommodate that expansion. The logical place to put it was where the little-used stadium stood. As a result, Parade Stadium was demolished in 1990, the softball field was moved, and the Sculpture Garden expanded. The Walker paid the million-dollar price tag for demolition of the stadium and relocation of the softball field.

=== NFL preseason games at Parade Stadium ===
- September 12, 1951 San Francisco 49ers 20–0 Green Bay Packers
- September 17, 1952 Pittsburgh Steelers 7–6 Green Bay Packers
- August 22, 1953 Green Bay Packers 31–7 New York Giants
- August 14, 1954 Chicago Cardinals 27–10 Green Bay Packers
- September 6, 1955 New York Giants 17–14 Baltimore Colts
- August 25, 1962 St Louis Cardinals 24–21 Minnesota Vikings

== Current uses ==
Since the football stadium was demolished, the baseball field on the site has been called Parade Stadium. It is the home field for Augsburg University baseball. In 2006, the Minneapolis Park and Recreation Board added a synthetic turf football and soccer field near the site of the old football stadium. The entire athletic complex is called Parade Park and includes the three-sheet Parade Ice Garden.
