= For Your Eyes Only (film) =

1981 James Bond film directed by John Glen

- British theatrical release poster
- Directed by: John Glen
- Screenplay by: Richard Maibaum; Michael G. Wilson
- Based on: "For Your Eyes Only" "Risico" by Ian Fleming
- Produced by: Albert R. Broccoli
- Starring: Roger Moore; Carole Bouquet; Chaim Topol; Lynn-Holly Johnson; Julian Glover
- Cinematography: Alan Hume
- Edited by: John Grover
- Music by: Bill Conti
- Production company: Eon Productions
- Distributed by: United Artists
- Release dates: 24 June 1981 (United Kingdom); 26 June 1981 (United States)
- Running time: 127 minutes
- Countries: United Kingdom; United States
- Language: English
- Budget: $28 million
- Box office: $195.3 million

For Your Eyes Only is a 1981 spy film, the twelfth film in the James Bond franchise produced by Eon Productions, and the fifth to star Roger Moore as the fictional MI6 agent James Bond. The film also co-stars Carole Bouquet, Chaim Topol, Lynn-Holly Johnson and Julian Glover, and marked the feature directorial debut of John Glen, who had served as a film editor and second unit director on previous films in the series.

The film was written by Richard Maibaum and Michael G. Wilson. Although the script is principally based on two Ian Fleming short stories, "For Your Eyes Only" and "Risico", some elements of the plot were also inspired by the novels Live and Let Die, Goldfinger and On Her Majesty's Secret Service. The film follows Bond as he attempts to locate a missile command system while becoming tangled in a web of deception spun by rival Greek smugglers along with Melina Havelock, a woman seeking to avenge the murder of her parents.

After the science-fiction-focused Moonraker, the producers wanted a return to the style of the early Bond films and the works of 007 creator Fleming. For Your Eyes Only followed a grittier, more realistic approach and a narrative theme of revenge and its consequences, rather than the fantasy narrative of Moonraker. Filming took place from September 1980 to February 1981, and locations included Greece, Italy and the United Kingdom, while underwater footage was shot in the Bahamas. Sheena Easton performed the title theme song.

For Your Eyes Only was released in the UK on 24 June 1981 and in the US two days later; it received a mixed critical reception. The film's reputation has improved over time, with reviewers praising the more serious tone in comparison to previous entries in the series, with others saying it was the best of Moore's films after The Spy Who Loved Me. The film was a financial success, generating $195.3 million worldwide.

For Your Eyes Only was the final Bond film to be distributed solely by United Artists; the company was absorbed by Metro-Goldwyn-Mayer soon after this film's release. It was followed by Octopussy in 1983.

== Plot ==
The British information-gathering vessel St Georges, which holds the Automatic Targeting Attack Communicator (ATAC), the system used by the Ministry of Defence to co-ordinate the Royal Navy's fleet of Polaris submarines, is sunk after trawling an old naval mine in the Ionian Sea. The British ask marine archaeologist Sir Timothy Havelock to secretly locate the St Georges, but he and his wife are murdered on their yacht (Triana) by Cuban hitman Hector Gonzales. Their daughter Melina witnesses this, and vows revenge.

The head of the KGB, General Gogol, has also learned of the fate of the St Georges and notified his contact in Greece. MI6 agent James Bond is ordered by the Minister of Defence, Sir Frederick Gray, and MI6 Chief of Staff Bill Tanner to retrieve the ATAC before the Soviets do so, for the transmitter could order attacks by the submarines' Polaris ballistic missiles.

Bond goes to Spain to learn who hired Gonzales. While spying on Gonzales's villa, he is captured by his men but escapes as a crossbow bolt kills Gonzales. The assassin was Melina, who escapes with Bond. Back in London, he and Q use the computerised Identigraph to identify the man he saw paying off Gonzales as Emile Leopold Locque, and Bond goes to Locque's possible base in Cortina, Italy. There, he meets his contact, Luigi Ferrara, and a well-connected Greek business magnate and intelligence informant, Aris Kristatos, who reveals that Locque is employed by Milos Columbo, known as "the Dove" in the Greek underworld, Kristatos's former Greek resistance partner during the Second World War. After Bond goes with Kristatos's protégée, figure skater Bibi Dahl, to a biathlon course, a group of three men, which includes East German biathlete Eric Kriegler, chase and try to kill him via ski. Bond escapes and goes with Ferrara to bid Bibi farewell in an ice rink, where he fends off another attempt on his life by three men in ice hockey gear. Ferrara is killed in Bond's car, with a dove pin in his hand.

Bond then travels to Corfu in pursuit of Columbo. At the casino, he meets Kristatos and asks how to meet Columbo, not knowing that his men are secretly recording their conversation. After Columbo argues with his mistress, Countess Lisl von Schlaf, Bond offers to escort her home with Kristatos's car and driver. The two spend the night together, but the next morning they are ambushed on the beach and Lisl is killed by Locque, who mows her down in a beach buggy before speeding away. Bond is captured by Columbo's men before Locque can kill him. Columbo then tells Bond that Locque was actually hired by Kristatos, who is working for the KGB to retrieve the ATAC. Bond accompanies Columbo and his crew on a raid on one of Kristatos's opium-processing warehouses in Albania, where he uncovers naval mines similar to the one that sank the St Georges. After the base is destroyed, Bond chases Locque and kills him by shoving his car off a cliff while he is trapped inside.

Afterwards, Bond meets Melina, and they recover the ATAC from the wreckage of the St Georges, but Kristatos is waiting for them when they surface and takes it. The two escape an assassination attempt and discover Kristatos's rendezvous point when Melina's parrot, Max, repeats the phrase "ATAC to St Cyril's". Aided by Columbo and his men, they break into St Cyril's, an abandoned mountaintop monastery. Bond scales the peak and dispatches Apostis, a henchman of Kristatos. As Columbo confronts Kristatos, Bond kills Kriegler.

Bond retrieves the ATAC system and stops Melina from killing Kristatos after he surrenders. Kristatos prepares to kill Bond with a hidden flick knife, but is killed by a knife thrown by Columbo. Gogol arrives by helicopter to collect the ATAC, but Bond throws it off the cliff, maintaining the relatively peaceful status quo, and Gogol departs in amused understanding. Bond and Melina later spend a romantic evening aboard her father's yacht while Melina's parrot fields a call from MI6 and British Prime Minister Margaret Thatcher.

== Cast ==
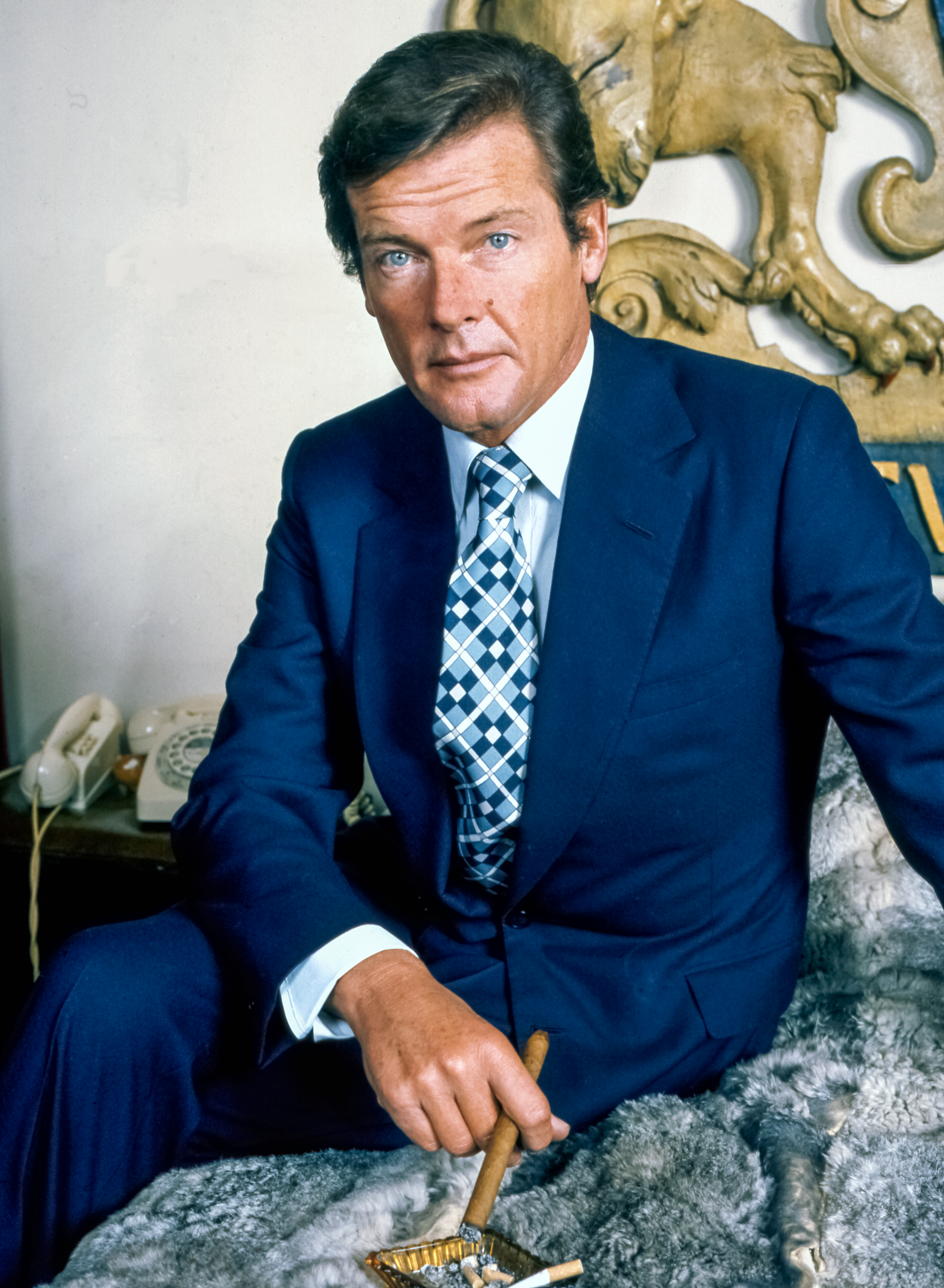
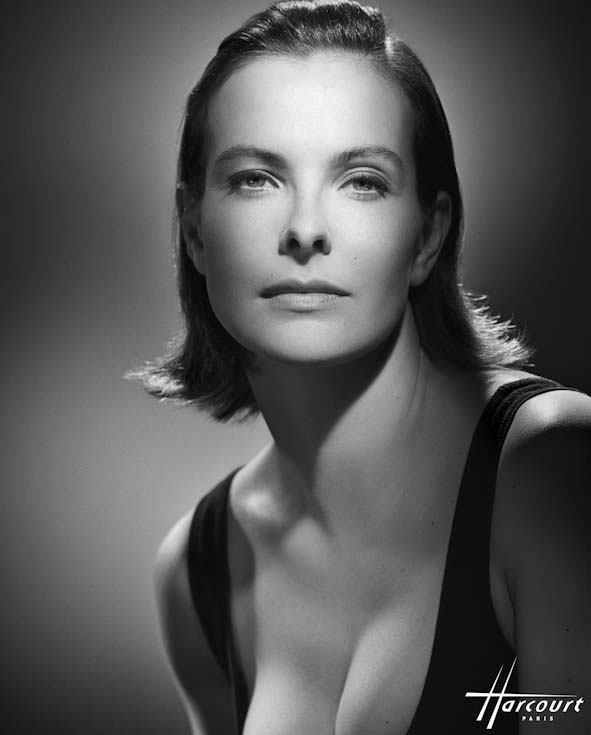
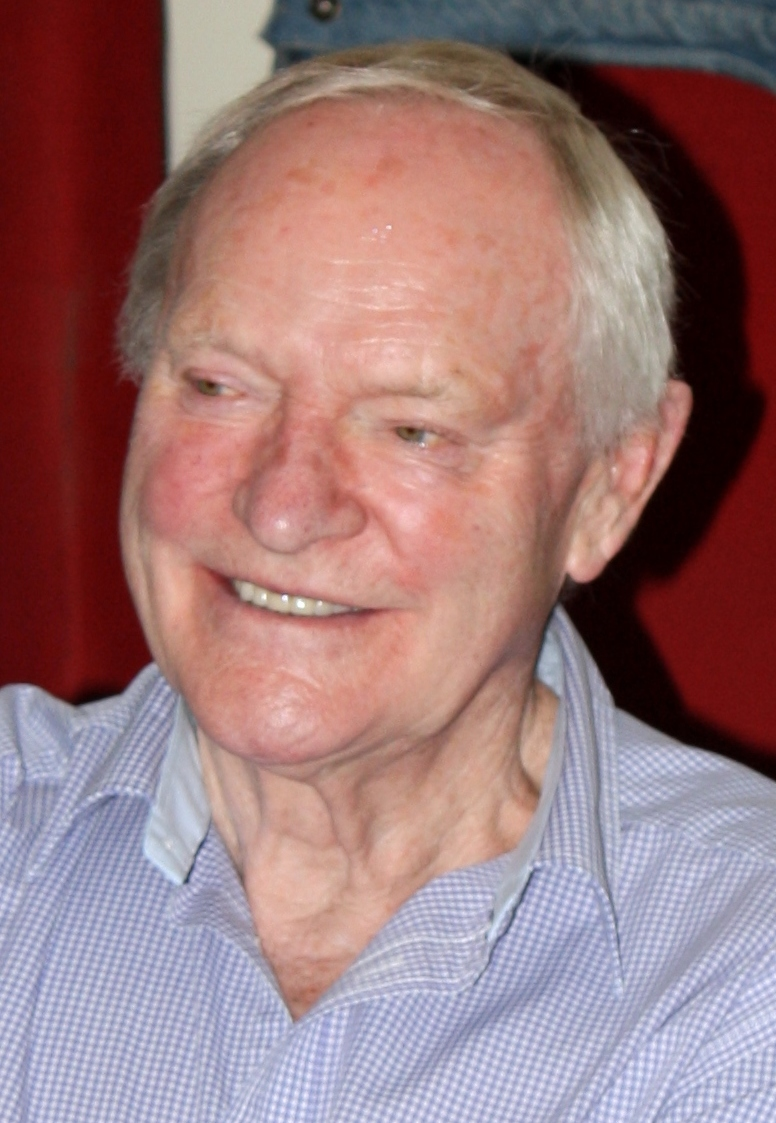
Roger Moore (left) in 1973, Carole Bouquet (middle) in 1995 and Julian Glover in 2011
- Roger Moore as James Bond, MI6 agent 007, who is sent to retrieve a stolen "ATAC" system that could be misused for controlling British submarines.
- Carole Bouquet as Melina Havelock, the daughter of marine archaeologists who are murdered while tracking down the ATAC's whereabouts. Bouquet had auditioned for the role of Holly Goodhead in Moonraker, but was unsuccessful.
- Chaim Topol as Milos Columbo, Kristatos's enemy and former smuggling partner. He convinces Bond to side with him. Named after Gioacchino Colombo, the Ferrari engine designer, specifically Ferrari 125, which Fleming admired. Topol suggested the pistachios as a trademark of the character, which are used in the warehouse assault scene to orient Columbo's men on where to shoot.
- Lynn-Holly Johnson as Bibi Dahl, an ice-skating prodigy who has a crush on Bond; she is training with the financial support of Kristatos. Johnson was an ice skater before turning to acting, and achieved second place at the novice level of the 1974 United States Figure Skating Championships. Michael Wilson explained that she was written as "a character that antagonised Bond."
- Julian Glover as Aristotle Kristatos, a former war hero turned smuggler. Initially shown as an ally, later as the main villain, planning to expand his fortune by selling the ATAC to the KGB. Glover had been shortlisted as a possible Bond for Live and Let Die, eventually losing out to Moore.
- Cassandra Harris as Lisl, The Countess Von Schlaf, Columbo's mistress. At the time of filming Harris was married to future Bond actor Pierce Brosnan, and the couple lunched with the film's producer Albert R. Broccoli during filming.
- Michael Gothard as Emile Leopold Locque, a Belgian hired assassin known by his octagonal-rimmed glasses. He turns out to be an associate of Kristatos.
- Jill Bennett as Jacoba Brink, Bibi's skating coach.
- Jack Hedley as Sir Timothy Havelock, Melina's father and a marine archaeologist hired by the British Secret Service secretly to locate the wreck of St. Georges.
- Walter Gotell as General Anatoly Gogol, head of the KGB.
- James Villiers as Bill Tanner, MI6 Chief of Staff. The role of Tanner first appeared on film in The Man with the Golden Gun, although in an un-credited capacity. Villiers presumed he would play the role of M in subsequent films and was disappointed not to be asked; the producers thought him too young for the role and wanted an actor in his 70s.
- Desmond Llewelyn as Q, the head of MI6's technical department.
- John Moreno as Luigi Ferrara, 007's MI6 contact in northern Italy.
- Geoffrey Keen as Sir Frederick Gray (credited as Minister of Defence), a politician in the British government. The role, along with Bill Tanner as Chief of Staff, was used to brief Bond in place of M, following the death of Bernard Lee.
- Lois Maxwell as Miss Moneypenny, M's secretary.
- John Wyman as Erich Kriegler, an East German Olympic class biathlete. He is revealed to be Kristatos's second in-command and a KGB contact.
- Stefan Kalipha as Hector Gonzales, a Cuban hitman.

John Hollis plays the bald villain in a wheelchair, voiced by Peter Marinker. The character appears in the pre-credits sequence and is both unnamed and uncredited. The character contains a number of characteristics of Ernst Stavro Blofeld, but could not be identified as such because of the legal reasons surrounding the Thunderball controversy with Kevin McClory claiming sole rights to the Blofeld character, a claim disputed by Eon. Bob Simmons, who previously portrayed Bond in the gun barrel sequences in the first three films and SPECTRE agent Colonel Jacques Bouvar in Thunderball, cameos as another villain as Gonzales's henchman who falls victim to Bond's exploding Lotus. Victor Tourjansky, the assistant director, has his third cameo in the Bond films as a drinking tourist; he is credited as part of the Ski Team for Stunts. Charles Dance appears as Claus, Locque's right-hand man in the ski slope sequence, who is later killed by one of Columbo's frogmen while holding Bond at gunpoint after the beach chase where Locque kills Lisl. Janet Brown plays Margaret Thatcher, the Prime Minister of the United Kingdom, who appears in the closing scene alongside John Wells as her husband, Denis Thatcher.

== Production ==
We had gone as far as we could into space. We needed a change of some sort, back to the grass roots of Bond. We wanted to make the new film more of a thriller than a romp, without losing sight of what made Bond famous—its humour.

— John Glen

Ian Fleming wrote the original story "For Your Eyes Only" as an episode of a cancelled James Bond television series at CBS in 1958. Eon Productions originally intended to produce For Your Eyes Only after The Spy Who Loved Me. However, after the success of Star Wars in 1977 the producers decided to produce Moonraker instead. Moonraker was successful yet had been very expensive to produce, and shortly afterwards United Artists suffered a major financial flop with Michael Cimino's Heaven's Gate. This, along with the early 1980s recession, required For Your Eyes Only to have a lower budget. For Your Eyes Only marked a change in the make up of the production crew. The previous series directors Terence Young, Guy Hamilton, Lewis Gilbert and Peter Hunt were unable to direct because the studio could not afford to hire them, and John Glen was promoted from his duties as a film editor to director, a position he would occupy for four subsequent films. Glen brought on much of his second-unit direction team from The Spy Who Loved Me and Moonraker, including cinematographer Alan Hume. The transition in directors and lower budget resulted in a harder-edged directorial style, with less emphasis on gadgetry and large action sequences in huge arenas as was favoured by Gilbert in the previous two films. Emphasis was placed on tension, plot and character in addition to a return to Bond's more serious roots, whilst For Your Eyes Only "showed a clear attempt to activate some lapsed and inactive parts of the Bond mythology."

The film was also a deliberate effort to bring the series more back to reality, following the success of Moonraker in 1979. As co-writer Michael G. Wilson pointed out, "If we went through the path of Moonraker things would just get more outlandish, so we needed to get back to basics". To that end, the story that emerged was simpler, not one in which the world was at risk, but returning the series to that of a Cold War thriller; Bond would also rely more on his wits than gadgets to survive. Glen decided to symbolically represent it with a scene where Bond's Lotus blows itself up and forces 007 to rely on Melina's more humble Citroën 2CV. Since Ken Adam was busy with Pennies from Heaven, Peter Lamont, who had worked in the art department since Goldfinger, was promoted to production designer. Following a suggestion of Glen, Lamont created realistic scenery, instead of the elaborate set pieces for which the series had been known. Elizabeth Waller, an Emmy-winning costume designer with years of BBC experience, was brought on to design Bond's wardrobe.

=== Writing ===
Before the project was postponed in favour of Moonraker, Tom Mankiewicz had written a storyline and Christopher Wood submitted a first draft in January 1978. However, their screenplay did not influence the final film. Richard Maibaum was once again the scriptwriter for the story, assisted by Michael G. Wilson. According to Wilson, the ideas from stories could have come from anyone as the outlines were worked out in committee that could include Broccoli, Maibaum, Wilson and stunt coordinators. Much of the inspiration for the stories for the film came from two Ian Fleming short stories from the collection For Your Eyes Only: Risico and For Your Eyes Only. Another set-piece from the novel of Live and Let Die—the keelhauling—which was unused in the film of the same name, was also inserted into the plot. Other ideas from Fleming were also used in For Your Eyes Only, such as the Identigraph which comes from the novel Goldfinger, where it was originally called the "Identicast". These elements from Fleming's stories were mixed with a Cold War story centred on the MacGuffin of the ATAC. An initial treatment for this film was submitted by Ronald Hardy, an English novelist and screenwriter, in 1979. Hardy's treatment included the involvement of a character named Julia Havelock whose parents were assassinated by a man named Gonzales.

The pre-title sequence of For Your Eyes Only has been described as either "out-of place and disappointing" or "roaringly enjoyable". The scene was shot to introduce a potential new Bond to audiences, thus linking the new actor to elements from previous Bond films (see casting, below).

The sequence begins with Bond laying flowers at the grave of his wife Tracy Bond, before a Universal Exports helicopter picks him up for an emergency. Control of the helicopter is taken over by remote control by a bald man in a grey Nehru jacket with a white cat. This character is unnamed in either the film or the credits, although he looks and sounds like Ernst Stavro Blofeld as played by Donald Pleasence or Telly Savalas. Director John Glen referred to the identity of the villain obliquely: "We just let people use their imaginations and draw their own conclusions ... It's a legal thing". Originally the character was going to be explicitly identified as Blofeld, but was deliberately not named due to copyright restrictions with Kevin McClory, who owned the film rights to Thunderball, which supposedly includes the character Ernst Stavro Blofeld, the organisation SPECTRE, and other material associated with the development of Thunderball. Eon disputed McClory's ownership of the Blofeld character, but decided not to use him again: the scene was "a deliberate statement by Broccoli of his lack of need to use the character."

Maibaum later said "We tried to return to the earlier films with For Your Eyes Only but we didn't have Sean to make it real. And I was very disappointed with the way the love story was handled. The whole idea was that the great lover James Bond can't get to first base with this woman because she was so obsessed with avenging her parents' death. Nothing was ever done with it. It was as if the director didn't feel there was a love story there at all."

=== Casting ===
Roger Moore had originally signed a three-film contract with Eon Productions, which covered his first three appearances (Live and Let Die in 1973, The Man with the Golden Gun in 1974 and The Spy Who Loved Me in 1977). Subsequent to this, the actor negotiated contracts on a film-by-film basis starting with Moonraker in 1979. Uncertainty surrounding his involvement in For Your Eyes Only, considering his age, led to other actors being considered to take over. The candidates included Lewis Collins, known in the UK for his portrayal of Bodie in The Professionals; Ian Ogilvy, known for his role as Simon Templar in Return of the Saint; Michael Billington, who previously appeared in The Spy Who Loved Me as Agent XXX's ill-fated lover Sergei Barzov; (Note: Billington's screen test for For Your Eyes Only was one of the five occasions he auditioned for the role of Bond) and Michael Jayston, who had appeared as Quiller in the television series Quiller. (Note: Jayston eventually played Bond in a BBC Radio production of You Only Live Twice in 1985) (Note: Attributed to multiple references:) Timothy Dalton was strongly considered for the role, but he disliked the direction the series was taking at the time, and he withdrew himself from contention. (Note: Attributed to multiple references:) (Note: Also Dalton did not think the producers were seriously looking for a new 007, and explained his idea of Bond was different. When Moore discovered that Broccoli was screen-testing actors without his knowledge, he announced in the Daily Mail that he would not return to play Bond. However, the producer convinced him to return just two weeks later.)

Bernard Lee died of cancer on 16 January 1981, after filming began on For Your Eyes Only, but before he could film his scenes as M, the head of MI6, as he had done in the previous eleven films of the series. Out of respect, no new actor was hired to assume the role as Broccoli refused to have the character recast and, instead, the script was re-written so that the character is said to be on leave, letting Chief of Staff Bill Tanner take over the role as acting head of MI6 and briefing Bond alongside the Minister of Defence. This is only the second time M has been omitted from a Bond production, the first being the 1954 TV adaptation of Casino Royale. Ironically, the original "For Your Eyes Only" short story dealt with Bond being given a personal mission by M, one of the few times in the Fleming canon that 007 did his superior a direct favour.

Chaim Topol was cast following a suggestion by Broccoli's wife Dana, while Julian Glover joined the cast as the producers felt he was stylish—Glover was even considered to play Bond at some point, but Michael G. Wilson stated that "when we first thought of him he was too young, and by the time of For Your Eyes Only he was too old".

Italian actress Ornella Muti was considered for the movie, but she turned down the lead role (later given to Carole Bouquet) because her costume designer, Wayne Finkelman, was not hired by the production. Carole Bouquet was a suggestion of United Artists publicist Jerry Juroe, and after Glen and Broccoli saw her in That Obscure Object of Desire, they went to Rome to invite Bouquet for the role of Melina.

=== Filming ===
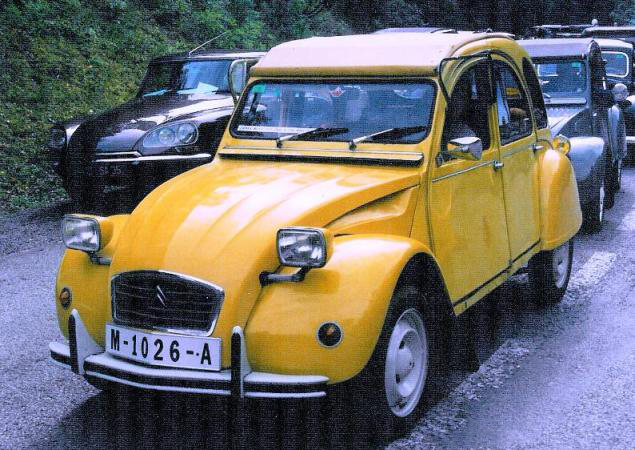
The Citroën 2CV used in the film

Production of For Your Eyes Only began on 2 September 1980 in the North Sea, with three days shooting exterior scenes with the St Georges. Although the previous film had been shot almost entirely outside of the United Kingdom, the new Conservative Prime Minister Margaret Thatcher's tax cuts allowed the shoot to return to Britain. The interiors were shot later in Pinewood Studios, as well as the ship's explosion, which was done with a miniature in Pinewood's tank on the 007 Stage. On 15 September principal photography started on Corfu at the Villa Sylva at Kanoni, above Corfu Town, which acted as the location of the Spanish villa. Many of the local houses were painted white for scenographic reasons. Glen opted to use the local slopes and olive trees for the chase scene between Melina's Citroën 2CV and Gonzales's men driving Peugeot 504s. The scene was shot across twelve days, with stunt driver Rémy Julienne—who would remain in the series up until GoldenEye—driving the Citroën. Four 2CVs were used, with modifications for the stunts—all had more powerful flat-four engines, and one received a special revolving plate on its roof so it could rotate once it got turned upside down.

In October filming moved to other Greek locations, including Meteora and the Achilleion. In November, the main unit moved to England, which included interior work in Pinewood, while the second unit shot underwater scenes in the Bahamas. On 1 January 1981, production moved to Cortina d'Ampezzo in Italy, where filming wrapped in February. Filming locations in Cortina included the historic Grand Hotel Miramonti. Since it was not snowing in Cortina d'Ampezzo by the time of filming, the producers had to pay for trucks to bring snow from nearby mountains, which was then dumped in the city's streets.

Many of the underwater scenes, especially involving close-ups of Bond and Melina, were faked on a dry soundstage. A combination of lighting effects, slow-motion photography, wind and bubbles added in post-production, gave the illusion of the actors being underwater. Actress Carole Bouquet reportedly had a pre-existing health condition that prevented her from performing underwater stunt work. Aquatic scenes were done by a team led by Al Giddings, who had previously worked on The Deep, and filmed in either Pinewood's tank on the 007 Stage or an underwater set built in the Bahamas. Production designer Peter Lamont and his team developed two working props for the submarine Neptune, as well as a mock-up with a fake bottom.

Roger Moore was reluctant to film the scene of Bond kicking a car, with Locque inside, over the edge of a cliff, saying that it "was Bond-like, but not Roger Moore Bond-like." Michael G. Wilson later said that Moore had to be persuaded to be more ruthless than he felt comfortable. Wilson also added that he and Richard Maibaum, along with John Glen, toyed with other ideas surrounding that scene, but ultimately everyone, even Moore, agreed to do the scene as originally written.

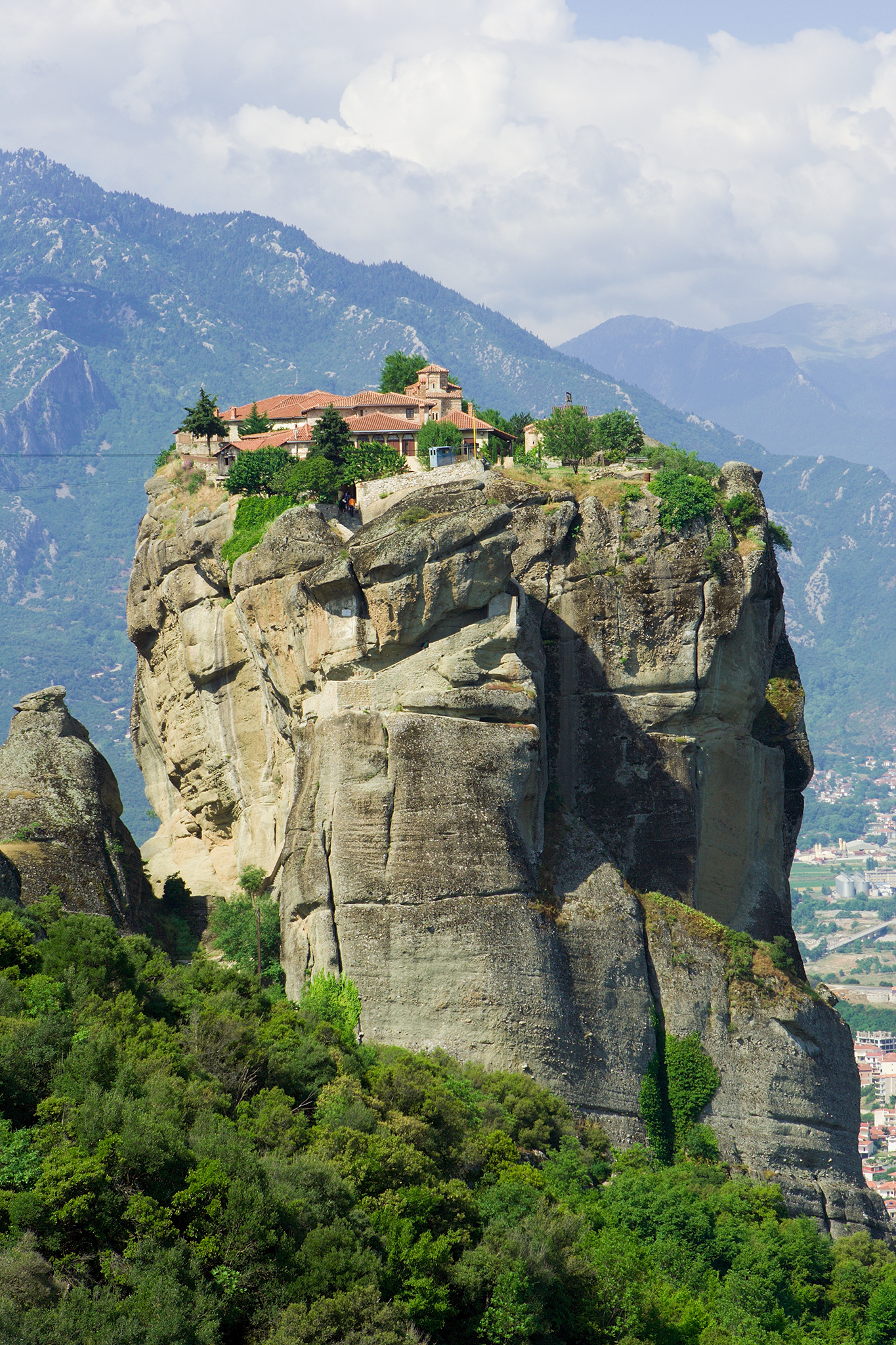
The Monastery of the Holy Trinity in Meteora served as a location

For the Meteora shoots, a Greek bishop was paid to allow filming in the monasteries, but the uninformed Eastern Orthodox monks were mostly critical of production rolling in their installations. After a trial in the Greek Supreme Court, it was decided that the monks' only property were the interiors—the exteriors and surrounding landscapes were from the local government. In protest, the monks remained shut inside the monasteries during the shooting, and tried to sabotage production as much as possible, hanging their washing out of their windows and covering the principal monastery with plastic bunting and flags to spoil the shots, and placing oil drums to prevent the film crew from landing helicopters. The production team solved the problem with back lighting, matte paintings and building both a similar scenographic monastery on a nearby unoccupied rock, and a monastery set in Pinewood.

Roger Moore said he had a great fear of heights, and to do the climbing in Greece, he resorted to moderate drinking to calm his nerves. Later in that same sequence, Rick Sylvester, a stuntman who had previously performed the pre-credits ski jump in The Spy Who Loved Me, undertook the stunt of Bond falling off the side of the cliff. The stunt was dangerous, since the sudden rope jerk at the bottom could be fatal. Special effects supervisor Derek Meddings developed a system that would dampen the stop, but Sylvester recalled that his nerves nearly got the better of him: "From where we were [shooting], you could see the local cemetery; and the box [to stop my fall] looked like a casket. You didn't need to be an English major to connect the dots." The stunt went off without a problem.

Bond cameraman and professional skier Willy Bogner Jr. was promoted to director of a second unit involving ski footage. Bogner designed the ski chase on the bobsleigh track of Cortina d'Ampezzo hoping to surpass his work in both On Her Majesty's Secret Service and The Spy Who Loved Me. To allow better filming, Bogner developed both a system where he was attached to a bobsleigh, allowing to film the vehicle or behind it, and a set of skis that allowed him to ski forwards and backwards to get the best shots. In February 1981, on the final day of filming the bobsleigh chase, one of the stuntmen driving a sleigh, 23-year-old Paolo Rigon, was killed when he became trapped under the bob. The incident, which took place a week after the FIBT World Championships 1981 where USA-1 bobsled driver James Morgan was killed in a crash during the four-man sled competition, resulted in the shortening of the track for future FIBT events.

The pre-credits sequence used the churchyard of the Church of St Giles, Stoke Poges, Buckinghamshire as a cemetery, while the helicopter scenes were filmed at the abandoned Beckton Gas Works in London. The gas works were also the location for some of Stanley Kubrick's film, Full Metal Jacket (1987). Director John Glen gained the idea for the remote-controlled helicopter after seeing a child playing with an RC car. Since flying a helicopter through a warehouse was thought to be too dangerous, the scene was shot using forced perspective. A smaller mock-up was built by Derek Meddings' team closer to the camera that the stunt pilot Marc Wolff flew behind and this made it seem as if the helicopter was entering the warehouse. The footage inside the building was shot on location, though with a life-sized helicopter model which stood over a rail. Stuntman Martin Grace was a stand-in as Bond when the agent is dangling outside the flying helicopter, while Roger Moore himself was used in the scenes inside the model. The helicopter G-BAKS, an Agusta-Bell 206B JetRanger II, crashed in fog on 14 November 1997, killing the pilot at Cocking, West Sussex; it was built on 28 December 1972 for Galliford Construction.

=== Music ===
The score of For Your Eyes Only was written by Bill Conti, who retained some John Barry-influenced brass elements in the score, but also added elements of dance and funk music. While one reviewer observed that "Bill Conti's score is a constant source of annoyance", another claimed that "In the end, For Your Eyes Only stands as one of the best James Bond film scores of the 1980s."

The title song, written by Conti and Michael Leeson, was sung by Sheena Easton, who was the only title song artist to perform it on screen in a Bond film, as designer Maurice Binder liked Easton's appearance and decided to add her to the opening credits. The producers of the film hired Debbie Harry to sing Conti and Leeson's song, but she quit when the producers refused to allow her band Blondie to write and perform an original song for the film. Blondie's rejected song, titled "For Your Eyes Only," can be found on their 1982 album, The Hunter.

== Release and reception ==
For Your Eyes Only was premiered at the Odeon Leicester Square in London on 24 June 1981, setting an all-time opening-day record for any film at any cinema in the UK with a gross of £14,998 (£57,819 in 2025 pounds). The film entered general release in the UK the same day. It went on to gross £10.4 million in the UK.

For Your Eyes Only had its North American premiere in Canada and the US on Friday 26 June, at approximately 1,100 cinemas.

The film grossed $54.8 million in the US and Canada (equivalent to $101.5 million at 2011 ticket prices or $194 million in 2025 dollars, adjusted for general inflation), and $195.3 million worldwide, becoming the second highest grossing Bond film after its predecessor, Moonraker. This was the last James Bond film to be solely released by United Artists, as by this time its owner, Transamerica Corporation, finalised the sale of the company to MGM. Following the MGM and United Artists merger, later runs including future entries were released under "MGM/UA Distribution Co".

The promotional cinema poster for the film featured a woman holding a crossbow; she was photographed from behind, and her outfit left the bottom half of her buttocks exposed. The effect was achieved by having the model wear a pair of bikini bottoms backwards, so that the part seen on her backside is the front of the suit. The poster caused some furor—largely in the US—with The Boston Globe and the Los Angeles Times considering the poster so unsuitable they edited out everything above the knee, whilst The Pittsburgh Press editors painted a pair of shorts over the legs. There was significant speculation as to the identity of the model before photographer Morgan Kane identified her as Joyce Bartle.

A number of items of merchandising were issued to coincide with the film, including a 007 digital watch and a copy of Melina's Citroën 2CV by Corgi Toys. Citroën itself produced a special "007" edition of the 2CV, which even had decorative bullet holes on the door. Marvel Comics also did a comic book adaptation (see section below).

=== Television ===
For Your Eyes Only had its US television premiere during The ABC Sunday Night Movie on November 13, 1983. It delivered a 16.3 household rating, a 26% audience share, and nearly 25 million viewers in Nielsen Media Research results, and finished as the 37th ranked program of the week. It was the first James Bond movie premiere on ABC to finish in third place in its time period instead of in second or first place since the two night premiere of On Her Majesty's Secret Service in February 1976; however, it also ran against stiff competition including the network premiere of Airplane! on NBC (18.9 rating, 29 share) and the first part of the highly rated CBS miniseries Chiefs (25.1 rating, 36 share). A For Your Eyes Only repeat on January 27, 1985, had stronger results, with a 19.4 rating and 28 share.

=== Contemporary reviews ===
Derek Malcolm in The Guardian disliked the film, saying it was "too long ... and pretty boring between the stunts", although he admitted that the stunts were of a high quality. According to Malcolm, Bond "inhabits a fantasy-land of more or less bloodless violence, groinless sex and naivety masked as superior sophistication", with Moore playing him as if in a "nicely lubricated daze". Although Malcolm tipped the film for international box office success, he observed that he "can't quite see why the series has lasted so long and so strong in people's affections." Writing in The Observer, Philip French commented that "not for the first time the pre-credits sequence is the best thing about the film." French was dismissive of Moore's Bond, saying that Bond was "impersonated by Moore" and referred to Moore's advancing years.

David Robinson, writing in The Times bemoaned the fact that the "dramatic bits between the set pieces don't count for much." Like other critics at the time his praise was more directed towards the stunt crews; they were "better than ever in this one." The film critic for the magazine Time Out was brief and pithy: "no plot and poor dialogue, and Moore really is old enough to be the uncle of those girls."

For the US press, Gary Arnold in The Washington Post thought the film was "undeniably easy on the eyes", and further added "maybe too easy to prevent the mind from wandering and the lids from drooping." Arnold was also critical of the large set pieces, calling them "more ponderous than sensational" and that there was "no equivalent of the classic action highlights that can be recalled readily from From Russia with Love or You Only Live Twice or The Spy Who Loved Me or Moonraker. This is a Bond waiting for something inspired to push it over the top." The New York Times critic Vincent Canby said that "For Your Eyes Only is not the best of the series by a long shot" although he did say that the film is "slick entertainment" with a tone that is "consistently comic even when the material is not."

Jack Kroll in Newsweek dismissed the film, saying it was "an anthology of action episodes held together by the thinnest of plot lines", although he did concede that these set pieces are "terrific in their exhilaratingly absurd energy." For Time magazine, Richard Corliss concentrated on the stunts, saying the team "have devised some splendid optional features for For Your Eyes Only" whilst also commenting on Roger Moore, saying that his "mannequin good looks and waxed-fruit insouciance" show him to be "the best-oiled cog in this perpetual motion machine." Jay Scott of The Globe and Mail included it on his list of the year's worst films, calling it "repellant" and "ambitiously bad".

French filmmaker Robert Bresson admired the film: "It filled me with wonder because of its cinematographic writing ... if I could have seen it twice in a row and again the next day, I would have done." Elsewhere Bresson said he also loved the film's ski chase.

=== Retrospective reviews ===
Opinion on For Your Eyes Only has improved over time, with a 69% 'fresh' rating from Rotten Tomatoes, being ranked eleventh among the 24 Bond films. Ian Nathan of Empire gives the film only two of a possible five stars, observing that the film "still ranks as one of the most forgettable Bonds on record." In 2006, IGN chose For Your Eyes Only as the sixth-best Bond film, claiming it is "a good old-fashioned espionage tale", a placement shared by Norman Wilner of MSN, who considered it "the one Moore film that seems to reach back to Connery's heyday", and Entertainment Weekly chose it as the tenth best in 2008, saying it was a "return to low-tech, low-key Bond [with] ... some of the best stunts since the early days". In October 2008 Time Out re-issued a review of For Your Eyes Only and observed that the film is "admirable in intent" but that it "feels a little spare", largely because the plot has been "divested of the bells and whistles that hallmark the franchise".

James Berardinelli wrote that the film was "a solid adventure, although it could have been better", while Danny Peary thought "There are exciting moments, but most of it is standard Bond fare," going on to describe For Your Eyes Only as "an attempt to mix spectacle with [the] tough, believable storylines of early Bond films ... [it] is enjoyable while you're watching it. Afterward, it's one of the most forgettable of the Bond series." Raymond Benson, the author of nine Bond novels, thought For Your Eyes Only was Roger Moore's best Bond film.

Although Chris Nashawaty of Entertainment Weekly ranks Carole Bouquet playing Melina as the "worst babe" of the seven Roger Moore James Bond films, his colleague, Joshua Rich disagreed, putting her tenth in the overall 10 Best Bond Girls listing from the 21 films released up to that point. Entertainment Weekly also ranked Lynn-Holly Johnson as Bibi Dahl as ninth on their list of the 10 worst Bond girls from the 21 films that had been released. After 20 films had been released, IGN ranked Bouquet as fifth in their 'top 10 Bond Babes' list, and The Times thought she was sixth on their list of the Top 10 most fashionable Bond girls after 21 films had been released.

=== Accolades ===
Award	Category	Recipients	Result
Academy Awards	Best Original Song	"For Your Eyes Only"; Music by Bill Conti; Lyrics by Mick Leeson	Nominated
Academy Awards	Irving G. Thalberg Memorial Award	Albert R. Broccoli	Honored
ASCAP Film and Television Music Awards	Most Performed Feature Film Standards	"For Your Eyes Only"; Music by Bill Conti; Lyrics by Mick Leeson	Won
Golden Globe Awards	Best Original Song	"For Your Eyes Only"; Music by Bill Conti; Lyrics by Mick Leeson	Nominated
Golden Screen Awards		"For Your Eyes Only"; Music by Bill Conti; Lyrics by Mick Leeson	Won
Satellite Awards	Best Classic DVD Release	The James Bond DVD Collection (Volumes: 2 and 3)	Nominated
Stinkers Bad Movie Awards	Worst Supporting Actress	Lynn-Holly Johnson	Nominated
Writers Guild of America Awards	Best Comedy – Adapted from Another Medium	Richard Maibaum and Michael G. Wilson	Nominated

In 2004 the American Film Institute nominated the song "For Your Eyes Only" from the film for AFI's 100 Years...100 Songs.

== Adaptations ==
Two-part For Your Eyes Only comic book adaptation by Marvel Comics

As part of the merchandising of For Your Eyes Only, Marvel Comics published an adaptation of the movie as issue 19 of Marvel Comics Super Special; this was also repackaged as a two-issue comic book adaptation of the film. The first issue was released in October 1981 and was soon followed by the second issue in November of the same year. The adaptation was written by Larry Hama, pencilled by Howard Chaykin, inked by Vincent Colletta, and edited by Dennis O'Neil.

It was the second film in the series to have a comic book tie-in, following a Dr. No comic in 1962. Marvel Comics would go on to publish an Octopussy comic book adaptation in 1983.

== See also ==
- Outline of James Bond

== Sources ==
- Barnes, Alan; Hearn, Marcus (2001). Kiss Kiss Bang! Bang!: the Unofficial James Bond Film Companion. Batsford Books. ISBN 978-0-7134-8182-2.
- Benson, Raymond (1988). The James Bond Bedside Companion. London: Boxtree Ltd. ISBN 1-85283-234-7.
- Black, Jeremy (2004). Britain Since the Seventies: Politics and Society in the Consumer Age. Guilford: Biddles Ltd. ISBN 978-1-86189-201-0. Archived from the original on 20 April 2021.
- Black, Jeremy (2005). The Politics of James Bond: from Fleming's Novel to the Big Screen. University of Nebraska Press. ISBN 978-0-8032-6240-9.
- Broccoli, Albert R.; Zec, Donald (1998). When the Snow Melts:The Autobiography of Cubby Broccoli. London, UK: Boxtree. ISBN 978-0-7522-1162-6.
- Chancellor, Henry (2005). James Bond: The Man and His World. London: John Murray. ISBN 978-0-7195-6815-2.
- Chaykin, Howard (2011). Howard Chaykin: Conversations. UPM. ISBN 978-1-60473-975-6.
- Ciment, Michel (2009). Film World: The Director's Interviews. translated by Julie Rose. Oxford: Berg Publishers. ISBN 978-1-84520-457-0.
- Cork, John; Stutz, Collin (2007). James Bond Encyclopedia. London: Dorling Kindersley. ISBN 978-1-4053-3427-3.
- Falsetto, Mario (2001). Stanley Kubrick: A Narrative and Stylistic Analysis. Praeger. ISBN 978-0-275-97291-2.
- Fu, Poshek; Desser, David (2000). The Cinema of Hong Kong. Cambridge University Press. ISBN 978-0-521-77235-8.
- Lindner, Christoph (2003). The James Bond Phenomenon: a Critical Reader. Manchester University Press. ISBN 978-0-7190-6541-5.
- Peary, Danny (1986). Guide for the Film Fanatic. Simon & Schuster. ISBN 978-0-671-61081-4.
- Pfeiffer, Lee; Worrall, Dave (1998). The Essential Bond. London: Boxtree Ltd. ISBN 978-0-7522-2477-0.
- Smith, Jim (2002). Bond Films. London: Virgin Books. ISBN 978-0-7535-0709-4.
- Thompson, Maggie; Frankenhoff, Brent; Bickford, Peter (2010). Comic Book Price Guide 2010. Krause Publications. ISBN 978-1-4402-1399-1.
