= The Hunter (Blondie album) =

1982 studio album by Blondie

Studio album by Blondie
- Released: May 24, 1982
- Recorded: December 1981–February 1982
- Studio: The Hit Factory (New York City)
- Genres: Art rock; funk rock
- Length: 44:56
- Label: Chrysalis
- Producer: Mike Chapman

Blondie chronology
The Best of Blondie (1981)	The Hunter (1982)	Once More into the Bleach (1988)

Singles from The Hunter
- 1. "Island of Lost Souls" Released: April 1982; 2. "War Child" Released: July 1982

The Hunter is the sixth studio album by American rock band Blondie, released on May 24, 1982, by Chrysalis Records. It was Blondie's last album of new material until 1999's No Exit. It was recorded between December 1981 and February 1982.

== Background ==
The Hunter, as stated in the press release, is loosely a concept album based on the theme of "searching, hunting, or pursuing one's own Mt. Everest." Tracks on the album include Jimmy Destri's Motown pastiche "Danceway", while "Dragonfly" has a science-fiction theme to its lyrics about a race in space. "The Beast" deals with lead singer Debbie Harry's experiences of becoming a public figure: "I am the centre of attraction, by staying off the streets". "English Boys" is Harry and Chris Stein's melancholy tribute to "those English boys who had long hair", the Beatles, recorded the year after John Lennon's assassination in New York City, describing the innocence and idealism of the 1960s. "War Child" references military conflicts in Cambodia and the Middle East. The album concludes with a cover version of Smokey Robinson's "The Hunter Gets Captured by the Game", originally recorded by the Marvelettes in 1967.

Frank Infante was initially not included as a member of Blondie when recording the new album, due to friction with other group members, However, Infante (who allegedly was also given minimal opportunity to participate in the recording of their previous album, Autoamerican) began legal proceedings and was later reinstated as a band member after an out-of-court settlement. Infante's name appears in the credits of The Hunter, and he is pictured as a member of the group, but Harry has averred in interviews that Infante's contributions to the finished record are minimal to non-existent.

For the brief North American tour (July to August 1982) to promote the Hunter album, Infante was replaced with session musician Eddie Martinez.

The song "For Your Eyes Only" was originally written for the 1981 James Bond film of the same name. The producers of the film, however, favored a track composed by Bill Conti and Michael Leeson and asked Blondie to record that song instead. When Blondie declined, the Conti/Leeson song was passed on to Sheena Easton. Blondie opted to release their song (written by Harry and Stein) on The Hunter.

Two singles were released from the album, "Island of Lost Souls" and "War Child" (the latter of which was also released as a 12″ extended version). "Danceaway" was planned for release as a single in Canada (backed with "For Your Eyes Only"), but was issued only extremely briefly before the single was withdrawn. Videos for "Island of Lost Souls" and "English Boys" were produced.

In the liner notes to the 2001 reissue of The Hunter, producer Mike Chapman stated, "I knew that we were in a different and far less accessible artistic space. And that worried me. I could tell that things were different now, and I knew that this would be the last Blondie album."

== Release and reception ==
Professional ratings
Review scores
Source	Rating
AllMusic	1.5/5 stars
Christgau's Record Guide	C
Encyclopedia of Popular Music	2/5 stars
The Great Rock Discography	4/10
Rolling Stone	3/5 stars
The Rolling Stone Album Guide	2/5 stars
Spin Alternative Record Guide	1/10

The album peaked at No. 9 in the UK, No. 15 in Australia and No. 33 in the US. Compared to Blondie's three previous albums with Mike Chapman as producer (Parallel Lines, Eat to the Beat and Autoamerican), The Hunter proved to be a disappointment, both commercially and critically, with mixed reviews. Six months after its release, the band splintered. The summer Tracks Across America Tour '82 was set to promote the album but turned out to be unsuccessful. The band's European tour which was due to follow in autumn was cancelled.

The Hunter received a poor reception from music critics. In The Boston Phoenix, Deborah Frost said "Blondie’s sixth album makes the most of the band’s pretensions and the least of its pop instincts ... Where’s the hint of intelligence, the thimbleful of inspiration, the shred of evidence that might suggest these songs weren't picked up at a fire sale? ... once again, Blondie is a joke."

Retrospectively, William Ruhlmann of AllMusic complains that the album sounds like the contractual obligation it is, largely awash with "funk-rock tracks with the barest of melodies", and incoherent or impenetrable lyrics. He said "The Hunter found them running short conceptually as well practically. It was a disappointing end." Critics from Trouser Press write that the group's "excitement about musical recombination had simply degenerated into a polished but sterile capability of manipulating a wide variety of stylistic devices." They dismiss the album for being aimless and lumbering, with a "largely impenetrable pretentiousness" reminiscent of the bands Yes and Jefferson Starship.

In Christgau's Record Guide (1990), Robert Christgau called it "a lousy record by any standard--the pop, the eclectic, even the arty." Rob Sheffield of the Spin Alternative Record Guide (1995) dismissed both The Hunter and its predecessor, Autoamerican, for being "bogged down in increasingly fussy and belabored art-rock." Marc Coleman and Ario Berger of The Rolling Stone Album Guide (2004) criticised The Hunter for its "distracted" content, while in The Encyclopedia of Popular Music (2011), Colin Larkin describes the album as "a generally disappointing set which Harry completed under duress".

The Hunter was digitally remastered and reissued by Chrysalis Records UK in 1994, and again by EMI-Capitol in 2001, both times with the 12″ version of "War Child" as the only bonus track.

== Track listing ==
All lyrics are written by Deborah Harry, except where noted.

Side one
No.	Title	Music	Length
1.	"Orchid Club"	Nigel Harrison	5:44
2.	"Island of Lost Souls"	Chris Stein	4:44
3.	"Dragonfly"	Stein	5:58
4.	"For Your Eyes Only"	Stein	3:05
5.	"The Beast"	Stein	4:50

Side two
No.	Title	Lyrics	Music	Length
6.	"War Child"		Harrison	4:00
7.	"Little Caesar"		Stein	2:57
8.	"Danceway"	Jimmy Destri	Destri	3:16
9.	"(Can I) Find the Right Words (To Say)"		Destri	3:04
10.	"English Boys"		Stein	3:46
11.	"The Hunter Gets Captured by the Game"	Smokey Robinson	Robinson	3:32

Bonus track on 1994 and 2001 CD reissues
No.	Title	Music	Length
12.	"War Child" (extended version)	Harrison	7:58

== Personnel ==
Credits adapted from the liner notes of The Hunter.

=== Blondie ===
- Clem Burke – drums
- Jimmy Destri – keyboards
- Nigel Harrison – bass
- Debbie Harry – vocals
- Frank Infante – guitar
- Chris Stein – guitar

=== Additional personnel ===
- Robert Aaron – horn arrangements, saxophone
- Sammy Figueroa – percussion
- Manuel Badrena – percussion
- Roger Squitero – percussion
- Janice G. Pendarvis – back-up vocals on "The Hunter Gets Captured by the Game"
- Zachary Sanders – back-up vocals on "The Hunter Gets Captured by the Game"
- Lani Groves – back-up vocals on "The Hunter Gets Captured by the Game"
- Darryl Tookes – back-up vocals on "The Hunter Gets Captured by the Game"
- Ray Maldonado – horns on "Little Caesar", "Island of Lost Souls" and "War Child"
- Luis Ortiz – horns on "Little Caesar", "Island of Lost Souls" and "War Child"
- Richard A. Davies – horns on "Little Caesar", "Island of Lost Souls" and "War Child"
- Mac Gollehon – horns on "Little Caesar", "Island of Lost Souls" and "War Child"

=== Technical ===
- Mike Chapman – production
- Doug Schwartz – engineering
- Merwin Belin – group production liaison
- Markie Iannello – technician
- Kevin Flaherty – production (2001 reissue)

=== Artwork ===
- Brian Aris – photography
- Richard Raynis – cover illustration
- Bruce Carleton – lettering, back cover illustration
- John Holmstrom – lettering
- Janet Levinson – design

== Charts ==
=== Weekly charts ===
Weekly chart performance for The Hunter
Chart (1982)	Peak position
Australian Albums (Kent Music Report)	15
Canada Top Albums/CDs (RPM)	24
Dutch Albums (Album Top 100)	19
Finnish Albums (Suomen virallinen lista)	29
German Albums (Offizielle Top 100)	49
New Zealand Albums (RMNZ)	27
Norwegian Albums (VG-lista)	19
Swedish Albums (Sverigetopplistan)	18
UK Albums (Official Charts)	9
US Billboard 200	33

=== Year-end charts ===
Year-end chart performance for The Hunter
Chart (1982)	Position
Australian Albums (Kent Music Report)	99

== Certifications ==
Certifications for The Hunter
Region	Certification	Certified units/sales
Australia (ARIA)	Gold	20,000^{^}
^{^} Shipments figures based on certification alone.
