= Island of Lost Souls (song) =

Single by Blondie

from the album The Hunter
- B-side: "Dragonfly"
- Released: April 1982
- Recorded: 1981
- Genre: Calypso, pop, new wave
- Length: 3:48 (US), 4:44 (UK)
- Label: Chrysalis Records
- Songwriters: Deborah Harry and Chris Stein
- Producer: Mike Chapman

Blondie singles chronology
"Rapture" (1981)	"Island of Lost Souls" (1982)	"War Child" (1982)

Music video
- "Island of Lost Souls" on YouTube

"Island of Lost Souls" is a song recorded by the band Blondie and released as the lead single from their sixth studio album, The Hunter, in April 1982.

== Song information and chart success ==
Continuing the band's penchant for spanning different genres of music, including rock, disco, reggae and rap/hip-hop (all of which had given the band No. 1 hits), "Island of Lost Souls" saw Blondie delve into calypso music, supported by five session musicians: three trumpet players and two saxophonists. Additionally, drummer Clem Burke plays a steelpan and guitarist Chris Stein briefly plays a cuíca in the bridge (a traditional Brazilian friction drum), but this is not shown in the music video and they are not credited with those instruments either.

The song was recorded in the autumn of 1981, and promotional copies of the single were sent to U.S. radio stations on 31 October 1981. Upon its release in 1982, "Island of Lost Souls" was not one of Blondie's biggest hits, only reaching the Top 10 in Belgium, although it did top the Canadian RPM Adult Contemporary chart. It peaked at No. 37 on the Billboard Hot 100 (becoming Blondie's final U.S. Top 40 hit on that chart to date), and also reached No. 11 in the United Kingdom.

== Music video ==
The music video was filmed in the Isles of Scilly in the UK. It features three scenes interspersed with each other: a group of men dressed as undertakers in a Cornish gig boat, the band dressed in white monk robes (the members apart from Harry play horns and saxophones while wearing fish masks), and the band dressed as a Latin American band.

== Track listing ==
US 7" (CHS 2603, April 1982)
UK 7" (CHS 2608 & 7" Picture Disc CHSP 2608, April 1982)

1. "Island of Lost Souls" (7" edit) (Deborah Harry, Chris Stein) – 3:49
2. "Dragonfly" (Harry, Stein) – 5:47

UK 12" (12 CHS 2608, April 1982)

1. "Island of Lost Souls" (Album version) (Harry, Stein) – 4:44
2. "Dragonfly" (Harry, Stein) – 5:47

== Chart performance ==
Chart (1982)	Peak position
Australian Singles Chart	13
Belgium (Ultratop 50 Flanders)	8
Canadian RPM Adult Contemporary	1
Germany (GfK)	66
Irish Singles Chart	15
Luxembourg (Radio Luxembourg)	7
Netherlands (Dutch Top 40)	20
New Zealand (Recorded Music NZ)	18
UK Singles Chart	11
U.S. Billboard Hot 100	37
