= Bill Conti =

American composer and conductor

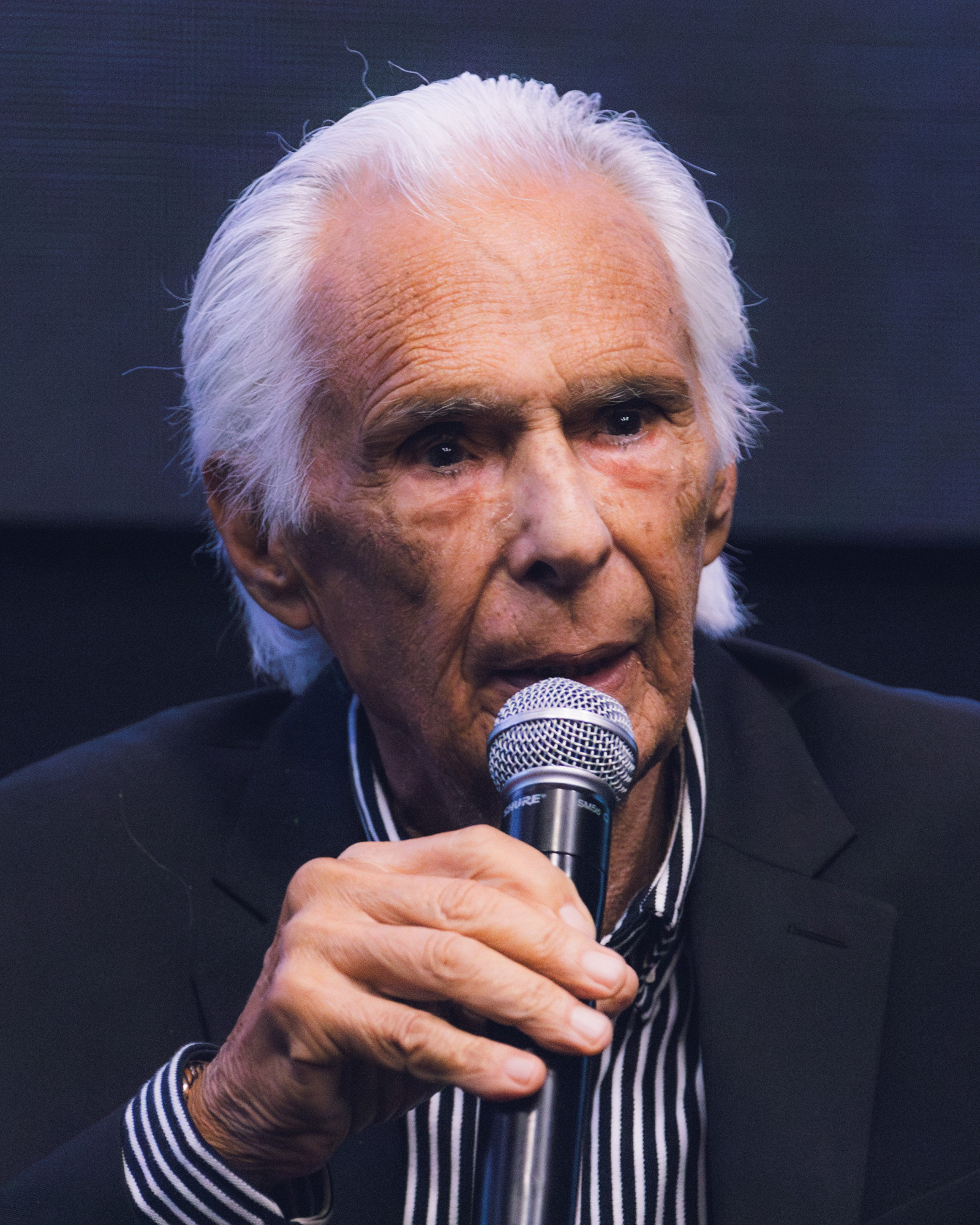
- Conti in 2026

Background information
- Born: William Conti; April 13, 1942 (age 84); Providence, Rhode Island, U.S.
- Genres: Film score, disco
- Occupations: Composer, conductor
- Years active: 1969–present

William Conti (born April 13, 1942) is an American composer and conductor. He is best known for his film scores, including Rocky (1976), Rocky II (1979), Rocky III (1982), Rocky V (1990), Rocky Balboa (2006), The Karate Kid (1984), The Karate Kid Part II (1986), The Karate Kid Part III (1989), The Next Karate Kid (1994), For Your Eyes Only (1981), Dynasty (and its sequel The Colbys) and The Right Stuff (1983), which earned him an Academy Award for Best Original Score. He also received nominations in the Best Original Song category for "Gonna Fly Now" from Rocky and for the title song of For Your Eyes Only. He was the musical director at the Academy Awards a record nineteen times.

Conti is known for his collaborations with director John G. Avildsen, having scored fourteen films for Avildsen, beginning with Rocky (1976) and ending with Inferno (1999). Their collaboration included such pictures as the first three films in The Karate Kid franchise (1984–1989), Slow Dancing in the Big City (1978), The Formula (1980), and Neighbors (1981).

== Biography ==
=== Early life ===
Conti, an Italian American, was born in Providence, Rhode Island, the son of Lucetta and William Conti. He graduated from North Miami High School in 1959. He is a past winner of the Silver Knight Award presented by the Miami Herald. He is a graduate of Louisiana State University School of Music, where he met his wife Shelby Cox, and earned a master's degree with honors from the Juilliard School of Music.

=== Rocky series ===
As early as 1971, Conti was orchestrating pop recordings by Italian artists, such as the album Sì... incoerenza ("Yes to Incoherence") by Italian singer Patty Pravo. He was also a ghostwriter of the scores for spaghetti Westerns. Conti's big break into celebrity came in 1976, when United Artists hired him to compose the music for a small film called Rocky. The film became a phenomenon and won three Oscars at the 49th Academy Awards, including Best Picture. The same ceremony was also the first time Conti served as musical director for the telecast, a role he reprised 19 times, more than any other person. His training montage tune, "Gonna Fly Now", topped the Billboard singles chart in 1977, and earned him an Academy Award nomination for Best Original Song.

Conti also composed music for the sequels Rocky II (1979), Rocky III (1982), Rocky V (1990) and Rocky Balboa (2006).

=== Other film and television credits ===
Conti also worked for some other films and, eventually, for television series. In 1981, he wrote the music for the James Bond film For Your Eyes Only, when John Barry was unwilling for tax reasons to return to the United Kingdom, and provided the score for playwright Jason Miller's film version of his Pulitzer Prize-winning play That Championship Season the following year.

In 1983, Conti composed the score for HBO's first film, The Terry Fox Story. He then did Bad Boys, Living Proof: The Hank Williams Jr. Story, Mass Appeal. In 1984, he won an Academy Award for composing the score to 1983's The Right Stuff, after which he wrote the music for the TV series North and South in 1985. He also scored the Masters of the Universe live action film. Another score was the 1987 film Happy New Year.

In 1991, Conti composed for Necessary Roughness, a college football film. In 1993, he wrote the music for The Adventures of Huck Finn starring Elijah Wood and directed by Stephen Sommers. In 1999, he composed the score for The Thomas Crown Affair remake, starring Pierce Brosnan and Rene Russo. That year, he scored Inferno, starring Jean-Claude Van Damme.

Conti composed the themes to television's Dynasty, The Colbys, Falcon Crest and Cagney & Lacey. He wrote the theme song to the original version of American Gladiators, worked with CBS on its 1980s film jingle, composed one of the early themes of Inside Edition, and wrote the Primetime Live theme for ABC News. He composed the score to the studio-altered American version of Luc Besson's The Big Blue.

Two of Conti's previously composed works were reused for the show Lifestyles of the Rich and Famous. These were the love theme "Come with Me Now", from the soundtrack for Five Days from Home (used for the show's main theme), and "Runaway", from For Your Eyes Only (used for in-show content).

== Awards and nominations ==
Conti has been nominated for three Academy Awards, winning one in the Best Original Score category for The Right Stuff. He also received nominations in the Best Original Song category for "Gonna Fly Now" from Rocky and for the title song of For Your Eyes Only.

He had three Golden Globe nominations; two for Best Original Score for Rocky and An Unmarried Woman, and one for Best Original Song for the title song of For Your Eyes Only.

Conti also received thirteen Emmy nominations, all but one for his role as musical director at the Academy Awards (the exception, his first nomination, was for his music for the 1985 series North and South). He won three Emmy Awards for Outstanding Musical Direction for the 64th, 70th and 75th Academy Award ceremonies.

On April 22, 2008, at the LSU Union Theatre at Louisiana State University, Conti was inducted into the Louisiana Music Hall of Fame.

== Selected discography ==
- Blume in Love (1973)
- Harry and Tonto (1974)
- Next Stop, Greenwich Village (1976)
- Rocky (1976)
- Smash-Up on Interstate 5 (1976)
- F.I.S.T (1978)
- Paradise Alley (1978)
- The Big Fix (1978)
- Slow Dancing in the Big City (1978)
- An Unmarried Woman (1978)
- Five Days from Home (1978)
- The Pirate (1978)
- Dreamer (1979)
- Rocky II (1979)
- Goldengirl (1979)
- The Seduction of Joe Tynan (1979)
- A Man, a Woman and a Bank (1979)
- Gloria (1980)
- Private Benjamin (1980)
- The Formula (1980)
- Escape to Victory (1981)
- Carbon Copy (1981)
- For Your Eyes Only (1981)
- Neighbors (1981)
- Rocky III (1982)
- I, the Jury (1982)
- Split Image (1982)
- Theme from Dynasty (1982): The single spent nine weeks on the Billboard Hot 100, peaking at number 52 in December 1982.
- That Championship Season (1982)
- Cagney & Lacey (1982)
- Emerald Point N.A.S. (1983)
- Living Proof: The Hank Williams Jr. Story (1983)
- Bad Boys (1983)
- The Right Stuff (1983)
- The Terry Fox Story (1983)
- Grand Canyon: The Hidden Secrets (1984)
- The Karate Kid (1984)
- The Karate Kid I, II, III, The Next Karate Kid Original Motion Picture Soundtrack Scores (released 2006)
- Unfaithfully Yours (1984)
- Theme from Dynasty II: The Colbys (1985)
- North and South (1985)
- Gotcha! (1985)
- F/X (1986)
- The Karate Kid, Part II (1986) (released 2011)
- Nomads (1986)
- Masters of the Universe (1987)
- Theme from Napoleon and Josephine: A Love Story (1987)
- A Prayer for the Dying (1987)
- Broadcast News (1987)
- A Night in the Life of Jimmy Reardon (1988)
- Cohen & Tate (1988)
- Bionic Showdown: The Six Million Dollar Man and the Bionic Woman (1989)
- Lock Up (1989)
- American Gladiators (1990)
- The Fourth War (1990)
- Rocky V (1990)
- Necessary Roughness (1991)
- Year of the Gun (1991)
- Falcon Crest (TeeVee Tunes Soundtrack) (1992)
- Dynasty (TeeVee Tunes Soundtrack) (1992)
- Blood In Blood Out (1993)
- The Adventures of Huck Finn (1993)
- Rookie of the Year (1993) (released 2006)
- 8 Seconds (1994)
- Bushwhacked (1995) (released 2006)
- Napoleon (1995)
- Spy Hard (1996)
- The Real Macaw (1998)
- Wrongfully Accused (1998)
- Inferno (1999)
- The Thomas Crown Affair (1999) (includes other artists)
- Avenging Angelo (2002)
- Boys on the Run (2003)
- Rocky Balboa (2006)
- Rocky Balboa: The Best of Rocky (2006) (includes other artists)
