= Chris Cornell discography =

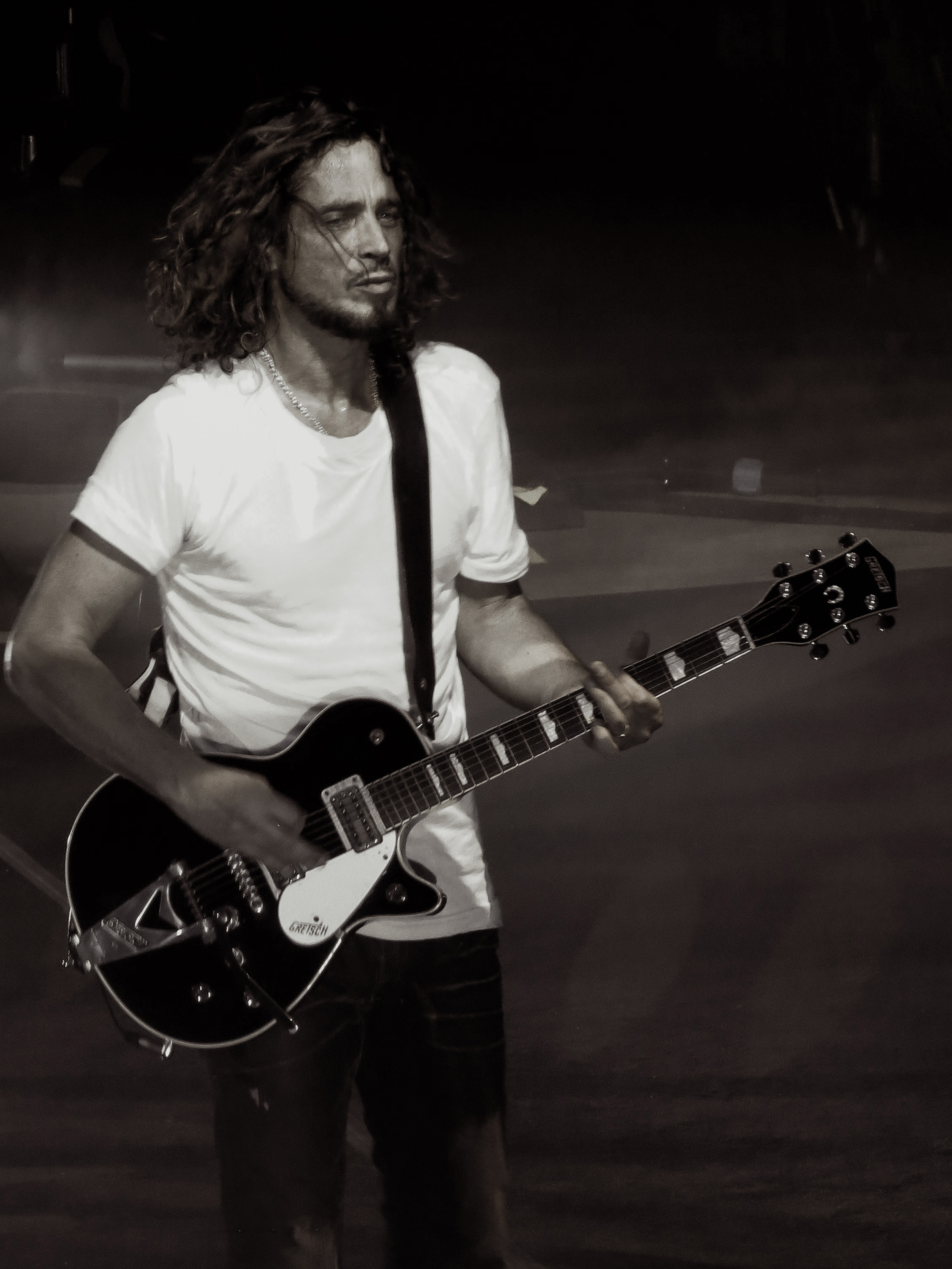
- Cornell performing in 2013
- Studio albums: 5
- Extended plays: 4
- Live albums: 1
- Compilation albums: 2
- Singles: 19
- Music videos: 14

This is the discography of Chris Cornell, an American rock musician. This list does not include material recorded by Cornell with Soundgarden, Temple of the Dog, or Audioslave, of which he was the main vocalist, frontman, and rhythm guitarist. His four solo studio albums released during his lifetime were Euphoria Morning (1999), Carry On (2007), Scream (2009), and Higher Truth (2015). A fifth, No One Sings Like You Anymore, Vol. 1, was released posthumously in 2020. His two compilation albums (including one posthumous) were The Roads We Choose – A Retrospective (2007) and Chris Cornell (2018). He released one live album, titled Songbook. Cornell made numerous soundtrack contributions and released nineteen singles. With Soundgarden, he produced six albums, five EPs, and two greatest hits compilations. He released three albums with Audioslave and one with Temple of the Dog. Cornell also co-produced the Screaming Trees album Uncle Anesthesia.

== Albums ==
=== Studio albums ===
List of studio albums, with selected chart positions
Title	Album details	Peak chart positions									
Title	Album details	US	AUS	CAN	FIN	GER	IRE	NLD	NZ	SWI	UK
Euphoria Morning	Release: September 21, 1999; Label: A&M; Formats: CD, LP	18	21	12	26	33	—	89	15	49	31
Carry On	Release: May 28, 2007; Label: Interscope/Suretone; Format: CD, LP	17	27	—	6	62	29	33	34	35	25
Scream	Release: March 10, 2009; Label: Interscope/Suretone; Format: CD, Download	10	69	13	18	46	10	61	—	28	70
Higher Truth	Release: September 18, 2015; Label: Universal Music Enterprises; Format: CD, LP	19	21	16	—	77	43	27	13	26	37
No One Sings Like You Anymore, Vol. 1	Release: December 11, 2020; Label: Universal Music Enterprises; Format: Digital download, streaming	78	—	—	—	26	—	—	39	18	—
"—" denotes a recording that did not chart or was not released in that territory.

=== Live albums ===
List of live albums, with chart positions
Title	Album details	Peak chart positions		
Title	Album details	US	AUS	NZ
Songbook	Release: November 21, 2011; Label: Universal; Format: CD, LP	69	21	20

=== Compilations ===
List of compilation albums
Title	Album details	Peak chart positions			
Title	Album details	US	AUS	AUT	SWI
The Roads We Choose – A Retrospective	Release: March 2007; Label: Interscope; Format: CD	—	—	—	—
Chris Cornell	Release: November 16, 2018; Label: UME; Formats: CD, LP, digital download	67	53	51	39

== EPs ==
List of extended plays, with selected chart positions
Title	EP details	Peak chart positions
Title	EP details	US
Poncier	Release: 1992; Label: Real Clever; Format: CD	—
Part of Me Remix EP	Release: May 26, 2009; Label: Mosley/Interscope; Format: Digital download	—
Songbook EP 1 (Live)	Release: November 2, 2011; Label: Universal Music; Format: Digital download	143
Songbook EP 2 (Live)	Release: November 15, 2011; Label: Universal Music; Format: Digital download	—

== Singles ==
List of singles, with selected chart positions
Title	Year	Peak chart positions										Certification	Album
Title	Year	US	AUT	CAN	DEN	FIN	FRA	GER	IRE	SWI	UK	Certification	Album
"Flutter Girl"	1999	—	—	—	—	—	—	—	—	—	—		Euphoria Morning
"Can't Change Me"	1999	— (Note: "Can't Change Me" did not enter the Billboard Hot 100 but peaked at number two on the Bubbling Under Hot 100 Singles chart.)	—	77	—	—	—	—	—	—	62		Euphoria Morning
"Preaching the End of the World"	2000	—	—	—	—	—	—	—	—	—	—		Euphoria Morning
"You Know My Name"	2006	79	18	—	2	3	51	15	11	10	7	BPI: Gold	Carry On
"No Such Thing" (US-only release)	2007	—	—	—	—	—	—	—	—	—	—		Carry On
"Arms Around Your Love" (UK-only release)	2007	—	—	—	—	—	—	—	—	—	177		Carry On
"She'll Never Be Your Man"	2007	—	—	—	—	—	—	—	—	—	—		Carry On
"Long Gone"	2008	—	—	—	—	—	—	—	—	—	—		Scream
"Watch Out"	2008	—	—	—	—	—	—	—	—	—	—		Scream
"Ground Zero"	2008	—	—	—	—	—	—	—	—	—	—		Scream
"Scream"	2008	— (Note: "Scream" did not enter the Billboard Hot 100 but peaked at number ten on the Bubbling Under Hot 100 Singles chart.)	—	79	—	—	—	—	—	—	—		Scream
"Part of Me"	2009	— (Note: "Part of Me" did not enter the Billboard Hot 100 but peaked at number 22 on the Hot Singles Sales chart.)	31	—	6	10	—	24	—	19	78		Scream
"Long Gone" (re-issue)	2009	—	—	—	—	—	—	—	—	—	—		Scream
"The Keeper"	2011	—	—	—	—	—	—	—	—	—	—		Machine Gun Preacher soundtrack
"Nearly Forgot My Broken Heart"	2015	—	—	—	—	—	—	—	—	—	—	RMNZ: Gold	Higher Truth
"Til the Sun Comes Back Around"	2016	—	—	—	—	—	—	—	—	—	—		13 Hours: The Secret Soldiers of Benghazi soundtrack
"Nothing Compares 2 U"	2016	—	—	—	—	—	—	—	—	—	—		No One Sings Like You Anymore
"The Promise"	2017	—	—	—	—	—	—	—	—	—	—		The Promise soundtrack
"When Bad Does Good"	2018	—	—	—	—	—	—	—	—	—	—		Chris Cornell
"Patience"	2020	— (Note: "Patience" did not enter the Billboard Hot 100 but peaked at number 19 on the Digital Songs chart.)	—	— (Note: "Patience" did not enter the Canadian Hot 100 but peaked at number 18 on the Canadian Digital Songs chart.)	—	—	—	—	—	—	— (Note: "Patience" did not enter the UK Singles Chart but peaked at number 14 on the UK Physical Singles Chart Top 100.)	RMNZ: Gold	No One Sings Like You Anymore
"—" denotes a recording that did not chart or was not released in that territory.

=== Other charted songs ===
List of other charted songs, with chart positions
Title	Year	Peak chart positions				Album
Title	Year	US Main	US Mod	CAN	UK	Album
"Sunshower"	1998	8	12	—	—	Great Expectations soundtrack
"Billie Jean"	2007	—	—	72	77	Carry On

== Music videos ==
Year	Title	Director
1999	"Can't Change Me"	Johan Renck
2000	"Preaching the End of the World"	Chris Cornell
2006	"You Know My Name"	Michael Haussman
2007	"No Such Thing"	Fernando Apodaca
2007	"Arms Around Your Love"	
2008	"Watch Out" (live)	
2009	"Ground Zero"	
2009	"Part of Me"	Alan Ferguson
2009	"Scream"	'Henk'
2009	"Long Gone"	Matt Alonzo
2011	"The Keeper"	
2015	"Nearly Forgot My Broken Heart"	Jessie Hill
2017	"The Promise"	Meiert Avis and Stefan Smith
2018	"When Bad Does Good"	Kevin Kerslake
2020	"Patience"	Josh Graham

== Other appearances ==
Year	Film/Game	Track(s)
1989	Say Anything...	"Toy Box", "Flower"
1990	Pump Up the Volume	"Heretic"
1990	Pacific Heights	"Hands All Over"
1992	Singles: Original Motion Picture Soundtrack	"Seasons", "Birth Ritual"
1992	Wayne's World	"All Night Thing", "Loud Love"
1993	True Romance	"Outshined"
1993	Benny & Joon	"Pushin Forward Back"
1994	S.F.W.	"Jesus Christ Pose", "Like Suicide"
1995	The Basketball Diaries	"Blind Dogs"
1996	Road Rash	"Rusty Cage", "Outshined", "Superunknown", "Kickstand"
1998	Great Expectations	"Sunshower"
1999	Blast from the Past	"Drawing Flies"
2000	Mission: Impossible 2 (soundtrack)	"Mission 2000"
2001	ATV Offroad Fury	"Spoonman"
2004	Collateral	"Shadow on the Sun"
2004	Grand Theft Auto: San Andreas	"Rusty Cage"
2005	Guitar Hero	"Cochise"
2006	FlatOut 2	"Your Time Has Come", "Man or Animal"
2006	Talladega Nights: The Ballad of Ricky Bobby	"Cochise"
2006	Miami Vice	"Shape of Things to Come", "Wide Awake"
2006	Madden NFL 07	"Revelations"
2006	Casino Royale	"You Know My Name"
2007	Rock Band	"Black Hole Sun"
2007	Bug	"Disappearing Act"
2008	Rock Band 2	"Spoonman"
2008	Rock Revolution	"Spoonman"
2010	Guitar Hero: Warriors of Rock	"Black Rain"
2013	Man of Steel	"Seasons"
2013	12 Years a Slave	"Misery Chain ft. Joy Williams"
2015	Rock Band 4	"Superunknown"
2016	Vinyl (Music from the HBO® Original Series), Vol. 1	"Stay with Me"
2018	Forever Words	"You Never Knew My Mind"

== Contributions and collaborations ==
Year	Album	Track(s)	With
1992	Sap	"Right Turn"	Alice Mudgarden
1993	Stone Free: A Tribute to Jimi Hendrix	"Hey Baby (Land of the New Rising Sun)"	M.A.C.C.
1994	The Last Temptation	"Stolen Prayer", "Unholy War"	Alice Cooper
1994	Alternative NRG: Greenpeace Compilation	"New Damage" (live)	Brian May
1997	A Very Special Christmas, Vol. 3	"Ave Maria"	Eleven
1998	Non-album	"Someone to Die For", "Heart of Honey"	Eleven
2004	Axis of Justice: Concert Series Volume 1	"(What's So Funny About) Peace, Love and Understanding"	Maynard James Keenan
2009	Good.Night.Melody	"Mister Dirt"	Joshua David
2010	Slash	"Promise"	Slash
2010	Third and Double	"Lies"	Gabin
2010	Guitar Heaven: The Greatest Guitar Classics of All Time	"Whole Lotta Love"	Carlos Santana
2012	AM/FM	"All I Have to Do Is Dream"	Rita Wilson
2015	Jekyll + Hyde	"Heavy Is the Head"	Zac Brown Band

== See also ==
- List of songs recorded by Chris Cornell
