= List of songs recorded by Chris Cornell =

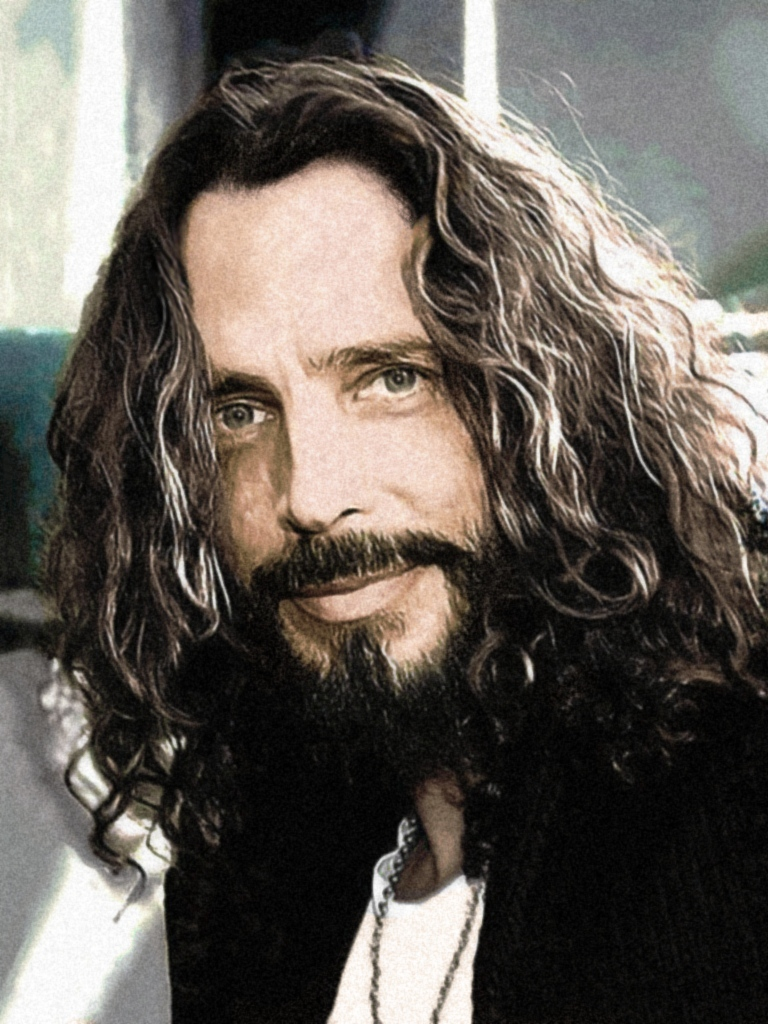
Cornell in 2011.

The following is a list of songs recorded by Chris Cornell. It features songs on which Cornell is credited as an individual artist, either lead or featured; songs by his bands Soundgarden, Temple of the Dog and Audioslave are not included on this list.

Chris Cornell was an American rock musician from Seattle, Washington. He began his career in 1984 when he co-founded the grunge band Soundgarden, and later performed with Temple of the Dog from 1990 to 1992. In 1992, Cornell released his first solo EP Poncier and contributed the song "Seasons" to the Singles soundtrack, which also featured the track "Birth Ritual" by Soundgarden. He also collaborated with Alice in Chains and Mark Arm (as "Alice Mudgarden") on "Right Turn" for the EP Sap. After Soundgarden split up in 1997, Cornell made a number of guest appearances for artists including Alice Cooper and Ramones, before releasing his debut solo album Euphoria Morning in 1999, which featured a number of songs co-written by Eleven members Alain Johannes and Natasha Shneider. From 2001 to 2007, he worked with former Rage Against the Machine members Tom Morello, Tim Commerford and Brad Wilk as part of Audioslave, who released three studio albums together.

Cornell released his second solo album Carry On in 2007, preceded by the previous year's single "You Know My Name" which was featured as the main theme tune of the James Bond film Casino Royale. The album was written entirely by the singer, with the exception of the cover version of Michael Jackson's "Billie Jean". The follow-up, 2009's Scream, was co-written with a number of hip hop and R&B producers, including Timbaland, J-Roc and Ryan Tedder, and marked a drastic change in direction for Cornell. In 2010, the singer was featured on songs by Slash, Gabin and Santana, before Soundgarden reunited for the 2012 album King Animal. In his final years Cornell focused on his solo career, releasing a number of singles as well as his fourth and final solo studio album Higher Truth. He died by suicide on May 18, 2017.

== Songs ==
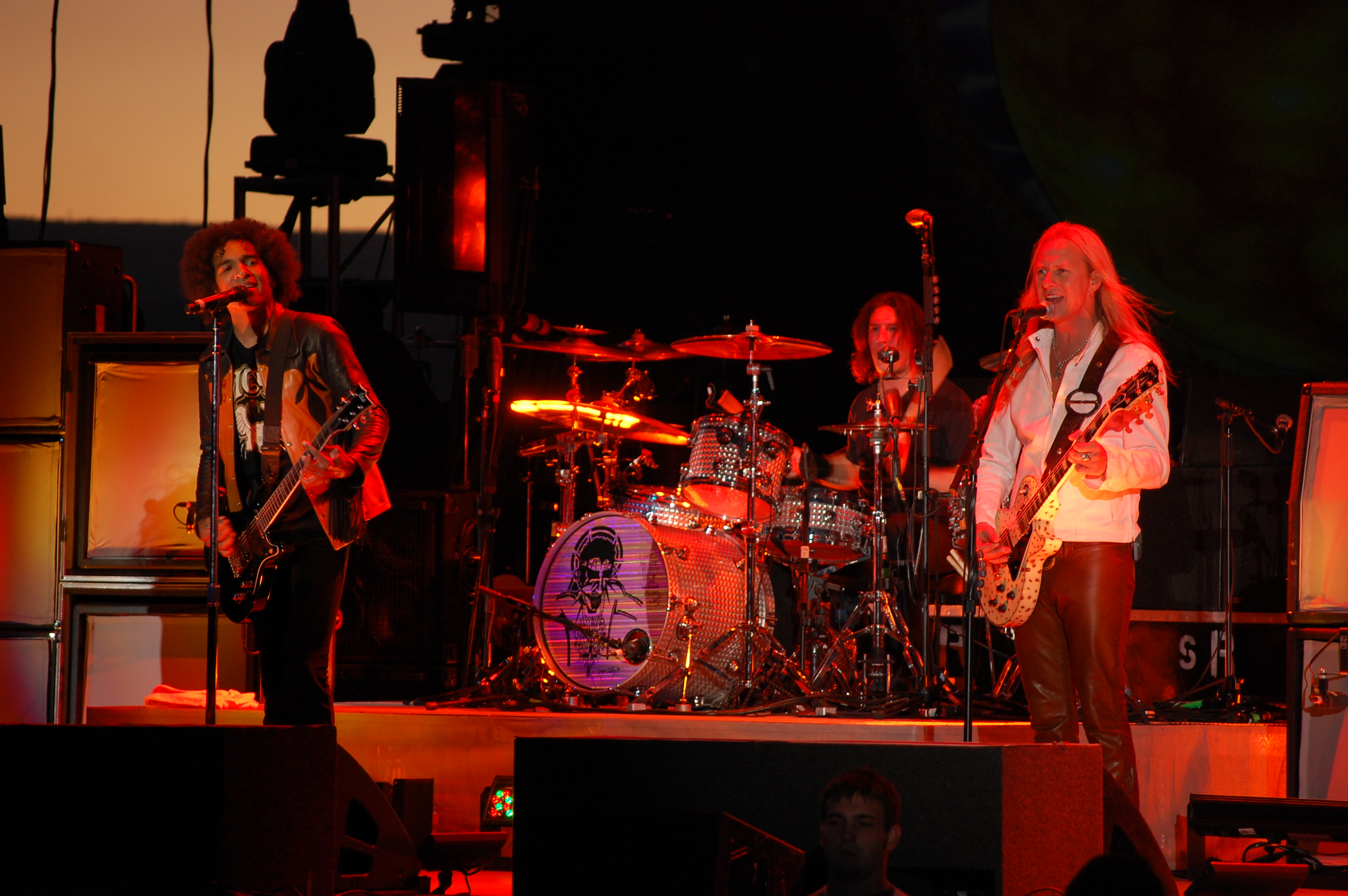
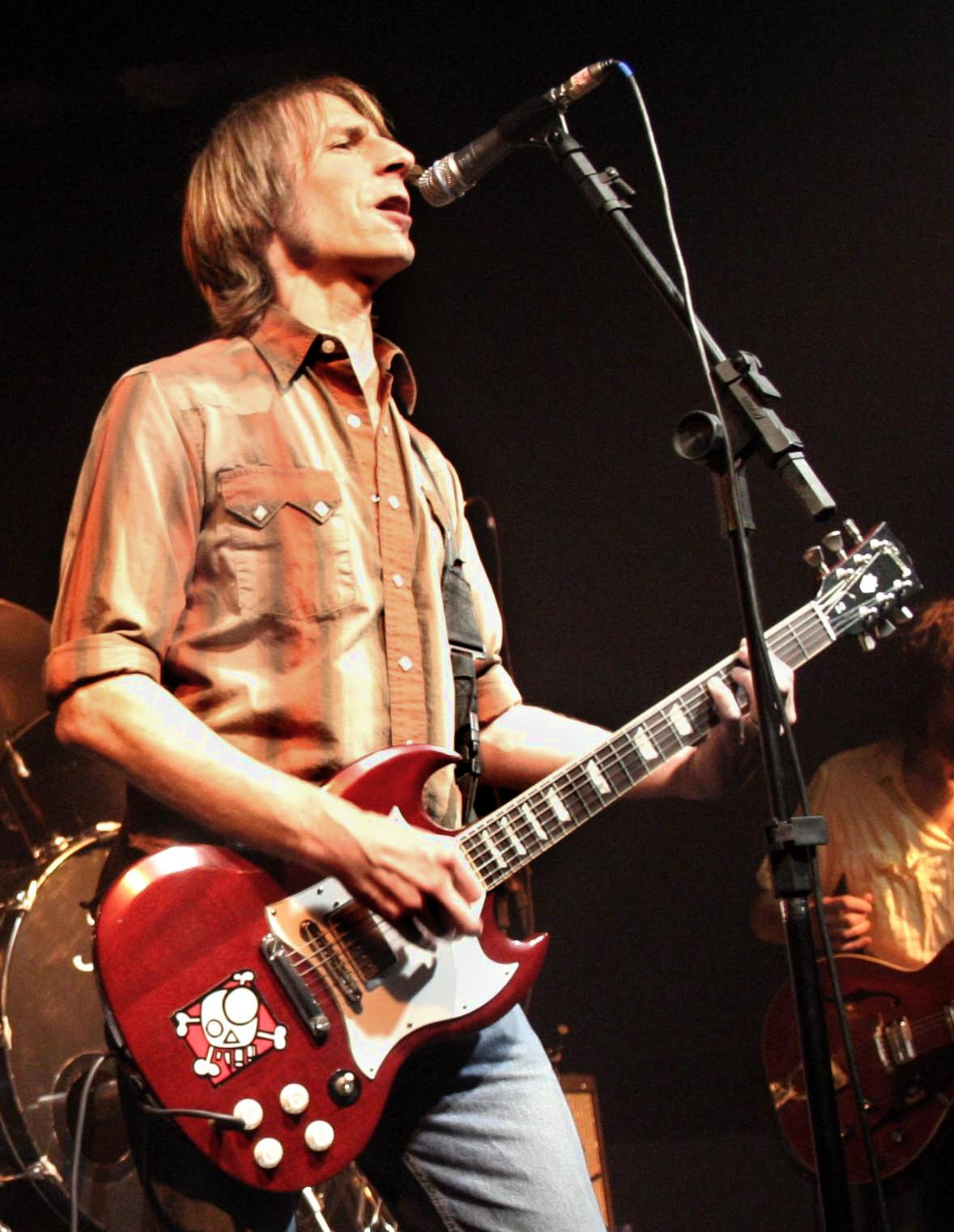
Cornell collaborated with Alice in Chains and Mudhoney frontman Mark Arm under the name "Alice Mudgarden" on the song "Right Turn" for the 1992 EP Sap.

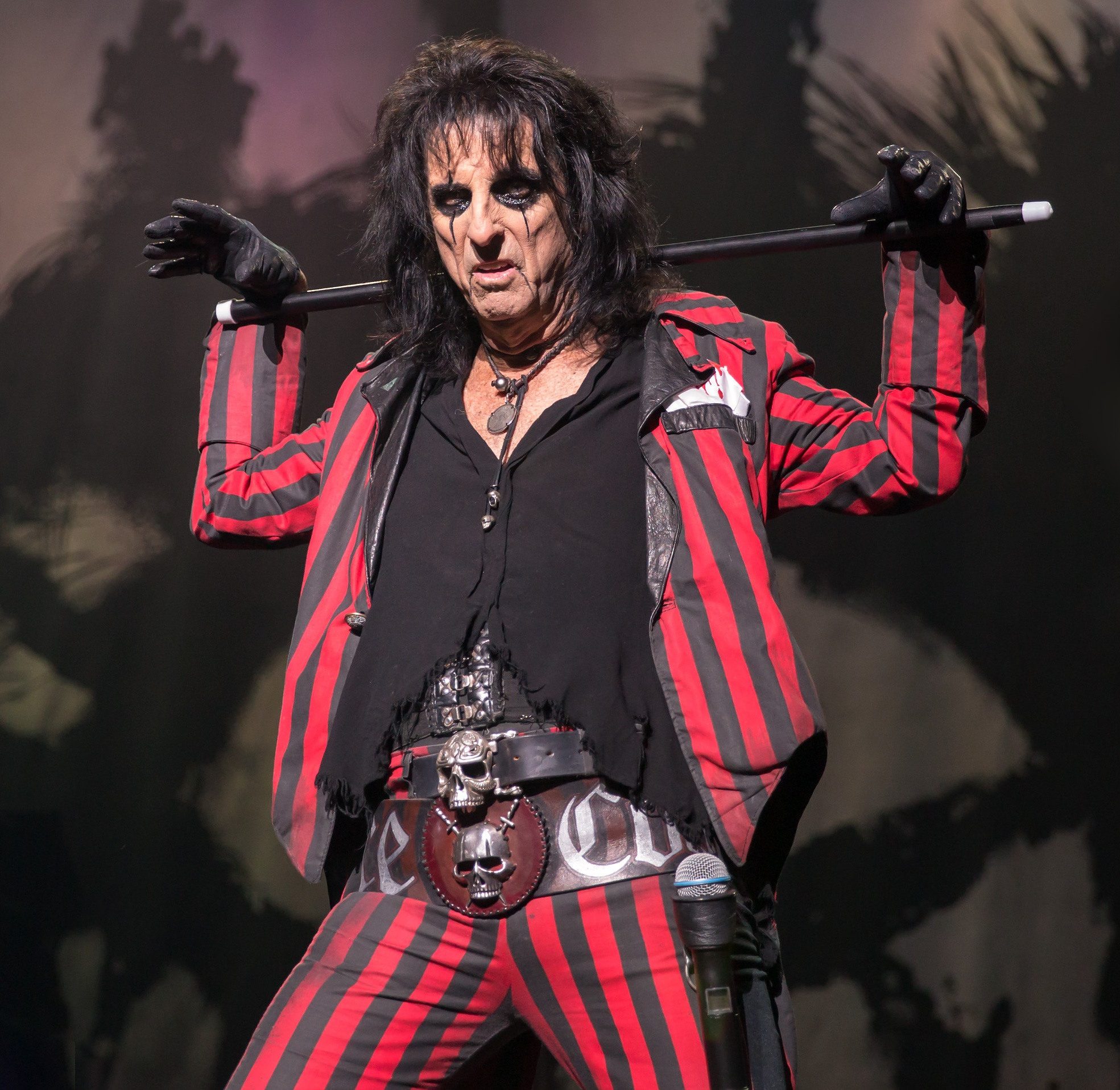
Cornell performed additional vocals on two songs on Alice Cooper's 1994 album The Last Temptation.

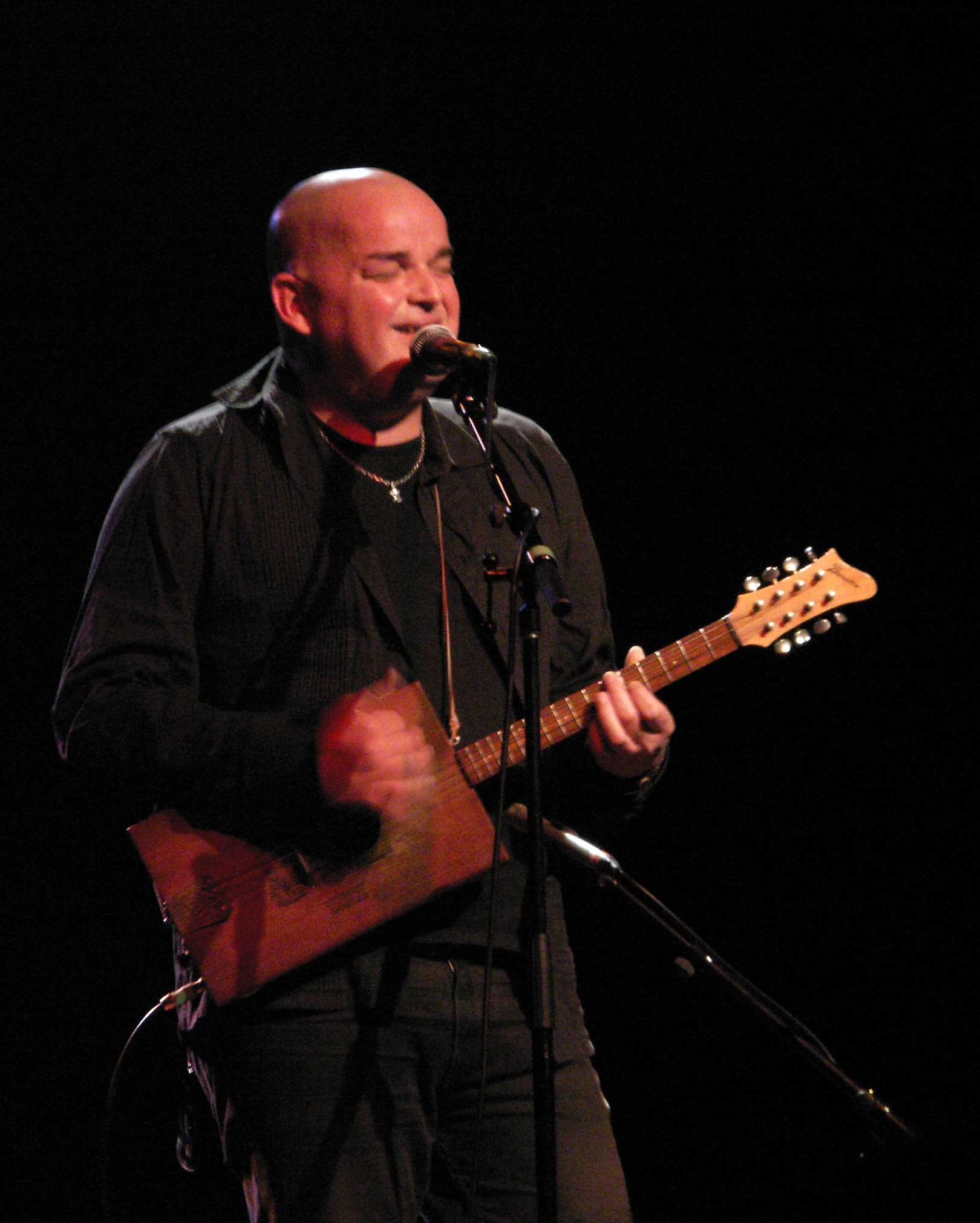
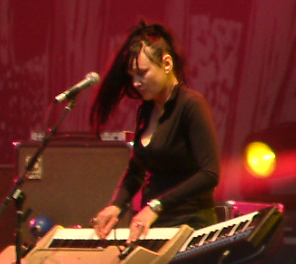
Cornell's debut solo album Euphoria Morning featured a number of songs co-written by Eleven members Alain Johannes and Natasha Shneider.

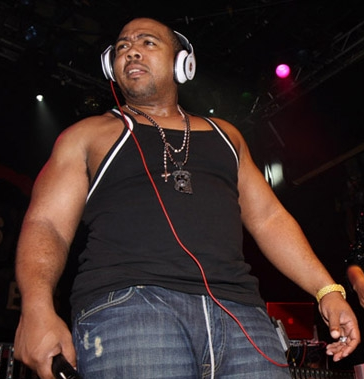
Cornell's third solo album, 2009's Scream, was co-written and produced by Timbaland, among others.

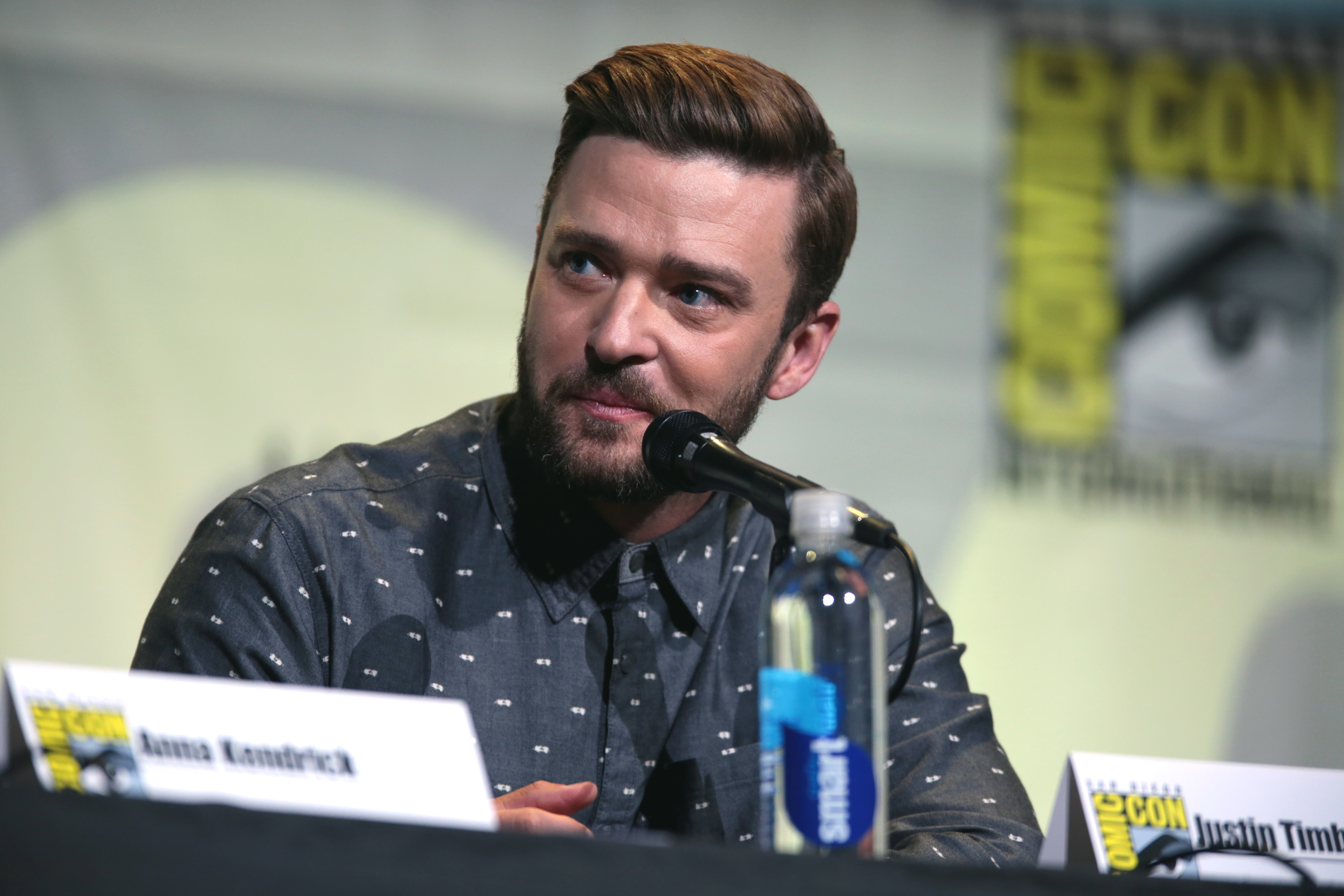
Justin Timberlake co-wrote and performed on the song "Take Me Alive", released on Scream.

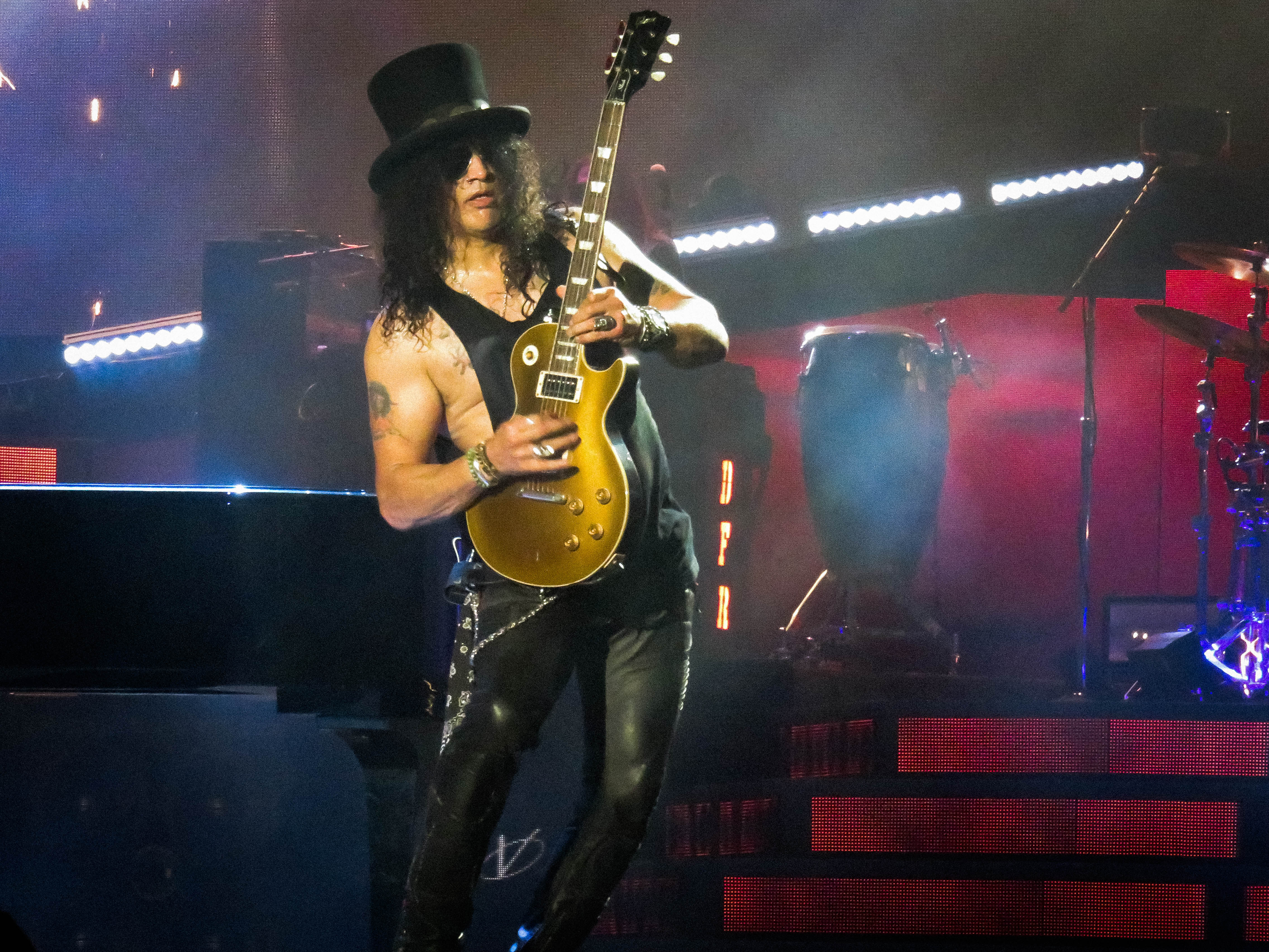
Cornell performed lead vocals on the song "Promise" for guitarist Slash's self-titled debut solo album.

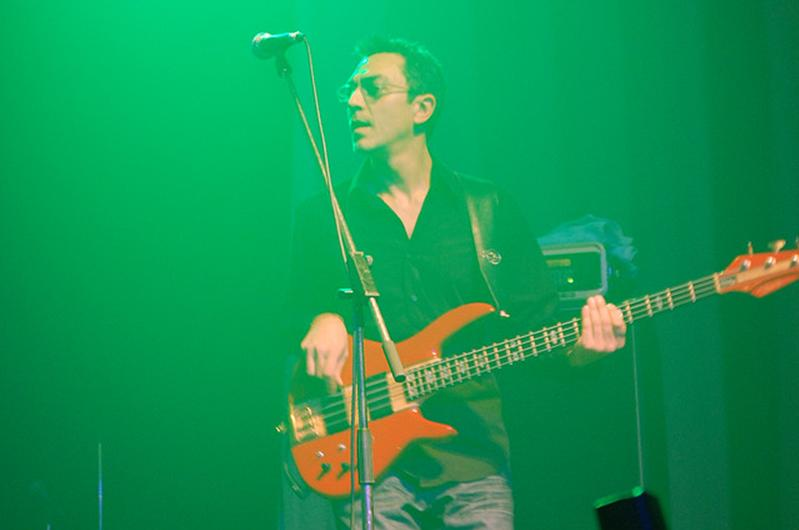
Cornell collaborated with Italian band Gabin for the 2010 song "Lies".

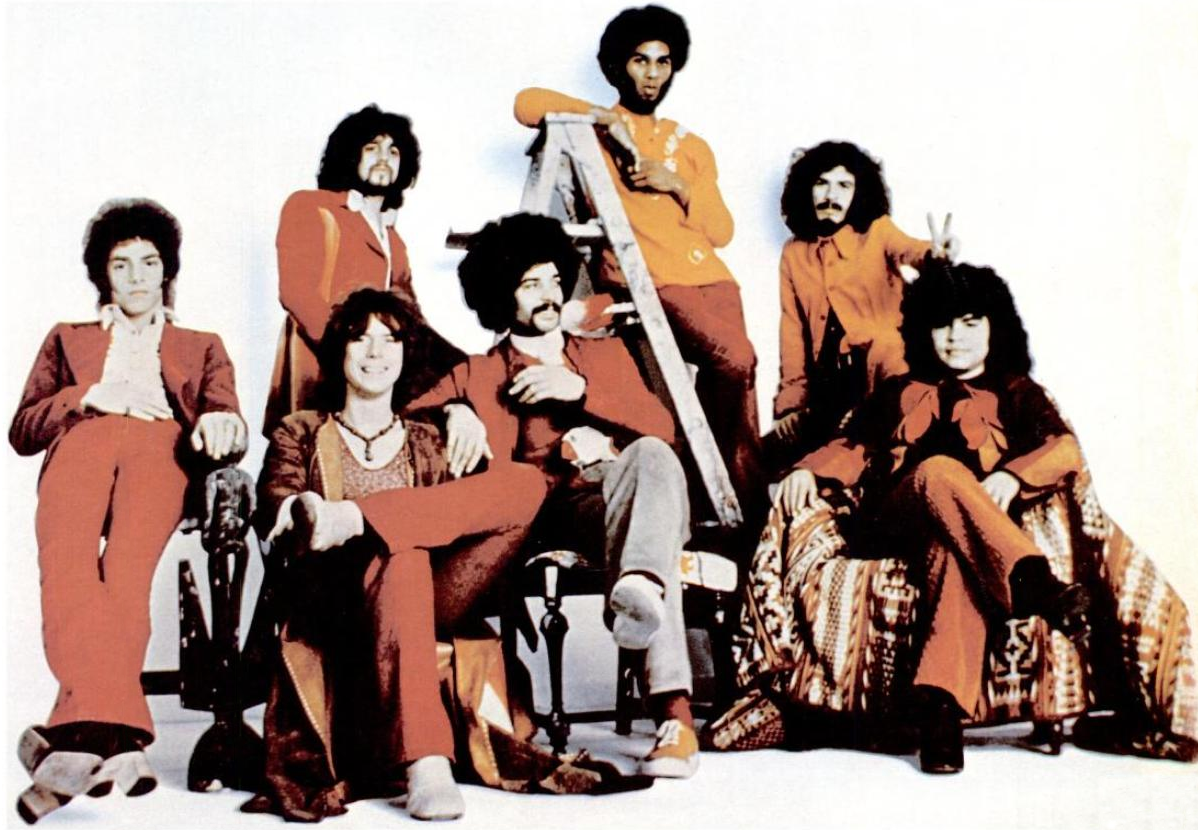
Santana featured Cornell on a cover of Led Zeppelin's "Whole Lotta Love" in 2010.

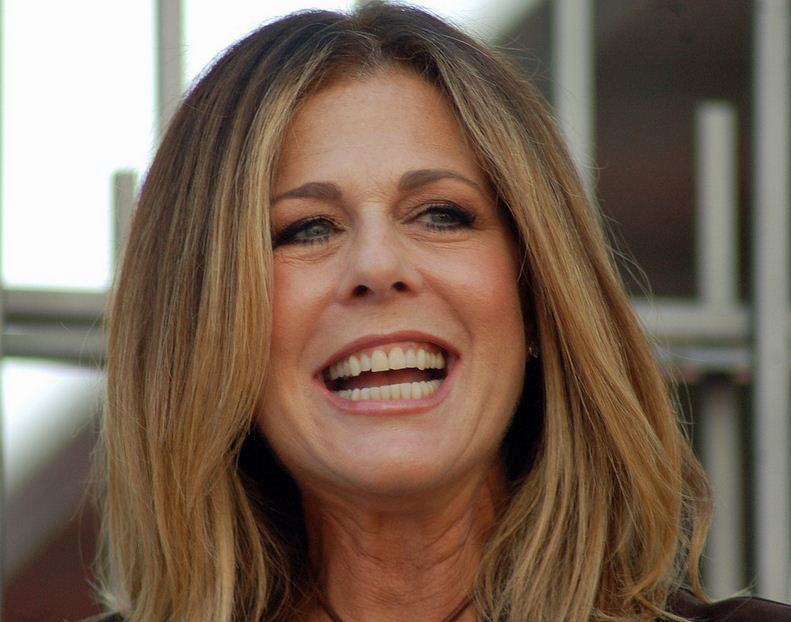
In 2012, Rita Wilson featured Cornell on a recording of "All I Have to Do Is Dream", originally by The Everly Brothers.

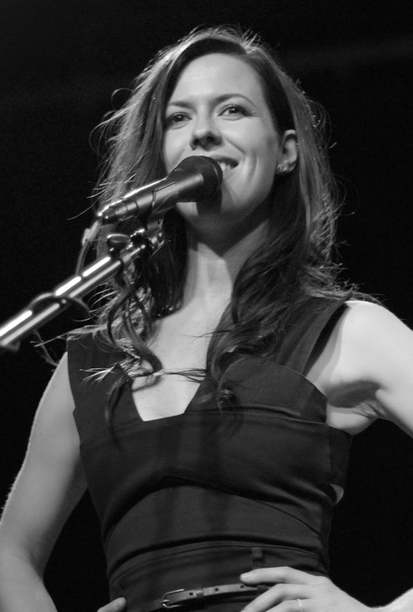
Cornell recorded an alternate version of "Misery Chain" with Joy Williams for the 12 Years a Slave film soundtrack.

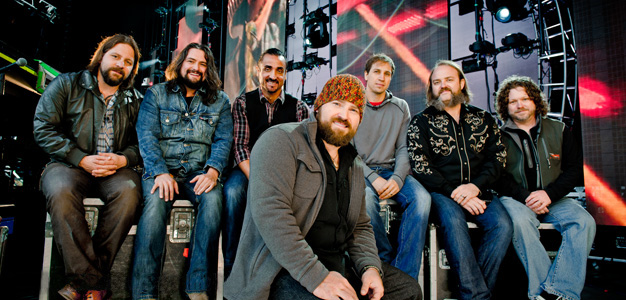
The Zac Brown Band featured Cornell on "Heavy Is the Head" in 2015.

Key
†	Indicates a song which was released as a single
‡	Indicates a song which was written solely by Cornell
#	Indicates a song on which Cornell is a featured artist

List of songs recorded by Chris Cornell
Title	Writer(s)	Release	Year	Ref.
"Alice Said" # (with Screaming Trees)	Mark Lanegan; Gary Lee Conner	Uncle Anesthesia	1991	
"All I Have to Do Is Dream" # (The Everly Brothers cover with Rita Wilson)	Boudleaux Bryant	AM/FM	2012	
"Arms Around Your Love"	Chris Cornell ‡	Carry On	2007	
"Ave Maria" # (with Eleven)	Franz Schubert	A Very Special Christmas 3	1997	
"Before We Arise" # (with Screaming Trees)	Mark Lanegan; Gary Lee Conner	Uncle Anesthesia	1991	
"Before We Disappear"	Chris Cornell ‡	Higher Truth	2015	
"Bend in the Road"	Chris Cornell ‡	Higher Truth	2015	
"Billie Jean" (Michael Jackson cover)	Michael Jackson	Carry On	2007	
"Can't Change Me" †	Chris Cornell ‡	Euphoria Morning	1999	
"Circling"	Chris Cornell ‡	Higher Truth	2015	
"Cleaning My Gun"	Chris Cornell ‡	Songbook	2011	
"Climbing Up the Walls"	Chris Cornell; Timothy Mosley; Jerome Harmon; James Washington	Scream	2009	
"Dead Wishes"	Chris Cornell ‡	Higher Truth	2015	
"Disappearing Act"	Chris Cornell ‡	Carry On	2007	
"Disappearing One"	Chris Cornell; Alain Johannes; Natasha Shneider	Euphoria Morning	1999	
"Do Me Wrong"	Chris Cornell; Timothy Mosley; Jerome Harmon	Scream	2009	
"Drive My Car" # (The Beatles cover with Beat Bugs)	John Lennon; Paul McCartney	Beat Bugs: Season 2	2016	
"Enemy"	Chris Cornell; Timothy Mosley; Jerome Harmon; Ezekiel Lewis; Balewa Muhammad; King Logan; Ryan Tedder	Scream	2009	
"Ferry Boat #3"	Chris Cornell ‡	Singles (reissue)	2017	
"Finally Forever"	Chris Cornell ‡	Carry On	2007	
"Flutter Girl" †	Chris Cornell; Alain Johannes; Natasha Shneider	Euphoria Morning	1999	
"Follow My Way"	Chris Cornell; Alain Johannes; Natasha Shneider	Euphoria Morning	1999	
"Get It While You Can" (Janis Joplin cover)	Jerry Ragovoy; Mort Shuman	No One Sings Like You Anymore, Vol. 1	2020	
"Get Up"	Chris Cornell; Timothy Mosley; Jerome Harmon	Scream	2009	
"Ghosts"	Chris Cornell ‡	Carry On	2007	
"Ground Zero" †	Chris Cornell; Timothy Mosley; Jerome Harmon; James Washington	Scream	2009	
"Heavy Is the Head" † # (with Zac Brown Band)	Zac Brown; Niko Moon; Wyatt Durrette; John Driskell Hopkins; Jimmy De Martini; Darrell Scott	Jekyll + Hyde	2015	
"Hey Baby (New Rising Sun)" # (Jimi Hendrix cover with M.A.C.C.)	Jimi Hendrix	Stone Free: A Tribute to Jimi Hendrix	1993	
"Higher Truth"	Chris Cornell ‡	Higher Truth	2015	
"Island of Summer" # (with Malfunkshun)	Chris Cornell ‡	Malfunkshun: The Andrew Wood Story	2011	
"Josephine"	Chris Cornell ‡	Higher Truth	2015	
"Jump into the Fire" (Harry Nilsson cover)	Harry Nilsson	No One Sings Like You Anymore, Vol. 1	2020	
"The Keeper" †	Chris Cornell ‡	Machine Gun Preacher	2011	
"Killing Birds"	Chris Cornell ‡	Carry On	2007	
"Let Your Eyes Wander"	Chris Cornell ‡	Higher Truth	2015	
"Lies" # (with Gabin)	Filippo Clary; Francesca Terrenato	Third and Double	2010	
"Long Gone" †	Chris Cornell; Timothy Mosley; Jerome Harmon; Ezekiel Lewis; Balewa Muhammad; Patrick Smith	Scream	2009	
"Lost Cause"	Chris Cornell; Timothy Mosley; Jerome Harmon; James Washington	Scream	2009	
"Misery Chain" # (with Joy Williams) (Note: An alternate version of "Misery Chain" without Williams was later released on Higher Truth.)	Chris Cornell ‡	12 Years a Slave	2013	
"Missing"	Chris Cornell ‡	Singles (reissue)	2017	
"Mission" (Note: An alternate version of "Mission" with the title "Mission 2000" was later released on the Mission: Impossible 2 soundtrack.)	Chris Cornell; Alain Johannes; Natasha Shneider	Euphoria Morning	1999	
"Moonchild"	Chris Cornell ‡	Euphoria Morning	1999	
"Murderer of Blue Skies"	Chris Cornell ‡	Higher Truth	2015	
"Nearly Forgot My Broken Heart" †	Chris Cornell ‡	Higher Truth	2015	
"Never Far Away"	Chris Cornell; Timothy Mosley; Jerome Harmon; Ezekiel Lewis; Balewa Muhammad	Scream	2009	
"No Such Thing"	Chris Cornell ‡	Carry On	2007	
"Nothing Compares 2 U" (Prince Nelson cover) †	Prince Nelson	No One Sings Like You Anymore, Vol. 1	2020	
"Nowhere But You"	Chris Cornell ‡	Singles	1992	
"Only These Words"	Chris Cornell ‡	Higher Truth	2015	
"Ordinary Girl"	Chris Cornell; Timothy Mosley; Jerome Harmon	Scream	2009	
"Other Side of Town"	Chris Cornell; Timothy Mosley; Jerome Harmon; James Washington	Scream	2009	
"Our Time in the Universe"	Chris Cornell ‡	Higher Truth	2015	
"Part of Me" †	Chris Cornell; Timothy Mosley; Jerome Harmon; Johnkenun Spivery; Ezekiel Lewis; Balewa Muhammad	Scream	2009	
"Patience" (Guns N' Roses cover) †	Guns N' Roses	No One Sings Like You Anymore, Vol. 1	2020	
"Pillow of Your Bones"	Chris Cornell; Alain Johannes; Natasha Shneider	Euphoria Morning	1999	
"Poison Eye"	Chris Cornell ‡	Carry On	2007	
"Preaching the End of the World" †	Chris Cornell ‡	Euphoria Morning	1999	
"The Promise" †	Chris Cornell ‡	The Promise	2016	
"Promise" # (with Slash)	Saul Hudson; Chris Cornell	Slash	2010	
"Right Turn" # (with Alice in Chains and Mark Arm) (Note: "Right Turn" is credited to "Alice Mudgarden", a combination of elements of Alice in Chains, Mudhoney and Soundgarden.)	Jerry Cantrell	Sap	1992	
"Roads We Choose"	Chris Cornell ‡	Carry On	2007	
"Sad Sad City" (Ghostland Observatory cover)	Aaron Behrens; Thomas Turner	No One Sings Like You Anymore, Vol. 1	2020	
"Safe and Sound"	Chris Cornell ‡	Carry On	2007	
"Scar on the Sky"	Chris Cornell ‡	Carry On	2007	
"Score Piece #4"	Chris Cornell ‡	Singles (reissue)	2017	
"Scream" †	Chris Cornell; Timothy Mosley; Jerome Harmon; James Washington	Scream	2009	
"Seasons"	Chris Cornell ‡	Singles	1992	
"She'll Never Be Your Man"	Chris Cornell ‡	Carry On	2007	
"Showdown" (Electric Light Orchestra cover)	Jeff Lynne	No One Sings Like You Anymore, Vol. 1	2020	
"Silence the Voices"	Chris Cornell ‡	Carry On	2007	
"Stay with Me Baby" (Lorraine Ellison cover)	Jerry Ragovoy; George David Weiss	Vinyl: Best of Season 1	2016	
"Steel Rain"	Chris Cornell; Natasha Shneider	Euphoria Morning	1999	
"Stolen Prayer" # (with Alice Cooper)	Alice Cooper; Chris Cornell	The Last Temptation	1994	
"Stop Me"	Chris Cornell; Timothy Mosley; Jerome Harmon	Scream	2009	
"Sunshower" †	Chris Cornell ‡	Great Expectations (Note: "Sunshower" was also released as a bonus track on the Japanese edition of Euphoria Morning.)	1998	
"Sweet Euphoria"	Chris Cornell ‡	Euphoria Morning	1999	
"Sweet Revenge"	Chris Cornell; Timothy Mosley; Jerome Harmon; James Washington	Scream	2009	
"Take Me Alive" # (with Justin Timberlake)	Chris Cornell; Timothy Mosley; Jerome Harmon; James Washington; Justin Timberlake	Scream	2009	
"Through the Window"	Chris Cornell ‡	Higher Truth	2015	
"'Til the Sun Comes Back Around" †	Chris Cornell ‡	13 Hours: The Secret Soldiers of Benghazi	2016	
"Time"	Chris Cornell; Timothy Mosley; Jerome Harmon; James Washington; Ezekiel Lewis; Balewa Muhammad	Scream	2009	
"To Be Treated Rite" (Terry Reid cover)	Terry Reid	No One Sings Like You Anymore, Vol. 1	2020	
"Today"	Chris Cornell ‡	Carry On	2007	
"Two Drink Minimum"	Chris Cornell; Timothy Mosley; Jerome Harmon	Scream	2009	
"Uncle Anesthesia" # (with Screaming Trees)	Mark Lanegan; Gary Lee Conner; Van Conner	Uncle Anesthesia	1991	
"Unholy War" # (with Alice Cooper)	Chris Cornell ‡	The Last Temptation	1994	
"Watch Out" †	Chris Cornell; Timothy Mosley; Jerome Harmon; James Washington	Scream	2009	
"Watching the Wheels" (John Lennon cover)	John Lennon	No One Sings Like You Anymore, Vol. 1	2020	
"Wave Goodbye"	Chris Cornell ‡	Euphoria Morning	1999	
"When Bad Does Good" †	Chris Cornell ‡	Chris Cornell	2018	
"When I'm Down"	Chris Cornell ‡	Euphoria Morning	1999	
"Whole Lotta Love" # (Led Zeppelin cover with Santana)	Jimmy Page; Robert Plant; John Paul Jones; John Bonham; Willie Dixon	Guitar Heaven: The Greatest; Guitar Classics of All Time	2010	
"Worried Moon"	Chris Cornell ‡	Higher Truth	2015	
"Wrong Side"	Chris Cornell ‡	Higher Truth	2015	
"You Don't Know Nothing About Love" (Carl Hall cover)	Jerry Ragovoy	No One Sings Like You Anymore, Vol. 1	2020	
"You Know My Name" †	Chris Cornell; David Arnold	Carry On	2006	
"You Never Knew My Mind"	Chris Cornell; Johnny Cash	Forever Words	2018	
"Your Soul Today"	Chris Cornell ‡	Carry On	2007	

== See also ==
- Audioslave discography
- Soundgarden discography
