= Chris Cornell (album) =

Compilation album by Chris Cornell
- Released: November 16, 2018
- Recorded: 1989–2016
- Genre: Alternative metal; hard rock; grunge
- Length: 76:46 (standard edition); 299:14 (deluxe box set)
- Label: UME
- Producer: Various; Brendan O'Brien

Chris Cornell chronology
Higher Truth (2015)	Chris Cornell (2018)	No One Sings Like You Anymore, Vol. 1 (2020)

Singles from Chris Cornell
- 1. "When Bad Does Good" Released: November 2018

Chris Cornell is a posthumous compilation album by American musician Chris Cornell, released on November 16, 2018. It compiles his solo work, as well as his work with his bands Soundgarden, Temple of the Dog, and Audioslave, and includes a new song titled "When Bad Does Good". The album was released in a variety of versions, including standard and deluxe versions in both digital (download and streaming) and physical formats (CD and vinyl), and a super deluxe box set that includes a total of 64 tracks, including 10 unreleased songs. Cornell's "When Bad Does Good" won a Grammy award in the Best Rock Performance category at the 61st Grammy Awards in 2019, and the album's package won a Grammy for Best Packaging at the 62nd Grammy Awards in 2020.

== Background ==
In a statement, Cornell's wife Vicky said that she felt "we needed to create a special collection to represent all of him – the friend, husband and father, the risk taker and innovator, the poet and artist. His soaring vocals found their way into the hearts and souls of so many. His voice was his vision, and his words were his peace. This album is for his fans." Many of Cornell's friends contributed to the album: Brendan O'Brien produced the album, and Jeff Ament of Pearl Jam created the artwork.

== Artwork ==
The album's artwork was designed by Jeff Ament, his brother Barry Ament, and creative director Joe Spix. It won a Grammy Award for Best Recording Package in 2020. Jeff Ament told Variety in the Grammys' press room about working on the package:

It was super emotional because we first got the call only five or six weeks after he passed. It felt too soon at that point to be thinking about that. It took us a few months to come up with some images, and it was particularly hard to have conversations with Vicky, his wife. More than anything, I wish he were here accepting this award with us."

== Critical reception ==
Professional ratings
Review scores
Source	Rating
Classic Rock	4/5 stars

Everett True of Classic Rock rated the album four stars out of five, acclaiming Cornell's "killer acoustic versions", including Michael Jackson's "Billie Jean", which he called "throbbing with restrained power", but called his covers of John Lennon's "Imagine" and the Beatles' "A Day in the Life" "ill-advised", as well as "mawkish" and a "perfunctory run-through", respectively. True felt that while "a majority of this collection is given over to Soundgarden", it is still "Cornell's voice that wins through – a star-burst of a scream, a full-throated delight."

== Track listing ==
=== Standard edition ===
All lyrics are written by by Chris Cornell, except where noted; all music is composed by Chris Cornell, except where noted.

No.	Title	Lyrics	Music	Original Album	Length
1.	"Loud Love" (Soundgarden)			Louder Than Love (1989)	4:57
2.	"Outshined" (Soundgarden)			Badmotorfinger (1991)	5:11
3.	"Hunger Strike" (Temple of the Dog) (25th anniversary mix)			Temple of the Dog (1991)	4:02
4.	"Seasons"			Singles (1992)	5:46
5.	"Black Hole Sun" (Soundgarden)			Superunknown (1994)	5:19
6.	"Can't Change Me"			Euphoria Mourning (1999)	3:22
7.	"Like a Stone" (Audioslave)		Cornell, Tim Commerford, Brad Wilk, Tom Morello	Audioslave (2002)	4:54
8.	"Be Yourself" (Audioslave)		Cornell, Commerford, Wilk, Morello	Out of Exile (2005)	4:39
9.	"You Know My Name" (from the Casino Royale soundtrack)		Cornell, David Arnold	Carry On (2007)	4:01
10.	"Billie Jean"	Michael Jackson	Jackson	Carry On (2007)	4:41
11.	"Long Gone" (rock version)			Scream (2009)	3:41
12.	"Call Me a Dog" (live at Queen Elizabeth Theatre, Toronto, 2011; originally by Temple of the Dog)			Songbook	4:51
13.	"Been Away Too Long" (Soundgarden)			King Animal (2012)	3:37
14.	"Nearly Forgot My Broken Heart"			Higher Truth (2015)	3:55
15.	"Nothing Compares 2 U" (live at SiriusXM, 2015) (previously unreleased)	Prince	Prince		5:03
16.	"The Promise"			The Promise (2012)	4:22
17.	"When Bad Does Good"			previously unreleased	4:25

=== Deluxe edition ===
Disc 1
No.	Title	Length
1.	"Hunted Down" (Soundgarden)	2:41
2.	"Kingdom of Come" (Soundgarden)	2:35
3.	"Flower" (Soundgarden)	3:26
4.	"All Your Lies" (Soundgarden)	3:50
5.	"Loud Love" (Soundgarden)	4:57
6.	"Hands All Over" (Soundgarden)	6:01
7.	"Say Hello 2 Heaven" (Temple of the Dog) (25th anniversary mix)	6:22
8.	"Hunger Strike" (Temple of the Dog) (25th anniversary mix)	4:02
9.	"Outshined" (Soundgarden)	5:11
10.	"Rusty Cage" (Soundgarden)	4:26
11.	"Seasons"	5:45
12.	"Hey Baby (Land of the New Rising Sun)" (M.A.C.C.)	5:29
13.	"Black Hole Sun" (Soundgarden)	5:18
14.	"Spoonman" (Soundgarden)	4:07
15.	"Dusty" (Soundgarden)	4:34
16.	"Burden in My Hand" (Soundgarden)	4:49

Disc 2
No.	Title	Length
1.	"Sunshower"	5:54
2.	"Sweet Euphoria"	3:06
3.	"Can't Change Me"	3:22
4.	"Like a Stone" (Audioslave)	4:53
5.	"Cochise" (Audioslave)	3:43
6.	"Be Yourself" (Audioslave)	4:39
7.	"Doesn't Remind Me" (Audioslave)	4:15
8.	"Revelations" (Audioslave)	4:11
9.	"Shape of Things to Come" (Audioslave)	4:36
10.	"You Know My Name" (from Casino Royale soundtrack)	4:01
11.	"Billie Jean"	4:41
12.	"Long Gone" (rock version)	3:41
13.	"Scream"	6:15
14.	"Part of Me" (Steve Aoki remix)	5:04
15.	"Ave Maria + Intro" (Eleven and Chris Cornell)	6:09

Disc 3
No.	Title	Length
1.	"Promise" (featuring Chris Cornell) (Slash)	4:40
2.	"Whole Lotta Love" (featuring Chris Cornell) (Santana)	3:51
3.	"Call Me a Dog" (live at Queen Elizabeth Theatre, Toronto, ON, 2011)	4:51
4.	"Imagine" (live at Pabst Theatre, Milwaukee, WI, 2011)	4:01
5.	"I Am the Highway" (live at Queen Elizabeth Theatre, Toronto, ON, 2011)	4:56
6.	"The Keeper"	3:57
7.	"Been Away Too Long" (Soundgarden)	3:37
8.	"Live to Rise" (Soundgarden)	4:39
9.	"Lies" (featuring Chris Cornell) (Gabin)	4:29
10.	"Misery Chain" (featuring Joy Williams) (from 12 Years a Slave soundtrack)	5:08
11.	"Storm" (Soundgarden)	5:23
12.	"Nearly Forgot My Broken Heart"	3:55
13.	"Only These Words"	3:28
14.	"Our Time in the Universe"	4:19
15.	"'til the Sun Comes Back Around" (from 13 Hours: The Secret Soldiers of Benghazi soundtrack)	3:46
16.	"Stay with Me Baby" (from Vinyl soundtrack)	4:16
17.	"The Promise"	4:22
18.	"When Bad Does Good" (previously unreleased)	4:25

Disc 4
No.	Title	Length
1.	"Into the Void (Sealth)" (Soundgarden) (live at the Paramount Theatre, Seattle, 1992)	7:32
2.	"Mind Riot" (Soundgarden) (live at the Paramount Theatre, Seattle, 1992)	3:54
3.	"Nothing to Say" (Soundgarden) (live at Mercer Arena, Seattle, 1996)	4:26
4.	"Jesus Christ Pose" (Soundgarden) (live at Kaiser Convention Center, Oakland, 1996)	6:21
5.	"Show Me How to Live" (Audioslave) (live in Cuba, 2005)	5:09
6.	"Wide Awake" (Audioslave song) (live in Stockholm/acoustic version extended) (previously unreleased)	4:46
7.	"All Night Thing" (live in Stockholm, Sweden, 2006) (previously unreleased)	4:01
8.	"Nothing Compares 2 U" (live at SiriusXM, 2015) (previously unreleased)	5:03
9.	"One" (Metallica/U2 songs mashup) (live at Beacon Theatre, 2015) (previously unreleased)	4:19
10.	"Reach Down" (Temple of the Dog) (live at the Paramount Theatre, Seattle, 2016) (previously unreleased)	10:38
11.	"Stargazer" (Temple of the Dog) (live at the Paramount Theatre, Seattle, 2016) (previously unreleased)	4:56
12.	"Wild World" (Chris Cornell & Yusuf Islam) (live at Pantages Theatre, 2016) (previously unreleased)	3:34
13.	"A Day in the Life" (live at the Royal Albert Hall, 2016) (previously unreleased)	5:35
14.	"Redemption Song" (featuring Toni Cornell) (live at Beacon Theatre, 2015) (previously unreleased)	4:27
15.	"Thank You" (live in Stockholm, Sweden, 2006)	4:27

== Charts ==
Chart (2018)	Peak position
Australian Albums (ARIA)	53
Austrian Albums (Ö3 Austria)	51
Belgian Albums (Ultratop Flanders)	124
Belgian Albums (Ultratop Wallonia)	101
Canadian Albums (Billboard)	92
Dutch Albums (Album Top 100)	180
German Albums (Offizielle Top 100)	39
Italian Albums (FIMI)	30
Scottish Albums (OCC)	60
Spanish Albums (PROMUSICAE)	99
Swiss Albums (Schweizer Hitparade)	39
UK Rock & Metal Albums (OCC)	2
US Billboard 200	67
US Top Alternative Albums (Billboard)	10
US Top Hard Rock Albums (Billboard)	4
US Top Rock Albums (Billboard)	14
