= Mia Cooper =

Mia Cooper may refer to:

- Mia Cooper (violinist), Irish violinist with the Michael Nyman Band
- Mia Cooper (singer), Nevada singer on The First Ten Years (Gabin album)
- Mia Cooper, The Shapeshifter
- Mia Cooper, Ghosts
