= Jeff Lipsky =

Jeff Lipsky may refer to:

- Jeff Lipsky (photographer)
- Jeff Lipsky (filmmaker)
