= Higher Truth =

Studio album by Chris Cornell
- Released: September 18, 2015
- Recorded: 2014–2015
- Genres: Rock, acoustic rock
- Length: 45:26
- Label: UM^{e}
- Producer: Brendan O'Brien

Chris Cornell chronology
Songbook (2011)	Higher Truth (2015)	Chris Cornell (2018)

Singles from Higher Truth
- 1. "Nearly Forgot My Broken Heart" Released: August 10, 2015

Higher Truth is the fourth studio album by American rock musician Chris Cornell, and the final album to be released during his lifetime. It was released on September 18, 2015.

== Recording ==
Cornell chose producer Brendan O'Brien as a collaborator to create a more intimate sound for the record. On recording drums for the album, Cornell has stated that "most of the songs with drums are either loops that I made electronically or that Brendan basically recorded just playing a little drum kit he had," Cornell says. "We just made loops, layered things and played some percussion stuff."

== Critical reception ==
Professional ratings
Aggregate scores
Source	Rating
Metacritic	68/100
Review scores
Source	Rating
AllMusic	4/5 stars
Consequence of Sound	C+
Rolling Stone	3/5 stars
Spin	5/10

Upon its release, Higher Truth received generally favorable reviews from music critics. At Metacritic, which assigns a normalized rating out of 100 to reviews from mainstream critics, the album received an average score of 68 based on 11 reviews, which indicates "generally favorable reviews". Stephen Thomas Erlewine of AllMusic said, "While Higher Truth never seems as self-consciously confessional as Euphoria Mourning, this mellow simplicity is an attribute: a relaxed Cornell creates a comforting mood piece that's enveloping in its warmth." Collin Brennan of Consequence of Sound stated, "Higher Truth ironically doesn't strive for anything higher. It stakes its claim in the rich soils of the middle ground, a place that values intimacy above innovation, quiet truths above the ones that scream. And it's all the better for it."

== Track listing ==
All tracks are written by Chris Cornell.

No.	Title	Length
1.	"Nearly Forgot My Broken Heart"	3:54
2.	"Dead Wishes"	4:55
3.	"Worried Moon"	4:32
4.	"Before We Disappear"	3:51
5.	"Through the Window"	4:41
6.	"Josephine"	3:38
7.	"Murderer of Blue Skies"	3:42
8.	"Higher Truth"	5:06
9.	"Let Your Eyes Wander"	3:42
10.	"Only These Words"	3:29
11.	"Circling"	3:28
12.	"Our Time in the Universe"	4:19
Total length:		49:17

Deluxe edition bonus tracks
No.	Title	Length
13.	"Bend in the Road"	3:37
14.	"Wrong Side"	5:13
15.	"Misery Chain"	4:42
16.	"Our Time in the Universe" (Remix)	3:58
Total length:		66:47

== Personnel ==
Credits adapted from AllMusic.

Musicians

- Chris Cornell – vocals, guitar, bass, mandolin, percussion, programming
- Brendan O'Brien – guitar, bass, keyboards, hurdy-gurdy, drums, percussion, production, mixing
- Patrick Warren – piano
- Matt Chamberlain – drums
- Anne Marie Simpson – strings

Production

- Billy Joe Bowers – engineering, mastering
- Kyle Stevens – engineering
- Tom Syrowski – engineering

Additional personnel

- Monique McGuffin – production management
- Jeff Fura – A&R
- Josh Graham – art direction
- Suspended in Light – art direction
- Liuba Shapiro – product management
- Jeff Lipsky – photography

== Charts ==
Chart (2015)	Peak position
Australian Albums (ARIA)	21
Belgian Albums (Ultratop Flanders)	80
Belgian Albums (Ultratop Wallonia)	49
Canadian Albums (Billboard)	16
Dutch Albums (Album Top 100)	77
German Albums (Offizielle Top 100)	77
Irish Albums (IRMA)	43
Italian Albums (FIMI)	62
New Zealand Albums (RMNZ)	13
Scottish Albums (Official Charts)	26
Swiss Albums (Schweizer Hitparade)	26
UK Albums (Official Charts)	37
US Billboard 200	19
US Top Catalog Albums (Billboard)	42
US Top Alternative Albums (Billboard)	4
US Top Rock Albums (Billboard)	7
