= Part of Me Remix EP =

EP by Chris Cornell
- Released: May 26, 2009
- Genre: Electronic; electropop; electronic rock
- Length: 19:27
- Label: Mosley; Interscope

Chris Cornell chronology
| Scream (2009) | Part of Me Remix EP (2009) | Songbook (2011) |

Part of Me Remix EP (also listed as Part of Me (Remix EP) in iTunes) is a digital released EP by American rock musician Chris Cornell, released on May 26, 2009. The album features four electronic pop remixes of Cornell's fifth and most recent single "Part of Me", released from his R&B and pop album Scream.

Remixes are provided by California based electro house DJ Steve Aoki, group LMFAO, electronica production team L.A. Riots and DJ Kleerup.

== Track listing ==
| No. | Title | Length |
|---|---|---|
| 1. | "Part of Me" (L.A. Riots remix) | 4:31 |
| 2. | "Part of Me" (DJ Kleerup remix) | 5:29 |
| 3. | "Part of Me" ((Party Rock remix) (featuring LMFAO)) | 4:01 |
| 4. | "Part of Me" (Steve Aoki remix) | 5:03 |
