= The Promise (Chris Cornell song) =

Single by Chris Cornell

from the album The Promise soundtrack
- Released: March 10, 2017
- Recorded: 2016
- Genre: Rock
- Length: 4:27
- Songwriter: Chris Cornell

Chris Cornell singles chronology
"Nearly Forgot My Broken Heart" (2015)	"The Promise" (2017)

"The Promise" is a song by American singer-songwriter Chris Cornell. The song was written as the ending credits song for the film of the same name. The song was released as a single on March 10, 2017, and is notable as being the last solo release from Cornell prior to his death on May 18, 2017.

== Background ==
The song was first written by Chris Cornell after being approached by movie producer Eric Esrailian to write a song for his movie, The Promise. Cornell agreed, as the film's topic—the Armenian genocide—resonated with him. While he was not personally Armenian, his wife was Greek, and her family line had been affected by the genocide. He initially had reservations, being surprised that Serj Tankian of System of a Down was not asked to write the song, as Tankian was working on the movie itself, and had been quite outspoken about the genocide in the past, though with introspection and discussions with the production staff, he came to the understanding that he was a good combination of being neither too close, nor too far removed from the subject.

Initial sessions for the song were difficult, with Cornell working a week on a completely different arrangement for the song before scrapping it and starting over. After starting over, the creation of the final version came together much faster, with Cornell no longer trying to force things on how the songs should sound.

The song was released as a charity single on March 10, 2017, to help benefit the International Rescue Committee. It received a lyric video on the same date. On April 19, 2017, he performed the song live with Soundgarden drummer Matt Cameron and a string quartet on The Tonight Show Starring Jimmy Fallon.

== Themes and composition ==
The song features Cornell on vocals, and an orchestrated instrumentation by Paul Buckmaster, a composer known for his past collaborations with Elton John and The Rolling Stones. The final version was recorded with a twenty-four-piece orchestra. The song was noted by Rolling Stone as a departure from the sound Cornell was known for with his work in grunge band Soundgarden. Spin described the track as "sounding a lot more like modern-day Peter Gabriel than Soundgarden and Audioslave." Cornell explained that the change in sound was an effort to fit the themes of the movie, stating:

I wasn't trying to record a song that sounded like it was from 1915, but I didn't want there to be obvious modern references because obviously at the time there was no such thing as the Beatles or Metallica or everything that is my reference for musical ideas. So the orchestra works just because that did exist and it can be a little bit out of time, so I was swimming in those waters of ambiguity.

The song is described as having gentle, acoustic verses leading into a powerful chorus containing a "lush orchestral" sound. The song's only live performance implemented a grand piano part as well.

== Reception ==
Consequence of Sound praised the song for being "equal parts grace and poignancy" and specifically noting that Cornell's vocals did well in evoking the painful situations conveyed in the movie. While Radio.com referred to the song as an orchestral tearjerker, Spin was overall less positive, stating that the song was "skillfully put together: tuneful and majestic" but that "it feels a little too overwrought to embrace wholeheartedly." Spin later commented on the song's live performance as well, referring to it as slightly "sappy", though conceding that the message, and its proceeds going to charity, were commendable. The song was nominated for a Grammy Award in the Best Rock Performance category for 2018, and for an International Press Academy Satellite Award for Best Original Song.
