= No One Sings Like You Anymore, Vol. 1 =

Studio album by Chris Cornell
- Released: December 11, 2020
- Recorded: 2016
- Length: 36:21
- Label: UME
- Producer: Brendan O'Brien

Chris Cornell chronology
Chris Cornell (2018)	No One Sings Like You Anymore, Vol. 1 (2020)

Singles from No One Sings Like You Anymore, Vol. 1
- 1. "Patience" Released: July 20, 2020

No One Sings Like You Anymore, Vol. 1 is the fifth studio album by Chris Cornell, released posthumously without prior announcement by his estate and Universal Music Enterprises, on December 11, 2020. It consists of ten covers sequenced and recorded by Cornell in 2016, including Harry Nilsson's "Jump into the Fire", John Lennon's "Watching the Wheels", and Prince's "Nothing Compares 2 U".

The album was preceded by Cornell's cover of Guns N' Roses' "Patience", released as a single on July 20, 2020, in honor of his 56th birthday. The single became Cornell's first solo song to hit No. 1 on Billboard's Mainstream Rock chart.

Cornell had also previously released "Stay with Me Baby" for the HBO series Vinyl, for which he was influenced by Terry Reid's version. Cornell's wife Vicky Cornell said in a statement: "This album is so special because it is a complete work of art that Chris created from start to finish. [...] He couldn't wait to release it."

The album's title is a line from the Soundgarden song "Black Hole Sun".

Physical versions of the album were released on March 19, 2021.

== Track listing ==
No One Sings Like You Anymore, Vol. 1 track listing
No.	Title	Writer(s)	Original artist(s)	Length
1.	"Get It While You Can"	Jerry Ragovoy; Mort Shuman	Janis Joplin	3:22
2.	"Jump into the Fire"	Harry Nilsson	Harry Nilsson	3:35
3.	"Sad Sad City"	Aaron Behrens; Thomas Turner	Ghostland Observatory	3:49
4.	"Patience"	Axl Rose; Izzy Stradlin	Guns N' Roses	4:13
5.	"Nothing Compares 2 U"	Prince	The Family, popularized by Sinéad O'Connor	4:12
6.	"Watching the Wheels"	John Lennon	John Lennon	3:14
7.	"You Don't Know Nothing About Love"	Jerry Ragovoy	Carl Hall	3:04
8.	"Showdown"	Jeff Lynne	Electric Light Orchestra	3:23
9.	"To Be Treated Rite"	Terry Reid	Terry Reid	3:14
10.	"Stay with Me Baby"	Jerry Ragovoy; George David Weiss	Lorraine Ellison	4:15
Total length:				36:21

== Charts ==
Chart performance for No One Sings Like You Anymore, Vol. 1
Chart (2021)	Peak position
Austrian Albums (Ö3 Austria)	75
Belgian Albums (Ultratop Flanders)	115
Belgian Albums (Ultratop Wallonia)	79
German Albums (Offizielle Top 100)	26
Italian Albums (FIMI)	100
New Zealand Albums (RMNZ)	39
Scottish Albums (OCC)	8
Swiss Albums (Schweizer Hitparade)	18
US Billboard 200	78
US Top Alternative Albums (Billboard)	8
US Top Rock Albums (Billboard)	10
