= Songbook (Chris Cornell album) =

Live album by Chris Cornell
- Released: November 21, 2011
- Recorded: March–May 2011
- Genres: Acoustic, alternative rock
- Length: 67:23
- Label: UM^{e}
- Producer: Chris Cornell

Chris Cornell chronology
Part of Me Remix EP (2009)	Songbook (2011)	Higher Truth (2015)

Singles from Songbook
- 1. "The Keeper" Released: 2011

Songbook is an acoustic live album by American musician and Soundgarden vocalist Chris Cornell, released on November 21, 2011. The live album features songs recorded during Cornell's Songbook Tour, an acoustic solo tour which took place from March to May 2011 in the US and Canada, and was his first live album as a solo artist.

The songs on the tour varied in every show, and the album was recorded during various shows on the tour, and includes songs from Cornell's whole career: solo material, Soundgarden songs, Audioslave songs, Temple of the Dog songs, as well as covers of Led Zeppelin's "Thank You" and John Lennon's "Imagine".

The album debuted on the Billboard 200 at No. 69. It has sold 86,000 copies in the US as of August 2015.

== Song Information ==
The album includes a new song by Chris Cornell, entitled "The Keeper"; the song was written exclusively for the Marc Forster directed 2011 film, Machine Gun Preacher, and released as the lead track from the film's soundtrack in August 2011. Another new song on the album is "Cleaning My Gun", a song Cornell had been playing live during his acoustic shows for years but was never previously released on an album.

The first track on the album "As Hope and Promise Fade", was previously released as a hidden track on Cornell's third solo album, Scream, under the title "Two Drink Minimum".

== Track listing ==
No.	Title	Writer(s)	Recording Date / Location	Length
1.	"As Hope and Promise Fade"	Chris Cornell, Jerome Harmon, Timothy Mosley	4/20/11 at the Queen Elizabeth Theatre in Toronto, Ontario, Canada	3:47
2.	"Scar on the Sky"	Cornell	4/10/11 at the Keswick Theatre in Glenside, Pennsylvania	3:40
3.	"Call Me a Dog" (Temple of the Dog song)	Cornell	4/20/11 at the Queen Elizabeth Theatre in Toronto, Ontario, Canada	4:51
4.	"Ground Zero"	Cornell, Harmon, Mosley, James Washington	4/22/11 at the Vic Theater in Chicago, Illinois	2:58
5.	"Can't Change Me"	Cornell	4/15/11 at the Borgata Hotel Casino & Spa in Atlantic City, New Jersey	4:18
6.	"I Am the Highway" (Audioslave song)	Cornell, Tom Morello, Tim Commerford, Brad Wilk	4/20/11 at the Queen Elizabeth Theatre in Toronto, Ontario, Canada	4:56
7.	"Thank You" (Led Zeppelin cover)	Jimmy Page, Robert Plant	4/27/11 at the Esplanade Arts & Heritage Centre in Medicine Hat, Alberta, Canada	4:48
8.	"Cleaning My Gun"	Cornell	4/23/11 at the Pabst Theatre in Milwaukee, Wisconsin	5:18
9.	"Wide Awake" (Audioslave song)	Cornell, Morello, Commerford, Wilk	4/17/11 at the Sixth I Historic Synagogue in Washington DC	3:33
10.	"Fell on Black Days" (Soundgarden song)	Cornell	4/10/11 at the Keswick Theatre in Glenside, Pennsylvania	5:05
11.	"All Night Thing" (Temple of the Dog song)	Cornell	4/17/11 at the Sixth I Historic Synagogue in Washington DC	3:25
12.	"Doesn't Remind Me" (Audioslave song)	Cornell, Morello, Commerford, Wilk	4/24/11 at the Fitzgerald Theatre in St. Paul, Minnesota	4:08
13.	"Like a Stone" (Audioslave song)	Cornell, Morello, Commerford, Wilk	4/20/11 at the Queen Elizabeth Theatre in Toronto, Ontario, Canada	4:04
14.	"Black Hole Sun" (Soundgarden song)	Cornell	4/30/11 at the Red Robinson Show Theatre in Vancouver, British Columbia, Canada	4:37
15.	"Imagine" (John Lennon cover)	John Lennon	4/23/11 at the Pabst Theatre in Milwaukee, Wisconsin	4:06
16.	"The Keeper"	Cornell	studio track	3:59

Best Buy Deluxe Edition bonus tracks
No.	Title	Writer(s)	Recording Date / Location	Length
17.	"As Hope and Promise Fade"	Cornell, Harmon, Mosley	4/15/11 at the Borgata Hotel Casino & Spa in Atlantic City, New Jersey	4:16
18.	"Call Me a Dog" (Temple of the Dog song)	Cornell	4/10/11 at the Keswick Theatre in Glenside, Pennsylvania	5:13

== Charts ==
Chart (2017)	Peak position
Australian Albums (ARIA)	21
New Zealand Albums (RMNZ)	20
