= Jeff Lipsky (photographer) =

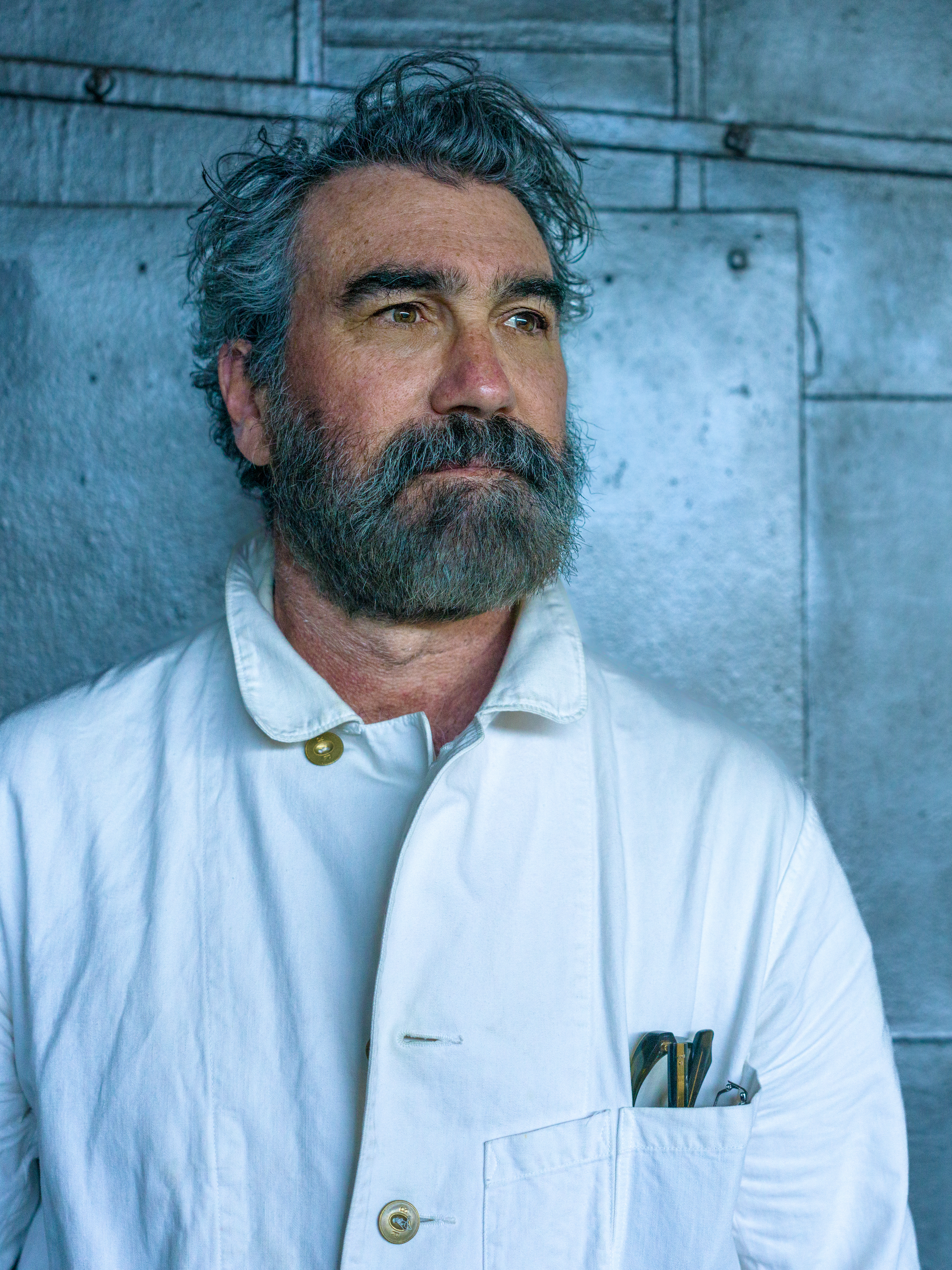
- Lipsky in 2023
- Born: August 26; Baltimore, Maryland United States
- Occupation: Photographer
- Website: jefflipsky.com

Jeff Lipsky is an American photographer specializing in celebrity and lifestyle photography. Lipsky has photographed many well-known actors and actresses for high-profile magazines, including Elliot Page for the Los Angeles Times Magazine, Mark Wahlberg for Men's Journal, Dustin Hoffman for AARP Magazine, Jonathan Rhys Meyers for Cosmopolitan, Jeremy Renner, Harrison Ford, and Jerry Seinfeld.

Before moving from Colorado to Los Angeles to pursue photography, Lipsky worked as fly-fishing guide and snowboarder. He has carried over his love of the outdoors into his work as a photographer, having shot more than 30 stories for Outside magazine. In advertising, he has photographed campaigns for Baume & Mercier, J Brand, and MTV.

Lipsky is based in Los Angeles and is represented by foureleven.
