= Forever Words =

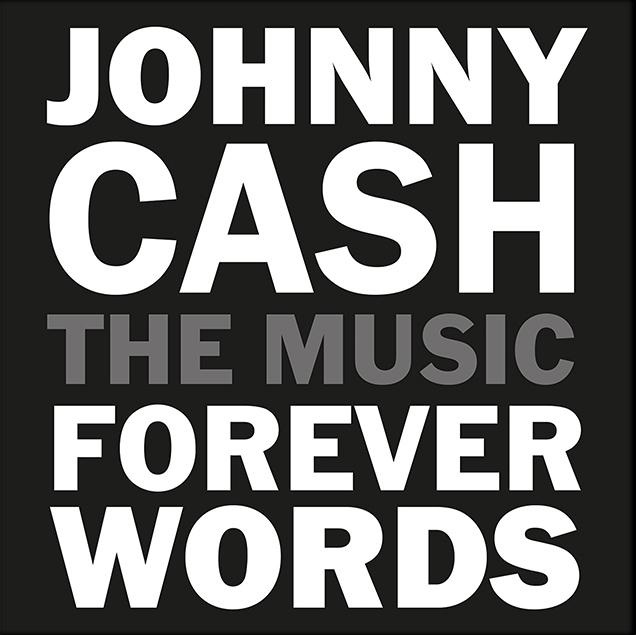

Studio album by various artists
- Released: April 6, 2018
- Genres: Country Folk, Americana
- Language: English
- Label: Legacy
- Producer: John Carter Cash

Professional ratings
Aggregate scores
Source	Rating
Metacritic	75/100
Review scores
Source	Rating
Classic Rock Germany	8/10
Gaffa	4/6 stars

Forever Words is a 2018 album by various artists recording poetry and lyrics by Johnny Cash set to music for the first time. The album follows a 2016 book release of the poems entitled Forever Words: The Unknown Poems (ISBN 0399575138). The album includes a posthumously released track by Chris Cornell, who died in 2017. In 2020 and 2021, a deluxe version of the album was released in four waves, with a total of 18 additional songs. The first and second waves were released on October 23 and December 11, 2020 with the two remaining waves set for release on February 5 and April 2, 2021 respectively.

== Track listing ==
1. "Forever/I Still Miss Someone" – Kris Kristofferson and Willie Nelson
2. "To June This Morning" – Ruston Kelly and Kacey Musgraves
3. "Gold All Over the Ground" – Brad Paisley
4. "You Never Knew My Mind" – Chris Cornell
5. "The Captain's Daughter" – Alison Krauss and Union Station
6. "Jellico Coal Man" – T-Bone Burnett
7. "The Walking Wounded" – Rosanne Cash
8. "Them Double Blues" – John Mellencamp
9. "Body on Body" – Jewel
10. "I'll Still Love You" – Elvis Costello
11. "June's Sundown" – Carlene Carter
12. "He Bore It All" – Dailey & Vincent
13. "Chinky Pin Hill" – I'm with Her
14. "Goin', Goin', Gone" – Robert Glasper featuring Ro James and Anu Sun
15. "What Would I Dreamer Do?" – The Jayhawks
16. "Spirit Rider" – Jamey Johnson

Deluxe Edition:

17. "Big Hearted Girl" – Hard Working Americans
18. "I'm Comin' Honey" – Shawn Camp
19. "Brand New Pair of Shoes" – Ana Christina Cash
20. "If You Loved Me" – Elvis Costello and the Imposters
21. "I've Been Around" – Marty Stuart
22. "Who's Gonna Grease My Skillet?" – John Popper
23. "California Poem" – Jamey Johnson, Sam Bush and Jerry Douglas
24. "Little Patch of Grass" – Brandon Robert Young and Clare Bowen
25. "The Dogs Are In The Woods" – John McEuen
26. "Does Anybody Out There Love Me?" – Jewel
27. "Autumn" – Watkins Family Hour
28. "Let It Be Tonight" – Ira Dean
29. "Pretty Pictures in My Mind" – The Lumineers
30. "Outta Site Tonite" – Ronnie Dunn and Brad Paisley
31. "My Song" – Runaway June
32. "Dark and Bloody Ground" – Ruston Kelly
33. "The Third Degree" – Aaron Lewis
34. "Tecemseh" – Bill Miller

== Personnel ==
- T. Bone Burnett
- Chris Cornell
- Elvis Costello
- Jamey Johnson
- Kris Kristofferson
- Jewel
- Willie Nelson
- John Mellencamp
- Brad Paisley
- Kacey Musgraves
- Rosanne Cash
- Alison Krauss
- Carlene Carter
- I'm with Her (band)

== Charts ==
Chart performance for Forever words
Chart (2018)	Peak position
Australian Albums (ARIA)	19
Austrian Albums (Ö3 Austria)	52
Belgian Albums (Ultratop Flanders)	30
Belgian Albums (Ultratop Wallonia)	118
Dutch Albums (MegaCharts)	28
German Albums (Offizielle Top 100)	48
New Zealand Heatseeker Albums (RMNZ)	8
Swiss Albums (Schweizer Hitparade)	40
US Billboard 200	66
US Billboard Country Albums	9

== See also ==
- New Multitudes (2012), a similar project for Woody Guthrie lyrics
- Lost on the River: The New Basement Tapes (2014), a similar project for Bob Dylan lyrics and featuring Burnett and Costello
- Out Among the Stars (2014), a posthumous Cash album composed of abandoned sessions which also features Elvis Costello
