= Scream (Chris Cornell song) =

Single by Chris Cornell

from the album Scream
- Released: September 22, 2008
- Genre: Pop rock
- Length: 6:15 (album version); 3:57 (video mix)
- Label: Mosley; Interscope; Universal
- Songwriters: Chris Cornell; Timothy Mosley; Leslie Harmon; James Washington
- Producers: Timbaland; J-Roc

Chris Cornell singles chronology
"Ground Zero" (2008)	"Scream" (2008)	"Part of Me" (2008)

Music video
- "Scream" on YouTube

"Scream" is a song by American musician Chris Cornell, from his third solo studio album, Scream. "Scream" is the first official single for the US (and fourth overall) and was released on September 22, 2008. Timbaland is featured in an interlude of the song, but is not credited as a featured artist.

== Music video ==
A video was also shot for the album's title track, with director Alan Ferguson (Fall Out Boy, Gym Class Heroes). Filmed in Orange, California, the clip reflects the feel of the album, he said.

"The idea Alan had for the video, which is pretty ingenious, is sort of capturing the two moods of the music," he said. "There's kind of two things going on. It's a record that's 111 beats per minute, which is fast. But the music and lyrics and the vocals are actually kind of slow and relaxed and flowing over this beat that's pretty uptempo and kind of chaotic and excited. The way Alan's shot the video, he's shooting both at the same time. My role in the video is performing the song in super-slow-motion, where I'm existing in this Zen-like world, singing these song lyrics and everything going on around me is super-fast, super-chaotic, and I'm just suspended in it. It's a filmic piece that has something to say about the song lyrics and the feel of the music. It's going to be very much a cinematic video.

The video premiered on Yahoo! Music on December 15.

== Official remix ==
There is at least one official remix of "Scream" available, having been remixed by DJ Dean Coleman. The track hasn't been officially released in full however, save for a small section of it appearing on the Scream: The Mixtape release (an official digital-only mixtape put together by Cornell and DJ Skee), a shortened Radio Edit streaming on Dean Coleman's MySpace, and that same shortened version being applied to an official special version of the "Scream" music video.

== Chart positions ==
Chart (2008)	Peak position
Canada Singles Top 100	79
US Billboard Bubbling Under Hot 100 Singles	10
