= Part of Me (Chris Cornell song) =

Single by Chris Cornell

from the album Scream
- Released: October 14, 2008
- Length: 5:14 (album version); 3:35 (radio mix)
- Label: Mosley; Interscope; Universal
- Songwriters: Chris Cornell; Timothy Mosley; Jerome Harmon; Johnkenun Spivery; The Clutch – (Ezekiel Lewis and Balewa Muhammad)
- Producers: Timbaland; J-Roc

Chris Cornell singles chronology
"Scream" (2008)	"Part of Me" (2008)	"Stop Me" (2009)

"Part of Me" is a song by American musician Chris Cornell, from his third solo studio album, Scream (2009). "Part of Me" is the first official single for Canada and Europe (and second official single overall) and was released as a digital download on October 12, 2008 in Canada and Germany. There is no indication of a release in the US. The non-explicit version of the song was previewed on Virgin Radio 99.9, where listeners were encouraged to enter a poll of the audience's reaction to the song. The album version of the song was leaked on November 12, featuring an outro that seamlessly integrates into "Time", the next track on Scream. California DJ Steve Aoki also made a remix of the song which can be downloaded for free in MP3 off his record label's official website, while his remix also appears on the official "Part of Me (Remix EP)" digital release.

== Background ==
This song refers to a fictional (or otherwise) incidence in lusting after a girl (and a possible 'fling'): "I want the girl but I want a lot, Might cross my mind but that's where it stops." Cornell explains to an established lover that "But I swear it never meant a thing, she was just a fling."

== Music video ==
A music video for this song was produced for the Canadian, UK and Ireland single release. However, the video is available in other European countries. Timbaland makes a cameo in the video. The video also features cameo appearances from heavyweight boxing champion Wladimir Klitschko and Wu-Tang Clan rapper Method Man.

== Charts ==
Chart (2009–2012)	Peak position
Ö3 Austria Top 40	31
Danish Singles Chart	6
Finnish Singles Chart	10
German Singles Chart	24
Hungarian Airplay Chart	31
Swiss Singles Chart	19
UK Singles Chart	78
US Billboard Hot Dance Singles Sales	9
US Billboard Hot Singles Sales	22

== Release history ==
Region	Date	Format
Germany	October 14, 2008	Digital download
Canada	October 21, 2008	Digital download
United Kingdom	March 9, 2009	Digital download
