= The Promise (2016 film) =

2016 historical drama film by Terry George

- Theatrical release poster
- Directed by: Terry George
- Written by: Terry George; Robin Swicord
- Produced by: Eric Esrailian; Mike Medavoy; William Horberg
- Starring: Oscar Isaac; Charlotte Le Bon; Christian Bale; Daniel Giménez Cacho; Shohreh Aghdashloo; Marwan Kenzari; Angela Sarafyan; James Cromwell; Igal Naor
- Cinematography: Javier Aguirresarobe
- Edited by: Steven Rosenblum
- Music by: Gabriel Yared
- Production company: Survival Pictures
- Distributed by: Open Road Films
- Release dates: September 11, 2016 (Toronto); April 21, 2017 (U.S.)
- Running time: 134 minutes
- Country: United States
- Language: English
- Budget: $90 million
- Box office: $12.4 million

The Promise is a 2016 American epic historical war drama film directed by Terry George, from a screenplay he co-wrote with Robin Swicord. Set in the final years of the Ottoman Empire, the film stars Oscar Isaac, Charlotte Le Bon, and Christian Bale. The plot is about a love triangle that develops between Mikael (Isaac), an Armenian medical student, Chris (Bale), an American journalist, and Ana (Le Bon), an Armenian-born woman raised in France, immediately before and during the Armenian genocide.

The Promise premiered on September 11, 2016, at the Toronto International Film Festival, and was released by Open Road Films in the United States on April 21, 2017, on the 102nd anniversary of the week the Armenian genocide started. The film received mixed reviews from critics and was a box office bomb, grossing just $12 million against its $90 million budget and losing Open Road over $100 million. However, the studio noted the main purpose of the film was to bring attention to the story, not make money, with George saying that "audiences learn more from films today than they do from history books." The film also features "The Promise", which was the final single released by Chris Cornell, who died less than a month after the film's U.S. release.

== Plot ==
Mikael Boghosian is an apothecary who lives in the small Armenian village of Siroun near the southeastern coast of Turkey, within the Ottoman Empire. In order to help pay the expenses for medical school, he promises to marry Maral, the daughter of an affluent neighbor, receiving 400 gold coins as a dowry. This allows him to travel to Constantinople and attend the Imperial School of Medicine.

There, Mikael befriends Emre, the son of a high-ranking Ottoman official. Through his wealthy uncle, he also meets Ana Khesarian, an Armenian woman raised in Paris, who is involved with an American reporter for the Associated Press, Chris Myers. Mikael falls in love with Ana just as international tensions begin to rise with the outbreak of World War I.

Mikael temporarily manages to avoid conscription into the Ottoman Army through a medical student exemption with the help of Emre. When he, with Emre's help, tries to save his uncle from imprisonment during the roundups of April 24, 1915, he is detained and sent to a labor camp, while Emre is conscripted as a consequence for helping Mikael a second time after his father warned him not to.

Mikael eventually escapes the camp. Returning to his village, he finds that the townspeople of Turkish background have violently turned on their fellow townspeople of Armenian background. His parents, and particularly his mother, persuade him to marry Maral and seek refuge in a remote mountain cabin, where she soon becomes pregnant.

A difficult pregnancy leads Mikael to bring his wife back to the care of his mother in the village. There he learns that Ana and Christopher are at a nearby Red Cross facility, so he goes to seek their help for his family to escape the imminent Turkish threat.

Departing the mission with a group of orphans, they head back to Siroun to retrieve Mikael's family. Along the way, however, they encounter the site of a massacre. It soon becomes clear the victims comprise all of Siroun's inhabitants, including all Mikael's family except his mother and cousin Yeva, killed by Ottoman troops. Mikael's wife is found with their unborn child cut out from her body.

Chris is captured by Ottoman soldiers and sent back to Constantinople, charged with being a spy for the Allied Powers and, while held at Selimiye Barracks, slated for execution by the authorities. With the help of Emre, and through the intercession of American Ambassador Henry Morgenthau, Chris is released and deported to Malta. Once there, he boards the French cruiser Guichen, as it prepares to set sail along the Ottoman coast. Emre's role in helping to save Chris is discovered and he is executed by firing squad.

Escaping pursuit, Mikael, Ana, and the orphans join a large group of refugees determined to fight off the Ottoman Army on Mount Musa Dagh. As they fend off repeated assaults, Mikael's mother succumbs to her wounds and is buried on the mountain. The refugees hold on long enough to escape on the back side to the coast as the Guichen comes to evacuate them. But as the lifeboats return to the ship, a Turkish artillery barrage throws Ana and Yeva, the young daughter of Mikael's uncle, overboard. Mikael jumps in after them and is able to rescue Yeva, but Ana drowns.

In a voice over, Mikael recounts that he adopted Yeva and together they settled in Watertown, Massachusetts while Chris was killed reporting the Spanish Civil War in 1938. During Yeva's wedding reception in 1942, with the now grown Armenian orphans in attendance, Mikael presides over a toast, wishing good fortune to their families and future generations to come.

== Cast ==
- Oscar Isaac as Mikael Boghosian, an Armenian medical student from the town of Siroun. Pietro A. Shakarian wrote in The Nation that Mikael "represents the aspirations of Ottoman Armenians" and that he "is almost like a hero in a work by one of the great Armenian national writers like Raffi or Khachatur Abovian".
- Charlotte Le Bon as Ana Khesarian, an Armenian artist who was raised in Paris and studied at the Sorbonne. George stated that Ana represents a foreign-born "avant-garde, socially liberated woman" to Chris while she is drawn to Mikael as she rediscovers her Armenian roots. George experienced difficulty in casting Ana's role and indicated that he chose Le Bon after seeing her in a Canadian fashion magazine and meeting her in person as she would be able to play "a strong and independent character who could attract two very different types of men."
- Christian Bale as Christopher Myers, a world-renowned American journalist with the Associated Press. Chris is a composite character of "a number of eyewitness reporters who witnessed sections of the genocide." Christian Bale joined the film production prior to the selection of George as the director. Bale studied Lincoln Steffens and other period journalists, such as Christopher Hitchens, as well as meeting with people who studied the genocide.
- Marwan Kenzari as Emre Ogan, a notorious Turkish playboy and son of a diplomat. Ara Sarafian, director of the Gomidas Institute in London and a leading historian of the Armenian genocide, stated that it was "historically important" to have characters representing "righteous Muslims", including Emre. Shakarian states that Emre "represents the friendships that existed between Armenians and Muslims before the genocide and those Muslims who, later, went out of their way to save their Armenian friends and neighbors."
- Shohreh Aghdashloo as Marta Boghosian, Mikael's mother.
- Angela Sarafyan as Maral, Mikael’s betrothed in Siroun.
- Daniel Giménez Cacho as Reverend Dikran Antreassian, a clergyman from Bassek who joins the resistance at Musa Dagh.
- Tom Hollander as Garin, a former circus clown who is held prisoner in a labor camp.
- Numan Acar as Mustafa, a Turk working for the American Red Cross driving orphans to safety.
- Igal Naor as Mesrob Boghosian, Mikael’s wealthy uncle who owns a fabric store in Constantinople.
- Milene Mayer Gutierrez as Yeva Boghosian, one of Mesrob's and Lena’s two daughters.
  - Sofia Black-D'Elia plays an older Yeva in the film's epilogue.
- Tamer Hassan as Faruk Pasha, an official in the Ottoman army.
- Rade Šerbedžija as Stephan, the Mayor of Bassek, who leads the Armenian residents of Bassek to safety.
- Alicia Borrachero as Lena Boghosian, Mesrob’s wife.
- Abel Folk as Harut, Maral’s wealthy father.
- Jean Reno as the French naval Admiral Louis Dartige du Fournet
- James Cromwell as the American ambassador to the Ottoman Empire, Henry Morgenthau Sr.
- Kevork Malikyan as Vartan Boghosian, Mikael’s father.
- Stewart Scudamore as Ogan Pasha, Emre’s father, a Turkish diplomat.

Other actors in the film include Andrew Tarbet as Pastor Merrill, Aaron Neil as Talaat Pasha, Ozman Sirgood as Hasan Mazhar, Aharon Ipalé as Dr. Nazim, Lucía Zorrilla as Tamar, Roman Mitichyan as Van, Armin Amiri as Ali, Shnorhk Sargsyan as Komitas, Anthony Rotsa as Ahmet, Michael Stahl-David as Brad, Marco Khan as a Turkish nightwatchman, Simón Andreu as an Armenian peasant, and Vic Tablian as an Armenian prisoner.

== Production ==
=== Financing, casting and research ===
The story of The Promise was based on an unproduced screenplay titled Anatolia by Robin Swicord, though Terry George completely rewrote the screenplay. Swicord says, "There’s some very fragmentary bits of my story that are in there, but he invented the Christian Bale character and changed the other characters. I had a medical student in my screenplay, but he wasn’t at all like the character in The Promise." George stated that he added Chris and lengthened the storyline to illustrate the scope of the genocide. The original script only focused on Mikael and his family.

George, who directed human rights-related films, became interested in the Armenian genocide as a filming topic after reading chapters about it in A Problem from Hell while doing research for Hotel Rwanda. George traveled to Armenia and Turkey to do further research on the topic. He became involved with this project after reading Swicord's script, which his agent had sent to him.

The entire $100 million budget was donated by Armenian-American Kirk Kerkorian, as Kerkorian did not have expectations of the film generating profits. As of 2017 the budget was the highest of any film about the Armenian genocide. The donation of the budget meant that the Turkish government would have been unable to pressure the studio into canceling the film, as it had done in the past with other productions. George stated that the film "would not exist" without Kerkorian, who gave approval to the script prior to his death in 2015, but did not live to see it filmed and finished. Kerkorian and co-producer Esrailian, the latter of whom had great-grandparents who lived through the genocide, organized Survival Pictures as the production company. Esrailian became interested in studying the Armenian genocide while a university undergraduate, and received a master's degree in public health, a degree which he said enhanced his understanding of demography.

Bale and Isaac were cast in June 2015, while Le Bon, Cromwell, Reno, Aghdashloo and Giménez-Cachowere were all confirmed by September.

Esrailian said that he used a romance plot in order to "use old fashioned storytelling" to immerse an unfamiliar audience into the plot, hoping to avoid making the film only "a history lesson" and making a "throwback to cinema" like Doctor Zhivago or Lawrence of Arabia; in another interview he also cited Casablanca. Esrailian stated that he would have encountered less difficulty producing "a straightforward genocide story" but chose to use the romance angle anyway.

George prepared for the film by reading Armenian Golgotha, which discusses the extent of and survival of the genocide; and The Burning Tigris, which discusses journalists documenting the genocide. George said that he deliberately used a 1970s production style and that he intended to reach the average common movie-goer, using the analogy of "is 'Hotel Rwanda' going to play in Peoria? Will it be understood? Is it main stream [sic] enough?" George also stated that he extensively fact-checked historical details to ensure they reflected what happened in reality. Crow stated that the film reminded him of David Lean's works, and Esrailian responded by stating the production crew had discussed that style of filming.

George chose to make the film with English as its single medium as he felt it would be too confusing for a moviegoer to manage hearing multiple languages spoken throughout the film. The final scene of a toast is given in Armenian.

=== Filming ===
Filming began in Autumn 2015 in Portugal, Malta, and Spain, with the shooting scheduled to last until December.

Filming sites in Portugal included the National Museum of Natural History and Science, Lisbon, and the Lisbon School for Hospitality and Tourism held a casting call for film extras. Filming sites in Spain included the Canary Islands.

There were seventy days of production. Reshoots took place in New York in May and June 2016, ending in early June. Joe Berliger, director of the documentary Intent to Destroy, embedded in the filming crew of The Promise to shoot his own documentary. George stated that he took two months of research in comparing photographs of Ottoman-era Turkey and prospective filming locations to make the proper selections.

Security details were arranged during filming due to political sensitivities around the Armenian genocide. For the same reason, the producers did not issue publicity for the film during the filming process. Berlinger stated, in regard to safety issues, "A lot of that is overblown — I think we’ve gone from historical assassinations to digital assassinations. But we all had this nebulous fear."

According to Giménez Cacho, an ambassador in the Turkish foreign service had contacted him and told him the Turkish government's position that the killings in the Armenian genocide were not a genocide; his statements were featured in Intent to Destroy.

The film producers deliberately made a final film cut that would be, according to the Motion Picture Association of America (MPAA) rating system, PG-13, so the audience could include teenagers and children; the producers did this by removing scenes that would otherwise give it an "R" rating. This meant not having extensive footage of violence. A scene in the film was inspired by the death of Alan Kurdi, who was fleeing the Middle East for Europe, to show parallels between Armenians fleeing the Armenian genocide to modern refugees like Alan Kurdi.

== Release ==
The film premiered at the 2016 Toronto International Film Festival on September 11, 2016. The initial three public viewings of the film were attended altogether by viewers numbering in the thousands. George stated that the final theatrical version is "essentially the same film" but with minor changes and slightly shortened.

In December 2016, Open Road Films acquired U.S. distribution rights to the film, and set an April 28, 2017, release date. Esrailian stated that there were difficulties finding a U.S. distributor due to Turkey historically taking action against companies making films about the Armenian genocide.

The release date was later changed to April 21, 2017. The final release date was meant to coincide on the same week with the day the Armenian genocide began, April 24. The film opened at 2,000 theaters. Zohrab Mnatsakanyan, at the time the Armenian government's representative to the United Nations, assisted with the New York City premiere.

The film also aired elsewhere outside of the United States before April 21, catering to the Armenian, Assyrian, and Greek diaspora. George stated that "Open Road certainly sees Armenians as its core audience to generate box office momentum." Another screening occurred at Vatican City. The production did not make plans to have a Turkish release.

== Reception ==
=== Box office ===
The Promise grossed $8.2 million in the United States and Canada and $4.2 in other territories for a total of $12.4 million, against a production budget of $90 million. Deadline Hollywood calculated the film lost the studio $102.1 million, when factoring together all expenses and revenues.

In the United States and Canada, The Promise opened alongside Unforgettable, Born in China, Free Fire and Phoenix Forgotten and was projected to gross around $5 million from 2,251 theaters in its opening weekend. It ended up debuting to $4.1 million, finishing 9th at the box office. Deadline Hollywood attributed the low opening to the lack of critical support and the film being released in the spring to coincide with the anniversary of the Armenian genocide, instead of in the fall during award season.

Open Road's president of marketing Jonathan Helfgot said the film's goal was not purely money related, saying: "[While] we certainly hoped for a better box office result ... It was about bringing the world's attention to this issue. And looking at the amount of conversation ... it's undeniable that there's been more focus and attention in the past two weeks than the past hundred years since the atrocity took place". The producers stated that they intended to give the profits to charitable organizations.

Frank Scheck of The Hollywood Reporter characterized the film as a "box-office disaster" that "sank like a stone ... attracting critical brickbats and going virtually unseen."

=== Critical response ===
On review aggregator Rotten Tomatoes, the film has an approval rating of 51% based on 161 reviews, with an average rating of 5.70/10. The site's critical consensus reads, "The Promise wastes an outstanding cast and powerful real-life story on a love triangle that frustratingly fails to engage." On Metacritic the film has a score of 49 out of 100, based on 30 critics, indicating "mixed or average reviews". Audiences polled by CinemaScore gave the film an average grade of "A−" on an A+ to F scale.

Benjamin Lee of The Guardian gave the film three out of five stars and called it an "often soapy but well-intentioned and extravagantly mounted epic". Richard Roeper of the Chicago Sun-Times gave the film 3 out of 4 stars, saying: "Yes, The Promise veers into corny territory, and yes, it's derivative of better war romances — but it's a solid and sobering reminder of the atrocities of war, bolstered by strong performances from Isaac and Bale, two of the best actors of their generation".

Sarafian praised the film for its historical accuracy. "The key themes were historically accurate," he said. "The producers did not take license to go beyond the historical material at hand yet they managed to capture much of the enormity of the Armenian genocide". Sarafian also commended director Terry George for his "well balanced and creditworthy" sense of history.

Harout Kassabian of The Armenian Weekly said the film will help the world recognize the trauma of the genocide as it has long been felt by Armenians: "The personal connection developed with the characters helps deepen the empathy felt by the audience".

Numerous celebrities reacted positively to the movie, including Armenian-American Kim Kardashian, as well as Reddit co-founder Alexis Ohanian.

Michael Daly of The Daily Beast contrasted the film with The Ottoman Lieutenant, a Turkish-backed film which he said expresses a distorted view of the Armenian genocide. Cara Buckley of The New York Times wrote that, due to similarities of some plot points, The Ottoman Lieutenant had "uncanny parallels" to The Promise.

Christopher H. Zakian, of the Orthodox Christian Studies Center of Fordham University, analyzed the ending of the film. Zakian stated that, since the ending does not show that Mikael had found a new lover, this suggests that he focused instead on raising Yeva, and therefore held true to the Armenian ideal of sacrificing one's own desires in favor of the well-being of children, the next generation. Furthermore, Zakian wrote that Ana's actions in saving children reflects an idea in Matthew 18:6: "It would be better to have a great millstone fastened round the neck and be drowned in the depths of the sea" than to cause harm to a child.

=== IMDb pre-release voting controversy ===
By the end of October 2016, before its official release and after only three pre-release screenings in September 2016 at the Toronto International Film Festival to small audiences, IMDb had registered over 86,000 ratings for the film, 55,126 of which were one-star and 30,639 of which were 10-star, with very few ratings falling anywhere in between. The majority of these votes had been cast by males outside of the U.S. By mid-November the total was over 91,000 votes, with over 57,000 one-star votes. Commentators assessed that these were mostly votes by people who could not possibly have seen the film, and that the one-star voting was part of an orchestrated campaign by Armenian genocide deniers to downrate the film, which had then initiated an Armenian response to rate the film highly. Grassroots attempts to fight against false ratings have gone viral, including a video by Harvard student Michael He that has received 300,000 views. At the time of its American release, the film had an IMDb rating of 5.5/10 from 129,241 votes, and as of May 24, 2019 holds an IMDb rating of 6.1/10 based on 164,475 votes.

=== Accolades ===
In 2017 George received the Armin T. Wegner Humanitarian Award in honor of his films depicting genocides, including The Promise. In addition, he received a khachkar, made by Hrach Gukasyan and commissioned by the Arpa International Film Festival and Awards Gala, with Armenian-style patterns in the shape of a Celtic cross, the latter in honor of his Irish heritage.

| Year | Awards | Category | Recipient(s) | Result |
|---|---|---|---|---|
| 2017 | Hollywood Music in Media Awards | Best Original Song in a Feature Film | "The Promise" (performed by Chris Cornell) | Nominated |
| 2018 | Grammy Awards | Best Rock Performance | "The Promise" (performed by Chris Cornell) | Nominated |
| 2018 | Satellite Awards | Best Original Song | "The Promise" (performed by Chris Cornell) | Nominated |
| 2018 | Movieguide Awards | Best Movie for Mature Audiences | The Promise | Nominated |
| 2018 | Movieguide Awards | Most Inspiring Movie of 2017 | The Promise | Nominated |
| 2018 | Movieguide Awards | Faith & Freedom Award for Movies | The Promise | Nominated |
| 2018 | Movieguide Awards | Most Inspiring Performance for Movies | Oscar Isaac | Nominated |
