= Scream (Chris Cornell album) =

Studio album by Chris Cornell
- Released: March 10, 2009
- Recorded: 2008
- Studio: Hit Factory Criteria (Miami); The Studio at the Setai (Miami Beach)
- Genre: Pop rock; dance-pop; electropop
- Length: 63:14
- Label: Mosley; Suretone
- Producer: Timbaland (exec.); Jerome "J-Roc" Harmon; Jim Beanz; Justin Timberlake; Ryan Tedder

Chris Cornell chronology
Carry On (2007)	Scream (2009)	Part of Me Remix EP (2009)

Singles from Scream
- 1. "Long Gone" Released: July 29, 2008; 2. "Watch Out" Released: August 5, 2008; 3. "Ground Zero" Released: September 9, 2008; 4. "Scream" Released: September 22, 2008; 5. "Part of Me" Released: October 12, 2008

Scream is the third solo studio album by American musician Chris Cornell. Released on March 10, 2009, through Suretone Records and Mosley Music Group, it marked a shift from Cornell's previous musical efforts. Guitar and rock elements were largely excluded, replaced with producer Timbaland's electronic pop soundscapes. The album was promoted with the release of five digital singles and three music videos, and was met with mostly negative reviews. The album debuted in the U.S. at number 10 on the Billboard 200 with 26,000 copies sold.

== Production ==
=== Recording history ===
With the idea of remixing songs from his previous album Carry On (2007), Cornell first came into contact with Timbaland. However, the collaboration evolved into the duo writing and recording an entire album in just six weeks, notably with the conceptual direction of "tying it all together musically", which Cornell describes as "[harkening] back to albums that I listened to when I was a kid, where the music never stops" and that it "begs to be listened to on headphones all the way through".

=== Musical style ===
Billboard reported that Scream shows Cornell moving "in a much more pop-oriented direction, with busy drum machine beats, buffed-up chorus vocals and string samples filling the nooks and crannies", comparing it to Gnarls Barkley and less that of "the guitar-driven music of Cornell's past with Soundgarden and Audioslave". Despite the controversy caused by teaming up with Timbaland, Cornell insisted that he still played an integral part of the album's creation and didn't do what "Timbaland told me to do," further noting that they "didn't really have that relationship" and "it wasn't that type of a process. It was more, he would bring in a beat, an idea, I would write to it and sing it, and we would move on kind of to the next thing."

Describing the album as a whole, Cornell compared it to Pink Floyd's The Dark Side of the Moon and Queen's A Night at the Opera, citing the psychedelic elements that Timbaland brought into the production.

== Reception ==
Professional ratings
Aggregate scores
Source	Rating
Metacritic	42/100
Review scores
Source	Rating
AllMusic	2.5/5 stars
The A.V. Club	C−
Entertainment Weekly	B+
Los Angeles Times	1/4 stars
Mojo	3/5 stars
musicOMH	3.5/5 stars
NME	4/10
PopMatters	3/10
Rolling Stone	2/5 stars
Spin	2.5/5 stars

In the U.S., the album debuted at number 10 on the Billboard 200 and thus became Cornell's first top 10 solo album. The next week it dropped 55 places to number 65, which was the largest second-week drop for a top 10-debuting album in two and a half years. It spent 10 weeks on the Billboard 200.

Initial critical response towards the release was mixed to negative. At Metacritic, which assigns a normalized rating out of 100 to reviews from mainstream critics, the album has received an average score of 42, based on 19 reviews. Scream received positive reviews from Entertainment Weekly and Hot Press who felt that the collaboration between producer Timbaland and Chris Cornell worked. The mixed reviews were more prevalent, with Spin stating the album was "strangely appealing in its elaborately empty efficiency", while Billboard noted that "sometimes it's good bizarre. Other times it's bad bizarre." Rolling Stone wrote that Scream "veers between drab–sleek and rock–dude soulful; Cornell's yowl never sounds at home". Among the negative reviews, Allmusic wrote that "Scream is one of those rare big-budget disasters, an exercise in misguided ambition that makes no sense outside of pure theory."

Nine Inch Nails creator Trent Reznor attacked the album, suggesting on Twitter that Cornell had "embarrass(ed)" himself. Reznor regretted his comments, writing an apology email to Cornell when both Nine Inch Nails and Soundgarden announced a co-headlining tour.

After Cornell's death, Timbaland said that Cornell was “One of the best I've worked with“ and singled out Scream as “One of my favorite albums I was honored to work on.“ He later added: “It was an honor creating this Classic with Chris Cornell“

== Track listing ==
Songwriter credits adapted from the liner notes of the album. Songwriters for the bonus tracks can be found in the ASCAP database.

No.	Title	Writer(s)	Additional production	Length
1.	"Part of Me"	Chris Cornell; Jerome Harmon; Timothy Mosley; Ezekiel Lewis; Balewa Muhammad	Backing vocals: Ezekiel Lewis and Jim Beanz	5:14
2.	"Time"	Cornell; Harmon; Mosley; James Washington; Lewis; Muhammad	Backing vocals: Ezekiel Lewis and Jim Beanz; Co-produced with Jim Beanz	4:39
3.	"Sweet Revenge"	Cornell; Harmon; Mosley; Washington	Backing vocals: Jim Beanz	4:10
4.	"Get Up"	Cornell; Harmon; Mosley	Backing vocals: Jim Beanz	3:35
5.	"Ground Zero"	Cornell; Harmon; Mosley; Washington	Backing vocals: Jim Beanz; Co-produced with Jim Beanz	3:09
6.	"Never Far Away"	Cornell; Harmon; Mosley; Lewis; Muhammad	Backing vocals: Ryan Tedder	5:06
7.	"Take Me Alive"	Cornell; Harmon; Mosley; Washington; Justin Timberlake	Backing vocals: Justin Timberlake and Jim Beanz	4:36
8.	"Long Gone"	Cornell; Harmon; Mosley; Lewis; Muhammad; Patrick "J. Que" Smith	Backing vocals: Ezekiel Lewis	5:15
9.	"Scream"	Cornell; Harmon; Mosley; Washington	Additional vocals: Timothy Mosley	6:14
10.	"Enemy"	Cornell; Harmon; Mosley; Lewis; Muhammad; Ryan Tedder; King Logan	Backing vocals: Jim Beanz	4:35
11.	"Other Side of Town"	Cornell; Harmon; Mosley; Washington	Backing vocals: Jim Beanz	4:48
12.	"Climbing Up the Walls"	Cornell; Harmon; Mosley; Washington	Backing vocals: Jim Beanz	4:48
13.	"Watch Out"	Cornell; Harmon; Mosley; Washington	Backing vocals: Jim Beanz; Co-produced with Jim Beanz	4:02
14.	"Two Drink Minimum" (hidden track)	Cornell; Harmon; Mosley		3:03

=== Bonus tracks ===
No.	Title	Writer(s)	Additional production	Length
15.	"Ordinary Girl" (Availability: iTunes US and UK)	Cornell; Harmon; Mosley	Co-produced with Ryan Tedder	4:33
16.	"Lost Cause" (Availability: iTunes UK, Barnes & Noble)	Cornell; Harmon; Mosley; Washington		4:20
17.	"Do Me Wrong" (Availability: Amazon.com and Japanese editions.)	Cornell; Harmon; Mosley	Co-produced with Ryan Tedder	2:54
18.	"Stop Me" (Availability: Verizon Wireless – Blackberry Storm exclusive, Rhapsody digital-download service)	Harmon; Mosely; James Fauntleroy	Co-produced with Ryan Tedder; Backing vocals: James Fauntleroy	3:34

== Personnel ==
Musicians

- Chris Cornell – lead vocals
- Timbaland – all instruments
- Jerome Harmon – all instruments
- DJ Timmy T – DJ scratching
- Demo Castellon – additional programming
- Dan Warner – all additional guitars
- Lee Levin – additional live drums (6, 8)
- Darryl Pearson – additional live bass (1, 13), additional live bass, guitars and background vocals (8)
- Justin Timberlake – additional background vocals (7)
- Amar – additional background vocals (7)
- Ryan Tedder – additional background vocals (6)
- Jim Beanz – additional background vocals (2, 3, 4, 5, 7, 10, 11, 12, 13)
- Ezekiel Lewis – additional background vocals (1, 2, 8)
- Brent Kutzle – additional cello (10)
- Peter Thorn – additional guitars (10, 12)
- Jason Sutter – additional live drums (12)
- Lasim Richards – horns (1)
- Frank Chadwyck Bernstein – horns (1)
- Brian Keegan – horns (1)
- Rashawn Ross – horns (1)
- Phil Lassiter – horns (1)

Production

- Timbaland – production (all songs), executive producer
- Jerome Harmon – production (all songs)
- Demo Castellon – mixing, recording, co-executive producer, mixing (5, 10, 12)
- Julian Vazquez Jr. – recording, mixing (10)
- Jim Beanz – vocal production
- Chris Gehringer – mastering
- Chris Godbey – Pro Tools editing, additional recording, mixing (5)
- Ron Taylor – Pro Tools editing, additional recording
- Chris Carroll – additional recording
- Fareed Salamah – additional recording, mixing (12), 2nd mix assistant
- King Logan – co-production (10)
- Peter Thorn – additional guitar recording (10, 12)
- Tom Weir – additional live drums recording (12)
- Scott Eric Olivier – additional live drums recording (12)
- Brandon Jones – assistant engineer
- Alex Graupera – assistant engineer
- Miguel Bustamante – assistant engineer
- Chad Jolly – assistant engineer
- Rick Bryant – assistant engineer
- Sebastian de Peyrecave – assistant engineer
- Marc VanGool – guitar technician

== Rock versions ==
There are currently two Scream tracks that have had "rock versions" of them released. The first being an alternate version of "Long Gone", produced by Howard Benson, which was accompanied by an official music video directed by DJ Skee's Skee.tv.

The second track to come to light was a "rock version" of "Never Far Away". This version was not a remix, but a completely new recording, produced by Jordon Zadorozny. It has yet to be released for purchase, but has been, with permission from Cornell himself, made available for streaming by Alan Cross. In October 2009, it was reported that Cornell was working with Jordon Zadorozny and Michael Friedman to rework the entire Scream album but then Chris rejoined Soundgarden. No further development on the project had been made between Cornell rejoining Soundgarden and his death on May 18, 2017.

No.	Title	Writer(s)	Release format	Length
1.	"Long Gone" (rock version)	Chris Cornell; Howard Benson	Released via the Long Gone (rock version) digital-only single	3:41
2.	"Never Far Away" (rock version)	Cornell; Jordon Zadorozny	Only available for streaming	3:59

== Charts ==
Weekly chart performance for Scream
Chart (2009)	Peak position
Austrian Albums (Ö3 Austria)	75
Canadian Albums (Billboard)	13
Danish Albums (Hitlisten)	30
Dutch Albums (Album Top 100)	61
Finnish Albums (Suomen virallinen lista)	18
German Albums (Offizielle Top 100)	46
Italian Albums (FIMI)	66
Polish Albums (ZPAV)	32
Swiss Albums (Schweizer Hitparade)	28
UK Albums (OCC)	70
US Billboard 200	10
