= Nearly Forgot My Broken Heart =

Single by Chris Cornell

from the album Higher Truth
- Released: August 12, 2015
- Genre: Alternative rock
- Length: 3:54
- Label: Universal Music Group
- Songwriter: Chris Cornell
- Producer: Brendan O'Brien

Chris Cornell singles chronology
"Heavy Is the Head" (2015)	"Nearly Forgot My Broken Heart" (2015)	"Nothing Compares 2 U" (2016)

Music video
- "Nearly Forgot My Broken Heart" on Vimeo

"Nearly Forgot My Broken Heart" is a song by American rock musician Chris Cornell. It was released as the lead single from his fourth studio album Higher Truth (2015). The song hit the top 5 on Billboard's Mainstream Rock chart, and is also his first entry on that chart since 2007's "No Such Thing", as well as his first entry on the Alternative Songs chart since 1999's "Can't Change Me" and his first song to enter the Adult Alternative Songs chart.

== Origin and lyrics ==
In an interview with Yahoo! in 2015, Cornell talked about the inspiration behind the song:

I was on tour with Soundgarden, and I remember writing down the title. The title immediately brought up the idea of the song, which is that someone is so distracted by a new person or a new thing in their life that they kind of forgot that they had given up on life. Sometimes it just happens without us even noticing.

== Music video ==
A music video directed by Jessie Hill was released on September 11, 2015. Cornell and Eric Roberts play prisoners about to be hanged; as an onlooker (Elena Satine) distracts the hangman, Cornell's noose is sabotaged by the executioner's assistant so he survives his hanging, and is forced into marriage with the woman who sabotaged his hanging. The video ends with the other prisoner about to be hanged and the onlooker about to play her part again. Cornell's 10-year-old son, Christopher, also appears in the video.

Cornell insisted on doing his own stunts and had an accident on set. The shooting of the mock hanging didn't go as planned and they were forced to do it several times. The liquid chemical singeing a noose tied around Cornell's neck rubbed off on his neck, leaving him with second degree burns on his shoulder.

Three weeks after Chris Cornell's suicide by hanging on May 18, 2017, the music video was removed from YouTube.

== Charts ==
=== Weekly charts ===
Chart (2015)	Peak position
Canada Rock (Billboard)	1
US Hot Rock & Alternative Songs (Billboard)	18
US Rock & Alternative Airplay (Billboard)	7

=== Year-end charts ===
Chart (2015)	Position
US Rock Airplay (Billboard)	50

Chart (2016)	Position
US Hot Rock Songs (Billboard)	93
US Rock Airplay (Billboard)	40

== Certifications ==
Certifications for "Nearly Forgot My Broken Heart"
Region	Certification	Certified units/sales
New Zealand (RMNZ)	Gold	15,000^{‡}
^{‡} Sales+streaming figures based on certification alone.
