= Gabin (Italian band) =

Gabin (French: [ɡabɛ̃]) is an Italian pop band consisting of Massimo Bottini and Filippo Clary. Their name is a reference to the most popular French actor of the 1930s and 1940s – Jean Gabin.

== Releases ==
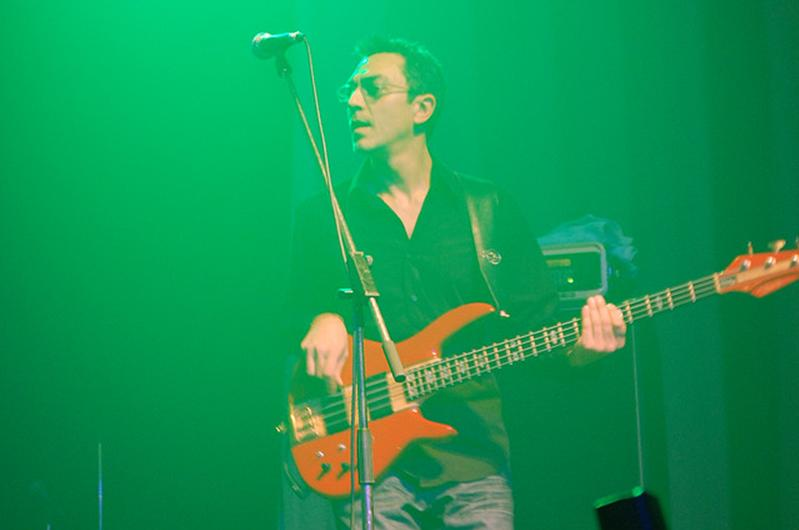
Massimo Bottini, one half of Gabin

Gabin have collaborated with numerous jazz artists such as Dee Dee Bridgewater, Edwyn Collins and China Moses. Their first album, Gabin (2002), includes the singles "Doo Uap, Doo Uap, Doo Uap", "Sweet Sadness" and "La Maison". Their song "Bang Bang To The Rock'N'Roll" from Mr. Freedom (2004) was used in the 2005 film Fantastic Four and in the 2008 film Sex Drive. They had a top ten hit in their home country and success around the globe, encompassing over 35 countries from the U.S. to New Zealand, Argentina and Russia. In 2004, Gabin next released a blues and blue note-influenced uptempo album entitled Mr. Freedom, which includes the title track "Mr. Freedom".

== Guest artists ==
Guest vocalists on Mr. Freedom include the two-time Grammy and Tony Award winning vocalist Dee Dee Bridgewater, the former Orange Juice vocalist Edwyn Collins and even Bridgewater's daughter, China Moses. This specially sequenced US version has the Italian Latin-dance maestro Nicola Conte. Conte caps the album with an extended live sextet version of "Into My Soul". Their 2010 album, Third and double, features guest vocals from the Soundgarden frontman Chris Cornell for the song "Lies".

== Other media ==
Gabin's music appears on the compilation CD Hotel Costes. It has been used in television shows like Sex And The City and Six Feet Under, in TV commercials for Polaroid and Cinemax, and in the video game FIFA World Cup: Germany 2006. The band remixed Peggy Lee's "Fever" for the Pink Panther's Penthouse Party CD.

== Discography ==
The cover of The First Ten Years is a collage of references to earlier albums and songs.

- Gabin (2002)
- Mr. Freedom (2004, EMI)
- The Best of Gabin (2008)
- Third and Double (2010)
- The First Ten Years (2012)
- TAD Replay (2012)
- Soundtrack System (2014)
