= Van Norman =

Van Norman may refer to:

In people

- Amelie Veiller Van Norman (1844-1920), French-born American educator
- Daniel C. Van Norman (1815-1886), Canadian-born American educator, clergyman, and school founder
- Donald Van Norman Roberts (1927-2016), American engineer
- Harry C. Van Norman (1874-1929), U.S. politician
- Moriah van Norman (born 1984), American water polo player
- Tom Van Norman, American politician

In geography

- Van Norman Lake (Michigan), lake in the U.S. state of Michigan

Other

- Van Norman Dams, terminus of the Los Angeles Aqueduct
- Van Norman Institute, American girls' school in New York City.
- Van Norman Machine Tool Company, American machine tool builder
