= Candor, New York =

Candor
- Town
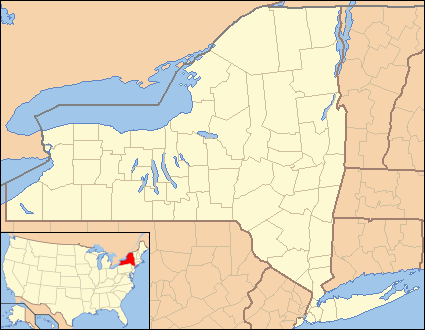
- Location of Candor in New York
- Coordinates: 42°13′42″N 76°20′12″W
- Country: United States
- State: New York
- County: Tioga

Area
  - Total: 94.62 sq mi (245.06 km^{2})
  - Land: 94.51 sq mi (244.78 km^{2})
  - Water: 0.11 sq mi (0.28 km^{2})

Population (2020)
  - Total: 5,172 ▼
  - Estimate (2021): 5,092
  - Density: 53.4/sq mi (20.61/km^{2})
- Time zone: UTC-5 (Eastern (EST))
  - Summer (DST): UTC-4 (EDT)
- FIPS code: 36-107-12221
- Website: https://townofcandorny.gov/

Candor is a town in Tioga County, New York, United States. The population was 5,172 at the 2020 census.

The Town of Candor has a village named Candor. The town is south of Ithaca.

== History ==
Settlement of the town began around 1794 on land purchased as part of the Watkins and Flint Patent of 1794.

The Town of Candor was formed from the Town of Spencer in 1811. Citizens wanted to name the town "Washington," but did not do so due to the existence of another town by that name in New York (Dutchess County). The source of the name "Candor" is unknown.

Candor was the community identified as "Springdale" in Vidich and Bensman's 1958 book, Small Town in Mass Society, which caused controversy for how it portrayed the politics of the Candor community and for how it failed to sufficiently anonymize residents.

== Geography ==
According to the United States Census Bureau, the town has a total area of 94.6 square miles (245.0 km^{2}), of which 94.5 square miles (244.8 km^{2}) is land and 0.1 square mile (0.2 km^{2}) (0.06%) is water.

New York State Route 96 intersects New York State Route 96B in Candor village.

The West Branch of Owego Creek defines the eastern town line.

== Demographics ==
Historical population
Census	Pop.	Note	%±
1820	1,655		—
1830	2,653		60.3%
1840	3,370		27.0%
1850	3,433		1.9%
1860	3,840		11.9%
1870	4,250		10.7%
1880	4,323		1.7%
1890	3,674		−15.0%
1900	3,330		−9.4%
1910	2,911		−12.6%
1920	2,639		−9.3%
1930	2,564		−2.8%
1940	2,601		1.4%
1950	2,879		10.7%
1960	3,488		21.2%
1970	4,190		20.1%
1980	4,919		17.4%
1990	5,310		7.9%
2000	5,314		0.1%
2010	5,305		−0.2%
2020	5,172		−2.5%
2021 (est.)	5,092	▼	−1.5%
U.S. Decennial Census

As of the census of 2000, there were 5,317 people, 2,022 households, and 1,457 families residing in the town. The population density was 56.2 inhabitants per square mile (21.7/km^{2}). There were 2,234 housing units at an average density of 23.6 per square mile (9.1/km^{2}). The racial makeup of the town was 97.25% White, 0.85% Black or African American, 0.26% Native American, 0.19% Asian, 0.08% from other races, and 1.37% from two or more races. Hispanic or Latino of any race were 0.98% of the population.

There were 2,022 households, out of which 36.0% had children under the age of 18 living with them, 56.6% were married couples living together, 10.2% had a female householder with no husband present, and 27.9% were non-families. 22.4% of all households were made up of individuals, and 9.8% had someone living alone who was 65 years of age or older. The average household size was 2.63 and the average family size was 3.08.

In the town, the population was spread out, with 28.1% under the age of 18, 7.2% from 18 to 24, 30.3% from 25 to 44, 22.5% from 45 to 64, and 11.9% who were 65 years of age or older. The median age was 36 years. For every 100 females, there were 96.3 males. For every 100 females age 18 and over, there were 94.1 males.

The median income for a household in the town was $37,633, and the median income for a family was $43,186. Males had a median income of $30,441 versus $22,324 for females. The per capita income for the town was $16,967. About 6.6% of families and 9.8% of the population were below the poverty line, including 12.3% of those under age 18 and 3.1% of those age 65 or over.

== Education ==
Candor is served by the Candor Central School District.

== Communities and locations in the Town of Candor ==
- Candor – The village of Candor is in the center of the town.
- Catatonk – A hamlet near the southern town line on NY-96.
- Catatonk Creek – A stream that flows southward through the town toward the Susquehanna River.
- Fairfield – A hamlet east of Candor village near the eastern town boundary.
- Gridleyville – A location northwest of Candor village on NY-96B.
- Hubbardtown – A location south of Candor village on NY-96.
- Perryville – A former location in the town, north of Candor village.
- Upper Fairfield – A hamlet north of Fairfield. It was also called "Blinn's Settlement," "Honey Pot," and "East Candor."
- Weltonville – A hamlet in the southeastern corner of the town on County Road 33.
- West Candor – A location at the western town line on NY-96, partly in the Town of Spencer.
- Willseyville – A hamlet in the northeastern part of the town on NY-96B. It was formerly called "Big Flatt."

== Notable people ==
- Rebecca S. Halstead, brigadier general, born in Willseyville
- Sarah Warren Keeler (1844-1899), educator of deaf-mutes, born in Candor
- Jay Lynch, American cartoonist, writer for Bazooka Joe comics
- Moondog, Composer
- Rodney S. Rose, Methodist minister
- Heather Stapleton, American environmental organic chemist and exposure scientist
- Bayonne Whipple, actress, buried in Candor
- Garrett Zacharias, racing driver

== In popular culture ==
- Harry Chapin's 1976 song, The Mayor of Candor Lied, references the Village of Candor.
