= Love Notes =

Love Notes may refer to:

- Notes of Love, a 1998 Italian-French romance film, also known as Love Notes
- Love Notes (Ramsey Lewis album), a 1977 jazz album by Ramsey Lewis
- Love Notes (Janie Fricke album), a 1979 country album by Janie Fricke
