= Katherine Marlowe (actress) =

American actress (1914–2010)

- Publicity Photo of Katherine Marlowe
- Born: Kathryn Irene Rea; May 25, 1914; Corydon, Iowa, U.S.
- Died: January 2, 2010 (aged 95); Tampa, Florida, U.S.
- Other names: Kea Rea; Kathryn Marlowe
- Education: Drake University
- Occupations: Actress, singer
- Spouse: Les Clark (m. 1937; div. 1940)

Katherine Marlowe (born Kathryn Irene Rea; May 25, 1914 – January 2, 2010) was an American singer and film actress in the 1930s, most notably in Dodsworth, which starred Walter Huston, Mary Astor and Ruth Chatterton. Other films included Bridal Grief, Artists and Models and China Passage. She was also known as Kea Rea. Her film name was also seen as Kathryn Marlowe, which was "assigned to her after she lost a battle to retain her own" name.

== Early years ==
Marlowe was born in Corydon, Iowa. Her parents were Mr. and Mrs. Fred Rea. During part of her childhood she lived with her grandparents in Benton Harbor, Michigan. She attended Stephens College, where she studied piano, and graduated from Drake University in 1935. While she was at Stephens she sang in weekly sessions with Red Johnson's orchestra; after finishing at Drake, her victory in a contest gained her a contract with Glen Lee's orchestra in Chicago. At Drake she studied dramatics and music and was active in concert tours, operettas, and plays.

== Career ==
Marlowe sang with Lee and his orchestra at the Morrison Hotel in Chicago inthe summer of 1935. The performances were broadcast. In the spring of 1936 she sang with Dick Messner's orchestra at the Park Central Hotel in New York City. She left her position with Messner that year to sign a contract with United Artists film company.

Marlowe's career was interrupted in 1943 when a dog bit her, causing injuries that she said would mean being unable to work in films for at least six months. She sued the dog's owner for $31,425 in damages. In 1956, Marlowe starred in an episode of the Highway Patrol (S2, E3), as the wife to her accomplice husband who was a robber who committed murder in "Trailer Story".

== Other activities ==
Marlowe owned a 50-acre farm near Monroe, Iowa, on which she raised corn and pedigreed animals. Her activities there resulted in prizes at county fairs.

== Personal life and death ==
Marlowe married actor Les Clark in 1937; they were divorced on January 20, 1940. She died at the age of 95 in Tampa, Florida, after a long period of ill health.
