= Rodney S. Rose =

Methodist clergyman (1819–1900)

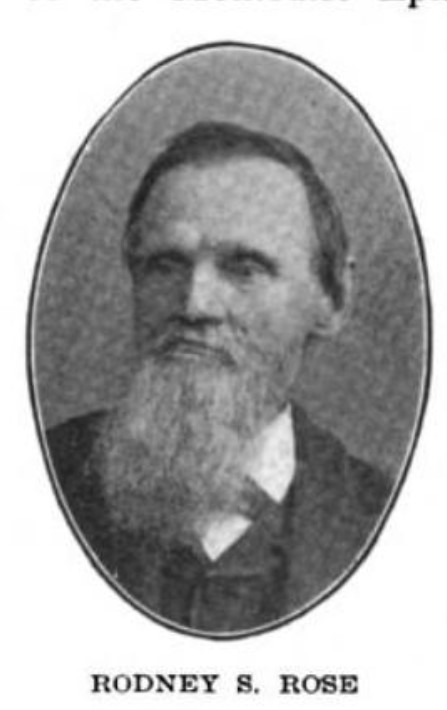

Rodney S. Rose (1819-1900) was a prominent Methodist clergyman from New York state who was the father of actress Bayonne Whipple and father-in-law of Walter Huston, founder of the Huston acting family.

Rodney S. Rose was born on February 6, 1819, in Exeter, New York to Jehiel Rose and Lavinia Sanford Rose. Rodney Rose became a Methodist as a youth, and upon deciding to become a pastor, he was educated at Cortland, New York and Cazenovia Seminary, and became a member of the Oneida, New York Conference in 1841. After his ordination in 1841, he served as pastor of many Methodist congregations, including: Bainbridge, New Berlin, Chenango, Windsor, Great Bend, Vestal, Broome, Sanford, Mount Pleasant, Salem, Shepherd's Creek, Berkshire, Van Ettenville, Caroline, Flemingville, Lackawanna, Newton, Springville, Orwell.

He married Esther Thurston in 1844 and had six children (Samuel, Ella, Anna, Charles, John and Arthur) with her before her death in 1859. In 1860 he married Mary Kinney, but she died five months later of heart disease. In 1862 he married Mary Louisa Ward of Candor, New York and they had four children (Lewis, Olin, Mary, and Fanny (known as Bayonne Whipple)). In 1876 he largely retired to Candor, New York where he died and was buried in 1900.
