= Margaret Dye Ellis =

American temperance leader, lobbyist (1845–1925)

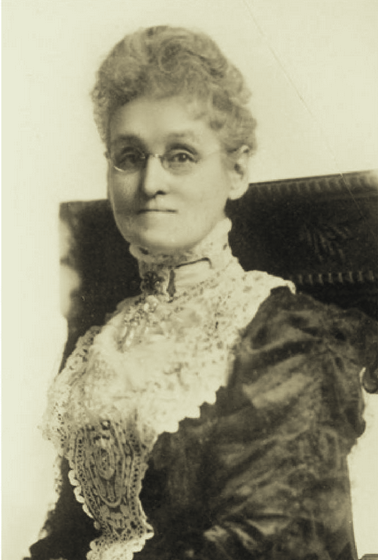
- Born: Margaret B. Dye; September 30, 1845; New York City, New York, U.S.
- Died: July 13, 1925 (aged 79); Newark, New Jersey, U.S.
- Occupations: Social reformer; lobbyist; correspondent
- Years active: 1873–1918
- Organization: Woman's Christian Temperance Union
- Known for: Temperance movement; suffrage movement; social purity movement
- Notable work: "Our Washington Letter" in The Union Signal
- Spouse: Jonathan T. Ellis (m. 1865–1907)
- Children: 4

Margaret Dye Ellis (née Dye; September 30, 1845 – July 13, 1925) was an American social reformer, lobbyist, and correspondent active in the temperance movement. She served as Superintendent, Legislation, for the National Woman's Christian Temperance Union (W.C.T.U.). in Washington, D.C. for 17 years, looking after reform measures in Congress. Throughout those years, she contributed to the W.C.T.U.'s organ, The Union Signal, a weekly, "Our Washington Letter". She favored woman suffrage and was a social purity activist. Ellis, aided by local and State unions, helped greatly in securing the passage of many reform laws.

== Early life and education ==
Margaret B. Dye was born in New York City, September 30, 1845. Her parents were Clarkson Dye (1909-1865) and Margaret (McLean) Dye (1816-1867). Her parents, who were members of the American Anti-Slavery Society, were also associated with benevolent and philanthropic endeavors. Margaret had three older siblings, Lavinus, William and Elizabeth, as well as three younger siblings, Eliza, Mortimer, and Garrett.

She was educated in the public schools of New York City and at the Van Norman Institute for Young Ladies (New York).

== Career ==
It was in 1873 in Alameda, California that news of the temperance cause reached Ellis. Her home responsibilities kept her busy, her husband and children claiming all her attention. Aroused by the Women's Crusade news from Ohio, the Alameda women of all denominations came together and united in a movement to bring about better conditions in that state.

Returning to New Jersey in 1876, she identified herself with the W.C.T.U. of that state. She was appointed State Corresponding Secretary of the W.C.T.U. in 1880, filling that position until 1895. At Mt. Tabor, where Ellis made her first public lecture on the temperance question in 1887, she was a familiar figure among the summer residents, as she was also in Asbury Park, having made many addresses at both places, especially during her years of service as New Jersey state secretary of the W.C.T.U.

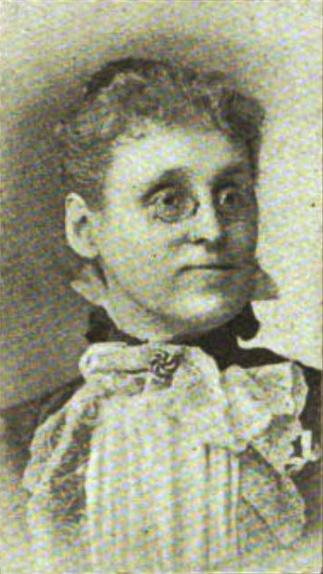
1900

Frances Willard requested of Ellis that she undertake the legislative work in Washington, D.C.. When Ellis replied, "I am unequal to the task", Willard exclaimed, "Margaret, I will not listen to any refusal". Ellis arrived in Washington, D.C., in 1895, having been elected National W.C.T.U. superintendent of Legislation and appointed National W.C.T.U. Legislative representative. She retained that position for over twenty years. From the time of her first enlistment in the cause, and especially during her residence in New Jersey and Washington, Ellis did much service on the platform, taking part in numerous campaigns, assisting in the evangelistic movements of the W.C.T.U., and specializing on the legal features of the situation in each particular State. While serving as Legislative Superintendent, she attended the sessions of Congress and numerous committee meetings of the House of Representatives and Senate, where reform measures were under consideration, presenting petitions or filing remonstrances in connection with matters vital to the home and to the well-being of society.

Ellis did much platform work, also, having spoken at Chautauquas and conventions in nearly every state in the union. She wrote a weekly "Our Washington Letter" for the W.C.T.U.'s official organ, The Union Signal. She was a member of the Daughters of the American Revolution (D.A.R.), Woman's Welfare Department of the Civic League, Consumers' League, and the Woman's Suffrage League.

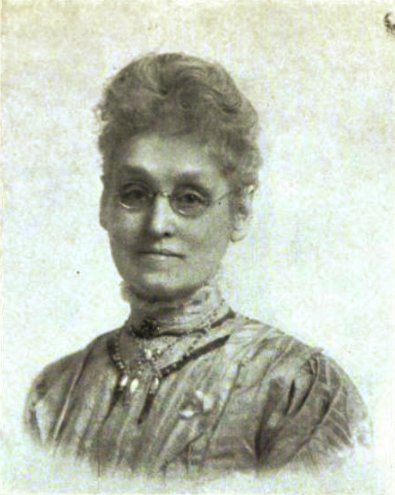
(undated)

In 1910, Ellis was a delegate to the World's W.C.T.U. convention in Glasgow, Scotland. In the following year, she was appointed by President William Howard Taft as one of the two women delegates to the Thirteenth International Congress on Alcoholism held at The Hague, Holland, September 1911, an official certificate from the department of state making her a representative of this government.

At the National W.C.T.U. convention held in 1918, Ellis made her 23, and final annual report. That year, she was succeeded by Lenna Lowe Yost, of West Virginia. Ellis' retirement was precipitated by failing health; thereafter, she became an emeritus member of the W.C.T.U.

== Personal life ==
In 1865, she married Jonathan T. Ellis (1834-1907), a merchant of New York, (Note: According to Leonard (1914), the marriage occurred in 1863.) but a native of Maine. They had four children.

After a long illness, she died in Newark, New Jersey, July 13, 1925.

== Selected works ==
- The canteen : a summary of facts, 190? (Text)
- Constitution for the proposed state of New Mexico : statements of Hon. William J. Mills, governor of New Mexico, Hon. Henry W. Blair, Washington, D.C., Mrs. Margaret Dye Ellis, Washington, D.C., Hon. S.E. Nicholson, Washington, D.C. : February 17 and 19, 1911 by United States, 1911
