= Tequila Mockingbird =

- designed by John Berg

Studio album by Ramsey Lewis
- Released: 1977
- Studios: Burbank Studios, Burbank, CA Sunset Sound Recorders, Hollywood, CA Wally Heider Studios, Hollywood, CA
- Genre: Jazz
- Length: 38:45
- Label: Columbia
- Producers: Bert DeCouteaux, Larry Dunn

Ramsey Lewis chronology
Love Notes (1977)	Tequila Mockingbird (1977)	Legacy (1978)

Singles from Tequila Mockingbird
- 1. "Skippin" Released: November, 1977; 2. "Tequila Mockingbird" Released: February, 1978

Professional ratings
Review scores
Source	Rating
AllMusic	2/5 stars
Cashbox	(favourable)
The Rolling Stone Album Guide	3/5 stars
Variety	(favourable)

Tequila Mockingbird is an album by the American jazz pianist Ramsey Lewis, released in 1977 on Columbia Records. The album peaked at No. 3 on the US Billboard Top Jazz Albums chart, as well as becoming one of the top-selling record albums in Mexico City.

"Skippin" was issued as the first single in November 1977. The title track, composed by Larry Dunn, was issued as the second single in February 1978.

== Overview ==
Tequila Mockingbird was produced by both Larry Dunn of Earth, Wind & Fire and Bert DeCouteaux. Artists such as Ronnie Laws, Eddie Del Barrio and Ernie Watts featured on the album. As well EW&F's Philip Bailey, Verdine White, Al McKay, Fred White and Johnny Graham made guest appearances.

"Skippin'" was later covered by both Victor Feldman and The Bill Watrous Combo feat. Danny Stiles.

The album cover was designed by Columbia Records art director John Berg, who also came up with the album title Tequila Mockingbird.

In May 2019, The Roots performed "Tequila Mockingbird" as Jeff Daniels walked to his guest seat on The Tonight Show Starring Jimmy Fallon, as a nod to his role as Atticus Finch in the Broadway production of To Kill a Mockingbird.

== Critical reception ==
Robin Welles for the Lake Geneva Regional News praised the album saying the “melody and improvisation blend with jewel-like precision”.

Emmett Weaver of the Birmingham Post-Herald noted "really solid percussion with a semi-Latin influence."

Cashbox described the album as having "a strong beat, fluid melodies and a richly orchestrated sound," calling Lewis’ keyboard work "clear, unhurried and affecting" and noting the title track as a "funky jump."

In a review published by The Lethbridge Herald, the album was described as featuring “new audio electronics combined with vibraphone and other familiar instruments”, resulting in “an easy listening amalgam of jazz that holds onto the Lewis tradition while remaining fresh.”

== Track listing ==
No.	Title	Writer(s)	Length
1.	"Tequila Mockingbird"	Larry Dunn	5:22
2.	"Wandering Rose"	Neal Creque	5:41
3.	"Skippin'"	Victor Feldman	3:08
4.	"My Angel's Smile"	Maure Stewart	5:18
5.	"Camino El Bueno"		3:53
6.	"Caring For You"		5:31
7.	"Intimacy"		6:00
8.	"That Ole Bach Magic"	Eddie del Barrio, Larry Dunn	3:12

== Personnel ==
=== Musicians ===
- Ramsey Lewis - piano (all tracks), harpsichord (all tracks), Fender Rhodes (all tracks), Mini-Moog (all tracks), rhythm tracks (2, 4–7)
- Larry Dunn - keyboards and synthesizer programming (1, 8)
- Verdine White - bass (1, 3, 8)
- Leon Ndugu Chancler - drums and timbales (1, 8)
- Philip Bailey - percussion (1), congas (3, 8)
- Al McKay - guitar (1, 3, 8)
- Ronnie Laws - soprano saxophone (1)
- Eddie del Barrio - horn arrangements (1, 3, 8), horn conductor (1, 3, 8), electric piano (8)
- George del Barrio - string conductor (1, 3, 8)
- Paul Shure - concertmaster (1, 3, 8)
- Ernie Watts - saxophone (1, 3, 8)
- Buzz Brauner - flute (2, 3), piccolo (4, 5)
- George Bohanon - trombone (1, 3, 8)
- Oscar Brashear - trumpet (1, 3, 8)
- Bert DeCoteaux - rhythm tracks, string and horn arrangements (2, 4–7)
- Keith Howard - drums (2, 4–7)
- Byron Gregory - electric guitar (2, 4–7)
- Derf Reklaw-Raheem - percussion (2, 4–7)
- Fred White - drums (3)
- Victor Feldman - electric piano (3), percussion (3)
- Ron Harris - bass (4–7)
- Johnny Graham - guitar (8)

=== Technical ===
- Larry Dunn (1, 3, 8) - producer
- Bert DeCoteaux (2, 4–7) - producer
- Jack Rouben & Robert Fernandez (1, 3, 8) - mixing
- Edward Sprigg & Michael Ruffo (2, 4–7) - mixing
- Paul Serrano (2, 4–7) - recording engineer
- Ray Janos - mastering

== Charts ==
Chart	Peak position
US Billboard Best Selling Jazz LPs	3
US Billboard Top LPs	111
