= Cazenovia College =

Former private college in Cazenovia, New York, U.S.

- Former name: List: Genesee Seminary; Oneida and Genesee Conference Seminary; Oneida Conference Seminary; Central New York Conference Seminary; Cazenovia Seminary (1894–1942); Cazenovia Junior College (1942–1961); Cazenovia College for Women (1961–1982)
- Type: Private college
- Active: 1824–2023; 3 years ago
- Endowment: $32.2 million (2014)
- Faculty: 154 (54 full-time, 100 part-time)
- Students: 800 (Fall 2020)
- Undergraduates: 775 (Fall 2020)
- Postgraduates: 25 (Fall 2020)
- Location: Cazenovia Village, Cazenovia Town, New York, United States; 42.9320°N 75.8538°W
- Colors: Blue & gold
- Nickname: Wildcats
- Sporting affiliations: NCAA Division III – NAC
- Website: cazenovia.edu
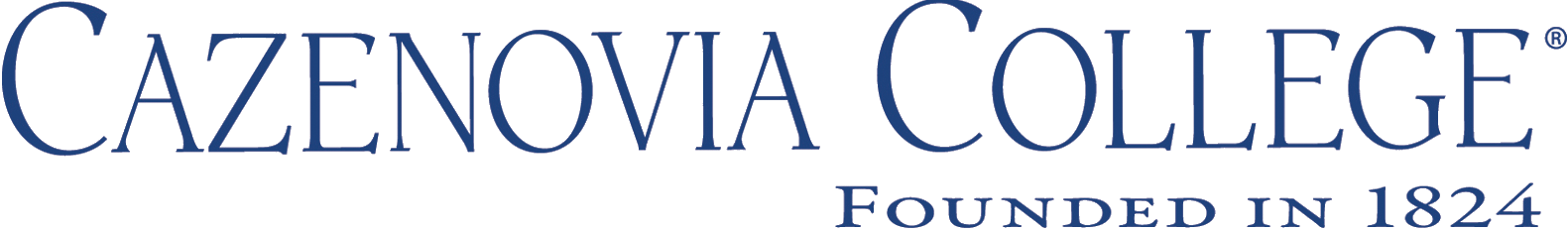

Cazenovia College was a private college in Cazenovia Village, Cazenovia Town, New York. Founded as the Genesee Seminary in 1824 and sponsored by the Methodist Church in 1894, the college adopted the name of "Cazenovia Seminary". It was reorganized in 1942 after church sponsorship was withdrawn and was Cazenovia College for Women from 1961 to 1982, when the college became co-educational again. It closed on June 30, 2023, due to poor finances and other economic issues.

== History ==
Cazenovia College began in 1824 as the "Genesee Seminary" and was the second Methodist seminary to be established in the United States. Between 1904 and 1931, it functioned as a secondary school for local young people, an arrangement that ended when Cazenovia Central High School was built. It was sponsored by the Methodist Church but was a non-sectarian institution. It was initially located in the old Madison County Courthouse. Cazenovia was co-educational from its foundation. The seminary was created at the instigation of George Peck and several other prominent clergymen in the area. In 1839, the seminary initiated a three year course, as it was called, which was focused at the education of women. The seminary also had a missionary course, and in 1843 Sophronia Farrington (class of 1828) went out as the first female missionary to Africa, under the auspices of the Young Men's Missionary Society of Boston. This was the earliest foreign mission established by the Methodist Episcopal Church.

Later the institution was known as Cazenovia Seminary. It was known as the "Oneida and Genesee Conference Seminary", the "Oneida Conference Seminary", and the "Central New York Conference Seminary" over the years. It did not officially adopt the name "Cazenovia Seminary" until 1894 but the name was at times used from its inception and is often used to refer to it at any time before it became a college.

In 1942 church sponsorship of Cazenovia was withdrawn and it was reorganized to include a junior college program as well as the prep school with the name of "Cazenovia Junior College". It then became "Cazenovia College for Women" in 1961. In 1982 it returned to being co-educational and adopted its final name, "Cazenovia College", although it was not recognized as a bachelor's degree-granting institution until 1988. In 2019 it began its first graduate program, a Master of Science in Clinical Mental Health Counseling.

=== Closure ===
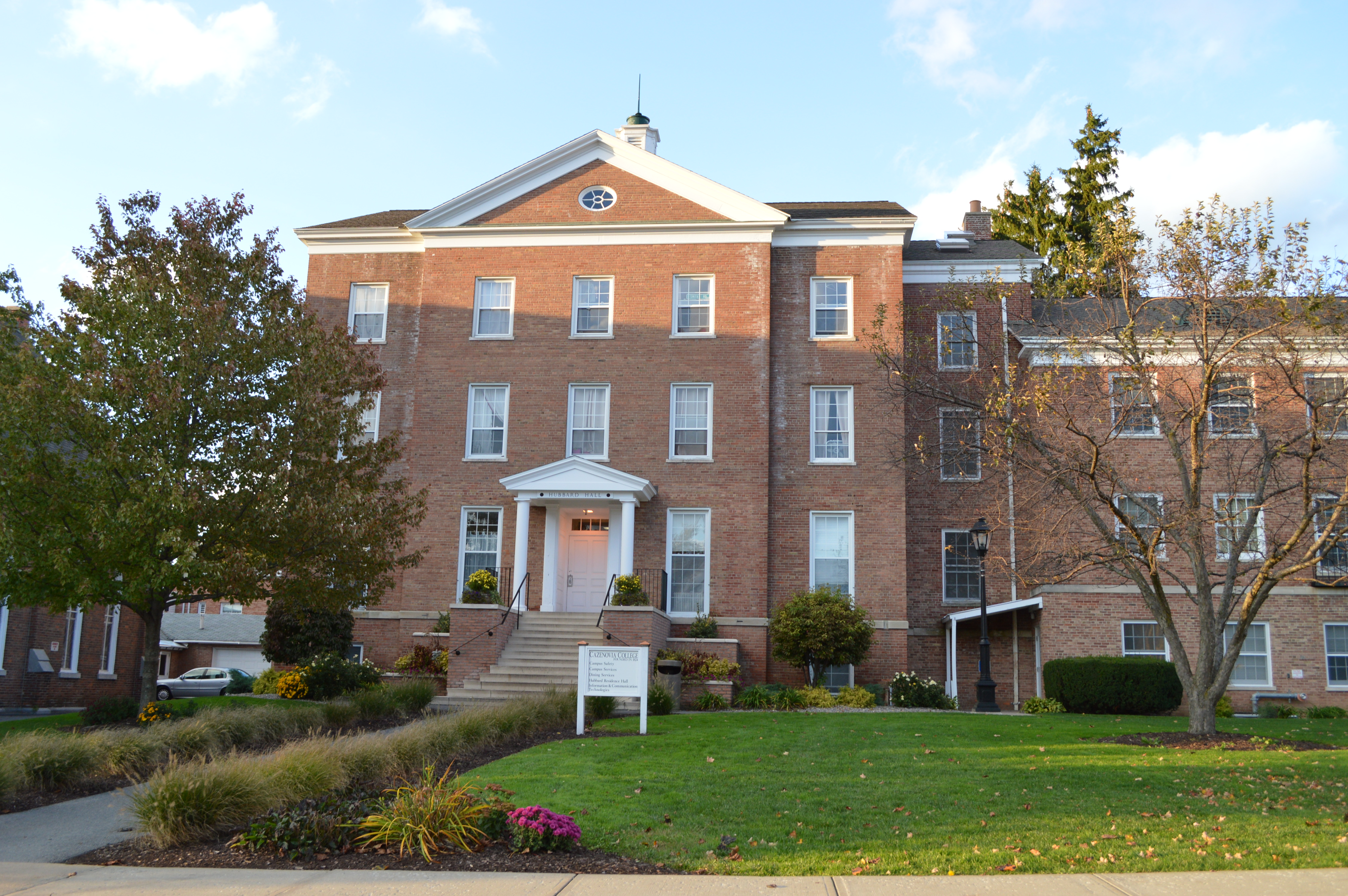
Hubbard Hall

In September 2022, after a failed attempt to refinance debt, the college defaulted on a $25 million bond payment owed to the Madison County Capital Resource Corporation. On December 7, 2022, it was announced that the school would permanently close, citing poor finances as the main reason. The final commencement took place on May 13, 2023. In addition, there was an online-only session of summer classes ending June 25, 2023 with a final closure date of June 30, 2023. The final president of the college was David Bergh. The college's records are maintained by nearby Le Moyne College.

=== Further uses and sale of campus ===
In April 2023, the entire campus was put up for sale by A&G Real Estate Partners.

In fall 2023, the New York State Police used the former campus as a state police training academy, continuing to operate there until August 2025.

In December 2025, a group of local investors bought the entire campus for $9.5 million.

== Campus ==
The college was in Cazenovia Village, and also in Cazenovia Town at the same time.

== Athletics ==
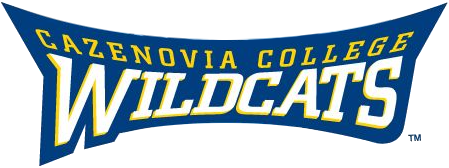
Cazenovia athletics wordmark

The Cazenovia athletic teams were called the Wildcats. The college was a member of the NCAA Division III ranks, primarily competing in the North Atlantic Conference (NAC) from 2020–21 until its closure. The Wildcats previously competed in the North Eastern Athletic Conference (now known as the United East Conference) from 2004 to 2020.

Cazenovia competed in 16 intercollegiate varsity sports. Men's sports included baseball, basketball, cross country, golf, lacrosse, soccer and swimming & diving, while women's sports included basketball, cross country, golf, lacrosse, soccer, softball, swimming & diving, equestrian and volleyball. There was also a co-ed eSports team. At various times, Cazenovia also had men's crew, equestrian, tennis and volleyball, as well as women's cheerleading, crew and tennis teams, but they no longer existed at the time of the college's closure in 2023.

== Notable alumni ==
- Lisle C. Carter – First president of the University of the District of Columbia (UDC)
- Carole Cole – CEO of King Cole Productions
- Lucinda L. Combs – First female physician to serve in China for the Women's Foreign Ministry Society
- Sophronia Farrington Cone – First female missionary to Africa
- Nathan Smith Davis – First editor of the Journal of the American Medical Association
- Wallace B. Douglas – Minnesota lawyer, judge, and state representative
- L. Fidelia Woolley Gillette – One of the first women to be ordained Universalist minister in the United States and the first woman ordained of any denomination in Canada
- Joseph B. Hamilton – Wisconsin lawyer, judge, and state senator
- Lewis Hartsough – Methodist minister and gospel song writer/composer
- Joseph E. Irish – Wisconsin clergyman and state senator
- William C. McDonald – governor of New Mexico
- John Philip Newman – bishop of the Methodist Episcopal Church; previously three times the chaplain of the United States Senate
- John W. North – Pioneer statesman and founder of Riverside, California
- Daniel D. Pratt – United States Senator from Indiana
- Eaton J. Richardson, lawyer and state legislator
- Rodney S. Rose – Pastor, father of Bayonne Whipple
- Leland Stanford – Industrialist, governor of California and U.S. Senator; founder of Stanford University
- Thomas Condon - Geologist, Congregational minister
- John E. Burton – Wisconsin businessman and mining financier
- James Wilson Seaton – American lawyer and legislator
- Harvey A. Truesdell – New York businessman and assemblyman
- Jimmy Van Heusen – American songwriter
- Daniel C. Van Norman – Canadian educator, clergyman, and school founder
- David F. Wilber – United States Representative from New York
- Barbara W. Woodlee – Former president of Kennebec Valley Community College, the first female president in both the state technical college and community college systems

== See also ==
- List of defunct colleges and universities in New York
