= On the Road to Kingdom Come =

Studio album by Harry Chapin
- Released: October 1976
- Recorded: 1976
- Genre: Pop rock
- Length: 42:11
- Label: Elektra
- Producers: Stephen Chapin, Harry Chapin

Harry Chapin chronology
Greatest Stories Live (1976)	On the Road to Kingdom Come (1976)	Dance Band on the Titanic (1977)

Singles from On the Road to Kingdom Come
- 1. "Corey's Coming" Released: November 1976

Professional ratings
Review scores
Source	Rating
AllMusic	4/5 stars

On the Road to Kingdom Come is the sixth studio album by the American singer-songwriter Harry Chapin, released in 1976. Longer versions of the songs "Corey's Coming" and "If My Mary Were Here" appeared on Chapin's 1979 live album Legends of the Lost and Found.

== Track listing ==
Side one
No.	Title	Length
1.	"On the Road to Kingdom Come"	5:26
2.	"The Parade's Still Passing By"	3:26
3.	"The Mayor of Candor Lied"	8:27
4.	"Laugh Man""	3:36

Side two
No.	Title	Length
1.	"Corey's Coming"	5:41
2.	"If My Mary Were Here"	3:32
3.	"Fall in Love With Him"	3:54
4.	"Caroline"	3:41
5.	"Roll Down the River"	4:28

== Personnel ==
- Harry Chapin - guitar, vocals
- Buzz Brauner - recorder
- Stephen Chapin - keyboards, vocals
- Carolyn Dennis - vocals
- Ron Evanuik - cello
- Donna Fein - vocals
- Howie Fields - drums, percussion
- Bobbye Hall - percussion
- Muffy Hendrix - vocals
- Sharon Hendrix - vocals
- Doug Walker - guitar, vocals
- John Wallace - bass, vocals
- Robert Ludwig - mastering engineer

== Charts ==
Chart (1976)	Peak position
Canada Top Albums/CDs (RPM)	66
Australian (Kent Music Report)	95
US Billboard 200	87
