= Dance Band on the Titanic (album) =

Studio album by Harry Chapin
- Released: September 1977
- Recorded: 1976–1977
- Genre: Pop rock
- Length: 74:31
- Label: Elektra
- Producer: Stephen Chapin

Harry Chapin chronology
| On the Road to Kingdom Come (1976) | Dance Band on the Titanic (1977) | Living Room Suite (1978) |

Dance Band on the Titanic is the seventh studio album by the American singer-songwriter Harry Chapin, released in 1977. Its vinyl release is a double album. It was later released as a single CD.

== Reception ==
Professional ratings
Review scores
| Source | Rating |
|---|---|
| AllMusic | 3.5/5 stars |
| The Rolling Stone Album Guide | 2/5 stars |

Reviewed at the time of release, Sounds wrote: "Mr Chapin is such a master at his particular craft that his music itself is totally middle class, boring and as bland as the outward appearances and the public lifestyles of the men and women in his songs. So what is Chapin trying to do? Express suburban, boredom and frustration in realistic photographic detail? He does that alright." The album sold poorly, but was voted Album of the Year by The Times of London.

== Track listing ==
Side one
| No. | Title | Length |
|---|---|---|
| 1. | "Dance Band on the Titanic" | 5:15 |
| 2. | "Why Should People Stay the Same" | 4:47 |
| 3. | "My Old Lady" | 3:52 |
| 4. | "We Grew Up a Little Bit" | 5:10 |

Side two
| No. | Title | Writer(s) | Length |
|---|---|---|---|
| 1. | "Bluesman" | | 5:18 |
| 2. | "Country Dreams" | | 4:47 |
| 3. | "I Do It for You, Jane" | Chapin, Sandy Chapin | 5:08 |
| 4. | "I Wonder What Happened to Him" | | 4:11 |

Side three
| No. | Title | Length |
|---|---|---|
| 1. | "Paint a Picture of Yourself (Michael)" | 3:52 |
| 2. | "Mismatch" | 5:00 |
| 3. | "Mercenaries" | 5:46 |
| 4. | "Manhood" | 3:48 |

Side four
| No. | Title | Writer(s) | Length |
|---|---|---|---|
| 1. | "One Light in a Dark Valley (An Imitation Spiritual)" | Kenneth Burke | 3:26 |
| 2. | "There Only Was One Choice" | | 14:01 |

== Personnel ==
- Harry Chapin – guitar, vocals
- Buzz Brauner – tenor saxophone
- Barbara Carr – vocals
- Stephen Chapin – piano, vocals
- Tom Chapin – guitar, banjo, vocals
- Harry DiVito – trombone
- Howie Fields – drums
- Steve Gadd – drums
- Marsh Lynn Goldberg – vocals
- Jeff Gross – vocals
- Neil Jason – bass
- Arthur Jenkins – percussion
- Bernie Keising – bass, vocals
- Art Krahulek – vocals
- Barbara Lindquist – vocals
- Theodore Marnel – vocals
- Craig Mitchell – vocals
- Nancy Newman – vocals
- Ronald Palmer – guitar, vocals
- John Quayle – vocals
- Elliott Randall – guitar
- Steve Randall – vocals
- Donna D. Reilly – vocals
- Kim Scholes – cello
- Tim Scott – cello
- Gus Skinas – programming
- Mike Solomon – vocals
- Chris Waite – percussion
- Doug Walker – guitar, mandolin, vocals
- John Wallace – bass, vocals

== Charts ==
| Chart (1977) | Peak position |
|---|---|
| US Billboard Top LPs & Tape | 58 |
| Canadian Albums Chart | 91 |
