= John Berg (art director) =

American art director (1932–2015)

- Born: John Hendrickson Berg; January 12, 1932; Brooklyn, New York City, New York, U.S.
- Died: October 11, 2015 (aged 83); Southampton, New York, U.S.
- Education: Erasmus Hall High School; Cooper Union
- Occupation: Art director
- Spouses: Rosamond Bassett (divorced); Durell Godfrey (m. 1982; died 2015)

John Hendrickson Berg (January 12, 1932 – October 11, 2015) was an American art director best known for his works at Columbia Records. Throughout his career, he won four Grammy Awards out of twenty-six nominations.

== Biography ==
Berg was born in Brooklyn and grew up in the Flatbush neighborhood, where he attended Erasmus Hall High School. While in high school, Berg drew cartoons for the school newspaper. Upon graduation, he took classes at the Cooper Union. After earning his degree, he worked for Doyle Dane Bernbach and Esquire. Berg was hired by Columbia Records in 1961 and retired from the label with the title of vice president in 1985. In two and a half decades with Columbia, Berg designed five Grammy Award-winning album covers: The Barbra Streisand Album in 1964, Bob Dylan's Greatest Hits in 1968, Underground in 1969, Chicago X in 1977, and Love Notes in 1978. He died of pneumonia in Southampton, New York on October 11, 2015, aged 83.

== Awards and nominations ==
Berg has received a total of 4 wins and 26 nominations from the Grammy Awards.

Year	Nominee / work	Award	Result
1964	The Barbra Streisand Album	Best Album Cover - Other Than Classical	Won
1964	Beethoven: Symphony No. 5 In C Minor, Op.67	Best Album Cover - Classical	Nominated
1965	Richard Strauss: Also Sprach Zarathustra	Best Album Cover - Classical	Nominated
1966	Bringing It All Back Home	Best Album Cover - Photography	Nominated
1966	William Tell And Other Favorite Overtures	Best Album Cover - Graphic Arts	Nominated
1966	Horowitz At Carnegie Hall - An Historic Return	Best Album Cover - Graphic Arts	Nominated
1967	Color Me Barbra	Best Album Cover - Graphic Arts	Nominated
1967	Charlie Byrd Christmas Carols For Solo Guitar	Best Album Cover - Graphic Arts	Nominated
1967	Blonde On Blonde	Best Album Cover - Photography	Nominated
1967	Turn! Turn! Turn!	Best Album Cover - Photography	Nominated
1968	Bob Dylan's Greatest Hits	Best Album Cover - Photography	Won
1968	Monk/Straight, No Chaser	Best Album Cover, Graphic Arts	Nominated
1968	Haydn: Symphony No 84 In E Flat Major And Symphony No. 85 In B Flat Major "La Reine"	Best Album Cover, Graphic Arts	Nominated
1969	Underground	Best Album Cover	Won
1969	Ives: Holidays Symphony	Best Album Cover	Nominated
1971	The World's Greatest Blues Singer	Best Album Cover	Nominated
1971	Chicago	Best Album Cover	Nominated
1972	B, S And T; 4	Best Album Cover	Nominated
1974	Chicago VI	Best Album Package	Nominated
1975	Santana's Greatest Hits	Best Album Package	Nominated
1977	Chicago X	Best Album Package	Won
1978	Love Notes	Best Album Package	Nominated
1979	Heads	Best Album Package	Nominated
1980	Ramsey	Best Album Package	Nominated
1981	Chicago XIV	Best Album Package	Nominated
1987	The Voice - The Columbia Years 1943-1952	Best Album Package	Nominated
