= Dodsworth (play) =

1934 three-act play by Sidney Howard

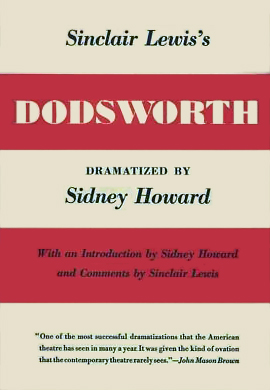
First edition 1934

Dodsworth is a three-act play by Sidney Howard based on the 1929 novel by Sinclair Lewis. Through the title character, it examines the differences between American and European intellect, manners, and morals.

== Synopsis ==
Middle-aged Samuel Dodsworth is the head of Revelation Motor Company, an automobile manufacturing firm. His wife Fran, a shallow and vain woman obsessed with the notion of growing old, convinces her spouse Sam to sell his interest in the company and take her to Europe. Before long, Fran begins to view herself as a sophisticated world traveler and Sam as boring and unimaginative. Searching for excitement in her life, she begins spending time with other men and eventually informs Sam that she's leaving him for a member of royalty. While in Italy, Sam reunites with Edith Cortright, a widow he first met while en route to Europe via ship, and the two fall in love. Without warning, he breaks off their relationship, then realizes just how much he cares for her.

== Production ==
The first Broadway production opened at the Shubert Theatre on February 24, 1934, and ran for 147 performances. It was produced by Max Gordon and directed by Robert B. Sinclair. It was included in Burns Mantle's The Best Plays of 1933-1934.

The cast included Walter Huston as Samuel Dodsworth, Fay Bainter as Fran Dodsworth, Nan Sunderland as Edith Cortright, and Kent Smith as Kurt von Obersdorf.

Jo Mielziner's scenic designs included settings in Zenith, London, Paris, Montreux, Berlin, Naples, and Bremen.

The show reopened at the Shubert on August 20 and ran for an additional 168 performances.

== Reception ==
In his review in The New York Times, Brooks Atkinson said, "Among the virtues of Dodsworth, place Walter Huston foremost."

== Adaptations ==
In 1936, Howard wrote the screenplay for a feature film adaptation. A 1995 musical adaptation with a book and lyrics by Stephen Cole and music by Jeffrey Saver was staged in Fort Worth, Texas with Hal Linden and Dee Hoty.
