= Sweet Buns & Barbeque =

Studio album by Houston Person
- Released: 1973
- Recorded: September 11 and November 7, 1972
- Studios: Van Gelder Studio, Englewood Cliffs, NJ
- Genre: Jazz
- Length: 32:15
- Labels: Prestige; PR 10055
- Producer: Ozzie Cadena

Houston Person chronology
Broken Windows, Empty Hallways (1972)	Sweet Buns & Barbeque (1973)	The Real Thing (1973)

Sweet Buns & Barbeque is the eleventh album led by saxophonist Houston Person which was recorded in 1972 and released on the Prestige label.

== Reception ==
Professional ratings
Review scores
Source	Rating
Allmusic	3/5 stars

Allmusic awarded the album 3 stars.

== Track listing ==
1. "A Song for You" (Leon Russell) - 4:35
2. "The Trouble with Hello is Goodbye (Love Theme from “Fuzz”)" (Dave Grusin, Alan Bergman, Marilyn Bergman) - 4:00
3. "Scared to Be Alone" (Dory Previn) - 4:20
4. "Sweet Buns and Barbeque" (Houston Person, Billy Ver Planc) - 3:05
5. "This Masquerade" (Russell) - 6:20
6. "Down Here on the Ground" (Gale Garnett, Lalo Schifrin) - 3:45
7. "Put It Where You Want It" (Joe Sample) - 3:10
8. "Groove Thang" (Johnny Bristol) - 3:00

== Personnel ==
- Houston Person - tenor saxophone
- Ernie Royal, Victor Paz - trumpet (tracks 6–8)
- Frank Wess - flute, baritone saxophone (tracks 6–8)
- Richard Tee - piano, electric piano (tracks 1–3)
- Jimmy Watson - organ (track 5)
- Hugh McCracken - guitar (tracks 1 & 3)
- Joe Beck - guitar, electric guitar, arranger
- Ron Carter (tracks 1–3), George Duvivier (tracks 4–8) - bass
- Grady Tate - drums (tracks 1–3)
- Bernard Purdie - drums (tracks 4–8)
- Buddy Caldwell - congas, percussion (tracks 4, 5, 7 & 8)
- Billy Ver Planck - arranger (tracks 6–8)
