= Sophronia Farrington Cone =

American Protestant missionary in Liberia

Sophronia Farrington Cone (1801-1880) was a teacher, artist, and one of the first single female missionaries from America to Africa when she helped found a mission in Liberia in 1834.

Farrington was born in Concord, New Hampshire, in 1801 and grew up in Herkimer, New York. She enrolled at the Cazenovia Seminary in 1825 and left in 1828 to attend the female seminary in Utica, New York. Farrington then taught at a school in Onondaga, New York, and the female seminary in Salem, Massachusetts. In 1843 she sailed to Liberia and became the first single female missionary to go to Africa, working with the Young Men's Missionary Society of Boston at the first foreign mission established by the Methodist Episcopal Church. Pastor Melville Cox arrived first and helped to found the College of West Africa, but Cox died shortly after arriving, of the "African fever". Farrington arrived shortly after Cox and taught at the school. Farrington almost died from the fever herself but recovered, and stayed behind in Liberia after the other missionaries left. The local residents were impressed by her artwork and teaching. In 1851 Miss Farrington married Mr. George Cone, of Utica, New York. She died in 1880.
