= Living Room Suite =

Studio album by Harry Chapin
- Released: June 1978
- Studio: Secret Sound, the Sound Factory, Record Plant, Clover
- Genre: Pop rock
- Length: 41:41
- Label: Elektra
- Producer: Chuck Plotkin

Harry Chapin chronology
Dance Band on the Titanic (1977)	Living Room Suite (1978)	Legends of the Lost and Found (1979)

Singles from Living Room Suite
- 1. "Flowers Are Red" Released: September 10, 1978

Professional ratings
Review scores
Source	Rating
AllMusic	3.5/5 stars
The Encyclopedia of Popular Music	2/5 stars
MusicHound Rock: The Essential Album Guide	2.5/5 stars
The Rolling Stone Album Guide	2/5 stars

Living Room Suite is the eighth studio album by the American singer-songwriter Harry Chapin, released in 1978.

The album peaked at No. 133 on the Billboard 200.

== Production ==
The album was produced by Chuck Plotkin. Chapin and his label were unhappy with the album, with Chapin going back to the studio to rerecord a few of the songs after the album had been released.

== Critical reception ==
Record Collector wrote that "musically, Harry occasionally steps out of his folk-friendly comfort zone, serving up some delicious blue-eyed soul on 'It Seems You Only Love Me When It Rains'."

== Track listing ==
Side one
No.	Title	Length
1.	"Dancin' Boy"	3:55
2.	"If You Want to Feel"	4:56
3.	"Poor Damned Fool"	4:36
4.	"I Wonder What Would Happen to This World"	3:33
5.	"Jenny"	4:54

Side two
No.	Title	Length
1.	"It Seems You Only Love Me When It Rains"	4:47
2.	"Why Do Little Girls"	5:12
3.	"Flowers Are Red"	4:30
4.	"Somebody Said"	5:18

== Personnel ==
- Harry Chapin – guitar, vocals
- George Bohanon – trombone
- David Burgen – harmonica
- Stephen Chapin – keyboards
- Tom Chapin – banjo, guitar
- The Cowsills – vocals
- Bob Cowsill – guitar
- Dixie Hummingbirds – vocals
- Howie Fields – drums, percussion
- Chuck Findley – trumpet
- Steve Forman – percussion
- Dennis Frick – bassoon
- Richard Hyde – trombone
- Neil Jason – bass
- Jackie Kelso – baritone saxophone
- Jim Keltner – drums
- Steve Madaio – trumpet
- Andy Newmark – drums
- Bill Payne – organ
- Herbert Rhoad – vocals
- Joe Russell – vocals
- Kim Scholes – cello
- Lou Volpe – guitar
- Doug Walker – guitar
- John Wallace – bass, vocals
- Ernie Watts – clarinet, flute, oboe, saxophone
- Sarah Jessica Parker – vocals (uncredited), "Flowers are Red"

== Charts ==
Chart	Peak position
US Billboard 200	133
