= Legacy (Ramsey Lewis album) =

Studio album by Ramsey Lewis
- Released: 1978
- Studio: Universal Studios and P.S. Studios, Chicago, Illinois
- Genre: Jazz
- Length: 42:21
- Label: Columbia
- Producer: James L. Mack, Ramsey Lewis

Ramsey Lewis chronology
Tequila Mockingbird (1978)	Legacy (1978)	Ramsey (1979)

Legacy is an album by the jazz pianist Ramsey Lewis, produced by James L. Mack and Lewis and released in 1978 by Columbia Records. The album reached No. 10 on the Billboard Jazz Albums chart.

== Critical reception ==
Professional ratings
Review scores
Source	Rating
The Encyclopedia of Popular Music	3/5 stars

The Pittsburgh Press wrote that Legacy "is a serious piece made up of toccata, adagio and fugue," adding "while rather rigidly structured, there's plenty of improvisation, and Legacy both holds together and holds your interest."

== Track listing ==
No.	Title	Writer(s)	Length
1.	"Legacy: Toccata/Adagio/Fugue"	James L. Mack	22:31
2.	"All the Way Live"	Byron Olson, M. Lang	4:27
3.	"I Love to Please You"	James L. Mack	3:49
4.	"Well, Well, Well"	James L. Mack	3:32
5.	"Moogin' On"	James L. Mack	3:22
6.	"Don't Look Back"	James L. Mack	4:40

== Credits ==
- Bass – Ron Harris
- Bass, acoustic bass – Bernard Reed
- Drums – Keith Howard
- Guitar – Byron Gregory
- Keyboards – Ramsey Lewis
- Percussion – Derf Reklaw
- Synthesizer – Terry Fryer
- Producers – James L. Mack, Ramsey Lewis
- Engineer – Stu Walder
- Arranged by Byron Olson, James L. Mack
