= Dodsworth (novel) =

1929 novel by Sinclair Lewis

- First edition
- Author: Sinclair Lewis
- Language: English
- Publisher: Harcourt Brace & Company
- Publication date: 1929
- Publication place: United States
- Media type: Print (hardback & paperback)
- Text: Dodsworth online

Dodsworth is a novel by American writer Sinclair Lewis, first published by Harcourt Brace & Company on March 14, 1929. Its subject, the differences between US and European intellect, manners, and morals, is one that frequently appears in the works of Henry James. In 1936 it was made into a movie, Dodsworth, which received seven Academy Award nominations and has been regarded as historically significant by the Library of Congress.

== Plot ==
The novel is set in the period between late 1925 and late 1927. Samuel ('Sam') Dodsworth is an ambitious and innovative automobile designer, who builds his fortunes in fictional Zenith, Winnemac, through the success of his Revelation Motor Company. Along the way, he courted and won the hand of Frances 'Fran' Voelker, a beautiful young socialite. Deciding to retire while he is still capable of enjoying his leisure, he sells out at fifty and sets out to pursue a dream he'd never allowed himself the time to realize: a leisurely trip to Europe with his wife, with aspirations to visit some manufacturing plants looking for his next challenge. His forty-one-year-old wife, however, motivated by her own vanity and fear of lost youth, is dissatisfied with married life and small town Zenith, and wants to live in Europe permanently as an expatriate, not just visit for a few months. The Dodsworths set sail for Europe, and their marriage begins to unravel.

In their extensive travels across Europe, they are soon caught up in vastly different lifestyles. Fran falls in with a crowd of frivolous socialites, while Sam plays more of an independent tourist. 'With his red Baedeker guide book in hand, he visits such well-known tourist attractions as Westminster Abbey, Notre Dame Cathedral, Sanssouci Palace, and the Piazza San Marco. But the historic sites that he sees prove to be far less significant than the American expatriates that he meets on his extensive journeys across Great Britain and continental Europe' He meets Edith Cortright, an expatriate American widow in Venice, who is everything his wife is not: self-assured, self-confident, selfless, and self-reliant. As Sam and Fran follow their own pursuits, their relationship is strained to the breaking point. Both are forced to choose between marriage and the new lifestyles they have embraced.

The novel includes detailed descriptions of Sam and Fran's tours across Europe. They leave for the Continent via steam liner from New York, landing first in England. They take in London and are invited by Major Clyde Lockert to join a weekend trip to the countryside. Later, after Lockert has made an indecent proposal to Fran, they depart for Paris, where she soon engages in a busy social life and Sam takes up sightseeing. When he decides to go back to America for his college reunion in New Haven, Fran spends the summer months on the Alpine lakes near Montreux and Stresa, where she has a romance with Arnold Israel. Once Sam has picked her up in Paris, they agree to continue their travels together, touring France, Italy, Spain, Austria, Hungary and Germany. Fran next falls in love with nobleman Kurt von Obersdorf in Berlin, and stays on with him while Sam criss-crosses Europe attempting to cope with the breakdown of his marriage. When he happens to run into Edith in Venice, she persuades him to accompany her on a visit to a village in the vicinity of Naples. Von Obersdorf calls off the marriage, and Sam joins Fran on her voyage back to New York. Three days later, he is back on the next ship to meet Edith in Paris.

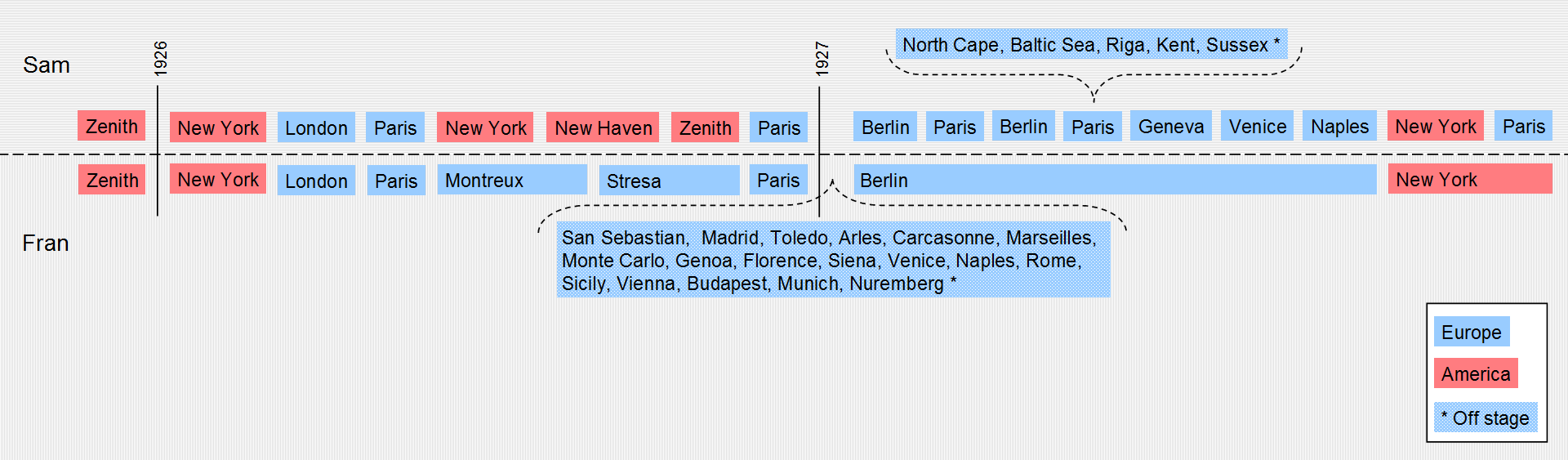
The schematic itinerary of Sam and Fran Dodsworth's travels across Europe from late 1925 to late 1927

== Adaptations ==
The novel was adapted for the stage in 1934 by Sidney Howard and filmed by producer Samuel Goldwyn in 1936 and directed by William Wyler. It starred Walter Huston, Ruth Chatterton and Mary Astor. A 1995 musical adaptation that was staged in Fort Worth, Texas with Hal Linden and Dee Hoty.

== Critique ==
In his analysis of the novel, Martin R. Ausmus has described Dodsworth as Lewis' "most sympathetic yet most savage", "most real" and "truest picture of the middle class" of America at the time. Michael Augspurger has noted the influence of the ideas of Thorstein Veblen in his analysis of the presence of ideas and ideology related to business in the novel.
