= Buzz Brauner =

American woodwind instrumentalist (1930–2001)

Background information
- Born: Stanford Wolfe Brauner; March 1, 1930; Brooklyn, New York, U.S.
- Died: January 31, 2001 (aged 70) Westwood, New Jersey, U.S.
- Genres: Jazz
- Occupation: Musician
- Instruments: Saxophone, flute, oboe, English horn, clarinet, recorder
- Years active: 1945–1983
- Spouse: Marilyn Seltzer (m. 1962)

Stanley "Buzz" Brauner (March 1, 1930 – January 31, 2001) was an American jazz instrumentalist and New York City studio musician who played saxophone, flute, oboe, English horn, clarinet, recorder, and many other woodwind instruments. Born in Brooklyn, New York in 1930, he toured the United States from 1945 to 1959 with bandleaders including Tommy and Jimmy Dorsey, Art Mooney, Ted Lewis, Richard Maltby, Buddy Morrow, and Les Elgart, except for a brief service in the U.S. Army from 1954 to 1956.

Leaving the road in 1959 for work in New York City, Brauner played in the bands for The Merv Griffin Show and The Tonight Show. He appeared in many Broadway shows including Hello, Dolly!, 1776, and A Chorus Line. He recorded records with notable artists such as Harry Chapin, Nat King Cole, and Barbra Streisand as well as played on many radio and television commercials.

His career was cut short by complications of Parkinson's disease, forcing him to retire in 1983 until his death in 2001.

== Early life ==
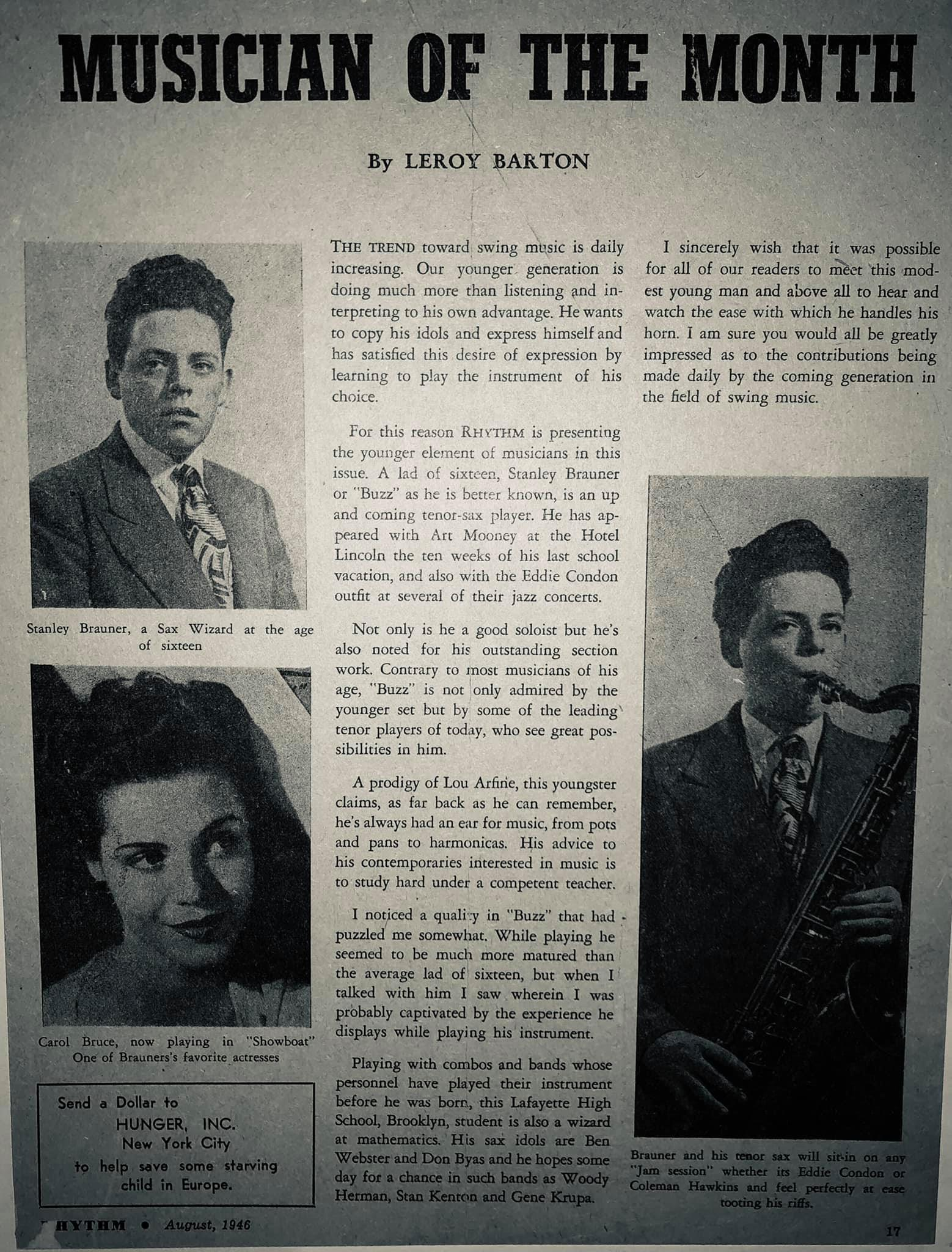
A 1946 article from Rhythm Magazine, featuring up-and-coming saxophonist Buzz Brauner

Brauner was born Stanford Wolfe Brauner in Brooklyn, New York in 1930 to parents Max Brauner and Bella Freundlich. Displaying an early talent for music, he studied saxophone with teacher Lew Arfine. He attended Lafayette High School in Brooklyn and made appearances at venues throughout New York City during his school vacations.

Not liking his birth name of Stanford, he changed his name to Stanley, however he quickly earned the stage name "Buzz" due to his distinctive tenor saxophone sound. Though not his legal name, he went by Buzz for the rest of his life. Due to a combination of his talent and a lack of available musicians due to the World War II draft, Brauner dropped out of high school in 1945 at age 15 to begin his career as a professional musician.

== Musical career ==
Brauner's first job was with the Art Mooney orchestra. He appeared on Mooney's 1948 hit recording of "I'm Looking Over a Four Leaf Clover". Touring with bandleaders including Ted Lewis, Richard Maltby, Buddy Morrow, and Les Elgart, he eventually joined the Jimmy Dorsey band in around 1952 on tenor saxophone.

Brauner's touring career was interrupted in 1954 when he was drafted into the U.S. Army. He served in the Special Services in the 69th Army Band at Fort Dix in New Jersey, attaining the rank of corporal. While in the Army, he appeared in a television program called Soldier Parade with Arlene Francis and was the director of the 69th Army Dance Band from 1955 to 1956. He left the army in 1956 and resumed working with Jimmy Dorsey, who had since reunited with his brother Tommy Dorsey, and performed as the featured jazz tenor saxophone soloist in The Dorsey Brothers band.

In 1959, after the deaths of both Tommy and Jimmy, Brauner stopped touring and began taking jobs in New York City. His first jobs were at the Roxy Theater and Radio City Music Hall. He soon began working on television show bands such as on The Merv Griffin Show, and he briefly played in The Tonight Show Band. He began learning additional instruments, studying flute with Harold Bennett, principal flautist of the Metropolitan Opera, and oboe with Don Ashworth, eventually becoming proficient on 22 woodwind instruments. He landed his first Broadway show, Bravo Giovanni, in 1962, which began a 21-year career as a Broadway orchestra musician. His most notable shows were Hello, Dolly!, performing with both Carol Channing and Pearl Bailey, 1776, and A Chorus Line.

In addition to his television and Broadway work, Brauner worked on numerous radio, television, and movie studio sessions. He recorded several albums with Harry Chapin and can be heard on Nat King Cole's Nat King Cole Sings My Fair Lady (Capitol, 1963) and Barbra Streisand's People (Columbia, 1964). He was also the original flute soloist in the Jeopardy! television show theme music, "Think!"

== Personal life ==
In 1962 at age 32, Brauner married Marilyn Seltzer, an elementary school music teacher and pianist. Living in Paramus, New Jersey, The Brauners had two sons, Stephen in 1964 and Jeffrey in 1968, and 6 grandchildren.

Brauner was forced to retire from working as a professional musician due to Parkinson's disease in 1983. Moving to Emerson, New Jersey, he continued to be interested in music and photography. He died in 2001 at age 70 due to complications of Parkinson's.

== Broadway Shows ==
- Bravo Giovanni (1962)
- Hello, Dolly! (1964–1967)
- How Now, Dow Jones (1967–1968)
- 1776 (1969–1970)
- Applause (1970–1972)
- Seesaw (1973)
- Lorelei (1974)
- Mack and Mabel (1974)
- The Night That Made America Famous (1975)
- A Chorus Line (1975–1983)

== Discography ==
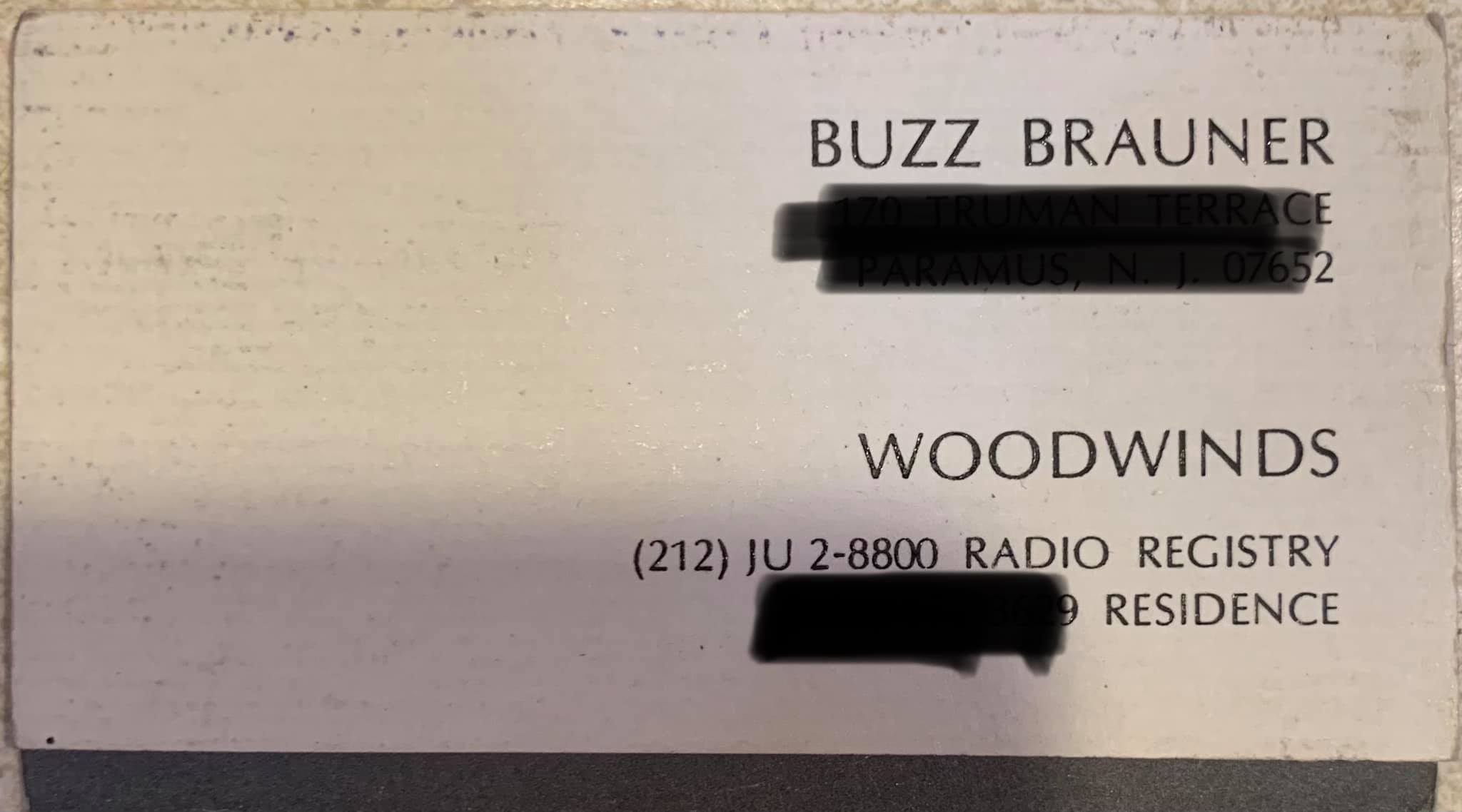
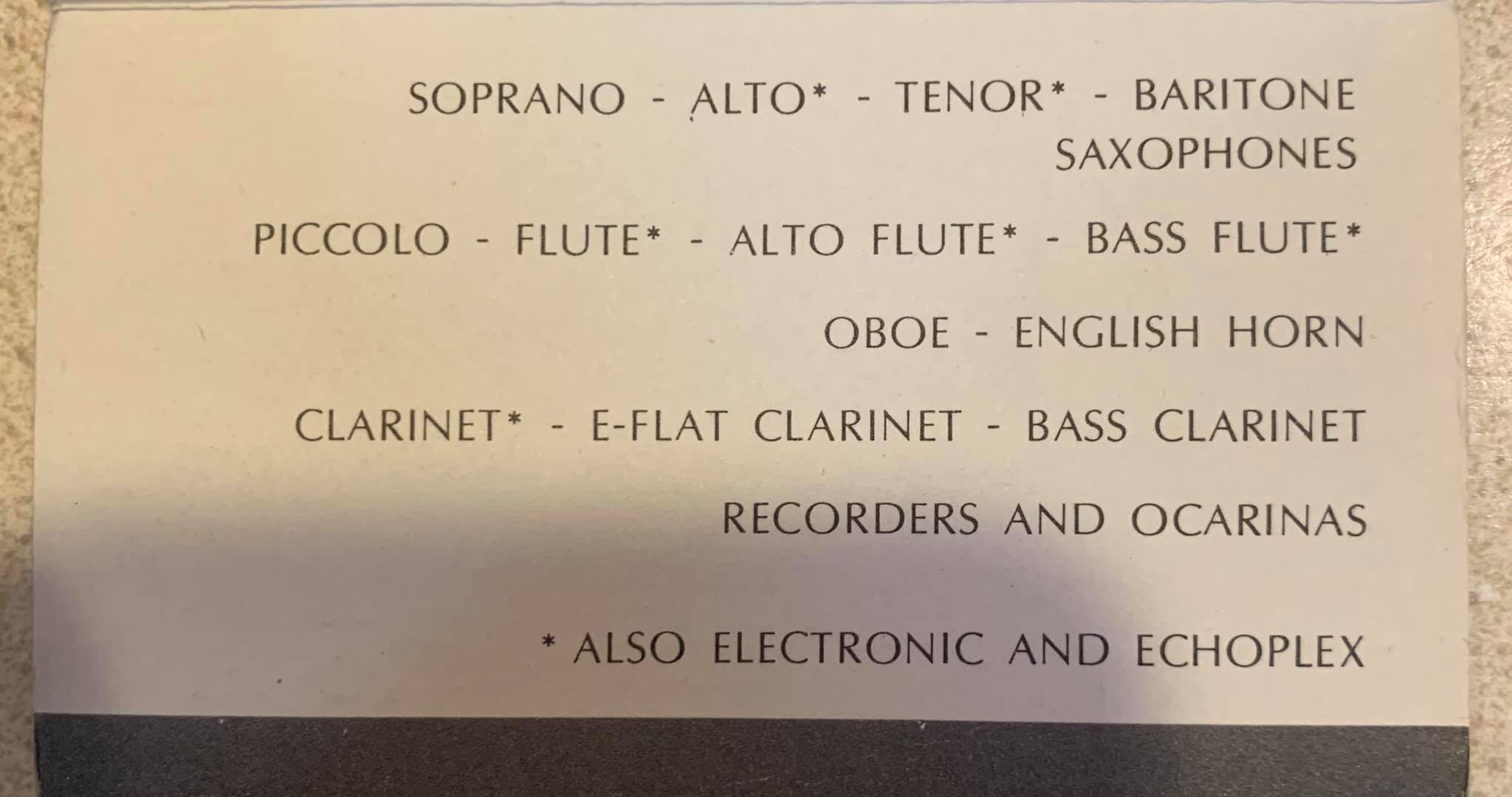
Brauner's unique 2-page fold out business card needed to fit all of his instruments
- "I'm Looking Over a Four Leaf Clover" (1948) – Art Mooney
- In a Sentimental Mood... (Decca, 1956) – Tommy Dorsey and His Orchestra
- The Fabulous Jimmy Dorsey (Fraternity, 1957) – Jimmy Dorsey
- Dancing Jazz (Savoy, 1957) – Billy Ver Planck
- Hawaii Swings (Capitol, 1960) – Bobby Hackett
- Brilliant Big Band Ballads And Blues (Roulette, 1962) – Richard Maltby and His Orchestra
- Bravo Giovanni (Masterworks, 1962) – Original Broadway Cast Recording
- Potent 8 (Sesac, 1962) – The Richard Maltby Octet
- Light Fantastic (Stateside, 1963) – Joseph Liebman
- Nat King Cole Sings My Fair Lady (Capitol, 1963) – Nat King Cole
- Hello, Dolly! (Masterworks, 1964) – Original Broadway Cast Recording
- People (Columbia, 1964) – Barbra Streisand
- "Think!" (1964) – Jeopardy! television theme
- How Now, Dow Jones (RCA, 1968) – Original Broadway Cast Recording
- 1776 (Masterworks, 1969) – Original Broadway Cast Recording
- Applause (ABC, 1970) – Original Broadway Cast Recording
- Broken Windows, Empty Hallways (Prestige, 1972) – Houston Person
- A Chorus Line (Masterworks, 1975) – Original Broadway Cast Recording
- Lorelei (MGM, 1973) – Original Broadway Cast Recording
- Seesaw (Buddah, 1973) – Original Broadway Cast Recording
- Mack & Mabel (ABC, 1974) – Original Broadway Cast Recording
- Circle of Love (Atco, 1975) – Sister Sledge
- On the Road to Kingdom Come (Elektra, 1976) – Harry Chapin
- Dance Band on the Titanic (Elektra, 1977) – Harry Chapin
- Tequila Mockingbird (Columbia, 1977) – Ramsey Lewis
- Has It All (Arista, 1978) – Garnet Mimms
- One Night Stand With Charlie Barnet on the Air in the Fifties (Joyce, 1980) – Charlie Barnet
- One Night Stand With Jimmy Dorsey at the Statler (Joyce, 1984) – Jimmy Dorsey
- The Gold Medal Collection (Elektra, 1988) – Harry Chapin
- Dorsey Brothers Orchestra (PMF, 1997)
