= Candor (village), New York =

Candor, New York
- Village
- Location within the state of New York
- Coordinates: 42°13′49″N 76°20′16″W
- Country: United States
- State: New York
- County: Tioga
- Settled: 1794
- Incorporated: 1900
- Named after: Unknown

Area
  - Total: 0.44 sq mi (1.13 km^{2})
  - Land: 0.44 sq mi (1.13 km^{2})
  - Water: 0 sq mi (0.00 km^{2})
- Elevation: 902 ft (275 m)

Population (2020)
  - Total: 786
  - Density: 1,804.0/sq mi (696.53/km^{2})
- Time zone: UTC-5 (Eastern (EST))
  - Summer (DST): UTC-4 (EDT)
- ZIP code: 13743
- Area code: 607
- FIPS code: 36-12210
- GNIS feature ID: 0945764
- Website: www.villageofcandorny.org

Candor is a village located in the Town of Candor in Tioga County, New York, United States. The population was 851 as of the 2010 census. It is part of the Binghamton Metropolitan Statistical Area.

The Village of Candor is centrally located in the town and is south of Ithaca.

== History ==
The first settlers arrived around 1794. In 1813 a fire burned much of the community. The source and meaning of the village name is not known. The community was formed from the consolidation of the neighboring communities of Candor Center and Candor Corners.

The village was incorporated in 1900.

The John W. McCarty House was listed on the National Register of Historic Places in 2001.

== Geography ==
Candor is located at 42°13′48″N 76°20′16″W (42.230169, -76.337909).

According to the United States Census Bureau, the village has a total area of 0.4 square mile (1.1 km^{2}), all land.

Candor is at the junction of New York State Route 96 and New York State Route 96B (Ithaca Road). County Road 103 enters the village from the north.

The Catatonk Creek flows past the village.

== Demographics ==
Historical population
Census	Pop.	Note	%±
1840	300		—
1850	300		0.0%
1860	350		16.7%
1910	737		—
1920	699		−5.2%
1930	669		−4.3%
1940	661		−1.2%
1950	802		21.3%
1960	956		19.2%
1970	939		−1.8%
1980	917		−2.3%
1990	869		−5.2%
2000	855		−1.6%
2010	851		−0.5%
2020	786		−7.6%
U.S. Decennial Census

As of the census of 2000, there were 855 people, 346 households, and 223 families residing in the village. The population density was 1,931.9 inhabitants per square mile (745.9/km^{2}). There were 373 housing units at an average density of 842.8 per square mile (325.4/km^{2}). The racial makeup of the village was 96.61% White, 0.47% Black or African American, 0.23% Native American, 0.12% Asian, 0.47% from other races, and 2.11% from two or more races. Hispanic or Latino of any race were 1.75% of the population.

There were 346 households, out of which 36.7% had children under the age of 18 living with them, 43.1% were married couples living together, 15.6% had a female householder with no husband present, and 35.3% were non-families. 30.6% of all households were made up of individuals, and 13.0% had someone living alone who was 65 years of age or older. The average household size was 2.47 and the average family size was 3.08.

In the village, the population was spread out, with 30.3% under the age of 18, 8.1% from 18 to 24, 30.4% from 25 to 44, 20.2% from 45 to 64, and 11.0% who were 65 years of age or older. The median age was 34 years. For every 100 females, there were 84.3 males. For every 100 females age 18 and over, there were 81.2 males.

The median income for a household in the village was $30,313, and the median income for a family was $38,750. Males had a median income of $24,583 versus $22,500 for females. The per capita income for the village was $15,713. About 11.9% of families and 11.9% of the population were below the poverty line, including 15.6% of those under age 18 and 16.7% of those age 65 or over.

== Education ==
It is within the Candor Central School District.

== Additional facts about Candor village ==
- The sociological study, Small Town in Mass Society: Class, Power and Religion in a Rural Community by A.J. Vidich and J. Bensman is about Candor and its environs.
- The singer/songwriter Harry Chapin composed a song referring to the village's name in "The Mayor of Candor Lied". The song's content is fictional, but Chapin uses the village's name ironically in the song's story. He was familiar with the village and town from his days at Cornell University in nearby Ithaca.
