= John W. McCarty House =

Historic house in New York, United States

- U.S. National Register of Historic Places
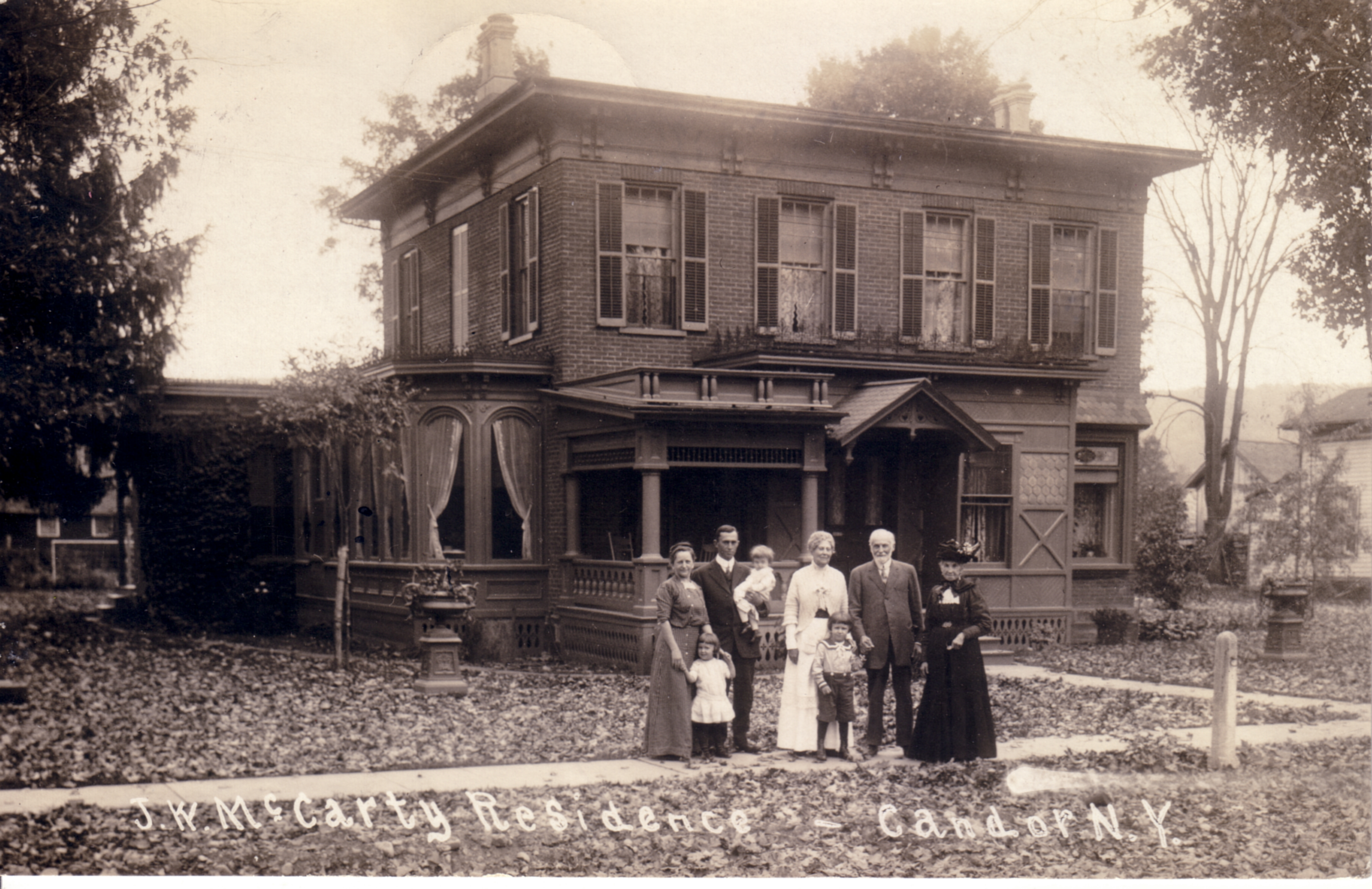
- House and family c. 1910

- Location within New York Location within the United States
- Location: 118 Main St., Candor, New York
- Coordinates: 42°13′52″N 76°20′27″W
- Area: less than one acre
- Built: 1850
- Architectural style: Italianate, Queen Anne, et al.
- NRHP reference No.: 01000249
- Added to NRHP: March 12, 2001

John W. McCarty House is a historic home located at Candor in Tioga County, New York. It was built in 1850 and is an early expression of Italianate style architecture, with later Queen Anne style modifications. The asymmetrically massed brick building consists of a two-story square shaped main block with a one-story rear wing.

It was listed on the National Register of Historic Places in 2001.
