= Broken Windows, Empty Hallways =

Studio album by Houston Person
- Released: 1972
- Recorded: May 1, 1972
- Studio: Van Gelder Studio, Englewood Cliffs, New Jersey
- Genre: Jazz
- Length: 35:12
- Label: Prestige; PR 10044
- Producer: Ozzie Cadena

Houston Person chronology
Houston Express (1971)	Broken Windows, Empty Hallways (1972)	Sweet Buns & Barbeque (1972)

Broken Windows, Empty Hallways is the tenth album led by saxophonist Houston Person which was recorded in 1972 and released on the Prestige label.

== Reception ==
Professional ratings
Review scores
Source	Rating
Allmusic	2.5/5 stars
The Penguin Guide to Jazz Recordings	3/4 stars

Ronnie D. Lankford Jr. of Allmusic stated, "Broken Windows, Empty Hallways is finally an album for people who like jazzy sounding instrumentals, but don't really like jazz".

== Track listing ==
All compositions by Houston Person except where noted.

1. "I Think It's Going to Rain Today" (Randy Newman) – 5:53
2. "Don't Mess with Bill" (Smokey Robinson) – 3:00
3. "Everything's Alright" (Tim Rice, Andrew Lloyd Webber) – 4:18
4. "Mr. Bojangles" (Jerry Jeff Walker) – 3:52
5. "Moan Er-uh Lisa" – 6:11
6. "Imagine" (John Lennon) – 3:52
7. "Let's Call This" (Thelonious Monk) – 4:03
8. "Bleeker Street" – 4:03

== Personnel ==
- Houston Person – tenor saxophone
- Victor Paz, Joe Wilder – trumpet
- Jim Buffington – French horn
- Hubert Laws – flute
- Ronnie Jannelli – flute, clarinet, baritone saxophone
- Buzz Brauner – tenor saxophone, baritone saxophone, English horn, oboe, piccolo flute, flute, clarinet
- Cedar Walton – piano
- Joe Beck – guitar
- Ernie Hayes (tracks 1–7), Jimmy Watson (track 8) – organ
- Grady Tate – drums
- Buddy Caldwell – congas [1, 3]
- Bunny Briggs – tap dance (track 4)
- Billy Ver Planck – arranger, conductor
