= Sarah Warren Keeler =

19th Century American educator

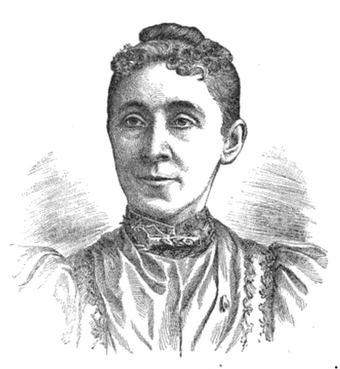
- Sarah Warren Keeler in 1895
- Born: May 3, 1844; Candor, New York, United States
- Died: September 13, 1899 (aged 55); Post-Graduate Hospital, New York City
- Resting place: Candor, New York
- Education: State Normal School at Albany, Woman's Law School, New York Law School
- Occupation: educator
- Known for: teaching deaf-mutes
- Notable work: Principal of Keeler Private Articulation Class for Deaf-Mutes

Sarah Warren Keeler (3 May 1844 – 13 September 1899) was an American educator and teacher who founded and was principal of a school for the deaf-mute in New York.

== Early life and education ==
Keeler was born at Candor, Tioga County, New York in 1844. She graduated from the state normal school at Albany at the age of 17. She also graduated at the Woman's Law School. She graduated in June 1899 from the New York Law School.

== Career ==
She spent several years in teaching at various schools for young women. She next went to teach in the School for Improved Instruction of Deaf-Mutes in New York from 1875 to 1885 where she found her life's work, as she loved teaching the deaf. Her patient kindness won the love of her pupils. After leaving the institution, she was the principal of her own Keeler Private Articulation Class for Deaf-Mutes from 1885 to 1893, a private class for an average of nine students a year aged nine to eighteen taught by herself and her small staff, run in connection with her school for young women at various locations in New York before settling at 27 East Forty-Sixth Street. Keeler favoured the European method of teaching the deaf, which emphasized teaching of articulation through imitation of breathing patterns and larynx vibrations (oralism), rather than sign language. Some considered this method far better in restoring the deaf to society and giving them a fuller knowledge of language, but was mostly rejected in the United States in favor of sign language. In her obituary, her brother George Keeler wrote that at her school, Keeler met "with unvarying success" in bringing the deaf "to a knowledge of the world outside of the silent one they occupied".

The obituary by her brother described Keeler as loving, kind and faithful as she went forward with her work. She took up and mastered German, French and Latin and in about 1890 she spent some time in Germany, Britain and France among some of the deaf schools there to learn anything that would assist in a better knowledge of how to teach the deaf.

== Personal life and death ==
She was a member of the Madison Avenue Methodist Episcopal Church.

She went to Nyack to visit a pupil for the summer. She fell from her wheel and sprained her foot and knee, came back to New York for treatment, and had a paralytic stroke that rendered her speechless and paralysed her right side. She died at the Post-Graduate Hospital on September 13, 1899. She was buried at Candor, New York.
