= Candor Central School District =

School district in New York, United States

Address
- 1 Academy St Candor, NY 13743 Candor, New York, 13743; United States
- Coordinates: 42.228561°N 76.337424°W

District information
- Type: Public (rural)
- Grades: PK–12
- Superintendent: Kimberleigh Nichols
- NCES District ID: 3606420

Students and staff
- Students: 680 (2024)
- District mascot: Coyotes
- Colors: Blue and white

Other information
- Website: www.candorcs.org

Candor Central School District is a public school district located in Candor, New York, approximately 20 miles south of Ithaca.The District serves students in the Town and Village of Candor, as well as parts of Owego to the South, Willseyville to the North, and Brooktondale to the Northeast. During the 2023–24 school year, it had an enrollment of 680 students in grades K-12. It has two instructional buildings located on one campus. Students in grades PK-6 attend the elementary school and students in grades 7-12 attend the Junior/Senior High School.

== List of schools ==
- High School (Grades 7–12):
  - Candor Junior / Senior High School
- Elementary School (Grades K-6):
  - Candor Elementary School

== Athletics ==
Candor Central School District is part of the Interscholastic Athletic Conference and Section IV of the New York State Public High School Athletic Association (NYSPHSAA). In 2016, it entered into a merger agreement with neighboring Spencer-Van Etten School District with the purpose of combining team sizes for teams with historically low enrollment. Merged sports teams include football, cross country, wrestling, and field hockey.

Sports teams that are not merged are classified as Class D in the NYSPHSAA. Sports teams that are merged are usually Class C teams.

== See also ==
- List of school districts in New York
