= Willseyville, New York =

- Hamlet
- Location within New York Location within the United States
- Coordinates: 42°17′24″N 76°22′42″W
- Country: United States
- State: New York
- County: Tioga
- Elevation: 948 ft (289 m)
- Time zone: UTC-5 (Eastern (EST))
  - Summer (DST): UTC-4 (EDT)
- ZIP code: 13864
- Area code: 607
- GNIS feature ID: 971391

Willseyville is a hamlet in Tioga County, New York, near Ithaca. The community is located along New York State Route 96B, 4.4 miles (7.1 km) north-northwest of Candor. Willseyville has a post office with ZIP code 13864, which opened on December 8, 1827.
