= Harvey A. Truesdell =

American politician (1849–1921)

Harvey A. Truesdell (October 22, 1849 – April 24, 1921) was an American businessman and politician from New York.

== Life ==
Truesdell was born on October 22, 1849, in Rockdale, New York, the son of farmer George A. Truesdell and Rhoda Richmond.

Truesdell grew up on his father's farm and attended Cazenovia Seminary and Norwich Academy. After finishing school, he spent the next four winters teaching. He then moved to Mount Upton, where he opened a hardware store with a Mr. Brown called Truesdell & Brown. Two years later, Brown sold his interest to a Mr. Rood, and the store continued under the name Truesdell & Rood. A year later, Truesdell sold his interest to his partner and became an agent for the N. O. and W. R. R. in Mount Upton for the next thirteen years. He then left the railroad to work in the flour, feed, grain, and coal trade. He formed a partnership with F. S. Converse and spent the next five years working under the name Truesdell & Converse, at which point he bought his partner's interest and worked alone. He was a charter member and director of the Sidney National Bank and organizer and director of the Morris National Bank. He also had a 162-acre farm in Butternuts.

Truesdell was town supervisor of Guilford from 1883 to 1887, serving as chairman of the board in 1885. In 1890, he was elected to the New York State Assembly as a Republican, representing Chenango County. He served in the Assembly in 1891. He was a member and president of the school board from 1892 to 1897. In 1895, Governor Morton appointed him loan commissioner.

Truesdell was a member and steward of the Methodist Episcopal Church. In 1873, he married Ruby Chamberlain. They had one child, who died in infancy, and Ruby died in 1879. In 1881, he married Anna Babcock of New Berlin. Anna died within a year, but had a surviving son, Hobart. In 1884, he married his third wife, Nellie M. Davis of Philadelphia.

Truesdell died on April 24, 1921. He was buried in Maplewood Cemetery in Mount Upton.

New York State Assembly
Preceded by Edgar A. Pearsall	New York State Assembly; Chenango County; 1891	Succeeded by Charles H. Stanton
