= Charles H. Stanton =

American politician

Charles H. Stanton (June 29, 1838 – February 10, 1913) was an American farmer and politician from New York.

== Life ==
Stanton was born on June 29, 1838, in Otselic, New York.

In October 1861, during the American Civil War, Stanton enlisted in the 61st New York Infantry Regiment and was mustered in as a private in Company G. He was promoted to corporal in November 1861. He was discharged for disability from Fairfax Seminary Hospital near Alexandria, Virginia.

After reaching adulthood Stanton spent several years in Smyrna and Plymouth, eventually settling in Norwich. He was a town supervisor for Smyrna for several terms, and was secretary and active business manager of the Chenango County Patrons Fire Relief Association by the time he died. He worked as a farmer.

In 1891, Stanton was elected to the New York State Assembly as a Republican, representing Chenango County. He served in the Assembly in 1892 and 1893.

Stanton attended the Methodist Church. He was a member of the Grand Army of the Republic. In 1863, he married Lucy E. Glazier. They had four daughters, Hattie E. Cushman, Gertrude A. Bull, Mary L. Stewart, and Angie Cushman.

Stanton died at home on February 10, 1913. He was buried in Plymouth.

New York State Assembly
Preceded by Harvey A. Truesdell	New York State Assembly; Chenango County; 1892–1893	Succeeded by David Sherwood
