= Dodsworth (film) =

1936 film by William Wyler

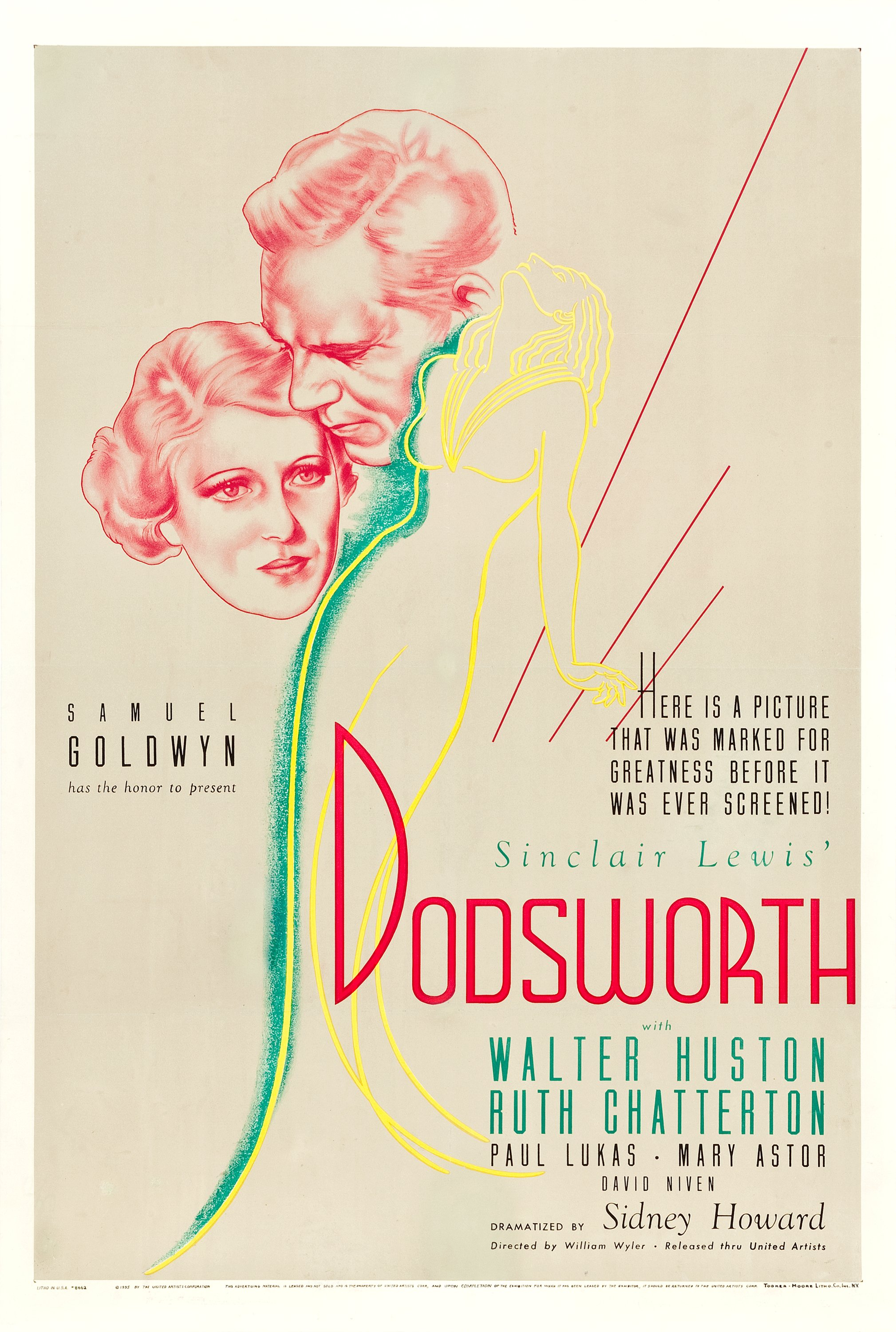
- Theatrical release poster
- Directed by: William Wyler
- Written by: Sidney Howard
- Based on: Dodsworth 1934 play by Sidney Howard; Dodsworth 1929 novel by Sinclair Lewis
- Produced by: Samuel Goldwyn; Merritt Hulburd (associate producer)
- Starring: Walter Huston; Ruth Chatterton; Paul Lukas; Mary Astor; David Niven
- Cinematography: Rudolph Maté
- Edited by: Daniel Mandell
- Music by: Alfred Newman
- Production company: Samuel Goldwyn Productions
- Distributed by: United Artists
- Release date: September 23, 1936
- Running time: 101 minutes
- Country: United States
- Languages: English (primarily), German, Italian
- Box office: $1.6 million

Dodsworth is a 1936 American drama film directed by William Wyler, and starring Walter Huston, Ruth Chatterton, Paul Lukas, Mary Astor and David Niven. Sidney Howard based the screenplay on his 1934 stage adaptation of the 1929 novel of the same name by Sinclair Lewis. Huston reprised his stage role.

The center of the film is a study of a marriage in crisis. Recently retired auto magnate Samuel Dodsworth and his narcissistic wife Fran, while on a grand European tour, discover that they want very different things out of life, straining their marriage.

The film was critically praised and nominated for seven Academy Awards, including Best Picture, Best Actor for Huston, and Best Director for Wyler (the first of his record twelve nominations in that category), and won for Best Art Direction. In 1990, Dodsworth was selected for preservation in the National Film Registry by the Library of Congress, having being deemed "culturally, historically, or aesthetically significant".

== Plot ==
When president of Dodsworth Motors, Sam Dodsworth, a successful, self-made man sells the company he founded 20 years earlier in a small mid-western town, his banker and friend warns Sam that men like them are only happy when they are working. Sam talks of the extended trip to Europe he is taking with his wife Fran, who feels trapped by their dull social life.

While travelling on the RMS Queen Mary to England, the couple meet congenial companions. Sam talks frequently to Edith Cortright, an American divorcee who resides in Italy, who is sympathetic to his eagerness to expand his horizons and learn new things. Fran flirts with and kisses a younger Englishman, Captain Lockert, but then becomes offended when he tries to become more intimate; in turn he apologizes but calls her immature for pretending to be adventurous and sophisticated. Humiliated, Fran later persuades Sam to bypass England and go directly to Paris.

Once in France, Fran imagines herself a sophisticated world traveler with a high-class social life and pretends she is much younger than her years. Sam notes that those who would socialize with "hicks" like them are not really high-class. Over time, Fran increasingly sees her husband as boring and unimaginative since he is only interested in the usual tourist sites. Before long Fran becomes infatuated with cultured playboy Arnold Iselin, who invites her to Montreux and later Biarritz. She convinces Sam to allow her to spend the summer alone in Europe. Wanting to go home, Sam consents.

At home, Sam is warmly welcomed by friends, as well as his daughter and new son-in-law, who have taken up residence in Fran's and his mansion. Soon, Sam complains that life at home has changed and he is tormented by thoughts that Fran might be changing also. When a Dodsworth manager in Europe confirms Sam's suspicions about Fran and Iselin, Sam immediately books passage to Europe. When confronted, Fran denies Sam's questions, but Iselin confirms everything. Fran breaks down and begs for forgiveness, initiating another reconciliation.

Although Sam still loves Fran, it is evident that they have been growing apart as they travel. In Vienna, their relationship becomes more strained. Even news of the birth of their first grandchild can't persuade Fran to return home. Initially it generates excitement until Fran begins to consider becoming a grandmother. Fran begs Sam not to tell their European friends. That night Fran goes dancing again with the charming, young Baron Kurt von Obersdorf who tells her he would marry her if she were free. Later, after another quarrel, Fran informs Sam that she wants a divorce. Sam relents.

While the divorce is being arranged, Sam wanders across Europe on various sightseeing activities. Finally, Sam re-encounters Edith in an American Express office in Naples, near her home. She invites him to stay at her Italian villa. Comfortable in each other's company, the two rapidly fall in love. Sam talks of starting a new business: an airline connecting Moscow and Seattle via Siberia. He asks Edith to marry him and fly with him to Samarkand and other exotic locales on his new venture. She accepts with enthusiasm.

Meanwhile, in Vienna, Fran's plans shatter when she learns that Kurt's mother has denied his request to marry Fran because he will need children to carry on the family line and Fran would be an "old wife of a young husband". In addition, divorce is against their religion. Kurt asks Fran to postpone their wedding until he can get his mother's approval, but Fran knows it is hopeless.

On a call, Sam agrees to sail home with Fran and leaves Edith and her cautions that Fran can't make him happy. On the ship, after only a short time in Fran's critical and demanding company, Sam says, "Love has to stop somewhere short of suicide." He quickly exits the ship to rejoin a smiling Edith at her villa.

== Cast ==
- Walter Huston as Sam Dodsworth
- Ruth Chatterton as Fran Dodsworth
- Paul Lukas as Arnold Iselin
- Mary Astor as Edith Cortright
- David Niven as Captain Lockert
- Gregory Gaye as Kurt Von Obersdorf
- Maria Ouspenskaya as Baroness Von Obersdorf
- Odette Myrtil as Renée De Penable
- Spring Byington as Matey Pearson
- Harlan Briggs as Tubby Pearson
- Kathryn Marlowe as Emily Dodsworth McKee
- John Payne as Harry McKee (credited as John Howard Payne)

== Production ==
Walter Huston appeared in the 1934 Broadway production, which co-starred Fay Bainter as Fran.

Billed in the cast as "John Howard Payne", John Payne made his first film appearance in a small role, portraying Dodsworth's son-in-law Harry and launching a screen career that lasted more than four decades.

The film was in production during Mary Astor's bitter divorce proceedings over her affair with dramatist George S. Kaufman. She kept a diary, and her husband threatened to have intimate details of the affair read into evidence at the divorce proceedings and in their child-custody battle. However, the diary entries were destroyed and could not be used. To avoid the press, Astor lived in her dressing room bungalow during part of the production, working on the film during the day and appearing in court in evening sessions. Ruth Chatterton accompanied her to court.

The film's sets were designed by art director Richard Day.

== Reception ==
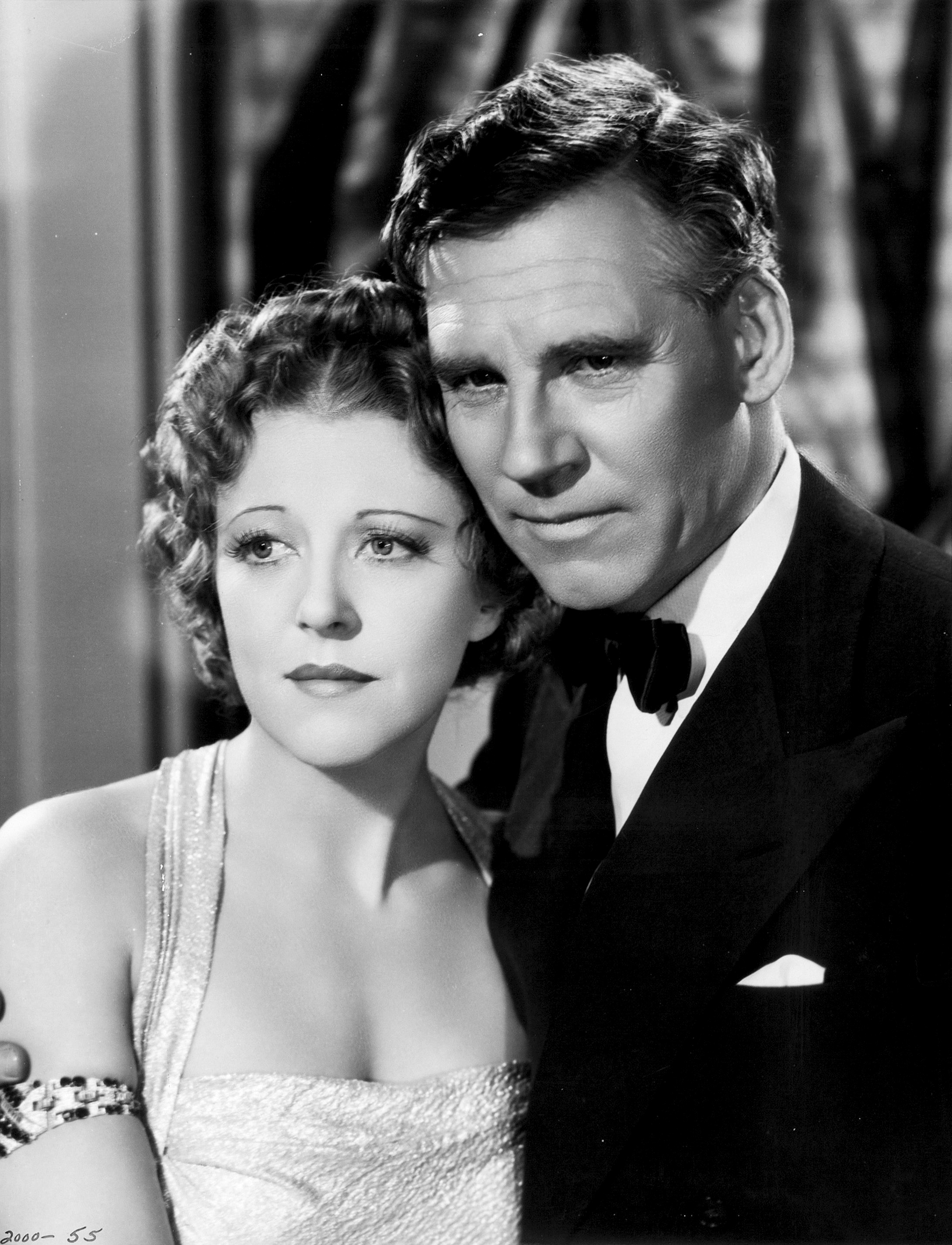
Ruth Chatterton and Walter Huston as Fran and Sam Dodsworth

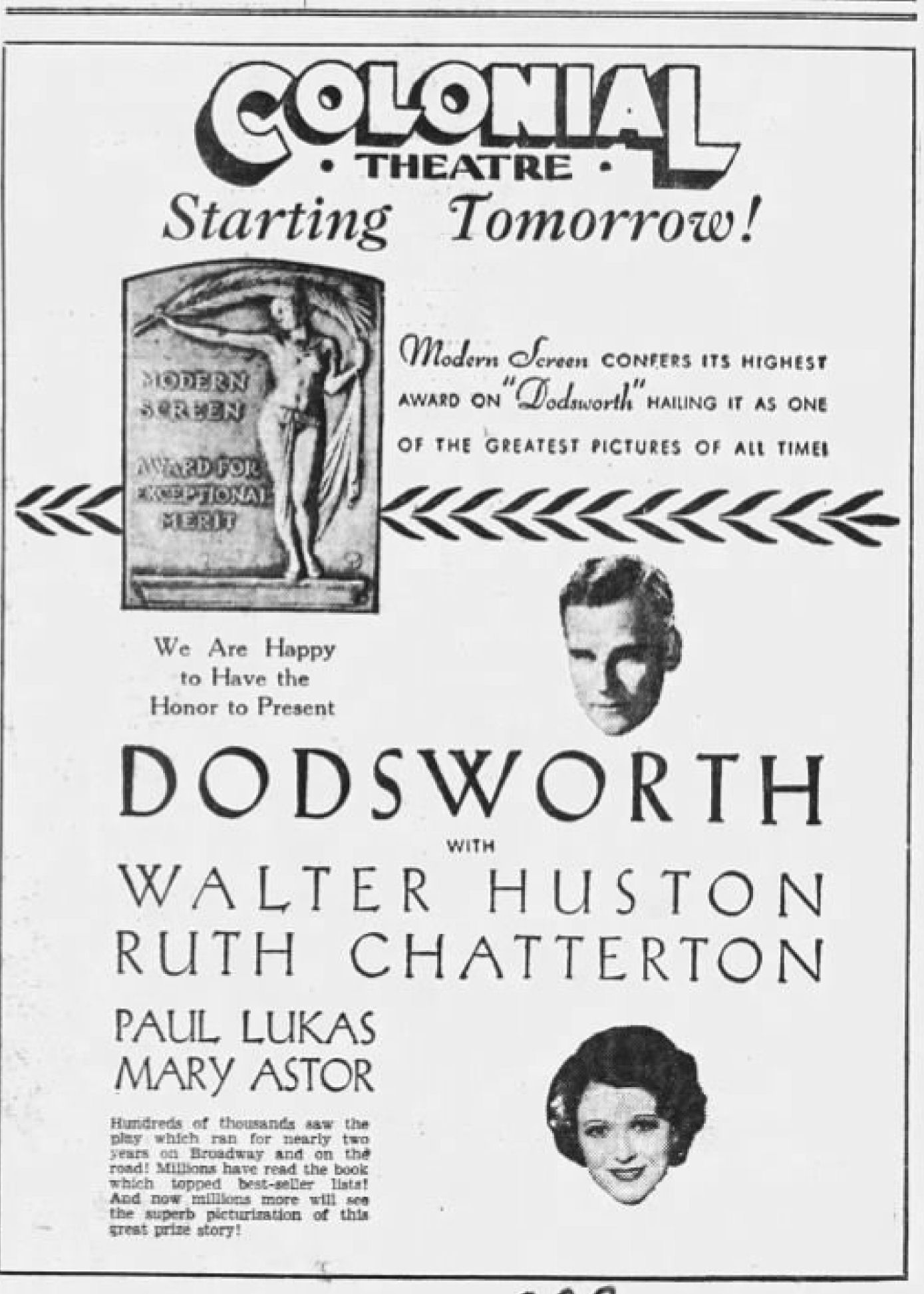
Newspaper ad for the film in 1936

Frank S. Nugent, writing for The New York Times in September 1936, described the film as "admirable", and added that director Wyler "has had the skill to execute it in cinematic terms, and a gifted cast has been able to bring the whole alive to our complete satisfaction ... The film version has done more than justice to Mr. Howard's play, converting a necessarily episodic tale ... into a smooth-flowing narrative of sustained interest, well-defined performance and good talk."

Time magazine said it was "directed with a proper understanding of its values by William Wyler, splendidly cast, and brilliantly played".

Among the film industry's leading critics in 1936, the entertainment trade publication Variety bestowed perhaps the highest praise on the production:

Dodsworth is a superb motion picture, which yields artistic quality and box office in one elegantly put together package. It rates maximum enthusiasm. It is one of the best pictures this year or any other year and a golden borealis over the producer's name. ...While the production is praiseworthy in all phases there will probably be an inclination to ascribe the tight wholeness of it all to Sidney Howard's script. He transposes his own stage play version of Sinclair Lewis into a picture that uses the camera to open up the vista a little and enrich a basically fertile theme. William Wyler's direction and the editing credited to Danny Mandel have camouflaged all the seams. Picture has a steady flow and even a dramatic wallop from zippy start to satisfying finish.

Writing for The Spectator in 1936, Graham Greene gave the film a good review, describing it as "a very well-made and well-acted film". Greene criticized the director's overuse of music which he described as "almost incessant", however he praised the "naturalness" of the picture as a quality all too rare in film.

The film was named one of the year's ten best by The New York Times, and was one of the top twenty box office films of the year.

The film historian and Turner Classic Movies host Robert Osborne named Dodsworth his favorite film.

In his 2007 book Bambi vs Godzilla: On the Nature, Purpose, and Practice of the Movie Business playwright and director David Mamet cited Dodsworth as being one of four movies that he considers "perfect films" (the other three being The Godfather, A Place in the Sun and Galaxy Quest).

In 1990, Dodsworth was selected for preservation in the United States National Film Registry. In 2005, Time magazine named it one of the 100 best movies of the past 80 years.

The February 2020 issue of New York Magazine lists this film as among "The Best Movies That Lost Best Picture at the Oscars."

On the review aggregator website Rotten Tomatoes, 90% of 21 critics' reviews are positive, with an average rating of 8.4/10.

== Awards and nominations ==
At the Academy Awards, the film was nominated for seven awards, winning one.

Wins

- Best Art Direction: Richard Day

Nominations

- Outstanding Production: Samuel Goldwyn Productions
- Best Director: William Wyler
- Best Actor: Walter Huston
- Actress in a Supporting Role: Maria Ouspenskaya
- Best Sound Recording: Thomas T. Moulton
- Best Writing (Screenplay): Sidney Howard

=== Adaptations ===
Lux Radio Theatre aired a one-hour adaptation on two occasions in 1937; first on April 12, 1937, then on October 4, 1937. Huston recreated his role for both broadcasts, and both times Fran was portrayed by his wife, Nan Sunderland.
