= Amelie Veiller Van Norman =

Amelie Veiller Van Norman (1844 – November 7, 1920) was a French-born American educator. She was the wife and successor of Rev. Daniel C. Van Norman in the proprietorship of the Van Norman Institute in New York City. She was a leader in movements for civic reform. She was the first president of the Jeanne d'Arc Suffrage League, and the vice-president of Le Lyceum Société des Femmes de France à New York. At the Paris Exposition of 1889, she received a gold medal for her work as an educator.

== Biography ==
Amélie Rebecca Veiller was born in Paris, France, 1844. Her parents were James Jacques and Caroline (Bloch) Veiller. She had an older brother, Louis, and three younger siblings, Emile, Alexis, and Caroline.

She was educated in Paris, New York City, and Philadelphia, also privately by Mesdames Mary-Savary de Passy.

In 1875, she married Rev. Daniel C. Van Norman, D.D., LL.D. They had one son, Louis.

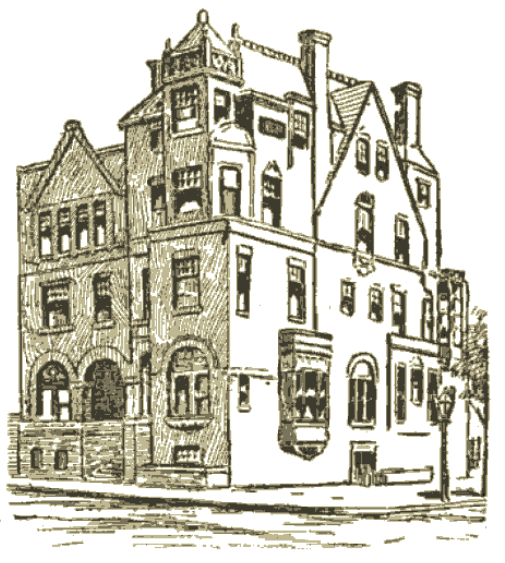
Van Norman Institute (1892)

For many years, Van Norman held positions as associate principal and proprietor of the Van Norman Institute, and after she was widowed, principal and proprietor until 1906. Thereafter, she was engaged in teaching and drawing-room talks. She wrote occasional newspaper articles.

She served as president, Van Norman Educational Institute Company; honorary president, Van Norman Alumnae Association; first vice-president, Allied Arts Association of Brooklyn; treasurer, Flatbush Political Equality League; secretary, Le Lyceum Société des Femmes de France à New York; and vice-president, Betterment League.

Van Norman favored woman suffrage. She served as president, Joan of Arc Suffrage League; vice-president, New York County Suffrage League; and was a member of Suffrage Party, New York City.

Madame Van Norman represented the Van Norman Institute at the 1889 Exposition Universelle in Paris with an exhibit which included a portfolio containing catalogues, photographs, and statistics; a complete French book by Rev. D. C. Van Norman; three volumes of boiler, pump, and steam-engine catechism by R. Grimshaw, Ph.D.; and two volumes of practical training, by R. Grimshaw. She was awarded gold and bronze medals at the Paris Exposition; also a diploma for her educational work and success in New York.

By 1914, Van Norman was residing in Mount Vernon, New York. She died at her home in that city, November 7, 1920.
