= Love Notes (Ramsey Lewis album) =

Studio album by Ramsey Lewis
- Released: 1977
- Recorded: 1976–1977
- Genre: Jazz
- Length: 35:08
- Label: Columbia
- Producers: Ramsey Lewis, Bert DeCoteaux

Ramsey Lewis chronology
Salongo (1976)	Love Notes (1977)	Tequila Mockingbird (1977)

Professional ratings
Review scores
Source	Rating
AllMusic	2/5 stars
Cashbox	(favourable)
People	(favourable)

Love Notes is a jazz album by Ramsey Lewis that was recorded in 1976–1977 and released in 1977 by Columbia. The album reached No. 7 on the US Billboard Top Jazz Albums chart and No. 31 on the US Billboard Top Soul Albums chart.

== Overview ==
This album features Lewis's collaboration with Motown artist Stevie Wonder on the songs "Spring High" and the title track, which Wonder wrote and arranged.

The artwork, designed by John Berg, received a nomination for Best Album Package at the 20th Annual Grammy Awards.

== Track listing ==
No.	Title	Writer(s)	Length
1.	"Spring High"	Stevie Wonder	4:16
2.	"Love Theme from A Star Is Born (Evergreen)"	Barbra Streisand, Paul Williams	4:28
3.	""Shining""	Zuri Raheem, Byron Gregory	4:37
4.	"Love Notes"	Stevie Wonder	6:17
5.	"Chili Today, Hot Tamale"	Zuri Raheem	5:10
6.	"The Messenger"	Byron Gregory	5:15
7.	"Stash Dash"	Zuri Raheem	4:51

== Charts ==
Chart (1977)	Peak position
US Top LPs & Tape (Billboard)	79
US Top Jazz LPs (Billboard)	7
US Top Soul LPs (Billboard)	31
