= The Mayor of Candor Lied =

1976 song by Harry Chapin

"The Mayor of Candor Lied" is a song written and sung by Harry Chapin. It was released on his 1976 album On the Road to Kingdom Come. The song tells the story of the son in a farming family anxious to marry the daughter of the town's mayor, even if he must go so far as to blackmail the mayor to get his way.

== Plot ==
Set in "the little town of Candor" (possibly referring to Candor, NY, though more likely playing on the other meaning of the word; frank honesty), the narrator introduces himself by stating that his father is a farmer and that his mother is "a neighbor who goes visiting around." However, none of that seems to bother the narrator as his focus is on the mayor's daughter, Coleen. The mayor is against the courtship of the two and plans to see his daughter married "to a better man than a boy with farmer's hands."

One day, the narrator decides to work things out with the mayor. He searches for him at his home and office with no success, only to discover the mayor out in the countryside having an affair with the narrator's mother. The narrator becomes angry with the mayor and decides to blackmail him by stating that he will keep this incident a secret to protect him in his upcoming re-election as long as the mayor promises to let him be with Coleen. The Mayor agrees, reasoning that "this piper must be paid."

One month later, the mayor is re-elected, and to celebrate, he decides to take his family (including Coleen) on a "month-long foreign vacation." The narrator waits for their return; when they finally do return, Coleen is not with them. The mayor states that Coleen decided to stay to finish her schooling and tells the narrator that he will no longer be seeing his daughter. In an ironic twist, the mayor also reveals his long-kept secret—in that he is, in fact, the narrator's biological father ("Of course, dear son, where do you think you came from in the first place?") and that they are "two of a kind."
