= Ramsey (album) =

Studio album by Ramsey Lewis
- Released: 1979
- Genre: Jazz
- Label: Columbia
- Producer: James Mack

Ramsey Lewis chronology
Legacy (1978)	Ramsey (1979)	Routes (1980)

Ramsey is a studio album by American jazz pianist Ramsey Lewis, released in 1979 on Columbia Records. The album reached No. 21 on the US Billboard Top Jazz Albums chart.

== Overview ==
Artists such as Angela Winbush, Bobby Lyle, Darlene Koldenhoven, Jim Gilstrap and Stephanie Spruill of The Blossoms appear on the album.

== Track listing ==
No.	Title	Length
1.	"Aquarius/Let The Sunshine In (From Hair)"	5:47
2.	"Wearin' It Out"	3:19
3.	"I Just Can't Give You Up"	4:23
4.	"Every Chance I Get (I'm Gonna Love You)"	3:09
5.	"Dancin'"	6:55
6.	"I'll Always Dream About You"	3:14
7.	"Medley: Intermezzo"	0:22
8.	"Spanoletta"
9.	"Don't Cry For Me Argentina (From Evita)"
10.	"Intermezzo"	1:16
