= Daniel C. Van Norman =

Canadian-born American educator, clergyman, school founder (1815–1886)

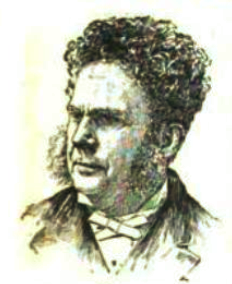
Daniel C. Van Norman

signature

Daniel C. Van Norman (August 17, 1815 - June 24, 1886) was a Canadian educator, clergyman, and school founder, who later moved to New York City.

== Early life and education ==
Daniel Cummings Van Norman was born in Nelson, Canada West, August 17, 1815.

After a thorough preparatory course, he entered Hamilton College, in Hamilton, Ontario. Van Norman was one of some 25 or 30 students who came over from Canada during the first decade of the Methodist Episcopal Church-sponsored Cazenovia Seminary, in Cazenovia, New York, where he was a student 1833–36. He was graduated at Wesleyan University in 1838.

== Career ==
He joined the Canada Wesleyan conference in 1839, and was appointed professor of classics and physics in Victoria College (now Victoria University, Toronto), Cobourg, in 1839-45. In 1844, Van Norman was ordained to the ministry.

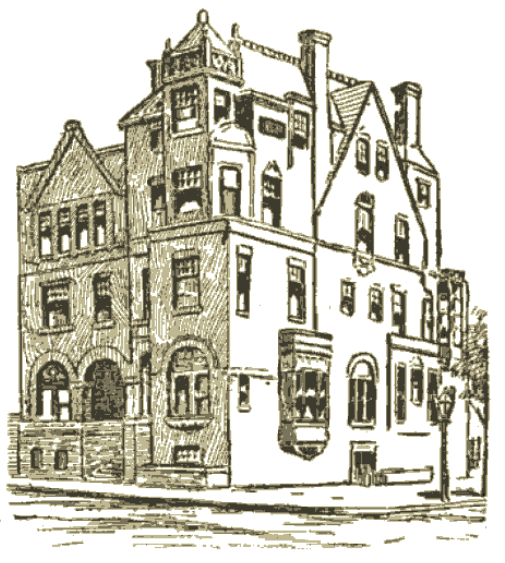
Van Norman Institute

He founded the Burlington ladies' academy, Hamilton, Ontario, in 1845, and was its principal till 1851. In 1851, he assumed the charge of Rutgers Female Institute, New York City, which post he held till 1857. He then founded and became principal of the Van Norman Institute, a school for young ladies, conducting it until the spring of 1886.

Van Norman wrote many articles for newspapers. In conjunction with Louise Pujol, he wrote a complete French text book.

He received the degree of LL.D. from Wesleyan University in 1860. Although he held no regular pastorate, he preached more than 4,000 sermons. Late in life, Van Norman left the Methodist and united with the Presbyterian church. He was recording secretary of the American Foreign and Christian Union for many years, and was one of the founders of the American Chapel in Paris.

Later in life, an Elder in the Central Presbyterian Church.

He was also a member of the Society of Science and Art, and Alpha Delta Phi fraternity.

== Personal life ==
He married Sarah Maria Spencer, of Cazenovia, New York; they had four children.

In 1875, he married Amelie Veiller of Paris, France.

== Death and legacy ==
Van Norman was taken with a stroke of paralysis on April 5, 1886, which proved fatal. He died at his residence on West 57th Street, in New York City, June 24, 1886.

A monument to his memory was erected at Jamaica, Queens, in 1900.
