= Van Norman Institute =

American girls' school

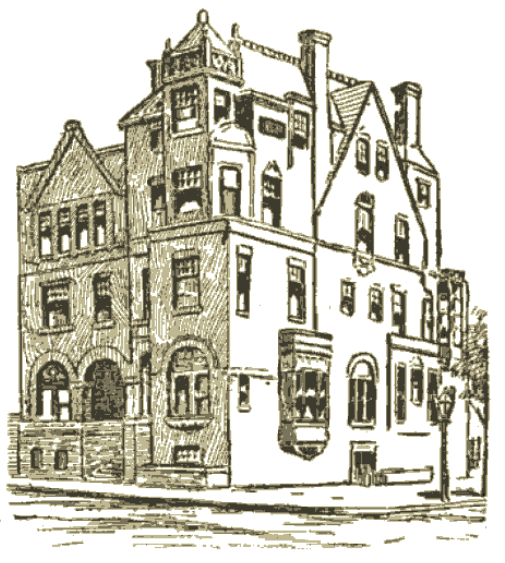
1892

Van Norman Institute for the education of young ladies (originally, Dr. Van Norman's Classical School) was an American girls' school in Manhattan, New York City. It was founded in 1857 by the Rev. Dr. Daniel C. Van Norman (1815-1886). After his death, it was conducted by his widow, Amelie Veiller Van Norman. until 1906.

== History ==
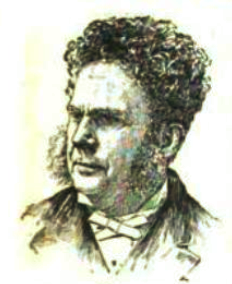
Daniel C. Van Norman

In 1857, Rev. Van Norman founded Dr. Van Norman's Classical School. It was first located at No. 79 East Fourteenth Street, near Union Square, two doors west of the Academy of Music. The institute comprised a home and day school for young ladies and children and for special students. There were small classes, and many teachers. Students received all the personal attention necessary to develop their character and to draw out their abilities. A course of studies was provided for pupils who intended to graduate, but others could select their studies.

In September 1860, the school re-opened as an English and French boarding and day school for young ladies, at Nos. 2 and 5 West 38th Street, Murray Hill, Manhattan. Special attention was paid to physical training, for which an entire story was set up. Three years later, the school occupied Nos. 3 and 5 West 38th Street. In the Boarding Department, French was the language of the family.

Born in Paris, Madame Van Norman became a teacher after her marriage in 1875 to Dr. Van Norman. She infused a fresh view into the development of his educational establishment, adding modern methods of tuition and training. The school was conducted without bigotry, either religious or intellectual, and by the absence of prizes, medals and exhibitions. Proficiency was not determined by competition, but by frequent reviews and written examinations.

The school re-opened for the September 1877 term at 316 West 58th Street East (near Central Park). It was advertised as a Family and Day School for Young Ladies, with special advantages for conversational French and German.

In 1878, the school's name changed to Van Norman Institute. Patrons of the institute resided from Massachusetts to California.

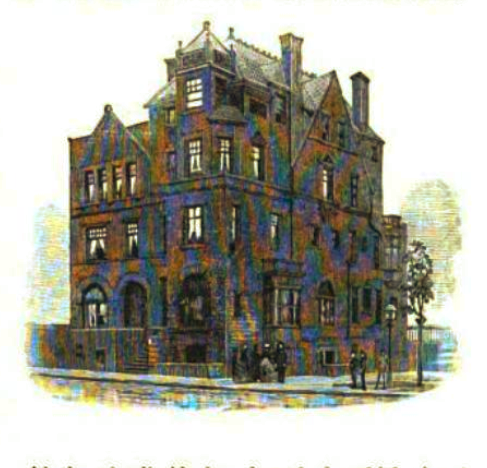
1898

By 1894, the school was situated at the corner of West End Avenue and West 71st street, near the entrance to Riverside Drive, in the highest part of the city. It overlooked the Hudson River, and was near Central Park, the Metropolitan Museum of Art, and the American Museum of Natural History. The home school featured fire escapes, sleeping system of bedrooms (there were no dormitories), as well as drawing rooms and libraries.

The Van Norman Institute was represented at the 1889 Exposition Universelle in Paris. Madame Van Norman's exhibit included one portfolio containing catalogues, photographs, and statistics; a complete French book by Rev. D. C. Van Norman; three volumes of boiler, pump, and steam-engine catechism by R. Grimshaw, Ph.D.; and two volumes of practical training, by R. Grimshaw.

In 1899, the school was located at 120-122 West 70th Street, Manhattan.

The historic Cornelius Roberts mansion, in Flatbush, Long Island, at Dorchester Road and Flatbush Avenue, became the new home of the Van Norman Institute in 1902. The commodious mansion, was situated on ample grounds and was shaded by old trees.

Madame Van Norman retired from the Van Norman Institute in 1906.

== Instruction ==
=== Primary department ===
The aim in this Department was to impart a thorough elementary education. The order of studies included: alphabet, and simple combinations; counting; cultivation of the perceptive powers. The eye to be trained to the ready detection of colors, and to the correct apprehension of magnitudes, forms, and linear measures. The hand to be exercised in delineating on the slate and black-board; and in the use of the needle. Spelling, Reading, Arithmetical Tables. The memory of facts to be cultivated by simple historical narrative, orally communicated by the teacher—to be repeated the following day, in the pupil's own language. Oral lessons in some department of Natural History—to be communicated, and recited as the preceding. Mental Arithmetic; Lessons in Bible Stories of Biography; Geography; Elementary Natural History; Writing; Elementary History of the United States; Defining; Arithmetic; Simple Exercises in English Composition, under the eye of the Teacher; History of the United States. Memoriter recitations of Scripture; and Poetry, adapted to the learner's various stages of development, were required throughout this department; also Singing and Calisthenic exercises. Special and constant efforts was made to cultivate in the pupils habits of distinctness in the articulation, and correctness in the pronunciation and use of words.

=== Academic department ===
Reading; Writing; Arithmetic; Geography; English Grammar; Outlines of General History; Latin; Physiology; Natural History; Plain Geometry; Critical Reading and Analysis of Standard Poets; Analysis of derivative words, Daily Bible Lessons; Memoriter Recitations from Standard Poets; Exercises in English Composition; Singing and Calisthenics throughout this department.

=== Collegiate department ===
- Junior Class: Algebra; Latin; History; Rhetoric; Critical Reading and Analysis of Standard Poets, with Memoritor Recitations; Natural Philosophy; Astronomy; Reading Exercises; English Composition, Bible.
- Middle Class: Chemistry; Physical Geography and Meteorology; Mental Philosophy; Critioal Reading and Analysis of Standard Poets, with Memoriter Recitations; Natural Theology; Logic;. English Composition; History; Latin; Bible.
- Senior Class: Moral Philosophy; History of English Literature; Botany; Geology; Evidences of Christianity; English and Latin Composition; Constitution of the United States; Bible. Vocal Music and Calisthenic exercises continued throughout the course.

=== Electives ===
There were several options for elective classes. These included Greek, French, German, Spanish, and Italian languages; drawing and painting; and vocal and instrumental music.
