= Walter Huston =

Canadian actor and singer (1883–1950)

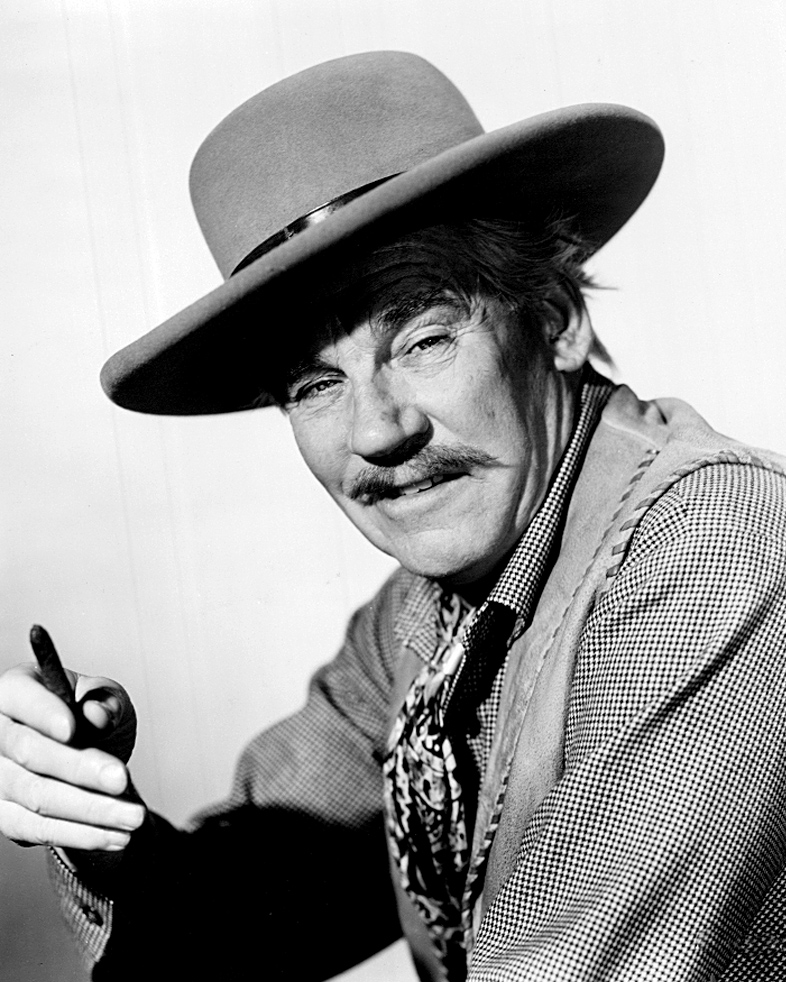
- Huston in The Furies (1950)
- Born: Walter Thomas Huston; April 6, 1883; Toronto, Ontario, Canada
- Died: April 7, 1950 (aged 67); Beverly Hills, California, U.S.
- Occupations: Actor; singer
- Years active: 1902–1950
- Spouses: Rhea Gore (m. 1904; div. 1912) Bayonne Whipple (m. 1914; div. 1931) Ninetta (Nan) Sunderland (m. 1931)
- Children: John Huston
- Relatives: Anjelica Huston (granddaughter); Danny Huston (grandson)

Walter Thomas Huston (/ˈhjuːstən/ HEW-stən; April 6, 1883 or 1884 – April 7, 1950) was a Canadian and American (by naturalization) actor and singer. Huston won the Academy Award for Best Supporting Actor for his role in The Treasure of the Sierra Madre, directed by his son John Huston. He is the patriarch of the four generations of the Huston acting family, including his son John, grandchildren Anjelica Huston and Danny Huston, as well as great-grandchild Jack Huston.

== Early life ==
Huston was born on April 6, 1883, in Toronto, Ontario, where he attended Winchester Street Public School. He was the son of Elizabeth (née McGibbon) and Robert Moore Huston, a farmer who founded a construction company. He was of Scottish and Irish descent. He had a brother and two sisters, one of whom was the theatrical voice coach Margaret Carrington (1877–1941).

His family moved, before his birth, from Melville, just south of Orangeville, Ontario, where they were farmers. As a young man, he worked in construction and in his spare time attended the Shaw School of Acting. He made his stage debut in 1902. He went on to tour in In Convict Stripes, a play by Hal Reid, father of Wallace Reid, and also appeared with Richard Mansfield in Julius Caesar. He again toured in another play, The Sign of the Cross. In 1904, he married Rhea Gore (1882–1938), a sports editor for various publications, and gave up acting to work as a manager of electric power stations in Nevada, Missouri. He maintained these jobs until 1909.

The couple's only child John Huston was born on August 5, 1906, in Nevada, Missouri, at which point Rhea gave up her work to concentrate on motherhood.

== Career ==
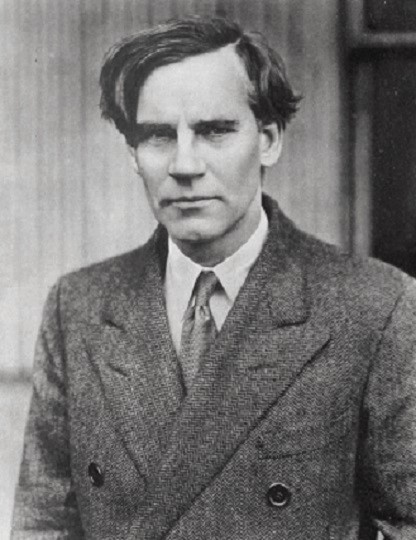
The "first camera study" of Huston for his title role in D. W. Griffith's Abraham Lincoln (1930)

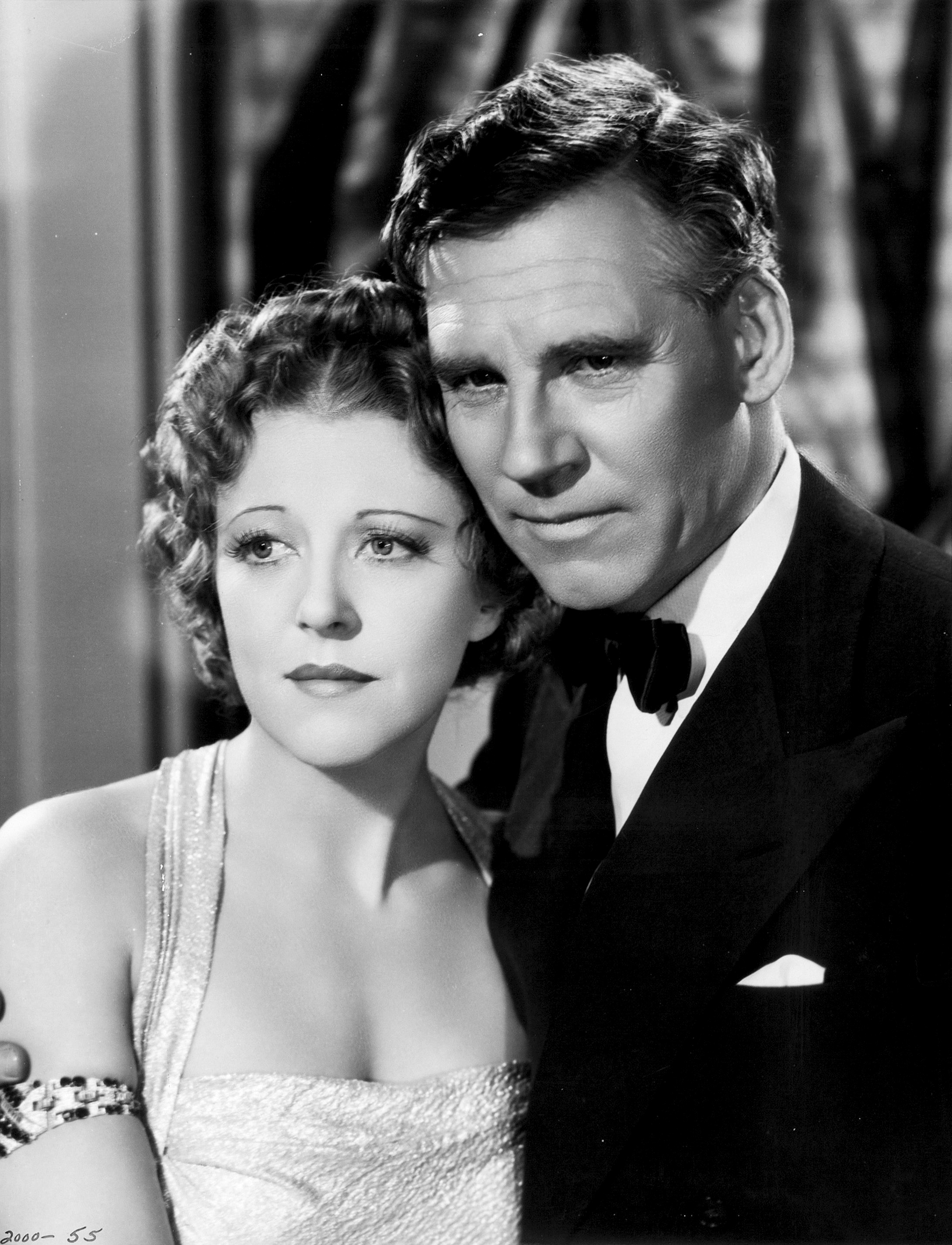
Ruth Chatterton and Huston in Dodsworth (1936)

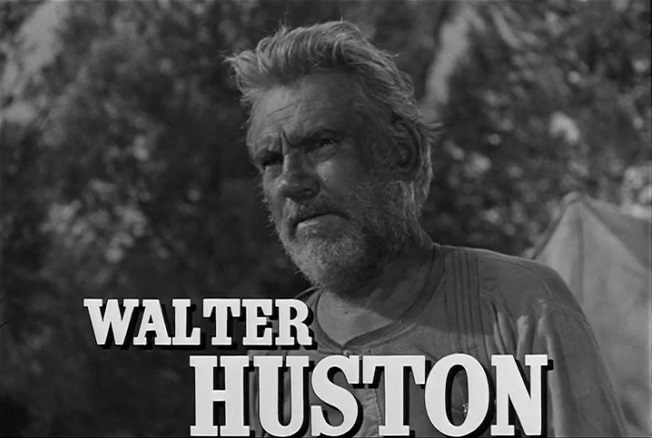
Trailer for The Treasure of the Sierra Madre (1948)

In 1909, with his marriage foundering, he appeared with an older actress named Bayonne Whipple (born Mina Rose, 1865–1937). They were billed as Whipple and Huston.

Walter and Rhea Gore Huston divorced in 1913, and in December 1914, Huston married Mina Rose. Vaudeville was their livelihood into the 1920s, and Walter's son John was sent to live and study in boarding schools. During summer vacations, John traveled separately with each of his parents – with father Walter on vaudeville tours, and with his mother Rhea to horse races and other sports events.

Walter Huston began his Broadway career on January 22, 1924, when he performed there in the play Mr. Pitt. He then solidified his Broadway career with roles in productions such as Desire Under the Elms, Kongo, The Barker, and Elmer the Great.

Once talkies began in Hollywood, he was cast in both character roles and as a leading man. His first major role was portraying the villainous Trampas in The Virginian (1929), a Western that costars Gary Cooper and Richard Arlen. Some of Huston's other early sound roles include Abraham Lincoln (1930), Rain (1932), and Gabriel Over the White House (1933).

The career of Mina Rose (a.k.a. Bayonne Whipple) did not follow the same trajectory as Huston's, and their act -- and marriage -- collapsed after Huston began to accept solo work. After several years of separation, the two divorced in 1931. Huston remarried that same year, to Ninetta (Nan) Sunderland, and the two remained married until Huston's death.

Huston remained busy on stage and screen throughout the 1930s and 1940s, becoming during that period one of America's most prominent actors. He starred as the title character in the 1934 Broadway adaptation of Sinclair Lewis's novel Dodsworth as well as in the play's film version released two years later. For his role as Sam Dodsworth, Huston won the New York Film Critics Circle Award for Best Actor and was Oscar nominated. He performed "September Song" in the original Broadway production of Knickerbocker Holiday (1938). Huston's recording of "September Song" is heard repeatedly in September Affair (1950).

Huston makes an uncredited appearance in the 1941 film noir classic The Maltese Falcon, portraying the ship's captain who is shot just before delivering the black bird to Sam Spade, played by Humphrey Bogart. Walter's son, John Huston, directed the picture. As a practical joke during filming, John had his father enter the scene and die in more than 10 different takes.

Among several of his contributions to World War II Allied propaganda films, Huston in an uncredited role portrays a military instructor in the short Safeguarding Military Information (1942). That film was produced by the Academy of Motion Picture Arts and Sciences and distributed by the War Activities Committee of the Motion Pictures Industry. He, along with Anthony Veiller, is also a narrator in the Why We Fight series of World War II documentaries directed by Frank Capra. Other films of this period in which he appears are The Devil and Daniel Webster (1941) as Mr. Scratch, Yankee Doodle Dandy (1942), and Mission to Moscow (1943). In the latter feature, a pro-Soviet World War II propaganda film, he plays United States Ambassador Joseph E. Davies.

Huston portrays the character Howard in the 1948 adventure drama The Treasure of the Sierra Madre, which was also directed by his son John. Based on the mysterious B. Traven's novel, the film depicts the story of three gold prospectors in 1920s post-revolution Mexico. Walter Huston won the Golden Globe Award and the Academy Award for Best Supporting Actor for the film, while John Huston won the Best Director Academy Award, thus making them the first father and son to win at the same ceremony. His last film is The Furies (1950) in which he costars with Barbara Stanwyck and Wendell Corey. In that Western, Huston's final line is "There will never be another one like me."

== Death ==
On April 7, 1950, Huston died of an aortic aneurysm in his hotel suite in Beverly Hills one day after his birthday. He was cremated.

== Legacy ==
In 1960, a decade after his death, Huston received a star on the Hollywood Walk of Fame at 6624 Hollywood Boulevard, memorializing his contributions to the entertainment industry through his extensive, critically acclaimed work in motion pictures. He was also a member of the American Theater Hall of Fame.

In 1998, Scarecrow Press published John Weld's September Song—An Intimate Biography of Walter Huston.

== Filmography ==
Year	Title	Role	Notes
1929	Gentlemen of the Press	Wickland Snell	Film debut
1929	The Lady Lies	Robert Rossiter	
1929	The Virginian	Trampas	
1930	Behind the Make-Up	Joe in Clark & White's Office	Uncredited
1930	Abraham Lincoln	Abraham Lincoln	
1930	The Bad Man	Pancho Lopez	
1930	The Virtuous Sin	Gen. Gregori Platoff	
1931	The Criminal Code	Mark Brady	
1931	The Star Witness	District Attorney Whitlock	
1931	The Ruling Voice	Jack Bannister	
1931	A House Divided	Seth Law	
1932	The Woman from Monte Carlo	Captain Carlaix	
1932	The Beast of the City	Jim Fitzpatrick	
1932	Law and Order	Frame "Saint" Johnson	
1932	The Wet Parade	Pow Tarleton	
1932	Night Court	Judge Andrew J. Moffett	
1932	American Madness	Thomas A. Dickson	
1932	Kongo	Flint Rutledge	
1932	Rain	Alfred Davidson	
1933	Gabriel Over the White House	Hon. Judson Hammond	
1933	Hell Below	Lieut. Comdr. T.J. Toler USN	
1933	Storm at Daybreak	Mayor Dushan Radovic	
1933	Ann Vickers	Judge Barney "Barney" Dolphin	
1933	The Prizefighter and the Lady	Professor Edwin J. Bennett	
1934	Keep 'Em Rolling	Sgt. Benjamin E. 'Benny' Walsh	
1935	Trans-Atlantic Tunnel	President of the United States	
1936	Rhodes of Africa	Cecil John Rhodes	
1936	Dodsworth	Sam Dodsworth	New York Film Critics Circle Award for Best Actor; Nominated for the Academy Award for Best Actor
1938	Of Human Hearts	Ethan Wilkins	
1939	The Light That Failed	Torpenhow	
1941	The Maltese Falcon	Captain Jacoby	Uncredited
1941	The Devil and Daniel Webster	Mr. Scratch	Alternative title: All That Money Can Buy; Nominated for the Academy Award for Best Actor
1941	Swamp Water	Thursday Ragan	
1941	The Shanghai Gesture	Sir Guy Charteris	
1942	Always In My Heart	MacKenzie "Mac" Scott	
1942	In This Our Life	Bartender	Uncredited
1942	Yankee Doodle Dandy	Jerry Cohan	Nominated for the Academy Award for Best Supporting Actor
1943	December 7th	Uncle Sam	
1943	The Outlaw	Doc Holliday	
1943	Edge of Darkness	Dr. Martin Stensgard	
1943	Mission to Moscow	Ambassador Joseph E. Davies	
1943	The North Star	Dr. Kurin	
1944	Dragon Seed	Ling Tan	
1945	And Then There Were None	Dr. Edward G. Armstrong	
1946	Dragonwyck	Ephraim Wells	
1946	Duel in the Sun	The Sinkiller	
1946	Let There Be Light	Narrator	
1948	The Treasure of the Sierra Madre	Howard	Academy Award for Best Supporting Actor; Golden Globe Award for Best Supporting Actor - Motion Picture; National Board of Review Award for Best Actor; New York Film Critics Circle Award for Best Actor (2nd place)
1948	Summer Holiday	Mr. Nat Miller	
1949	The Great Sinner	General Ostrovsky	
1950	The Furies	T.C. Jeffords	Released posthumously

== See also ==
- Canadian pioneers in early Hollywood
- List of actors with Academy Award nominations
