= Bayonne Whipple =

American actress and vaudeville performer

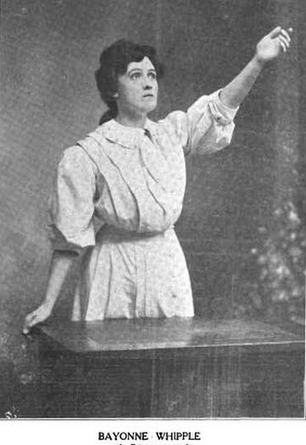
Bayonne Whipple from a 1908 publication

Fanny Elmina Rose (died February 20, 1937), known professionally as Bayonne Whipple, was an actress and vaudeville performer and the second wife of Canadian actor Walter Huston.

== Early life ==
Fanny Elmina Rose (called Mina) was born in New York, the daughter of Rodney S. Rose and Mary Louisa (née Ward) Rose. Her father was a Methodist Episcopal clergyman.

== Career ==
Bayonne Whipple was a vaudeville performer. From 1902 to 1908, she was the heroine Ruth Blak in a stage melodrama titled The Ninety and Nine in New York. In 1909, she met and began working with Walter Huston, a younger actor. At the time, she was headlining a touring act named Harmony Discord. They formed an act named Whipple and Huston that toured for 15 years. "We sang, danced, did comedy skits," Huston recalled, "and managements soon found out that we could do the time on stage of three acts, so they hired us, so they wouldn't have to pay the salaries of the two acts we replaced." Whipple handled the business side of their work, Huston wrote their material, and Whipple was credited as co-writer of some songs and skits during this period. Their act was successful, but ended as Huston's career in theatre and film grew, and Whipple's did not.

== Personal life ==
Bayonne Whipple married Walter Huston as his second wife in December 1914 in Arkansas; after years of separation, they divorced in 1931. Walter soon remarried. She died at home on Balboa Island, California in 1937, from heart disease. Reports of her age varied; she may have been as young as 60 or as old as 72 at the time of her death. Her gravesite is in Candor, New York.
