= Harry Chapin discography =

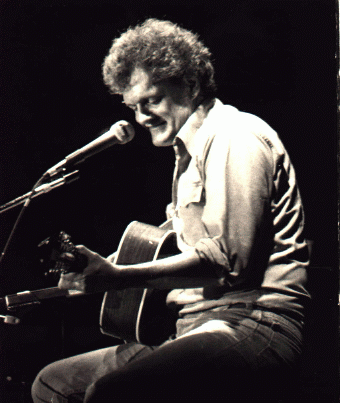
- Studio albums: 9
- Live albums: 2
- Compilation albums: 14
- Singles: 13

This page is a discography for the singer and songwriter Harry Chapin. Chapin was a popular singer-songwriter in the 1970s and 1980s, achieving international success. Chapin's career was cut short at its peak, when he was killed in a car accident in 1981. He is best remembered for the song "Cat's in the Cradle," which hit number one on the Billboard Hot 100 in 1974.

== Albums ==
=== Studio albums ===
Title	Album details	Peak chart positions			Sales	Certifications
Title	Album details	US	AUS	CAN	Sales	Certifications
Heads & Tales	Released: March 11, 1972; Label: Elektra Records	60	36	57	1,100,000	RIAA: Gold
Sniper and Other Love Songs	Released: October 1972; Label: Elektra Records	160	—	—	350,000	
Short Stories	Released: December 1, 1973; Label: Elektra Records	61	46	39	1,100,000	
Verities & Balderdash	Released: August 24, 1974; Label: Elektra Records	4	15	4	2,700,000	RIAA: 2× Platinum
Portrait Gallery	Released: September 27, 1975; Label: Elektra Records	53	88	—	350,000	
On the Road to Kingdom Come	Released: October 23, 1976; Label: Elektra Records	87	95	66	350,000	
Dance Band on the Titanic	Released: September 10, 1977; Label: Elektra Records	58	—	91	500,000	
Living Room Suite	Released: September 10, 1978; Label: Elektra Records	133	—	—	350,000	
Sequel	Released: March, 1980; Label: Boardwalk Records	58	42	72	500,000	"—" denotes releases that did not chart or were not released in that territory.

=== Live albums ===
Title	Album details	Peak chart positions			Sales	Certifications
Title	Album details	US	AUS	CAN	Sales	Certifications
Greatest Stories Live	Released: April 23, 1976; Label: Elektra Records	48	—	71	2,100,000	RIAA: 2× Platinum; MC: Gold
Legends of the Lost and Found	Released: November, 1979; Label: Elektra Records	163	72	64	250,000	
"—" denotes releases that did not chart or were not released in that territory.

=== Compilation and specialty albums ===
Title	Album details	Sales	Certifications
Anthology of Harry Chapin	Released: 1985; Label: Elektra Records	250,000	
Remember When the Music	Released: 1987; Label: Dunhill Compact Classics	250,000	
The Gold Medal Collection	Released: September 13, 1988; Label: Elektra Records	1,000,000	RIAA: Platinum
The Last Protest Singer	Released: November 30, 1988; Label: DCC Compact Classics	250,000	
Harry Chapin Tribute	Released: July 1, 1990; Label: Relativity Records		
The Bottom Line Encore Collection	Released: March 10, 1998; Label: The Bottom Line Record Company		
Story of a Life	Released: October 19, 1999; Label: Elektra Records		
Storyteller	Released: 1999; Label: BOA Records		
Onwards and Upwards	Released: 2000; Label: Harry Chapin Foundation		
VH1 Behind the Music: The Harry Chapin Collection	Released: August 21, 2001; Label: Elektra Records		
The Essentials	Released: July 2, 2002; Label: Elektra Records		
Classics	Released: 2003; Label: Warner Special Products		
Introducing... Harry Chapin	Released: August 1, 2006; Label: Rhino/Atlantic Records		
Bottom Line Archive Series: Live 1981	Released: June 30, 2015; Label: The Bottom Line Record Company		
The Singles A's & B's	Released: March 1, 2019; Label: Wounded Bird Records		

=== Other appearances ===
- Chapin Music! (1966, Rock-Land Records) – by The Chapin Brothers (Harry, Tom and Steve along with their father Jim)

== Singles ==
Title	Year	Peak chart positions									Certifications	Album
Title	Year	US	US AC	US Cash	AUS	CAN	CAN AC	IRE	NZ	UK	Certifications	Album
"Taxi"	1972	24	—	20	30	5	—	—	19	—		Heads & Tales
"Could You Put Your Light On, Please"	1972	—	—	81	—	76	—	—	—	—		Heads & Tales
"Sunday Morning Sunshine"	1972	75	30	77	—	68	—	—	—	—		Sniper and Other Love Songs
"Better Place to Be"	1972	—	—	—	—	—	51	—	—	—		Sniper and Other Love Songs
"W.O.L.D."	1973	36	37	26	21	14	9	—	16	34		Short Stories
"What Made America Famous?"		—	—	87	—	—	—	—	—	—		Verities & Balderdash
"I Wanna Learn a Love Song"	1974	44	7	40	—	36	14	—	—	—		Verities & Balderdash
"Cat's in the Cradle"	1974	1	6	1	6	3	1	—	—	53 (Note: Chart position is from the official UK "Breakers List".)	RIAA: Platinum	Verities & Balderdash
"Dreams Go By"	1975	—	33	—	81	—	31	—	—	—		Portrait Gallery
"A Better Place to Be" (live)	1976	86	—	76	—	80	—	—	—	—		Greatest Stories Live
"Dance Band on the Titanic"	1977	—	—	—	87	—	—	—	—	—		Dance Band on the Titanic
"Flowers Are Red"	1978	—	—	—	—	—	—	19	—	—		Living Room Suite
"Sequel"	1980	23	37	34	—	—	—	—	—	—	RIAA: Platinum	Sequel
"Remember When The Music"	1980	—	47	—	—	—	—	—	—	—		Sequel
"Story of a Life"	1980	—	—	—	—	—	—	—	—	—		Sequel
"—" denotes releases that did not chart or were not released in that territory.

== Videos ==
- An Evening With... Harry Chapin (1998)
- Rockpalast Live (2002)
- Remember When: The Anthology (2005)
- You Are the Only Song (2006)

== TV appearances and credits ==
Harry Chapin was featured on several TV shows throughout his career, most notably "The Tonight Show Starring Johnny Carson." He appeared 14 times. He made history as the first performer to be called back the next night to perform again on the show. This was due to his singing "Taxi" in 1972.

He became friends with fellow songwriter John Denver, often appearing on TV with him. Denver hosted the pilot episode of The Midnight Special in which Harry was one of the first performers on the show.

The following are all the currently known TV shows and movies Harry Chapin appeared in or had songwriting credits on:

- 15th Annual Grammy Awards
- 17th Annual Grammy Awards
- 20 to One
- American Bandstand
- Behind the Music
- Blue Water White Death
- Book of Chapin
- Cutting Loose
- Cotton Patch Gospel
- Cougar Town
- De Mike Burstyn Show
- Dick Cavett Show
- Dinah!
- Don Kirshner's Rock Concert
- Duel in the Wind: In Defense of America's Cup
- Friday Night, Saturday Morning
- Friday Night With Steve Edwards
- Get a Life
- Gilmore Girls: A Year in the Life
- It's Always Sunny in Philadelphia
- Goodnight America
- Grand Theft Auto V
- Happy Endings
- Harry Chapin: The Final Concert
- Harry Chapin Tribute
- How I Met Your Mother
- Last Vegas
- Legendary Champions
- Let's Sing Out
- Make a Wish
- Merv Griffin Show
- Mike Douglas Show
- Modern Family
- Mother and Daughter: The Loving War
- Mr. Jealousy
- My Music
- Mystery Science Theater 3000
- Remember When: The Anthology
- Robot Chicken
- Rock Music Awards
- Rockpalast
- Rude(ish) Tube
- Saturday Night Live
- Scrubs
- Shrek the Third
- Solid Gold
- Soundstage
- That '70s Show
- The Circle (1972)
- The David Frost Show
- The Ernie Sigley Show
- The Goldbergs
- The Jim Nabors Show
- The Midnight Special
- The N.S.V.I.P.'s
- The Office
- The Simpsons
- There's a Lotta Lonely People Tonight
- 'Til Death
- Welcome to the Basement
- Wonderama
