= The Gold Medal Collection =

Compilation album by Harry Chapin
- Released: September 13, 1988
- Genre: Folk rock
- Length: 2:20:13
- Label: Elektra
- Producer: Sandy Chapin & Charles J. Sanders

Harry Chapin chronology
Remember When the Music (1987)	The Gold Medal Collection (1988)	The Last Protest Singer (1998)

Professional ratings
Review scores
Source	Rating
Allmusic	3/5 stars

The Gold Medal Collection is a 1988 two-CD compilation album featuring various songs and interviews by singer-songwriter Harry Chapin. It was released by Elektra Records to commemorate Chapin for being posthumously awarded the Congressional Gold Medal for his humanitarian work and campaigns to end hunger. The album has been certified platinum by the RIAA and has sold over 1 million copies.

== Track listing ==
Disc 1 (1:08:22):

1. "Taxi" - 6:44 (From the album Heads & Tales)
2. "Sunday Morning Sunshine" - 3:30 (From the album Sniper and Other Love Songs)
3. "Old College Avenue" - 4:25 (From the album Short Stories)
4. "Dirty Old Man" - 1:25 (From The Tonight Show, NBC, December 20, 1977)
5. "I Wanna Learn a Love Song" - 4:19 (From the album Verities and Balderdash)
6. "Cat's in the Cradle" - 3:44 (From the album Verities and Balderdash)
7. "Tangled Up Puppet" - 3:42 (From the album Portrait Gallery)
8. "Dancing Boy" - 3:40 (From the album Living Room Suite)
9. "Thanksgiving Hunger Drives" - 0:47 (From a speech before the Michigan League on World Hunger Year, April 1, 1980)
10. "Flowers Are Red" (Live) - 5:01 (From the album Legends of the Lost and Found)
11. "She Sings Songs Without Words" - 3:31 (From the album Verities and Balderdash)
12. "Shooting Star" - 4:02 (From the album Verities and Balderdash)
13. "Winter Song" - 2:30 (From the album Sniper and Other Love Songs)
14. "Story of a Life" - 5:15 (From the album Sequel)
15. "Commitment and Pete Seeger" - 1:47 (From an interview with Bill Ayres WPLJ Radio, New York City, November, 1980)
16. "There Only Was One Choice" - 14:00 (From the album Dance Band on the Titanic)

Disc 2 (1:11:51):

1. "A Better Place to Be" - 7:35 (From the album Sniper and Other Love Songs)
2. "Mail Order Annie" - 4:52 (From the album Short Stories)
3. "Performing" - 0:30 (From an interview on Winnipeg Today, VPW-TV Winnipeg, March 27, 1981)
4. "W*O*L*D" (Live) - 4:46 (From the album Greatest Stories Live)
5. "Mr. Tanner" (Live) - 4:45 (From the album Greatest Stories Live)
6. "Corey's Coming" - 5:38 (From the album On the Road to Kingdom Come)
7. "A Child Is Born" - 0:30 (From a speech before the Michigan League on World Hunger Year, April 1, 1980)
8. "Sniper" - 9:50 (From the album Sniper and Other Love Songs)
9. "Calluses" - 0:41 (From Harry Chapin on Hunger)
10. "The Rock" - 4:15 (From the album Portrait Gallery)
11. "Dance Band on the Titanic" - 5:11 (From the album Dance Band on the Titanic)
12. "I Wonder What Would Happen to This World" - 3:28 (From the album Living Room Suite)
13. "Sequel" - 6:35 (From the album Sequel)
14. "My Grandfather" - 1:45 (From a speech before the ACUAA, December 22, '80)
15. "Remember When the Music (Reprise)" - 3:50 (From the album Sequel)
16. "Circle" (Live) - 7:30 (Broadcast on WNEW-FM Live from the Bottom Line, New York City, 1981)
