= The Essentials (Harry Chapin album) =

Posthumous compilation album of Harry Chapin

Compilation album by Harry Chapin
- Released: July 2, 2002
- Genre: Pop rock
- Length: 1:13:52
- Label: Elektra
- Producer: David McLees

Harry Chapin chronology
VH1 Behind the Music: The Harry Chapin Collection (2001)	The Essentials (2002)	Classic Hits of Harry Chapin (2003)

The Essentials is a posthumously produced compilation album by the American singer-songwriter Harry Chapin. It was released in 2002 containing a few of Chapin's hits.

== Reception ==
Professional ratings
Review scores
Source	Rating
AllMusic	4.5/5 stars

Heather Phares praises the album saying, "The Essentials more or less lives up to its name, gathering a dozen definitive Harry Chapin songs" and concluding that the set "offers a decent primer of Chapin's best-known work."

== Track listing ==
No.	Title	Length
1.	"Taxi"	6:43
2.	"Sunday Morning Sunshine"	3:43
3.	"W*O*L*D*"	5:12
4.	"Cat's in the Cradle"	3:48
5.	"I Wanna Learn a Love Song"	4:24
6.	"A Better Place to Be"	8:35
7.	"Dreams Go By"	3:43
8.	"Sniper"	9:57
9.	"30,000 Pounds of Bananas"	10:58
10.	"Dance Band on the Titanic"	5:11
11.	"Sequel"	6:39
12.	"Remember When the Music (reprise)"	3:54

== Personnel ==
- Harry Chapin – vocals
