= Story of a Life =

Compilation album by Harry Chapin
- Released: October 19, 1999
- Genre: Pop rock
- Length: 3:53:32
- Label: Elektra
- Producer: Mike Ragogna & David McLees

Harry Chapin chronology
| The Bottom Line Encore Collection (1998) | Story of a Life (1999) | Storyteller (1999) |

Professional ratings
Review scores
| Source | Rating |
|---|---|
| AllMusic | 4/5 stars |

Story of a Life is the third posthumous compilation album released featuring Harry Chapin, released in 1999 (see 1999 in music). It was released as a box set containing 3 CDs and a 76-page booklet.

== Track listing ==
Disc 1 (1:16:59):

1. "Taxi" – 6:42
2. "Someone Keeps Callin' My Name" – 2:53
3. "Could You Put Your Light On, Please" – 4:30
4. "Empty" – 2:58
5. "Greyhound" – 5:39
6. "Any Old Kind of Day" – 4:45
7. "Sunday Morning Sunshine" – 3:50
8. "Sniper" – 9:57
9. "Better Place to Be" – 8:35
10. "They Call Her Easy" – 4:03
11. "Mr. Tanner" – 5:12
12. "Mail Order Annie" – 4:54
13. "W*O*L*D" – 5:12
14. "Old College Avenue" – 4:27
15. "Circle" – 3:22

Disc 2 (1:18:07):

1. "Short Stories" – 4:35
2. "Cat's in the Cradle" – 3:48
3. "I Wanna Learn a Love Song" – 4:24
4. "30,000 Pounds of Bananas (Live)" – 10:58
5. "Shooting Star" – 4:06
6. "What Made America Famous?" – 6:52
7. "Vacancy" – 4:01
8. "Dreams Go By" – 4:43
9. "Tangled Up Puppet" – 3:42
10. "The Rock" – 4:12
11. "She is Always Seventeen" – 4:18
12. "The Mayor of Candor Lied" – 8:21
13. "Caroline" – 3:40
14. "Laugh Man" – 3:35
15. "Taxi (Live)" – 6:52

Disc 3 (1:18:26):

1. "Corey's Coming" – 5:38
2. "If My Mary Were Here" – 3:26
3. "Dance Band on the Titanic" – 5:11
4. "Mismatch" – 4:55
5. "I Wonder What Happened to Him" – 4:09
6. "Dancin' Boy" – 3:52
7. "Flowers Are Red (Live)" – 5:07
8. "Poor Damned Fool" – 4:34
9. "Jenny" – 4:47
10. "I Wonder What Would Happen to This World" – 3:29
11. "Old Folkie (Live)" – 5:02
12. "Remember When the Music (Reprise)" – 3:56
13. "God Babe, You've Been Good for Me" – 3:23
14. "Story of a Life" – 5:21
15. "November Rains" – 3:50
16. "Sequel" – 6:40
17. "Last Stand" – 5:06

== Personnel ==
- Harry Chapin – guitar, vocals
- Clair Marlo – Producer, arranger, synthesizer
- Tom Chapin – guitar
- Grant Geissman – guitar
- Jon Corbert – piano
- Steve Chapin – piano
- Pat Coil – piano
- Bill Lanphier – bass guitar
- John Wallace – bass guitar
- Howie Fields – drums and percussion
- M. B. Gordy – drums and percussion
- Doug Walker – electric guitar
- Jon Corbert – synthesizer
