= VH1 Behind the Music: The Harry Chapin Collection =

Posthumous 2001 compilation album by Harry Chapin

Compilation album by Harry Chapin
- Released: 2001
- Genre: Pop rock
- Length: 1:16:04
- Label: Elektra Records
- Producer: Bill Inglot

Harry Chapin chronology
Onwards and Upwards (2000)	VH1 Behind the Music: The Harry Chapin Collection (2001)	The Essentials (2002)

VH1 Behind the Music: The Harry Chapin Collection is a posthumously produced compilation album by the American singer-songwriter Harry Chapin. It was released in 2001 for the TV series, Behind the Music. The album features some of Chapin's biggest hit singles.

== Behind the Music ==
Behind the Music, a TV series airing on VH1, compiled all of the songs into the life story of Chapin. Some songs are live versions with videos.

== Reception ==
Professional ratings
Review scores
Source	Rating
AllMusic	4/5 stars

Stephen Thomas Erlewine warns that "Chapin's work can seem strident and didactic" but calls this collection "a very good compilation of his greatest moments" and "better balanced than a lot of hits compilations".

== Track listing ==
No.	Title	Length
1.	"Taxi"	6:38
2.	"I Wanna Learn a Love Song"	4:23
3.	"Cat's in the Cradle"	3:47
4.	"Sunday Morning Sunshine"	3:47
5.	"A Better Place to Be"	8:34
6.	"Sequel"	6:39
7.	"Circle"	3:22
8.	"W*O*L*D*"	5:08
9.	"Corey's Coming"	5:36
10.	"If My Mary Were Here"	3:25
11.	"Sniper"	9:56
12.	"Remember When the Music (Reprise)"	3:53
13.	"30,000 Pounds of Bananas"	10:56
