= Remember When: The Anthology =

Video by Harry Chapin
- Released: November 22, 2005
- Recorded: Various
- Genre: Folk; Folk rock Singer-songwriter
- Length: 1:07:17
- Label: TH Entertainment, LLC
- Producer: Gregory Hall, Corridor Group Productions, Inc.

Harry Chapin chronology
Rockpalast Live (2002)	Remember When: The Anthology (2005)	You Are the Only Song (2006)

Remember When: The Anthology is a DVD featuring a collection of live performances by Harry Chapin. It features commentary by his children Joshua and Jennifer, as well as his widow Sandy in between some performances. There are eleven performances by Harry, and one by his daughter, Jennifer (I Wonder What Would Happen to This World).

== Track listing ==
1. "Taxi"
2. "Mr. Tanner"
3. "I Wanna Learn a Love Song"
4. "Remember When the Music"
5. "W.O.L.D."
6. "Story of a Life"
7. "Cat's in the Cradle"
8. "Circle"

== DVD Bonus Features ==
1. "Song for Myself" – 4:56
2. "Dancin' Boy" – 4:47
3. "Better Place to Be" – 13:10
4. "I Wonder What Would Happen to This World" – 4:25 (Performed by Jen Chapin)
