= The Bottom Line Encore Collection =

- Front Cover

Live album by Harry Chapin
- Released: March 10, 1998
- Recorded: January 1981
- Genre: Folk rock
- Length: 97:40
- Label: The Bottom Line Record Company
- Producer: Peter Fornatale, Hank Medress

Harry Chapin chronology
Harry Chapin Tribute (1990)	The Bottom Line Encore Collection (1998)	Story of a Life (1999)

Professional ratings
Review scores
Source	Rating
Allmusic	link

The Bottom Line Encore Collection is the fourth live album by Harry Chapin, released in 1998 (see 1998 in music) as a two-CD compilation. It was recorded at the Village in New York, and was Harry's two-thousandth concert. The setlist was composed of songs throughout Harry's music career (1972–1981).

== Track listing ==
Disc 1:

1. "Taxi" - 6:52
2. "Story of a Life" - 5:21
3. "I Miss America" - 6:56
4. "Mercenaries" - 6:04
5. "A Better Place to Be" - 9:16
6. "I Wanna Learn a Love Song" - 4:24
7. "Mr. Tanner" - 6:55
8. "W*O*L*D" - 4:54

Disc 2:

1. "Cat's in the Cradle" - 3:51
2. "Mismatch" - 4:10
3. "Old Folkie" - 5:33
4. "Let Time Go Lightly" - 4:41
5. "Remember When the Music" - 8:45
6. "30,000 Pounds of Bananas" - 12:48
7. "Sequel" - 7:11

== Personnel ==
- Harry Chapin - guitar, vocals
- Steve Chapin - keyboards
- John Wallace - bass
- Dougie Walker - lead guitar
- Howie Fields - drums
- Yvonne Cable - cello
