= Greatest Stories Live =

Live album by Harry Chapin
- Released: April 23, 1976
- Recorded: November 7, 1975 (San Diego Civic Theatre); November 8, 1975 (Santa Monica Civic Auditorium); November 9, 1975 (Berkeley Community Theatre)
- Genres: Pop, rock
- Length: 70:32
- Label: Elektra
- Producers: Stephen Chapin, Fred Kewley, Paul Leka

Harry Chapin chronology
Portrait Gallery (1975)	Greatest Stories Live (1976)	On the Road to Kingdom Come (1976)

Professional ratings
Review scores
Source	Rating
Allmusic	3/5 stars

Greatest Stories Live is a 1976 live album by the American singer-songwriter Harry Chapin. It was recorded over three nights at three California venues in November 1975. Certain elements had to be re-recorded in the studio due to technical problems with the live recordings. The original LP release featured three new studio tracks, two of which ("She Is Always Seventeen" and "Love Is Just Another Word") were excluded from the CD release. "A Better Place to Be" was released as a single which peaked at number 83 on the Billboard Hot 100 in July 1976.

The album is notable for its extended version of "30,000 Pounds of Bananas", infamous for Chapin's recounting of his brothers' remarks after hearing the original ending: "Harry...it sucks." The quote became so popular with Harry Chapin fans that concert shirts were sold with the quotation on it.

== Track listing (CD release) ==
No.	Title	Length
1.	"Dreams Go By"	4:54
2.	"W·O·L·D"	5:04
3.	"Saturday Morning (Tom Chapin)"	3:05
4.	"I Wanna Learn a Love Song"	5:04
5.	"Mr. Tanner"	5:17
6.	"A Better Place to Be"	9:17
7.	"Let Time Go Lightly (Steve Chapin)"	4:56
8.	"Cat's in the Cradle"	4:04
9.	"Taxi"	6:53
10.	"Circle"	7:21
11.	"30,000 Pounds of Bananas (Extended with two alternate endings)"	11:28
12.	"The Shortest Story (Studio track)"	2:25

- "She Is Always Seventeen" and "Love Is Just Another Word" appear between "30,000 Pounds of Bananas" and "The Shortest Story" on side 4 of the original 1976 vinyl release as well as on the cassette release. Those tracks were studio tracks recorded in the Summer of 1975, as was "The Shortest Story"

== Personnel ==
- Harry Chapin – guitar, vocals
- Ron Bacchiocchi – synthesizer, percussion, clavinet
- Ed Bednarski – clarinet
- Stephen Chapin – synthesizer, piano, vocals
- Tom Chapin – guitar, banjo, vocals
- Christine Faith – vocals
- Cheryl Ferrio – vocals
- Howie Fields – drums
- David Kondziela – vocals
- Paul Leka – piano, clavinet
- Michael Masters – cello
- Tim Moore – piano
- Mark Mundy – vocals
- Ronald Palmer – guitar, vocals
- Don Payne – bass
- Kathy Ramos – vocals
- Tim Scott – cello
- Allan Schwartzberg – drums
- Frank Simms – vocals
- George Simms – vocals
- Ken Smith – percussion
- Bob Springer – percussion
- John Tropea – guitar
- Betsy Wager – vocals
- Doug Walker – bass, guitar, vocals
- John Wallace – bass, vocals
- Sue White – vocals
- Christopher von Koschembahr – vocals

== Charts and certifications ==
=== Charts ===
Year	Chart	Position
1976	Billboard 200	48
1976	Canadian Albums Chart	71

=== Certifications ===
Region	Certification	Sales
United States	2× Platinum	2,000,000
Canada	Platinum	100,000
