= Harry Chapin Tribute =

Live album by Harry Chapin
- Released: July 1, 1990
- Recorded: December 7, 1987
- Genre: Singer-songwriter
- Length: 1:01:24
- Label: Relativity
- Producer: Stephen Chapin

Harry Chapin chronology
The Last Protest Singer (1988)	Harry Chapin Tribute (1990)	The Bottom Line Encore Collection (1998)

Professional ratings
Review scores
Source	Rating
Allmusic	2/5 stars

Harry Chapin Tribute is a CD of a tribute concert held at the Carnegie Hall in 1987 to commemorate Harry Chapin's 45th birthday if he were alive, and also to award him the Congressional Gold Medal which was presented to his son Joshua Chapin and laid on an empty stool with Harry's guitar leaning against it. Various artists contributed, including Bruce Springsteen, Richie Havens, and Pat Benatar, whom Harry taught to sing rock and roll. It was hosted by Harry Belafonte.

== Track listing ==
No.	Title	Artist	Length
1.	"Circle"	Oscar Brand, Pete Seeger, Steve Chapin and Tom Chapin	3:58
2.	"Sandy"	Graham Nash	3:41
3.	"Cat's in the Cradle"	Judy Collins	4:56
4.	"W*O*L*D"	Richie Havens, Tom Chapin and Steve Chapin	5:46
5.	"Six String Orchestra"	The Smothers Brothers	7:01
6.	"When I Look Up"	Dolores Hall	5:12
7.	"Remember When the Music"	Bruce Springsteen	7:05
8.	"Tangled Up Puppet"	Terry Klausner	4:42
9.	"One Light in a Dark Valley"	The Hooters	4:17
10.	"Shooting Star"	Pat Benatar	5:48
11.	"Last Stand"	John Wallace	3:54
12.	"Circle Reprise"	Concert staff, including Peter, Paul and Mary	5:04
