= Sequel (album) =

Studio album by Harry Chapin
- Released: March 1980
- Recorded: 1980
- Genre: Pop rock
- Label: Boardwalk
- Producer: Howard Albert; Ron Albert

Harry Chapin chronology
Legends of the Lost and Found (1979)	Sequel (1980)	The Last Protest Singer (1987)

Singles from Sequel
- 1. "Sequel" Released: October 1980

Sequel is the ninth studio album by the American singer-songwriter Harry Chapin, released in 1980 (see 1980 in music). It was the last complete album released during Harry's lifetime. A tenth studio album, The Last Protest Singer, made up of material he was working on at the time of his death, was released about six years after he died.

The title song reports further events in the lives of Harry and Sue, the characters in Chapin's hit song "Taxi", and peaked at No. 23 on the Billboard Hot 100 chart (the original went to No. 24). A follow-up single, "Story of a Life", failed to reach the Hot 100 chart (peaking at No. 105), but is historic as it was Chapin's final 45.

The album was re-released under the title Remember When the Music with the addition of two previously unreleased tracks. It was re-released with only the original ten tracks as Storyteller in 1999. It was also remastered in 2001 with four additional tracks.

== Critical reception ==
Professional ratings
Review scores
Source	Rating
AllMusic	2/5 stars

The Boston Globe wrote that "the album is bogged down in gushing sentimentality, and is ultimately 44 minutes, 35 seconds of maudlin musical waste."

== Track listing ==
Side one
No.	Title	Length
1.	"Sequel"	6:40
2.	"I Miss America"	5:19
3.	"Story of a Life"	5:24
4.	"Remember When the Music"	3:56

Side two
No.	Title	Length
1.	"Up on the Shelf"	3:58
2.	"Salt and Pepper"	4:12
3.	"God Babe, You've Been Good for Me"	3:22
4.	"Northwest 222"	3:47
5.	"I Finally Found It Sandy"	4:42
6.	"Remember When the Music (Reprise)"	3:59
7.	"Sequel (Album Version, Gehman Mix)"	8:30 *
8.	"Remember When the Music (Extended Version)"	4:19 *
9.	"Story of a Life (Alternate Version)"	5:38 *
10.	"Sequel (Alternate Mix)"	6:34 *

- Tracks 7–10 on side two are bonus tracks on the 2001 remastered edition

== Charts ==
Year	Chart	Position
1981	Australian (Kent Music Report)	42

== Personnel ==
- Harry Chapin – guitar, vocals
- Howard Albert – synthesizer
- Yvonne Cable – cello
- Charles Chalmers – vocals
- Sandra Chalmers – vocals
- Steve Chapin – piano, vocals
- Tom Chapin – banjo, guitar
- Howie Fields – drums
- Chuck Kirkpatrick – vocals, electric guitar
- Joe Lala – percussion
- Donna Rhodes – vocals
- Doug Walker – electric guitar
- John Wallace – bass guitar, vocals
