= Remember When the Music =

Studio album by Harry Chapin
- Released: 1987
- Recorded: 1979–80
- Genre: Singer-songwriter
- Length: 53:51
- Label: Dunhill Compact Classics
- Producer: Fat Albert Productions, Inc.

Harry Chapin chronology
Anthology of Harry Chapin (1985)	Remember When the Music (1987)	The Gold Medal Collection (1988)

Professional ratings
Review scores
Source	Rating
Allmusic	1/5 stars

Remember When the Music is a posthumously produced album by the American singer-songwriter Harry Chapin, released in 1987. Produced on CD and cassette tape, it contained the same tracks as the album, Sequel, which was the last complete album released during Harry's lifetime, plus two previously unreleased tracks, "Hokey Pokey" and "Oh Man". The order of the first four tracks were changed, fitting in with the new name.

== Track listing ==
1. "Remember When the Music"
2. "I Miss America"
3. "Story of a Life"
4. "Sequel"
5. "Up on the Shelf"
6. "Salt and Pepper"
7. "God Babe, You've Been Good for Me"
8. "Northwest 222"
9. "I Finally Found It Sandy"
10. "Remember When the Music – Reprise"
11. "Hokey Pokey"
12. "Oh Man"

== Personnel ==
- Harry Chapin – guitar, vocals, trumpet
- Steve Chapin – keyboards
- John Wallace – bass
- Howie Fields – drums
- Doug Walker – electric guitar
- Tom Chapin – banjo, guitar
- Yvonne Cable – cello
- Joe Lala – percussion
- Chuck Kirkpatrick – additional background vocals
- Howard Albert – synthesizers
