= Six String Orchestra =

"Six String Orchestra" is a song written, composed, and performed by Harry Chapin and released on his 1974 album Verities & Balderdash.

== The content ==
The lyrics of "Six String Orchestra" are narrated by, and describe, a young man who buys a guitar, which he christens his "monophonic symphony six-string orchestra." He practices late in his room and is not disturbed, his mother saying he is "nothing yet to make the folks write home."

As the narrator tries to realize his aspirations of being a singer, his lack of talent becomes evident. He performs at talent nights to what amounts to polite applause, but is screamed off the stages when he tries to perform encores, and dreams about a group helping him out. The instruments, a bass guitar, a lead guitar, a drum set, and strings, all join him as he mentions each in the refrain. These all play along with him (and his singing improves) through the last line of the refrain, but just before "orchestra," they all stop, leaving him attempting to play.

The narrator's failures continue. Love songs he writes, composes, and performs for a girl he is trying to impress instead result in her excusing herself to find a bar before he gets to finish. A demonstration recording he mails to record companies is returned to him at least three times, twice marked "address unknown" and on a C.O.D. basis the third time. He also receives form letters from these record companies, whose suggestions include finding a trade where he will not be required to sing. The narrator even resorts to taking guitar lessons, but his teacher takes leave; the narrator explains, "It was something about a breakdown or needing a reprieve." He is undeterred and pledges to persevere.

Chapin's point is that the narrator of "Six String Orchestra" is ultimately doomed to failure in his ambitions to make his career in music because of a total lack of talent and complete inability to play the very guitar he has hoped will be his ticket to fame—a guitar of low price and even lower quality that the narrator does not even bother to keep in tune.

== Known production ==
"Six String Orchestra," like the entire album Verities & Balderdash, was produced by Paul Leka, and performed by Chapin, on the album, as if it were part of a live concert. From time to time, audience laughter can be heard on the song, and Chapin deliberately plays his acoustic guitar poorly, and as if it were out of tune.

== Cover versions ==
- Scooter of the Muppets covered the song on the Star Wars episode of The Muppet Show.
- On the Harry Chapin Tribute album, the Smothers Brothers perform their own version of it, interpolating some of their trademark shtick throughout.
- Eddie Skoller made a Danish version in 1982 called "6-strengs en-mands-band" backed up by the band Shu-bi-dua.
- Hector made a Finnish version called "Monofilharmoonikko" in 1982
