= Portrait Gallery (album) =

Studio album by Harry Chapin
- Released: September 1975
- Studios: Connecticut Recording Studio, Bridgeport, Connecticut
- Genres: Pop, rock
- Length: 47:42
- Label: Elektra
- Producer: Paul Leka

Harry Chapin chronology
Verities & Balderdash (1974)	Portrait Gallery (1975)	Greatest Stories Live (1976)

Singles from Portrait Gallery
- 1. "Dreams Go By" Released: September 1975

Professional ratings
Review scores
Source	Rating
AllMusic	2/5 stars
Rolling Stone	1/5 stars

Portrait Gallery is the fifth studio album by the American singer-songwriter Harry Chapin, released in 1975.

== History ==
An early version of "Someone Keeps Calling My Name", done in a folk-rock vein reminiscent of The Byrds, appeared on the obscure 1966 album Chapin recorded with his brothers, Chapin Music!. The main guitar riff (and entire arrangement) in this version is strikingly similar to The Blue Things' equally obscure 1966 track "Doll House." Another version of the song was recorded for the 1972 album Sniper and Other Love Songs under the title of "City Sweet", but did not make the final cut. It was later released in 2004 on the Heads & Tales / Sniper & Other Love Songs CD compilation.

The album artwork was designed and illustrated by Milton Glaser.

Record World said the single "Tangled Up Puppet" showcased Chapin "at his incisive best".

== Track listing ==
Side one
No.	Title	Length
1.	"Dreams Go By"	4:46
2.	"Tangled Up Puppet (Harry Chapin/Sandy Chapin)"	3:45
3.	"Star Tripper"	4:19
4.	"Babysitter"	4:36
5.	"Someone Keeps Calling My Name"	6:30

Side two
No.	Title	Length
1.	"The Rock"	4:16
2.	"Sandy"	2:48
3.	"Dirt Gets Under the Fingernails"	3:48
4.	"Bummer"	9:55
5.	"Stop Singing These Sad Songs"	2:59

== Personnel ==
- Harry Chapin - guitar, vocals
- Murray Adler - violin
- Ron Bacchiocchi - synthesiser, percussion
- Ed Bednarski - clarinet
- Gene Bianco - harmonica
- George Bohanon - trombone
- Bud Brisbois - trumpet
- Steve Chapin - piano, clavinet, vocals
- Tom Chapin - vocals
- Rita Coolidge - vocals
- Assa Drori - violin
- Jesse Ehrlich - cello
- Joan Fishman - vocals
- Joe Flood - vocals
- Ronald Folsom - violin
- James Getzoff - violin
- Jeff Gross - vocals
- Jim Horn - saxophone
- Paul Hubinon - trumpet
- Bill Hymanson - strings
- Armand Kaproff - cello
- Jackie Kelso - saxophone
- David Kondziela - vocals
- Paul Leka - piano, celeste, harpsichord
- Jonathan B. Lindle - vocals
- Betty MacIver - vocals
- Pete MacIver - vocals
- Michael Masters - cello
- Marti McCall - vocals
- Jay Migliori - saxophone, flute
- Tim Moore - keyboards, clavinet
- Todd Mulder - vocals
- Alexander Neiman - viola
- Gareth Nuttycombe - viola
- Ronald Palmer - guitar, vocals
- Geoff Parker - vocals, choir, chorus
- Judi Parker - vocals
- Don Payne - bass
- Donald Peake - synthesizer
- Stanley Plummer - violin
- Katherine Anne Porter - vocals
- Frank Porto - accordion
- Kathy Ramos - vocals
- Henry Roth - violin
- Allan Schwartzberg - drums
- Tim Scott - cello
- Jack Shulman - violin
- Frank Simms - vocals
- George Simms - vocals
- Ken Smith - flute, mandolin
- Bob Springer - percussion
- Billy Swan - vocals
- John Tropea - guitar
- Sheila Turner - vocals
- Christopher Von Koschembahr - vocals
- John Wallace - bass, vocals
- Rob White - whistle
- Susan White - vocals
- Carolyn Willis - vocals

== Charts ==
Year	Chart	Position
1975	Billboard 200	53
1975	Australian (Kent Music Report)	88
