= The Last Protest Singer =

Studio album by Harry Chapin
- Released: 1988
- Recorded: 1980–81
- Genre: Folk rock
- Length: 44:21
- Label: Dunhill Compact Classics
- Producer: Keith Walsh, Clair Marlo

Harry Chapin chronology
| The Gold Medal Collection (1988) | The Last Protest Singer (1988) | The Bottom Line Encore Collection (1998) |

Professional ratings
Review scores
| Source | Rating |
|---|---|
| Allmusic | 2/5 stars |

The Last Protest Singer is a posthumously produced album by the American singer-songwriter Harry Chapin, released in 1988. Chapin had been working on the album when he died in 1981. Up to 18 songs were on the master tape to a greater or lesser extent. Eleven of these were far enough advanced to create this album.

The track listing on the Dunhill issue differs from that on the more recent Chapin Productions CD version, with Dunhill uniquely having 'Anthem'/'A Quiet Little Love Affair' and the Chapin Productions CD having 'Oh Man'.

According to Chapin, the album's name and lead track is in memory of Chilean activist Víctor Jara, who sang during his torture before being murdered for protesting the 1973 Chilean coup d'état.

== Track listing ==
1. "Last of the Protest Singers"
2. "November Rains"
3. "Basic Protest Song"
4. "Last Stand"
5. "Sounds Like America to Me"
6. "Word Wizard"
7. "Anthem"
8. "A Quiet Little Love Affair"
9. "I Don't Want to Be President"
10. "Silly Little Girl"
11. "You Own the Only Light"

== Personnel ==
- Harry Chapin – guitar, vocals
- Clair Marlo – Producer, arranger, synthesizer
- Tom Chapin – guitar
- Grant Geissman – guitar
- Jon Cobert – piano
- Steve Chapin – piano
- Pat Coil – piano
- Bill Lanphier – bass guitar
- John Wallace – bass guitar
- Howie Fields – drums and percussion
- M. B. Gordy – drums and percussion
- Doug Walker – electric guitar
- Jon Cobert – synthesizer
