= Harry Chapin: When in Doubt, Do Something =

2020 documentary-biographical film directed by Rick Korn

- Directed by: Rick Korn
- Produced by: Rick Korn
- Starring: Harry Chapin
- Music by: Harry Chapin
- Production company: In Plain View Entertainment
- Distributed by: Greenwich Entertainment
- Release date: October 16, 2020
- Running time: 93 minutes
- Country: United States
- Language: English

Harry Chapin: When in Doubt, Do Something is a 2020 documentary-biographical film directed by Rick Korn documenting the life and career of Harry Chapin.

== Background ==
The film covers Chapin's life, career and political activism. It is told through interviews, archive footage, and photos. The film features testimonials from Chapin's family, band members, and peers that include Billy Joel, Pat Benatar, Kenny Rogers, and Bruce Springsteen.

== Cast ==
- Harry Chapin (archive footage)
- Harry Belafonte
- Pat Benatar
- Bob Geldof
- Billy Joel
- Robert Lamm
- Tom Chapin
- Darryl McDaniels
- Kenny Rogers
- Pete Seeger (archive footage)
- Bruce Springsteen
- Ken Kragen
- John Wallace
- Bill Ayres
