= Onwards and Upwards =

Compilation album by Harry Chapin
- Released: 2000

Harry Chapin chronology
Story of a Life (1999)	Onwards and Upwards (2000)	VH1 Behind the Music: The Harry Chapin Collection (2001)

Onwards and Upwards is a posthumously produced compilation album by the American singer-songwriter Harry Chapin, released in 2000 by The Harry Chapin Foundation. Foundation board member and archivist Jason Dermer completed all production work. All profits directly benefitted the Foundation's charitable work.

The eight tracks consist of alternate or live versions of previously released songs or demos. "It's You Girl" is from the pitch session of the songs Harry used for the Broadway Show The Night That Made America Famous. "Wind Coming Up" was from the "Last Protest Singer" demos.

== Tracks ==
1. It's You Girl (3:39, previously unreleased)
2. Story of a Life (5:37, alternate mix)
3. Wind Coming Up (3:42, previously unreleased)
4. Basic Protest Song (4:36, alternate version)
5. Last of the Protest Singers (4:50, alternate version)
6. Sequel (8:38, early version)
7. Remember When the Music (4:12, live version)
8. Last Stand (6:02, alternate version)
