= Could You Put Your Light On, Please =

Single by Harry Chapin

from the album Heads & Tales
- B-side: "Mono"
- Released: March 1972
- Recorded: 1972
- Genre: Folk rock
- Length: 3:38
- Label: Elektra Records
- Songwriter: Harry Chapin
- Producer: Fred Kewley

Harry Chapin singles chronology
"Taxi" (1972)	"Could You Put Your Light On, Please" (1972)	"Sunday Morning Sunshine" (1972)

"Could You Put Your Light On, Please" is a song written and performed by Harry Chapin. The song was included on his 1972 album, Heads & Tales. It has also been included on numerous posthumous compilation albums.

Record World called it "a flowing, folky ballad with an interesting interlude, and a fine wedding of melody, lyrics and production."

== Different Versions ==
In 2004, a double album called Heads & Tales/Sniper and Other Love Songs was released. It features the full albums with some unreleased tracks. This song was included and showed an unreleased version.

== Charts ==
=== Weekly charts ===
Chart (1972–73)	Peak position
Canada RPM Top 100	76
U.S. Cash Box Top 100	81

== Other uses ==
In 1973, Arthur Fiedler and The Boston Pops released an orchestral cover of this song. This was anthologized on the 2007 release Arthur Fiedler Legacy: From Fabulous Broadway to Hollywood's Reel Thing on the Deutsche Grammophon label.
