= Legends of the Lost and Found =

Legends of the Lost And Found

Live album by Harry Chapin
- Released: September 1979
- Genre: Pop/rock
- Label: Elektra
- Producers: Steve Chapin, Josh Chapin, Jason Dermer

Harry Chapin chronology
Living Room Suite (1978)	Legends of the Lost And Found (1979)	Sequel (1980)

Professional ratings
Review scores
Source	Rating
Allmusic	2/5 stars

Legends of the Lost and Found: New Greatest Stories Live is the second live album by the American singer/songwriter Harry Chapin, released in 1979 (see 1979 in music). It featured ten new songs plus live versions of six tracks from recent albums. The album was not released on CD until 2005 when the Chapin family acquired the rights to the music. The new version was remixed from the original multitrack recordings by Harry's son Josh (executive producer) and Chapin Foundation board member and archivist Jason Dermer (producer/engineer). While making every attempt to stay true to the original version's sound as mixed by Steve Chapin, the new release features a revised track order that better follows the progression and feel of a Harry Chapin concert from that time period, as well as vocals that, through modern technique, rely less on the overdubs that were used in the original.

== Track listing ==
Side one
No.	Title	Length
1.	"Stranger With the Melodies"	7:06
2.	"Copper"	5:15
3.	"The Day They Closed the Factory Down"	5:47
4.	"Pretzel Man"	3:09

Side two
No.	Title	Length
1.	"If My Mary Were Here"	4:51
2.	"Old Folkie"	4:51
3.	"Get on With It"	5:22
4.	"We Were Three"	5:20

Side three
No.	Title	Length
1.	"Poor Damned Fool"	4:28
2.	"Flowers Are Red"	5:08
3.	"Mail Order Annie"	5:44
4.	"Odd Job Man"	5:16

Side four
No.	Title	Length
1.	"Legends of the Lost and Found"	4:12
2.	"Tangled up Puppet"	4:37
3.	"Corey's Coming"	8:09
4.	"You Are the Only Song/Circle"	4:02

== Charts and certifications ==
=== Charts ===
Year	Chart	Position
1979	Billboard 200	163
1979	Australian (Kent Music Report)	64
1979	Canadian Albums Chart	72

== CD track listing ==
Disc 1:

1. "Old Folkie" – 4:51
2. "Stranger With the Melodies" – 7:06
3. "We Were Three" – 5:20
4. "Legends of the Lost and Found" – 4:12
5. "Flowers Are Red" – 5:08
6. "Pretzel Man" – 3:09
7. "Odd Job Man" – 5:16
8. "Tangled Up Puppet" – 4:37
9. "Get on With It" – 5:22
10. "If My Mary Were Here" – 4:51

Disc 2:

1. "Poor Damned Fool" – 4:27
2. "Copper" – 5:15
3. "The Day They Closed the Factory Down" – 5:47
4. "Mail Order Annie" – 5:44
5. "Corey's Coming" – 8:09
6. "You Are the Only Song/Circle" – 3:59

== Personnel ==
- Harry Chapin – guitar, vocals
- Steven Chapin – piano, vocals
- Howie Fields – drums
- Kim Scholes – cello
- Doug Walker – guitar, vocals
- John Wallace – bass, vocals
