= Sunday Morning Sunshine =

Single by Harry Chapin

from the album Sniper and Other Love Songs
- B-side: "Burning Herself"
- Released: October 1972
- Recorded: 1972
- Genre: Folk rock
- Length: 3:28
- Label: Elektra Records
- Songwriter: Harry Chapin
- Producer: Fred Kewley

Harry Chapin singles chronology
"Could You Put Your Light On, Please" (1972)	"Sunday Morning Sunshine" (1972)	"A Better Place to Be" (1973)

"Sunday Morning Sunshine" is a song written and performed by Harry Chapin. The song was included on his 1972 album, Sniper and Other Love Songs. The song was released as a single the same year as his top 20 hit, "Taxi" and debut album, Heads & Tales. Cash Box described it as a "realistic look at city life." Record World said to "look for this melodic self-penning to be covered often and well." The song charted on the Billboard Hot 100, however it received more commercial success when it charted as a top 30 on the Billboard Adult Contemporary. The song has also been included on numerous posthumous compilation albums. King Biscuit Flower Hour recorded a live performance of the song for the show.

== Chart performance ==
=== Weekly charts ===
Chart (1972–73)	Peak position
U.S. Billboard Adult Contemporary	30
U.S. Billboard Hot 100	75
U.S. Cashbox Top 100	77
CAN RPM Top 100	68

=== Year-end charts ===
Chart (1972)	Peak position
U.S. Billboard Hot 100	429

== Other uses ==
- The Swinging Blue Jeans covered the song on a single released in 1975.
- Tom Chapin and Steve Chapin's live performance is included on The Chapin Family's Harry Chapin: A Celebration in Song: Volume I album.
