= What Made America Famous? =

Single by Harry Chapin

from the album Verities & Balderdash
- B-side: "Mono"
- Released: August 1974
- Recorded: 1974
- Genre: Folk rock
- Length: 6:43
- Label: Elektra
- Songwriter: Harry Chapin
- Producer: Paul Leka

Harry Chapin singles chronology
"Cat's in the Cradle" (1974)	"What Made America Famous?" (1974)	"I Wanna Learn a Love Song" (1974)

"What Made America Famous?" is a song written and performed by Harry Chapin. The song was included on his 1974 album, Verities & Balderdash. It has also been included on numerous posthumous compilation albums. The song inspired Chapin to write the award-nominated Broadway musical, The Night That Made America Famous.

== Background ==
The song shows a man, his girlfriend, and kids living in a rundown home. Eventually, a house fire starts, and they need rescue. It is continually asked in the song if anybody cares. It ends with the firefighters waiting to respond to "let them sweat a little", and the plumber ends up saving everyone in the home. They spend the night in the plumber's home and realize that heroes are people who you'd never suspect, or ever know.

== Inspiration ==
The song was inspired when Chapin himself lived in Point Lookout in Long Island during the 1960s. There was a suspicious fire in a low-income residence. Although it is unknown how the actual firefighters responded, he imagined that they responded like in the song.

Chapin also said, ""What Made America Famous", basically comes out of a thing where my wife was saying 'You should write a song about a volunteer fire department and name it "Answering the Call".' Now, I took it to a whole other place, but I'm a believer in recognizing good ideas. My wife happens to be a fantastic poet and I've been very lucky to have her with me."

== Reception ==
Cash Box said that "Harry's vocals are as dramatically sensitive as ever and the music arrangement perfectly fits in making this a long, but totally captivating musical experience." Record World said it was a masterpiece that "directly addresses our country's splintered psyche."

== Charts ==
=== Weekly charts ===
Chart (1974–1975)	Peak position
US Cash Box Top 100	87
