= Jim Chapin =

American jazz drummer (1919–2009)

- Chapin in 2006

Background information
- Born: July 23, 1919; New York City, U.S.
- Died: July 4, 2009 (aged 89) Fort Myers, Florida, U.S.
- Genre: Jazz
- Occupations: Musician; educator
- Instrument: Drums
- Children: 10, including Harry, Tom, and Steve
- Parents: James Ormsbee Chapin (father); Abigail Forbes (mother)
- Family: Kenneth Burke (father-in-law); Jen Chapin, Chapin Sisters (granddaughters); Samuel Chapin (ancestor)

James Forbes Chapin (/ˈtʃeɪpɪn/ CHAY-pin) (July 23, 1919 – July 4, 2009) was an American jazz drummer and the author of books about jazz drumming. He is in the Percussive Arts Society Hall of Fame and was posthumously inducted into the Modern Drummer Hall of Fame in 2011.

== Early life ==
Chapin was born in Manhattan, New York, the son of Abigail Forbes and painter James Ormsbee Chapin. Chapin first played piano and clarinet, and left college at the age of 18, when he started to play the drums, studying with Sanford Moeller.

== Later life and career ==
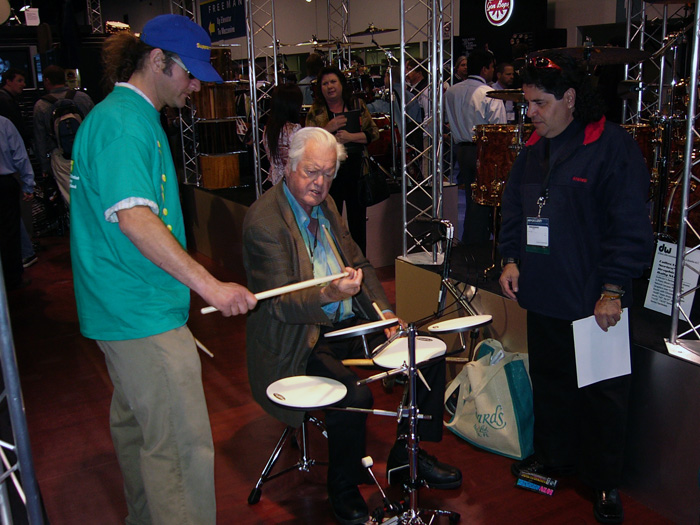
Chapin at the 2006 NAMM Show

After stints in an assortment of bands, Chapin played with Red Norvo in 1943.

Chapin coined the term "coordinated independence" to describe the skill of a drummer where "both hands and feet are performing parts which are rhythmically independent from one another". His Advanced Techniques for the Modern Drummer textbook was published in 1948. At the time, it was perhaps the only such book targeted only at drummers. In 2009, a writer for Drum! magazine wrote that it was "arguably the most important drum set text ever written".

In 1954, Chapin led a band that played weekly at Birdland in New York City; this continued into 1956. His sextet of Don Stratton (trumpet), Billy Byers (trombone), Phil Woods (alto sax), Sonny Truitt (piano), and Chuck Andrus (bass) recorded the album Jim Chapin Ensemble in 1954; it was reissued in expanded form as The Jim Chapin Sextet around 1960. The following year, he led an octet of Jimmy Nottingham (trumpet), Urbie Green (trombone), Bob Wilber (tenor sax), Phil Woods and George Dorsey (alto sax), Hank Jones (piano), and Wilbur Ware (bass) that recorded Profile of a Jazz Drummer. Chapin played with bassist Marshall Grant between 1958 and 1960.

For eight months starting in October 1968, Chapin taught drummer Gene Krupa weekly, helping Krupa in his recovery from emphysema. In 1971, Chapin's Advanced Techniques for the Modern Drummer, Volume II was published.

Chapin traveled around the world teaching and presenting seminars, including teaching Peter Criss after he left the group Kiss in the early 1980s. Chapin also gave Alex Van Halen of the rock band Van Halen a lesson. A Chapin instructional video, Speed, Power, Control, Endurance, was released in 1992. Chapin died in Florida on July 4, 2009.
