= Short Stories (Harry Chapin album) =

Studio album by Harry Chapin
- Released: December 1973
- Recorded: 1973
- Genre: Folk rock
- Length: 44:26
- Label: Elektra
- Producer: Paul Leka

Harry Chapin chronology
Sniper and Other Love Songs (1972)	Short Stories (1973)	Verities & Balderdash (1974)

Singles from Short Stories
- 1. "W.O.L.D." Released: December 1973

Professional ratings
Review scores
Source	Rating
AllMusic	3/5 stars
Christgau's Record Guide	D+

Short Stories is the third studio album by the American singer-songwriter Harry Chapin, released in 1973. (see 1973 in music). "W.O.L.D.", "Mr Tanner" and "Mail Order Annie" remained amongst his most popular works for the rest of his life. "W.O.L.D." went to number 36 on the Billboard Hot 100 chart and had commercial success in the top 10 in other countries such as Canada.

== Track listing ==
Side one
No.	Title	Length
1.	"Short Stories"	4:37
2.	"W.O.L.D."	5:15
3.	"Song for Myself"	4:30
4.	"Song Man"	3:15
5.	"Changes"	4:32

Side two
No.	Title	Length
1.	"They Call Her Easy"	4:05
2.	"Mr. Tanner"	5:12
3.	"Mail Order Annie"	4:56
4.	"There's a Lot of Lonely People Tonight"	3:45
5.	"Old College Avenue"	4:19

== Personnel ==
- Harry Chapin – guitar, vocals
- Dave Armstrong – harmonica
- Tomi Lee Bradley – vocals
- Bobby Carlin – drums
- Jeanne French – vocals
- Paul Leka – keyboards
- Michael Masters – cello
- Ronald Palmer – guitar, vocals
- Buddy Saltzman – drums
- John Wallace – bass guitar, vocals
- Tim Scott – cello

== Charts and certifications ==
=== Charts ===
Year	Chart	Position
1973/74	Billboard 200	61
1973/74	Australian (Kent Music Report)	46
1973/74	Canadian Albums Chart	39

=== Certifications ===
Region	Certification	Sales
United States	Gold	1,000,000
Canada	Platinum	100,000
