= Corey's Coming =

Single by Harry Chapin

from the album On the Road to Kingdom Come
- B-side: "If My Mary Were Here"
- Released: November 1976
- Recorded: 1976
- Genre: Folk rock, soft rock
- Length: 5:38
- Label: Elektra
- Songwriter: Harry Chapin
- Producer: Stephen Chapin

Harry Chapin singles chronology
"Star Tripper" (1976)	"Corey's Coming" (1976)	"Dance Band on the Titanic" (1977)

"Corey's Coming" is a song written and sung by Harry Chapin. It was released on his 1976 album On the Road to Kingdom Come.

== Story ==
The song, sung in first person, tells of John Joseph, an old man who lives out in the railroad yards. The Narrator tells how he likes to visit him in the evenings to listen to the old man's stories of the "glories of his past" and how he always ends the night with story of the arrival of his Corey, who he describes like an apparent love interest coming for him.

My Corey's coming, no more sad stories coming
My midnight-moonlight-morning-glory's coming aren't you girl?
And like I told you, when she holds you
She enfolds you in her world.

The Narrator finds the old man's stories surprising and asks the town's folk about them to which they respond that "Old John was born here / he's lived here all his life / he's never had a woman let alone a wife" and that "no one named Corey's ever lived in this town". The Narrator questions John Joseph about town's response to which he smiles and says "Reality is only just a word" and repeats the story again as the song's chorus.

One evening, the Narrator finds that John Joseph has died in his sleep. At the graveyard, after the only other attendees of the funeral (a parson and gravedigger) leave, the Narrator looks up to find he's not alone. There is a woman standing there who simply says "My name is Corey, you can say I'm just a friend." The song ends with the Narrator thanking the listener(s) for listening to his story, revealing that he is the person now that lives in the railroad yards and carries on the stories and ends the song with the final chorus stating that "Corey's coming" now for him.

== Reception ==
Cash Box said it is a "pretty tune" and that "Chapin’s ability to tell such an involved tale within a short pop song is unbeatable.."

== Extended version ==
For the album Legends of the Lost and Found, Chapin records an extended-live version of the song going more in-depth about John Joseph's stories and Corey's revelation. This version was often performed at Chapin's concerts.

== Who is Corey? ==
Chapin never really explained in the song who Corey actually is or whether she is real or not. Chapin said the song was about "an old man with a dream and a young boy who buys it" in live version's introduction on Legends of the Lost and Found. Many listeners believe Corey is an imaginary character that only exists in the mind of John Joseph and his stories, which is why he states that reality is only a word. However, it could also be that Corey is real and the reason nobody knows of her is because she travels on the trains to the railroad yards to visit John Joseph. Another explanation is that Corey could be the angel of death "coming" to take the old man away, or that "Corey" was a joke the old man shared with the narrator, possibly derived from "C&O RailRoad".

Chapin did however explain where the name came from was from a fan he stayed with on the road that fed him when he was a struggling artist. As mentioned in his autobiography, Corey was the name of the woman of the couple.
