= Dance Band on the Titanic (song) =

Single by Harry Chapin

from the album Dance Band on the Titanic
- B-side: "I Wonder What Happened to Him"
- Released: 1977
- Recorded: 1977
- Genre: Pop, rock
- Length: 4:35
- Label: Elektra Records
- Songwriter: Harry Chapin
- Producer: Steve Chapin

Harry Chapin singles chronology
| "A Better Place to Be (Live)" (1976) | "Dance Band on the Titanic" (1977) | "Flowers Are Red" (1978) |

Singles from Dance Band on the Titanic
- 1. "Dance Band on the Titanic" Released: 1977

"Dance Band on the Titanic" is a song written and performed by Harry Chapin. The song was included on the album Dance Band on the Titanic in 1977. Released as a single, the song became a hit on the Australian Charts. It has been included on numerous posthumous compilation albums.

== Background ==
When describing the song, Chapin says that the entertainment industry acts like the Titanic's actual band; creating diversions so no one focuses on the iceberg.

Record World said that the song "incorporates bits of music hall, jazz and boogie-woogie, all underlying a bizarre tale of a famous sinking, icebergs and all."

== Chart performance ==
| Chart (1977) | Peak position |
|---|---|
| Australia | 87 |

== Other uses ==
- It was included on the Lies and Legends cast recording in 1984.
