= 30,000 Pounds of Bananas =

1974 song by Harry Chapin

Song by Harry Chapin

from the album Verities & Balderdash
- Released: August 1974
- Genre: Folk
- Length: 5:45
- Label: Elektra
- Songwriter: Harry Chapin

"30,000 Pounds of Bananas", sometimes rendered "Thirty Thousand Pounds of Bananas", is a folk rock song by Harry Chapin from his 1974 album, Verities & Balderdash. The song became more popular in its live extended recording from Chapin's 1976 concert album, Greatest Stories Live, that started the phrase "Harry, it sucks." The song is based on an actual truck accident that occurred in Scranton, Pennsylvania, in 1965.

== Incident ==
On March 18, 1965, 33-year-old truck driver Eugene P. Sesky was on his way to deliver a load of bananas to Scranton, Pennsylvania. He was returning from the boat piers at Newark, New Jersey where he had picked up his load, which was destined for the A&P produce warehouse in South Side. He was driving a 1950s Brockway diesel truck tractor with a 35 ft (11 m) trailer and was headed down Rt. 307 when he lost control. That section of Rt. 307 contains a two-mile descent extending from Lake Scranton to the bottom of Moosic Street that includes a drop in elevation of more than 500 ft (150 m) in less than 1.5 mi (2.4 km). Sesky was unable to control the truck's speed down the hill due to a mechanical failure, variously attributed to the truck's brake system or its clutch. As a result, the truck cruised into Scranton at approximately 90 mph (140 km/h), sideswiping a number of cars before it crashed into a house at the southwest corner of Moosic St. and S. Irving Ave (41.4000°N 75.6550°W), close to the bottom of the hill. Witnesses reported that Sesky did everything possible to avoid pedestrians and other motorists, including climbing out to the truck's running board to try to warn people, and some have suggested that he may have deliberately flipped the truck over to avoid striking either bystanders or an automotive service station on Moosic Street that could have exploded in flames, causing a greater loss of life. Sesky was thrown from the truck and killed, and bananas were spilled and strewn when the rig came to rest; 15 others were injured but only Sesky died. The road was closed for cleanup as Johnson's Towing Company helped out in the recovery. Trucks under 21,000 pounds were required to go down the hill in first gear. Trucks over 21,000 pounds are no longer allowed to travel that route and must use Interstate 380 via Dunmore.

== Song ==
The song portrays a fictional account of the incident played in the form of a country song. With each verse, the song gets faster to, as Chapin explained in the live recording, "build up intensity and excitement." During the chorus, Chapin sings the phrase "thirty-thousand pounds" followed by Big John Wallace singing the bass line "of bananas." During concerts, the audience was encouraged to shout this refrain.

=== Content ===
A young truck driver is driving at night to deliver a load of bananas to Scranton, the population of which consumes about 30,000 pounds (14 tonnes) of bananas daily. While approaching Scranton, he fails to notice a sign warning that those who do not shift into low gear will pay a traffic ticket because he is too busy thinking about seeing his wife after his trip. He begins to travel down the steep road to the bottom of the hill. Suddenly, the truck begins to go faster down the hill, and the driver tries to apply the brakes, only to discover that they are not working. The load of bananas pushes against the truck, causing it to pick up speed. Cruising into Scranton, he almost strikes a passing bus. The driver then prays to God to make the event all a dream before he damages a number of cars and other obstacles, besides injuring a few people, before he is decapitated in a crash, and 400 yards (370 metres) of the hill is smeared with his load of bananas.

The song's epilogue tells the story how Chapin first heard of the event aboard a Greyhound bus coming out of Scranton some months later. An old man sitting next to Chapin implores him to imagine "30,000 pounds of mashed bananas."

Many details in the song correspond closely to the actual incident, but others are invented or fictionalized. In particular, Sesky was not actually decapitated in the accident.

=== Alternate endings ===
In the live performance from the album Greatest Stories Live, Chapin sings two alternate endings to the song he originally had in mind, explaining to the audience that the rest of the band was less than enthusiastic about them, with his brothers Tom and Steve each offering the summary dismissal, "Harry, it sucks!" The first alternate ending uses the 1923 novelty song "Yes! We Have No Bananas" as the punchline of the song, with the last line changed to "Bananas in Scranton, PA".

The second ending is described by Chapin as a "country-western" ending about "motherhood", given that the song features a truck It deals with a young mother crying while watching her child sleeping. The woman is presumably the truck driver's widow and, because of her sorrow over the accident, she no longer eats bananas. During concerts, Chapin divided the audience during this ending, usually turning it into a contest between men and women with regard to singing skill. The second alternate ending has everyone sing "of Bananas!" in harmony, swelling to a climax and cutting off.

A third alternate ending surfaced later, which Chapin would often introduce with a monologue about Donny and Marie Osmond, and the technical definition of the word "sucks". The third alternate ending is a parody of a Chiquita banana commercial, done in "Jimmy Buffett style," with the participation of the whole band. The ending is cut short by Big John singing the first verse of "Taxi" in the form of an upbeat disco style that concludes with Chapin telling him "it sucks."

The Bottom Line CD features the four endings along with "Final Concert." Other recorded examples of the song with all four endings include performances at Knoxville Memorial Stadium on March 7, 1979; the Coffee Break Concert broadcast on WMMS Cleveland on December 5, 1979; and the Boston University concert on April 1, 1981.

"Harry, it sucks" became a popular catchphrase among Chapin's fans, to the point where T-shirts sporting the phrase would be offered at his concerts.
