= Harry Chapin =

American singer-songwriter and activist (1942–1981)

- Chapin in 1980
- Born: Harry Forster Chapin; December 7, 1942; New York City, U.S.
- Died: July 16, 1981 (aged 38); East Meadow, New York, U.S.
- Education: Cornell University, no degree
- Musical career
- Genres: Folk rock; pop rock
- Occupations: Singer-songwriter; philanthropist
- Instruments: Vocals; guitar; piano; trumpet; harmonica
- Works: Discography
- Years active: 1968–1981
- Labels: Elektra; Boardwalk; Sequel Records; DCC Compact Classics; Chapin Productions
- Website: harrychapinmusic.com

Harry Forster Chapin (/ˈtʃeɪpɪn/; December 7, 1942 – July 16, 1981) was an American singer-songwriter, philanthropist, and hunger activist best known for his folk rock and pop rock songs. He achieved worldwide success in the 1970s. Chapin, a Grammy Award-winning artist and Grammy Hall of Fame inductee, has sold over 16 million records worldwide.

Chapin recorded a total of 11 albums from 1972 until his death in 1981. All 14 singles that he released became hits on at least one national music chart. He is known for his 1974 chart-topping song "Cat's in the Cradle", as well as "Taxi", "W.O.L.D.", "I Wanna Learn a Love Song", "Circle", and "Sequel".

Chapin campaigned to end world hunger. He was a participant in the creation of the Presidential Commission on World Hunger in 1977. In 1987, Chapin was posthumously awarded the Congressional Gold Medal for his humanitarian work.

== Early life ==
Harry Forster Chapin was born on December 7, 1942, in New York City, the second of four children of percussionist Jim Chapin and Jeanne Elspeth, daughter of the literary critic Kenneth Burke. His brothers, Tom and Steve, would also become musicians.

The first Chapin to come to America was Samuel Chapin, who was the first deacon of Springfield, Massachusetts, in 1636. His other great-grandparents on his mother's side had immigrated in the late 19th century. Chapin's parents divorced in 1950, with his mother retaining custody of their four sons, as Jim spent much of his time on the road as a drummer for Big Band-era acts such as Woody Herman. A few years later, Chapin's mother married Films in Review magazine editor Henry Hart.

Chapin's first formal introduction to music was trumpet lessons at The Greenwich House Music School under Mr. Karesick. Harry's younger brothers Tom and Steve were choirboys at Grace Episcopal Church in Brooklyn Heights, and through them Chapin met "Big" John Wallace, a baritone with a five-octave range, who later became his bassist, backing vocalist, and straight man onstage. Chapin began performing with his brothers while a teenager, with their father occasionally joining them on drums. Chapin graduated from Brooklyn Technical High School in 1960 and was among the five inductees in the school's Alumni Hall of Fame for the year 2000. He briefly attended the United States Air Force Academy in Colorado Springs, Colorado, and was then a student at Cornell University, but did not complete a degree.

Chapin originally intended to be a documentary filmmaker and took a job with The Big Fights, a company run by Bill Cayton that owned a large library of classic boxing films. In 1968, Chapin directed Legendary Champions, which was nominated for the Academy Award for Best Documentary Feature Film. Three years later, he began focusing on music. With John Wallace, Tim Scott, and Ron Palmer, Chapin started playing in various nightclubs in New York City.

== Career ==
=== Early music career (1971–1972) ===
In 1972, there was a bidding war over Chapin between Clive Davis at Columbia and Jac Holzman at Elektra. Chapin signed a multi-million dollar recording contract with Elektra Records. The contract was one of the biggest of its time. It granted him free recording time, along with other perks.

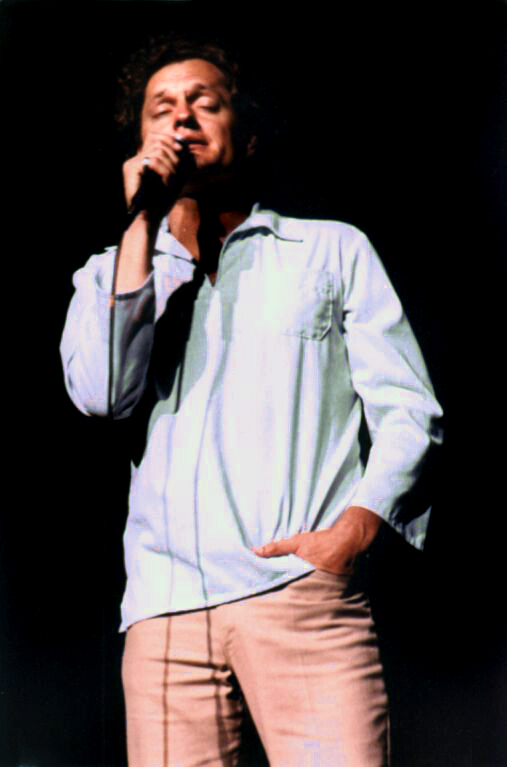
Chapin performing in the 1970s.

The same year, Chapin released his debut album, Heads & Tales. The album was an international success, selling over one million units, and contained the top-25 Billboard Hot 100 hit single "Taxi." The song also became a top-five hit in Canada. The success of the song in America is credited to American radio personality Jim Connors, who helped promote the song on the radio despite its length, and helped it to stay on the charts for 16 weeks. It became the number-one requested song for 10 weeks in a row. The song was performed on The Tonight Show Starring Johnny Carson, which received so many calls that Chapin returned the next night. It was the first time in the show's history that a performer had been called back the next night. It was also one of the first performances on The Midnight Special, with John Denver hosting.

When asked if the song was true, Chapin said "It's emotionally true, if not literally true. I've been in the film business on and off for a lot of years and wasn't doing well at one point. So, I went out and got a hack license for bread, and during the month that I was waiting for it to come through, I heard an old girlfriend of mine had gotten married and instead of becoming an actress, she married a rich guy. I envisioned some night I'd be driving a cab in the big city streets and this lady would get in the back, and I'd turn and look at her and she'd look at me and know we both sold out our dreams." Billboard ranked "Taxi" as the 85th song of the year. "Taxi" also earned Chapin a Grammy nomination for Best New Artist of the Year.

The follow-up album, Sniper and Other Love Songs, was also released in 1972. The album's title song, "Sniper," is a semi-fictional account of the University of Texas tower shooting. The single release from the album, "Sunday Morning Sunshine," charted on the Billboard Hot 100 and became a top-40 hit on Billboard Adult Contemporary. The album was less successful than the last, selling 350,000 units. The album also contained the Chapin anthem "Circle." In 2004, the double album Sniper and Other Love Songs and Heads & Tales was released. It contained previously unreleased tracks from both albums.

=== Career peak (1973–1975) ===
In 1973, Chapin released his third album, Short Stories. The album sold over 1 million units and produced another international hit, "W.O.L.D.," a song about an aging disc jockey who has given up his entire life and family for his career. The song is sung from the point of view of the disc jockey, who is singing to his ex-wife. It was inspired by American radio personality Jim Connors. Chapin wrote the song when he listened to Connors calling his ex-wife in the WMEX studio in Boston. The song became a top-40 hit on the Billboard Hot 100, a top-10 hit in Canada, and a top-10 and -20 hit in other countries. Other notable songs from the album not released as singles are "Mr. Tanner," "Mail Order Annie," and "They Call Her Easy." The song "Mr. Tanner" was loosely based on a pair of New York Times concert reviews of baritone Martin Tubridy – once in 1971 and once in 1972.

In 1974, Chapin released his most successful album, Verities and Balderdash, which sold 2.5 million units and contained the hit "Cat's in the Cradle." The song is about a father who does not find time for his son during the boy's childhood; then when the dad has time and wants to hang out with his son, the son has grown up and doesn't have time for his dad. The song earned Chapin another Grammy nomination for Best Male Pop Vocal Performance, and Chapin was inducted into the Grammy Hall of Fame. Verities and Balderdash peaked at number four on the Billboard 200. The album's follow-up single, "I Wanna Learn a Love Song," charted at number 7 on Billboard Adult Contemporary. The song is a true story of how Chapin met his wife, Sandra Chapin. "30,000 Pounds of Bananas" was included on the album and became the number-one requested song for a few weeks, despite not being released as a single. It is a semi-fictional account of a truck crash that occurred in Scranton, Pennsylvania, transporting bananas—based loosely on a March 18, 1965, accident involving truck driver Gene Sesky. Other notable songs from the album include "Shooting Star," "Halfway to Heaven," and "Six String Orchestra."

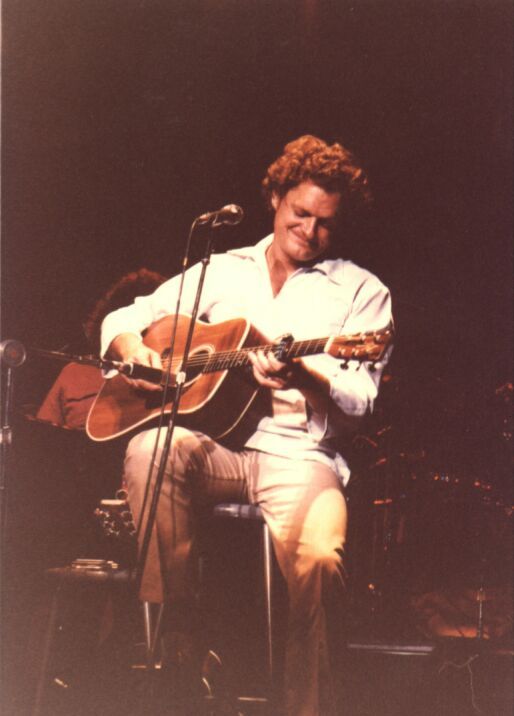
Harry Chapin live at Veterans Memorial Auditorium in February 1980.

In 1975, Chapin released his fifth album, Portrait Gallery, which produced a top-40 Billboard Adult Contemporary hit, "Dreams Go By." However, it was less successful than the last, selling 350,000 units. Chapin also wrote and performed a Broadway play, The Night That Made America Famous, which earned two Tony Award nominations and two Drama Desk Award nominations.

=== Later years (1976–1981) ===
In 1976, Chapin released his first live album, Greatest Stories Live, which sold 2.1 million units. However, Elektra Records underwent a management change and gave almost no promotion for his later albums with Elektra, but they all sold at least 250,000 units each and charted successfully.

By the end of the decade, Chapin concentrated more on touring than producing hit singles, but he still released one album a year. Chapin earned an estimated $2 million per year (equivalent to $7,080,000 in 2025) until his death in 1981, making him one of the highest-paid artists in the world. Chapin's album Dance Band on the Titanic sold poorly, but it was voted Album of the Year by The Times of London. In 1980, his recording contract with Elektra expired. Chapin signed a one-album contract with Boardwalk Records and released his ninth studio album, Sequel, which was described as his fastest-breaking album. Three singles were released, with all of them becoming hits. The first single, "Sequel," became a top-25 hit on the Billboard Hot 100. The song is a follow-up to “Taxi.” The second single, "Remember When the Music," became a top-50 hit on the Adult Contemporary Chart. The last single, "Story of a Life," became a hit on the Bubbling Under chart. The album sold 500,000 units.

== Philanthropic work ==
Chapin resolved to leave his imprint on Long Island, envisioning a Long Island where the arts flourished, universities expanded, and humane discourse was the norm. Chapin's widow, Sandra Chapin, stated: "He thought Long Island represented a remarkable opportunity."

Chapin speaking at the Russell House ballroom in the University of South Carolina.

In the mid-1970s, Chapin devoted much time and effort to social activism, including raising money to combat hunger in the United States. His daughter Jen said: "He saw hunger and poverty as an insult to America." Chapin co-founded the organization World Hunger Year with radio personality Bill Ayres, before returning to music with On the Road to Kingdom Come. He also released a book of poetry, Looking ... Seeing, in 1975. More than half of Chapin's concerts were benefit performances (for example, a concert to help save the Landmark Theatre in Syracuse, New York, as well as hunger causes such as food banks), and proceeds from his concert merchandise were used to support World Hunger Year. Among those he helped is filmmaker Michael Moore, who got help funding his Mid-Michigan based independent newspaper startup, The Flint Voice, with Chapin benefit concerts in 1977.

On October 15, 1977, a one-time benefit concert called Four Together - Concert for World Hunger and featuring Chapin and three other renowned folk and country rock singer-songwriters -- Gordon Lightfoot, James Taylor and John Denver -- was performed at the Olympia Stadium in Detroit, Mich. The performance -- which lasted nearly three hours -- was played live on CKLW AM 800 and raised money to combat world hunger.

Chapin's social causes at times caused friction among his band members. Chapin donated an estimated third of his paid concerts to charitable causes, often performing alone with his guitar to reduce costs.

One report quotes Chapin's widow Sandra Chapin saying soon after his death – "only with slight exaggeration" – that, "Harry was supporting 17 relatives, 14 associations, seven foundations, and 82 charities. Harry wasn't interested in saving money. He always said, 'Money is for people,' so he gave it away." Despite his success as a musician, Chapin left little money, and it was difficult to maintain the causes for which he raised more than $3 million during the last six years of his life. The Harry Chapin Foundation was the result.

== Death ==
Gravestone in the Huntington Rural Cemetery, Huntington, New York

On the afternoon of July 16, 1981, Chapin was driving westbound on the Long Island Expressway en route to perform at a free benefit concert at Lakeside Theater at Eisenhower Park in East Meadow, New York, that evening. At 12:27 P.M. near exit 40 in Jericho, New York, Chapin had reportedly put on his emergency flashers, decelerated his vehicle's speed to 15 mph (24 km/h), and had weaved from the far-left lane to the center lane, to the left lane, and then back to the center lane before his vehicle was struck from behind by a semi-trailer truck. The force of the collision crushed the rear of the car, ruptured the fuel tank, and dragged the car several hundred feet on the pavement. Passersby managed to help the unconscious Chapin out of his engulfed 1975 Volkswagen Rabbit. Chapin was immediately taken by police helicopter from the crash site outside Jericho, New York, to the nearby Nassau County Medical Center. He was pronounced dead at 1:05 P.M. at the age of 38 due to cardiac arrest and internal bleeding. The coroner who examined the body declared the cardiac arrest a result rather than a cause of the accident.

Sandra Chapin, Chapin's widow, won a $12 million decision in a negligence lawsuit against Supermarkets General, the owners of the truck involved in the accident.

Chapin is buried in the Huntington Rural Cemetery in Huntington, New York. His epitaph is taken from his 1978 song "I Wonder What Would Happen to This World":

Oh if a man tried
To take his time on Earth
And prove before he died
What one man's life could be worth
I wonder what would happen
to this world

== Legacy ==
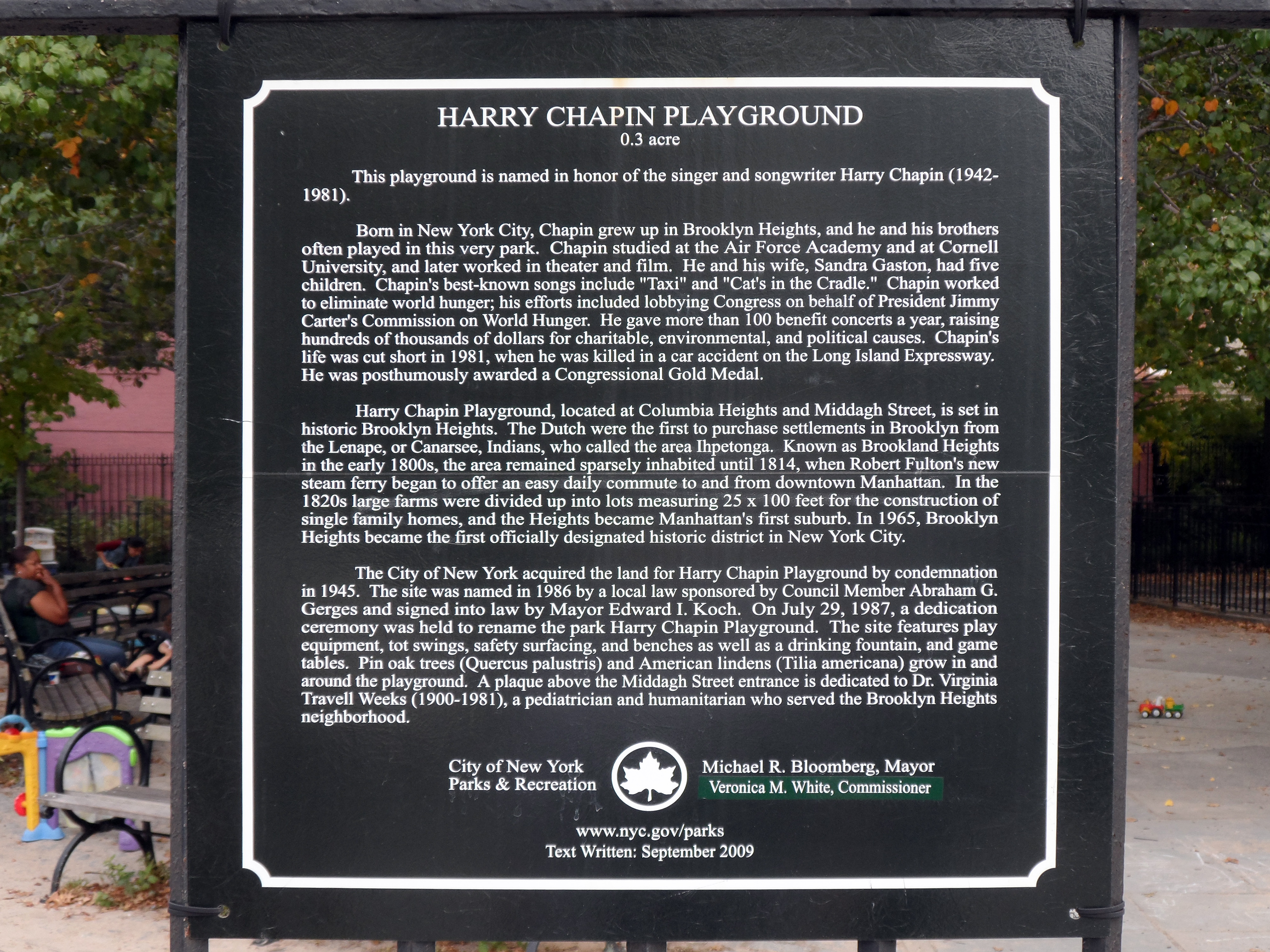
New York City playground named for Harry Chapin

Chapin's work on hunger included being involved in the creation of the Presidential Commission on World Hunger (under 39th President Jimmy Carter) in 1977 (he was the only member who attended every meeting).

Chapin was also the inspiration for Ken Kragen's, Chapin's manager at the end of Chapin's career, involvement in USA for Africa and Hands Across America. Kragen, explaining his work on these benefit events, said, "I felt like Harry had crawled into my body and was making me do it."

From around 1975 until the owners changed the format of the station in the late 1990s, WNEW-FM, 102.7, a NYC radio station with the motto "Where Rock Lives" held an annual "Hungerthon" every Thanksgiving, to benefit Harry Chapin's World Hunger League. During the 24-hour period of the event, little to no music was played, with the exception of "Alice's Restaurant" by Arlo Guthrie played at noon and 6 P.M. For the remainder of the day, during every DJ's four-hour show, guests such as Harry himself, other music stars, and experts on hunger brought to the listeners information about the severity of hunger in America, in New York City, and in the tri-state area, sometimes in graphic detail.

After Chapin's death, the "Hungerthon" continued, and on July 13, 1985, at the U.S. leg of the Live Aid concert in Philadelphia at JFK Stadium, Kenny Loggins was presented with the first "Harry Chapin Humanitarian Award" by actor Jeff Bridges for his work for the World Hunger League in fighting hunger in America. Since WNEW-FM changed formats, other New York stations have continued to do fundraisers for the charity. In 1987, singer Kenny Rogers was awarded the first-ever "ASCAP Harry Chapin Humanitarian Award" from the American Society of Composers, Authors and Publishers (ASCAP). Since 1987, the ASCAP Harry Chapin Humanitarian Award has been bestowed more than 20 times to various artists for their various "humanitarian contributions." The ASCAP awards are now presented by Why Hunger, the organization originally co-founded by Harry Chapin and Bill Ayres as World Hunger Year.

Four additional organizations once presented awards in the name of Harry Chapin in the past. They include the National Association of Recording Merchandisers (NARM) Harry Chapin Memorial Humanitarian Award—now known as the Music Business Association or MusicBiz, the Harry Chapin Award for Contributions to Humanity by the National Association for Campus Activities (NACA), the Harry Chapin Humanitarian Award for Community Service from the Long Island Association, and the Harry Chapin Humanitarian Award by Long Island Cares.

Before his death, Chapin had worked with Peter M. Coan for several years on Chapin's biography, Taxi: The Harry Chapin Story. Soon after Chapin's death, his estate notified Coan that he must return all materials related to the book and that he "no longer had the rights to the book-in-progress". Coan sued the estate, receiving a $65,000 settlement in 1990. Taxi: The Harry Chapin Story was published in September 1990.

The Lakeside Theatre at Eisenhower Park in East Meadow, New York, was renamed Harry Chapin Lakeside Theatre during a memorial concert held one month after his death, as a tribute to his efforts to combat world hunger. Other Long Island landmarks named in honor of Chapin include a graduate-student apartment complex at Stony Brook University, a theater in Heckscher Park in Huntington, New York, and a playground at the intersection of Columbia Heights and Middagh Street in Brooklyn Heights.

The village of Croton-on-Hudson, New York, has hosted the Harry Chapin Run Against Hunger, a 10k, 5k, and fun run, since 1981.

On December 7, 1987, on what would have been his 45th birthday, Chapin was posthumously awarded the Congressional Gold Medal for his campaigning on social issues, particularly his highlighting of hunger around the world and in the United States.

In 1994, the 11-year-old Southwest Florida Food Bank (Fort Myers, FL) was renamed the Harry Chapin Food Bank of Southwest Florida, in tribute to Chapin, and with the permission of his widow.

In 2001, Chapin's "Cat's in the Cradle" was ranked number 186 of 365 on the Recording Industry Association of America list of Songs of the Century.

Chapin was inducted into the Long Island Music Hall of Fame on October 15, 2006.

On September 27, 2011, former U.S. Representative Alan Grayson wrote an article on The Huffington Post about Chapin's song "What Made America Famous".

Singer and songwriter Guthrie Thomas has said that Chapin's song "Cat's in the Cradle" is one of the most difficult songs to perform, due to Chapin's guitar playing and his syncopation of the lyrics, meaning each word must fit perfectly and in time with the playing.

James Dobson quoted the entirety of "Cat's in the Cradle" to illustrate dynamics of contemporary American families.

A children's picture book was created using the lyrics of "Mr. Tanner" and the illustrations of Bryan Langdo; it was published by Ripple Grove Press in May 2017.

Greenwich Entertainment released a documentary film titled Harry Chapin: When in Doubt, Do Something. It was directed by Rick Korn and produced by Jason Chapin. It was released theatrically and through virtual cinema on October 16, 2020 (World Food Day).

== Family ==
Chapin's widow Sandra Chapin is chair of the Harry Chapin Foundation. Their son, Josh, is involved with the foundation, along with other family members.

Chapin's father Jim, brothers Tom and Steve, and daughter Jen Chapin are musicians, while his nieces, Abigail and Lily Chapin, perform under the name the Chapin Sisters. His paternal grandfather, James Ormsbee Chapin, was an artist who illustrated Robert Frost's first two books of poetry; his maternal grandfather was the philosopher and rhetorician Kenneth Burke.

Chapin's brothers sometimes performed with Harry at various times throughout his career, particularly during live performances. They played with him before his solo career took off, and were credited on the albums Greatest Stories Live, Legends of the Lost and Found, and Chapin Music! Tom and Steve continued to perform together (often with Harry's former bandmates) occasionally after his death.

Country singer Mary Chapin Carpenter is Chapin's fifth cousin.

== Awards and recognition ==
Grammy Awards

Year	Nominee / work	Award	Result
1972	"Taxi"	Best New Artist of the Year	Nominated
1975	"Cat's in the Cradle"	Best Pop Male Vocal Performance	Nominated
1986	Harry Chapin	President's Merit Award	Won
2011	Harry Chapin	Hall of Fame Award	Won

Rock Music Awards

Year	Nominee / work	Award	Result
1976	Harry Chapin	Public Service Award	Won

Billboard

Year	Nominee / work	Award	Result
1973	Harry Chapin	Trendsetter Award	Won

Rockies

Year	Nominee / work	Award	Result
1976	Harry Chapin	Public Service Award	Won
1977	Harry Chapin	Public Service Award	Won

=== Other awards and honors ===
- Harry Chapin ASCAP Award
- Congressional Gold Medal of Honor
- Long Island Music Hall of Fame
- Ten Outstanding Young Americans, 1977

== Discography ==
=== Studio albums ===
- Heads & Tales (1972, Elektra)
- Sniper and Other Love Songs (1972, Elektra)
- Short Stories (1973, Elektra)
- Verities & Balderdash (1974, Elektra)
- Portrait Gallery (1975, Elektra)
- On the Road to Kingdom Come (1976, Elektra)
- Dance Band on the Titanic (Double Album, 1977, Elektra)
- Living Room Suite (1978, Elektra)
- Sequel (1980, Boardwalk Records)
  - Re-released as Remember When the Music with bonus tracks (1987, Dunhill Compact Classics)
  - Storyteller (1999, BOA Records, a re-release of Sequel)
- The Last Protest Singer (1988, Posthumous, Dunhill Compact Classics)

=== Live albums ===
- Greatest Stories Live (Double Album, 1976, Elektra)
- Legends of the Lost and Found (Double Live Album, 1979, Elektra)

=== Compilation albums ===
- Anthology of Harry Chapin (1985, Elektra)
- The Gold Medal Collection (1988, Elektra)
- Harry Chapin Tribute (1990, Relativity Records)
- The Bottom Line Encore Collection (1998, Bottom Line / Koch)
- Story of a Life (1999, Elektra)
- Onwards and Upwards (2000, Harry Chapin Foundation)
- VH1 Behind the Music: The Harry Chapin Collection (2001, Elektra)
- Songwriter (2002, Harry Chapin Foundation)
- The Essentials (2002, Elektra)
- Classic Hits of Harry Chapin (2003, Warner Special Products)
- Heads & Tales / Sniper and Other Love Songs (2004, Elektra. Double CD re-release of first two albums with bonus tracks)
- Introducing ... Harry Chapin (2006, Rhino Records)
- Bottom Line Archive Series: Live 1981 (2015, The Bottom Line Record Company)
- The Singles A's & B's (2019, Wounded Bird Records)

=== Singles ===
- "Taxi"
- "Could You Put Your Light On, Please"
- "Sunday Morning Sunshine"
- "A Better Place to Be"
- "W.O.L.D."
- "Cat's in the Cradle"
- "What Made America Famous?"
- "I Wanna Learn a Love Song"
- "Dreams Go By"
- "A Better Place to Be (Live)"
- "Flowers Are Red"
- "Sequel"
- "Remember When the Music"
- "Story of a Life"

== Video / DVD releases ==
- An Evening With ... Harry Chapin (also known as "The Book of Chapin") (1998)
- Rockpalast Live (2002)
- Remember When: The Anthology (2005)
- You Are the Only Song (also known as "The Final Concert") (2006)
- Cotton Patch Gospel

== Bibliography ==
- Looking ... Seeing (1975)
