= Story of a Life (song) =

1980 single by Harry Chapin

Single by Harry Chapin

from the album Sequel
- B-side: "Salt and Pepper"
- Released: 1981
- Recorded: 1980
- Genre: Pop rock
- Length: 5:15
- Label: Boardwalk
- Songwriter: Harry Chapin
- Producers: Howard Albert; Ron Albert

Harry Chapin singles chronology
"Remember When the Music" (1980)	"Story of a Life" (1981)

"Story of a Life" is a song written and performed by Harry Chapin, from the album Sequel. The song is the final single released from the album, and Chapin's final single before his death in July 1981. When released, it became a hit on the Billboard Bubbling Under Hot 100. Peaking at 105, it stayed on the chart for five weeks making all three singles from the album hits. It has been included on numerous anthology releases.

== Background ==
When talking about the song, Chapin says that he wrote it in a romantic mood. He explains that he came up with the song when he was flying home in a jet when there was a storm and his life flashed before his eyes.

== Chart performance ==
Chart (1981)	Peak position
U.S. Billboard Bubbling Under Hot 100	105

== Different versions ==
The song has an alternate version that was previously unreleased. The alternate version was released on the Onwards and Upwards album.

== Other uses ==
- Harry's brother, Tom Chapin covered the song.
- It was included on the Lies and Legends cast recording.
