= David McLees =

British architectural historian (1945–2020)

Alexander David McLees (9 November 1945 – 14 June 2020) was a British architectural historian. From 1998 to 2001, he was a director in the Executive Committee of the Society of Architectural Historians of Great Britain (SAHGB).

== Early life and education ==
Alexander David McLees was born in St Andrews Fife, Scotland. He was the son of Mary Adamson Syrmington, a school teacher, and Alexander Gray McLees, the deputy rector in Madras College in St Andrews. This is where McLees and his older sister Margaret completed their studies. During his school years, McLees played on the college rugby team from 1962 to 1964, and in 1964 he won the college's Coronation Medal for History.

In 1969 he was awarded a Master of Arts degree by the Courtauld Institute of Art in London, where he wrote his MA dissertation on parish church architecture in Gloucestershire.

== Work and research ==
After his MA, McLees kept on researching British architecture. In 1972, McLees won the Reginald Taylor and Lord Fletcher essay prize from the British Archaeological Association and six years later, in 1978, he became a fellow of the Society of Antiquaries of Scotland.

McLees’ most circulated work is perhaps the Cadw guide to Castell Coch, written in 1988. The guide proved popular and has had two further editions: one published in 2005, and the other in 2018. In his research of the archives, he discovered previously unseen photographies of the castle, showing that Castell Coch had commercial vineyards before the 1930s- making it a rare case in Britain.

After this first collaboration with Cadw, McLees became an Inspector of Historical Buildings for the Welsh agency. McLees worked for Cadw again in 2013 in a campaign to preserve traditional Welsh terraced houses. He wrote a booklet about the historical value of such houses, with guidance on their care and preservation. McLees died in June 2020.

== Bibliography ==
- McLees, A. D. (1969). Parish architecture in Gloucestershire (MA). London: Courtauld Institute of Art.
- McLees, D. (1972) 'Henry Yevele: disposer of the King's Works of masonry' (JBAA, 3rd ser., XXXVI (1973), 52-72).
- McLees, D. (1988). Castell Coch. Cadw.
- Jeremy Knight, John B. Hilling, Jeremy Knight, Jeremy Knight, Jack Spurgeon, Keith Kissack, John R. Kenyon & David McLees (1993) Castles, Archaeological Journal, 150:sup1, 26-43, DOI: 10.1080/00665983.1993.11785942.
