= Heads & Tales (album) =

Studio album by Harry Chapin
- Released: March 1972
- Studio: Elektra, Los Angeles, California
- Genre: Rock
- Length: 45:39
- Label: Elektra
- Producer: Jac Holzman

Harry Chapin chronology
Chapin Music (1966)	Heads & Tales (1972)	Sniper and Other Love Songs (1972)

Singles from Heads & Tales
- 1. "Taxi" Released: March 1972; 2. "Could You Put Your Light On, Please" Released: March 1972

Professional ratings
Review scores
Source	Rating
AllMusic	4.5/5 stars
Christgau's Record Guide	C−

Heads & Tales is the first studio album by the American singer/songwriter Harry Chapin, released in 1972. The album contains Chapin's first hit, "Taxi." The album and single both charted successfully for over six months, with both selling over 1 million copies each.

Early LP pressings of Heads & Tales featured a die-cut front cover with a square hole in it, allowing the "cover" photo of Chapin (which is actually on an enclosed poster/lyric sheet) to be seen through the hole, creating a three-dimensional effect.

"Taxi" was released as a 45 rpm single, and charted at number 24 on the Billboard Hot 100.

== Track listing ==
Side one
No.	Title	Length
1.	"Could You Put Your Light On, Please"	4:30
2.	"Greyhound"	5:45
3.	"Everybody's Lonely"	4:07
4.	"Sometime, Somewhere Wife"	4:58
5.	"Empty""	2:57

Side two
No.	Title	Length
1.	"Taxi"	6:44
2.	"Any Old Kind of Day"	4:56
3.	"Dogtown"	7:30
4.	"Same Sad Singer"	4:12

== Personnel ==
- Harry Chapin - guitar, vocals
- Steve Chapin - keyboards
- Russ Kunkel - drums, percussion
- Ronald Palmer - guitar, vocals
- Tim Scott - cello
- John Wallace - bass, vocals

== Charts and certifications ==
=== Charts ===
Year	Chart	Position
1972	Billboard Top LP's	60
1972	Australian (Kent Music Report)	36
1972	Canadian Albums Chart	57

=== Certifications ===
Region	Certification	Sales
United States	Gold	1,000,000
Canada	Platinum	100,000
