= Sniper and Other Love Songs =

Sniper & Other Love Songs

Studio album by Harry Chapin
- Released: October 1972
- Recorded: 1972
- Studio: Elektra, Los Angeles, California
- Length: 45:52
- Label: Elektra
- Producer: Fred Kewley

Harry Chapin chronology
Heads & Tales (1972)	Sniper & Other Love Songs (1972)	Short Stories (1973)

Singles from Sniper and Other Love Songs
- 1. "Sunday Morning Sunshine" Released: October 1972; 2. "A Better Place to Be" Released: October 1972

Professional ratings
Review scores
Source	Rating
AllMusic	4/5 stars

Sniper and Other Love Songs is the second studio album by the American singer/songwriter Harry Chapin, released in 1972. The album's title song is a vaguely fictionalised account of Charles Whitman's shootings from the clocktower of the Main Building of the University of Texas at Austin in August 1966. In 2004 it was released as a double CD package with Heads & Tales featuring several previously unreleased out-takes.

The song "Circle" was a major hit for The New Seekers (released as "Circles") and became known as the Chapin Anthem. "Sunday Morning Sunshine" cracked the Billboard Hot 100. A live version of "A Better Place To Be" charted in 1976.

== Track listing ==
Side one
No.	Title	Length
1.	"Sunday Morning Sunshine"	3:51
2.	"Sniper"	9:58
3.	"And the Baby Never Cries"	5:09
4.	"Burning Herself"	3:30

Side two
No.	Title	Length
1.	"Barefoot Boy"	3:29
2.	"A Better Place to Be"	8:36
3.	"Circle"	3:24
4.	"Woman Child"	5:24
5.	"Winter Song"	2:31

== Personnel ==
- Harry Chapin - guitar, vocals
- John Wallace - bass, vocals
- Tim Scott - cello
- Ron Palmer - lead guitar, vocals
- Steve Chapin - keyboards
- Russ Kunkel - drums and percussion

== Charts ==
Year	Chart	Peak Position
1972	Billboard Top LPs	160

== See also ==
- 1972 in music
