= Sandra Chapin =

American songwriter

Sandra Campbell Chapin (née Gaston; born 1934) is an American poet/songwriter and activist. She is best known for her songwriting collaborations with her second husband, singer-songwriter Harry Chapin, and is also the mother of singer Jen Chapin.

== Marriages ==
Her first husband was lawyer James John Cashmore, son of longtime Borough of Brooklyn (New York) president John Cashmore. She was working as a teacher at the time. They had three children together. She divorced him to marry Harry Chapin, who was her guitar instructor. They married on November 26, 1968 and had two children: Jennifer and Joshua. The story of their meeting and romance is dramatized in his song "I Wanna Learn a Love Song".

== Songwriting ==
She wrote poems and helped Chapin write songs for the television show Make a Wish. She helped write lyrics to several of Chapin's songs, including the well-known "Cat's in the Cradle". Chapin wrote several songs about her, including "Shooting Star" and "Sandy."

== Lawsuits ==
She was involved in several lawsuits after Chapin's death: Negligence suits related to the car accident that took his life and suits over his biography and a possible film of his life.

== Charity ==
She accepted Chapin's Congressional Gold Medal and has worked to ensure his charities continued to function after his death. She is chairperson of the charity Long Island Cares and of The Harry Chapin Foundation.
