= I Wanna Learn a Love Song =

Single by Harry Chapin

from the album Verities & Balderdash
- B-side: "She Sings Songs Without Words"
- Released: August 1974
- Recorded: 1974
- Genre: Folk rock
- Length: 4:19
- Label: Elektra
- Songwriter: Harry Chapin
- Producer: Paul Leka

Harry Chapin singles chronology
"What Made America Famous?" (1974)	"I Wanna Learn a Love Song" (1974)	"Dreams Go By" (1975)

"I Wanna Learn a Love Song" is a song written and performed by Harry Chapin. The song was included on his 1974 album Verities & Balderdash. The song is about a guitar teacher who gives guitar lessons to a woman who is falling in love with him.

== Background ==
The song is a true story about how Chapin met his wife Sandra. The song starts out showing a guitar teacher who only has his guitar to "Keep his belly still". For each lesson, he got a "crisp ten dollar bill". The woman in the song says that she wants to play the guitar and hear her children sing with her. As the song goes on, he tried to teach her some chords, but she only wants to listen to him and his guitar. He can hear her husband in his den, "playing stud poker with the boys". Finally, she met him at the door when the "den was dark" suggesting her husband had left. Toward the end of the song, it is implied that he and the woman had sex. There was a significant change to the first verse when Harry performed live—the album "Greatest Stories Live" Is an example of this, where the second and fourth lines of the first verse are altered to a more "adult" version. Instead of "Lean and lazy/And a little bit crazy" the live version Is "Crass and Corny/And a little bit horny"

Cash Box called it an "intriguing short story" that "teaches us a lesson about life and love and it's eminently listenable," saying that it has a "great sing-along chorus and a big production."

== Simple Song ==
Simple Song is an unreleased version of the song. It was removed from the album Sniper and Other Love Songs.. The song itself is very much similar to "I Wanna Learn a Love Song", with some lyrical changes and is sung in a much softer voice. The song was released in a 2004 double album with Sniper and Other Love Songs and Heads & Tales, but only in Europe. It included a total of eight unreleased tracks (one from Heads & Tales and seven from Sniper and Other Love Songs).

== Chart performance ==
=== Weekly charts ===
Chart (1974–75)	Peak position
Australia	75
Canada	36
Canada AC	14
U.S. Billboard Adult Contemporary	7
U.S. Billboard Hot 100	44
U.S. Cash Box Top 100	40

=== Year-end charts ===
Chart (1975)	Peak position
U.S. Billboard Hot 100	276

== Other uses ==
- Donna Fargo created a version of the song with virtually the same lyrics, but from the woman's point of view.
- José Feliciano covered the song on his 1974 album For My Love…Mother Music that uses the “corny”/“horny” lyric. This version was curiously released a few months before Harry Chapin and was performed live as early as December 1973 at the Midnight Special show
