= Flowers Are Red =

Single by Harry Chapin

from the album Living Room Suite
- B-side: "Jenny"
- Released: September 10, 1978
- Recorded: 1977–1978
- Genre: Folk rock, soft rock
- Length: 4:56
- Label: Elektra
- Songwriter: Harry Chapin
- Producer: Chuck Plotkin

Harry Chapin singles chronology
| "Dance Band on the Titanic" (1977) | "Flowers Are Red" (1978) | "Sequel" (1980) |

"Flowers Are Red" is a folk song written and sung by Harry Chapin, and recorded for his 1978 album Living Room Suite. It was released a single, and became a top 20 Irish hit.

== Content ==
The song tells the story of a little boy who on the first day of school started drawing pictures of flowers using many different colors. The teacher (sung by Chapin in a falsetto voice) is angry, so she tells him that he should not be coloring because it is not time for art, and in any case, the boy is coloring the flowers all wrong and that he should paint them red and green, "the way they always have been seen." The boy disagrees and continues to color them from his imagination until the teacher punishes him by standing him in a corner. Finally, the now terrified little boy gives in and tells the teacher that "flowers are red, and green leaves are green." Years later, the little boy moves towns and attends a different school, a new teacher encourages her students to use all sorts of colors, only to find the student only coloring his flowers red and green; when the new teacher asks the boy why, he meekly responds by quoting his previous teacher—"flowers are red, and green leaves are green."

In the live concert versions, Chapin extended the song's ending to: "There still must be a way to have our children say..." before featuring the little boy's chorus again and bringing the song to a better conclusion. A version of this is featured on his 1979 live album Legends of the Lost and Found.

== Origin ==
The idea for the song came to Chapin when his secretary told him about her son who brought his report card home from school one day. The teacher had written a note in the card saying: "Your son is marching to the beat of a different drummer, but don't worry we will soon have him joining the parade by the end of the term." The quote was often used as an introduction to the song during live performances, with the comma after "drummer" being pronounced as a word because of the educational theme.

The lyrics Harry Chapin wrote are similar to a poem by Helen E Buckley called "The Little Boy" originally published in the School Arts Magazine in 1961.

== In popular culture ==
On Jerry Seinfeld's web series "Comedians in Cars Getting Coffee, guest Sarah Jessica Parker relates that she and her siblings were the uncredited background singers for the child part of the song's chorus.
