= Dreams Go By =

Single by Harry Chapin

from the album Portrait Gallery
- Released: September 1975
- Recorded: 1975
- Genre: Folk rock
- Length: 3:48
- Label: Elektra Records
- Songwriter: Harry Chapin
- Producer: Paul Leka

Harry Chapin singles chronology
"I Wanna Learn a Love Song" (1974)	"Dreams Go By" (1975)	"A Better Place to Be (Live)" (1976)

"Dreams Go By" is a song written and performed by Harry Chapin. The song was included on his 1975 album, Portrait Gallery. It tells the story of a man and woman who fall in love in their youth, marry in adulthood, and have grandchildren by their old age, all while prioritizing living normal, stable lives at the cost of giving up their greater aspirations, which they come to regret by the end. The song became a top 40 adult contemporary hit, peaking at #33 on the Billboard Easy Listening chart, where it stayed for two weeks.

Record World said that "the kind of delayed gratification that parents have been urging upon children since time began takes on a distinctively different hue here in this family-based classic" and that "broken dreams are pieced back together with much Chapin insight."

== Chart performance ==
=== Weekly charts ===
Chart (1975–76)	Peak position
U.S. Billboard Easy Listening	33
Australia	81
Canada RPM AC (2wks@31)	31
