= Remember When the Music (song) =

1980 single by Harry Chapin

Single by Harry Chapin

from the album Sequel
- B-side: "Northwest 222"
- Released: 1980
- Recorded: 1980
- Genre: Pop rock
- Length: 3:51
- Label: Boardwalk
- Songwriter(s): Harry Chapin
- Producer(s): Howard Albert; Ron Albert

Harry Chapin singles chronology
"Sequel" (1980)	"Remember When the Music" (1980)	"Story of a Life" (1981)

"Remember When the Music" is a song written and performed by Harry Chapin, from the album Sequel. The song is the next chronological single from his hit single, "Sequel" from the same album. It reached the top 50 on the Billboard Adult Contemporary chart and spent five weeks on the chart.

== Background ==
The song was written as a tribute to Allard K. Lowenstein, a former New York congressman who was shot and killed in 1980. Chapin stated that the song became more apparent when John Lennon was killed the same year.

== Chart performance ==
Chart (1980–81)	Peak position
U.S. Billboard Adult Contemporary	47

== Different versions ==
The song has three different versions. It consists of a reprise, which is an acoustic take on the song. The second version is the regular song, that was released as a single. The third version is very similar to the second version, with only minor differences.

== Other uses ==
- Bruce Springsteen sang the song at the Harry Chapin Tribute concert.
