= Sniper (song) =

1972 song by Harry Chapin

"Sniper" is a ballad written by Harry Chapin and first released on the album Sniper and Other Love Songs in 1972.

== Overview ==
The song, nearly 10 minutes long, is based on the University of Texas tower shooting in 1966, with some fictional elements. The song does not name the actual sniper, Charles Whitman, or the location. The victims' names have also been changed.

Harry wrote this piece using three distinct "voices" for dramatic effect. Chapin sings all three voices. The first is the narrator, telling the story. The second is a variety of people reacting to the event, as if in response to news media questions. And the third voice is that of the Sniper himself, stating his fears, his motives, and his raw emotions. Throughout the song, the time signature changes several times, with variations in tempo, identifying and supporting the three different voices. The narrator begins by describing the Sniper climbing the stairs of the tower, "two bulky suitcases hang[ing] from his hands," who then begins shooting at people on the streets below. We hear the public's response and descriptions of the Sniper by those who knew him. The narrator returns and this cycle begins again. Eventually the Sniper pours out his pain over the failed relationship between himself and his mother, who had ignored him as a child.

In the end, the sniper is killed by police officers who have climbed the tower. The sniper's last words – "I was, I am, and now I will be" – lend insight into the psychology of the sniper, who has been on a lifelong quest for self actualization.
