= Mr. Tanner =

"Mr. Tanner" is a song by Harry Chapin from his 1973 album, Short Stories. Big John Wallace plays Mr. Tanner by singing the chorus to "O Holy Night" in the background to the song's chorus.

== Story ==
The song tells the story of Martin Tanner, a local launderer from Dayton, Ohio, who has a gift for singing. His friends try to talk him into becoming a singer because of his beautiful voice, until he finally agrees and uses most of his savings to travel to New York City and sing in a show. He holds a concert only to get panned by critics. He returns home and never sings again, except for only to himself when he sorts through the clothes at night.

== Origin ==
The song is based on a review Chapin read in The New York Times. The singer, Martin Tubridy, performed twice, once in 1971 and once in 1972 and his performances were panned. It is unclear which article was the basis for the song of Mr. Tanner, as it seems both reviews are used in the spoken part in Mr. Tanner. Certain details of the song were improvised by Chapin, given the fact that the real-life Martin Tubridy, about whom the reviews were written, was not from Dayton, nor did he work as a launderer, but rather a baritone from Weston, Connecticut who at one point rented Carnegie Hall and continued to perform in theater and local venues despite the earlier indifferent critical reception of his New York performances. Tubridy himself did not know that he was the inspiration for Chapin's song until the mid-1990s, but upon learning of it, became a fan of Chapin's music. Tubridy would later perform the song that he inspired before an audience in concert for the Harry Chapin Foundation, making a subtle shift in the lyrics of the final line of the song's chorus, "He did not know how well he sang, it just made me whole."
