= A Better Place to Be =

1972 song performed by Harry Chapin

Single by Harry Chapin

from the album Sniper and Other Love Songs
- Released: October 1972
- Recorded: 1972
- Genre: Folk rock
- Length: 8:36
- Label: Elektra
- Songwriter: Harry Chapin
- Producer: Fred Kewley

Harry Chapin singles chronology
| "Sunday Morning Sunshine" (1972) | "A Better Place to Be" (1972) | "W.O.L.D." (1973) |

"A Better Place to Be" is a song by Harry Chapin from his 1972 album, Sniper and Other Love Songs. The song is about a midnight watchman confiding in a waitress, while drinking gin, about a woman that he met a week before and had a one-night stand with.

Released as a single, the song reached No. 18 on the Billboard Bubbling Under chart. A live version, from the 1976 album Greatest Stories Live, reached No. 86 on the Hot 100 chart.

Record World called it a "distinctive Chapin narrative, this time a downbeat tale about two lonely people."

According to Chapin, it was his favorite song that he wrote.

== Story ==
At a bar, an overweight but friendly waitress notices a "little man" sitting and looking glum. When asked what his problem is, the man ignores the waitress at first, but after drinking some gin, he begins to tell her his story.

The song then takes the man's point of view as he states that he is a midnight watchman at a business called Miller's Tool & Die. One week earlier, he goes to a diner and sees a beautiful woman. Though worried that she might not be interested in him, the man still attempts to speak to her. He stammers, but the woman takes his offer for a relationship, expressing her desire for her life to have some direction and purpose.

The man takes her home and attempts to turn on the lights as he enters his room, but the she tells him to leave the lights off and undresses for him. The little man cannot believe his good luck, and tries again to speak to the girl, who invites him to bed, commenting that being in a relationship is better than being lonely.

The next day, the little man watches her sleep and leaves early so he can return and surprise her with breakfast. When he returns, he finds she has gone, leaving behind a note saying, "It's time that I moved on."

After the man's story, the tearful waitress tells him she wishes that she too were beautiful so she could go home with him. Upon finishing his drink, the man acknowledges their shared loneliness and offers to go home with her if she wants him to do so.

Many of the other songs on Chapin's album Sniper and Other Love Songs were about the life experiences of others. Although the "early morning bar room" and factory are not named, Watertown, New York has a saloon district adjacent to factories.

== Charts ==
=== Weekly charts ===
| Chart (1972–1973) | Peak position |
|---|---|
| Canadian Adult Contemporary | 51 |
| US Bubbling Under Hot 100 Singles | 118 |

== Live version ==
"A Better Place to Be (Live)"

Single by Harry Chapin

from the album Greatest Stories Live
- Released: April 1976
- Recorded: 1976
- Genre: Folk rock
- Length: 9:17
- Label: Elektra
- Songwriter: Harry Chapin
- Producers: Stephen Chapin; Fred Kewley; Paul Leka

Harry Chapin singles chronology
| "Dreams Go By" (1975) | "A Better Place to Be (Live)" (1976) | "Dance Band on the Titanic" (1977) |

The song was released as a single on the live album, Greatest Stories Live. While introducing the song, Chapin states he came up with the song while visiting Watertown, New York, claiming he "spent a week there one afternoon". The live version was, until 2015 (when David Bowie's "Blackstar" took the title), the longest song to chart on the Billboard Hot 100.

== Chart performance ==
=== Weekly charts ===
| Chart (1976) | Peak position |
|---|---|
| Canada RPM Top Singles | 80 |
| US Billboard Hot 100 | 86 |

=== Year-end charts ===
| Chart (1976) | Position |
|---|---|
| US Billboard Hot 100 | 456 |
