= W.O.L.D. =

"W·O·L·D"

Single by Harry Chapin

from the album Short Stories
- B-side: "Short Stories"
- Released: December 1973
- Recorded: 1973
- Genre: Folk rock
- Length: 5:15
- Label: Elektra
- Songwriter: Harry Chapin
- Producer: Paul Leka

Harry Chapin singles chronology
"A Better Place to Be" (1972)	"W·O·L·D" (1973)	"Cat's in the Cradle" (1974)

"W.O.L.D." is a song written and performed by Harry Chapin. The song is about an aging disc jockey who travels the United States seeking happiness, which he believes he will find by following his passion for being a radio DJ, only to discover that his life, looks, and voice have all passed him by, as hinted in the OLD of the title.

The song is sung through the point of view of a phone call conversation from the DJ to his ex-wife, only hearing what he has to say to her.

== Inspiration ==
The hit song was inspired by radio personality Jim Connors, who is credited for having discovered Chapin and promoted his hit, "Taxi", through Boston radio station WMEX, where he was the morning drive-time host. After the debut of "Taxi", Chapin sat in on a phone conversation Connors was having with his ex-wife while in a studio at WMEX. This conversation led to a deep and personal discussion during an interview both on and off the air between the men. They talked about life, the business, marriage, divorce, happiness, and all the troubles associated with being a DJ and the music business at the time.

The song describes the often transitory and difficult lives of radio personalities, whose careers may require them to move from city to city. After losing his job due to age discrimination (as suggested by the call letters "W-OLD" and "they said that they like the young sound when they let me go"), the singer leaves his family to spend eight years in gigs in Tulsa and then Boise before having the opportunity to again work in his home city. However, upon returning, his overtures to reunite with his ex-wife are summarily rebuffed, as she has moved on with her life.

WOLD-FM is an actual radio station in Marion, Virginia, which went on the air in 1968, five years before Chapin recorded the song.

When performing the song live, Chapin frequently replaced WOLD in the last verse with the call letters of a local station in the town where the performance was held. The live version of the song from the compilation The Gold Medal Collection has an example of this: WOLD was replaced with KHJ, a station in Los Angeles.

== Commercial performance ==
The song, included on the album Short Stories, peaked on the US charts at number 36 in March 1974 and at number 34 in the UK. However, when Chapin performed it on the Greatest Stories Live album, he jokingly said that the song actually charted for "15 minutes." It was also notable in Canada, reaching number 14 and number 9. The song charted in multiple other countries in the top 20. It went on to sell over a million units.

== Charts ==
=== Weekly charts ===
Chart (1973–1974)	Peak position
Australia	21
Canada RPM Top Singles	14
Canadian Adult Contemporary	9
Netherlands (Dutch Top 40)	25
New Zealand (Listener)	16
UK Singles Chart	34
US Billboard Hot 100	36
US Billboard Adult Contemporary	37
US Cash Box Top 100	26

=== Year-end charts ===
Chart (1974)	Position
Australia	149
Canada	141
US Billboard Hot 100	226
