= Cat's in the Cradle =

1974 single by Harry Chapin

- Side-A label of the US vinyl single

Single by Harry Chapin

from the album Verities & Balderdash
- B-side: "Vacancy"
- Released: October 1, 1974
- Studio: Connecticut (Bridgeport, Connecticut)
- Genre: Folk rock; soft rock
- Length: 3:45 (album version); 3:29 (single version)
- Label: Elektra
- Songwriters: Harry Chapin; Sandra Chapin
- Producer: Paul Leka

Harry Chapin singles chronology
"W.O.L.D." (1973)	"Cat's in the Cradle" (1974)	"What Made America Famous?" (1974)

"Cat's in the Cradle" is a folk rock song by American singer-songwriter Harry Chapin, from his fourth studio album, Verities & Balderdash (1974). The single topped the US Billboard Hot 100 in December 1974. As Chapin's only number-one song, it became his signature song and a staple for folk rock music. Chapin's recording of the song was nominated for the 1975 Grammy Award for Best Male Pop Vocal Performance and was inducted into the Grammy Hall of Fame in 2011.

== Composition and background ==
"Cat's in the Cradle" is narrated by a man who becomes a father in the first stanza. He is constantly too busy with his work to spend time with his son, despite his son looking up to him and promising he will grow up to be just like him. When the son graduates from college, he declines his father's offer to relax with him and instead asks for the car keys. In the final stanza, the now-retired father calls his adult son and asks to spend some time together, but the son is now too busy with his own work and family to spend time with his dad, and the father realizes his son has indeed grown up to be just like him.

The chorus references the children's game cat's cradle, silver spoons as traditional baby gifts, as well as the nursery rhymes Little Boy Blue and The Man in the Moon.

The song's lyrics began as a poem written by Chapin's wife, Sandra "Sandy" Gaston; the poem itself was inspired by the awkward relationship between her first husband, James Cashmore, and his father, John, a politician who served as Brooklyn borough president. She was also inspired by a country music song she had heard on the radio. Chapin also said the song was about his own relationship with his son, Josh, admitting, "Frankly, this song scares me to death."

== Misattribution ==
Many misattribute the song to British singer-songwriter Cat Stevens, likely due to mistitled MP3 files circulating on file sharing services, but in fact he neither wrote nor performed it. The confusion may originate with the fact that Stevens's record label did release an unrelated compilation album entitled Cat's Cradle in 1977. In later years, Stevens joked that the song had "been haunting me for years" (referencing the misconception). He included it in a list of his favorite songs about children, saying: "It reflects the dilemma of many homes. A beautiful song."

== Reception ==
Cash Box called it "a tender story of a father and his son and a perfect representation of how roles change in the relationship over the years," stating it was a "lyrical delight." Record World said that the song "deals with the preoccupations plaguing parenthood" and that it "bridges the generation gap by pointing up mutual faults."

== Charts ==
=== Weekly charts ===
Chart (1974–1975)	Peak position
Australia (Kent Music Report)	6
Canada Top Singles (RPM)	3
Canada Adult Contemporary (RPM)	1
US Billboard Hot 100	1
US Adult Contemporary (Billboard)	6
US Cash Box Top 100	1

=== Year-end charts ===
Chart (1974)	Position
Canada Top Singles (RPM)	99

Chart (1975)	Position
Australia (Kent Music Report)	51
US Billboard Hot 100	38

== Certifications ==
Region	Certification	Certified units/sales
Canada (Music Canada)	2× Platinum	160,000^{‡}
New Zealand (RMNZ)	Platinum	30,000^{‡}
United Kingdom (BPI)	Silver	200,000^{‡}
United States (RIAA)	2× Platinum	2,000,000^{‡}
^{‡} Sales+streaming figures based on certification alone.

== Ugly Kid Joe version ==
"Cats in the Cradle"

Single by Ugly Kid Joe

from the album America's Least Wanted
- Released: February 21, 1993 (Australia)
- Genre: Hard rock
- Length: 4:01
- Label: Mercury; Stardog
- Songwriters: Harry Chapin; Sandra Chapin
- Producer: Mark Dodson

Ugly Kid Joe singles chronology
"So Damn Cool" (1992)	"Cats in the Cradle" (1993)	"Busy Bee" (1993)

Music video
- "Cats in the Cradle" on YouTube

In 1992, American hard rock band Ugly Kid Joe included a cover of the song, renamed "Cats in the Cradle" (without the apostrophe), on their debut album, America's Least Wanted (1992). The cover was produced by Mark Dodson and issued as a single in 1993 by Mercury Records. It experienced commercial success, becoming a top-10 hit in numerous countries. The accompanying music video was directed by American illustrator, photographer and film director Matt Mahurin.

=== Critical reception ===
AllMusic editor Stephen Thomas Erlewine remarked on the band's "revamped" version of the song. Mary Lynn White from Calgary Herald said their version "proves you're deep too." Jason Fliegel from The Cavalier Daily felt the band has redone the song "in its own unique style". Deborah Frost of Entertainment Weekly called it a "scarily straight" cover. Steve Hochman of Los Angeles Times said, "Turning Harry Chapin's 'Cat's in the Cradle' into a power ballad was a bad idea to begin with; making it sound neither snotty nor particularly sincere only compounds the error." Tom Ford from Toledo Blade wrote that they "do an excellent job", "adding power to the sing-song chorus, and a crashing finale that removes its coffeehouse patina."

=== Commercial performance ===
"Cats in the Cradle" peaked at number six on the US Billboard Hot 100, giving Ugly Kid Joe their highest-charting single on the ranking. The song also reached number three on the Billboard Album Rock Tracks chart and number 11 on the Top 40/Mainstream chart. The single sold 500,000 copies domestically, earning a gold certification from the Recording Industry Association of America (RIAA).

In Canada, the song peaked at number one on The Record's singles chart and at number eleven on the RPM 100 Hit Tracks chart. Outside North America, the cover topped Australia's ARIA Singles Chart for a week and reached the top five in Iceland, Ireland, Norway, New Zealand, Sweden and Switzerland. In the United Kingdom, "Cats in the Cradle" charted at number seven on the UK Singles Chart.

=== Charts ===
==== Weekly charts ====
Chart (1993)	Peak position
Australia (ARIA)	1
Austria (Ö3 Austria Top 40)	7
Belgium (Ultratop 50 Flanders)	20
Canada Retail Singles (The Record)	1
Canada Top Singles (RPM)	11
Canada Adult Contemporary (RPM)	21
Europe (Eurochart Hot 100)	16
Europe (European Hit Radio)	13
France (SNEP)	28
Germany (GfK)	10
Iceland (Íslenski Listinn Topp 40)	2
Ireland (IRMA)	3
Israel (Israeli Singles Chart)	9
Netherlands (Dutch Top 40)	14
Netherlands (Single Top 100)	12
New Zealand (Recorded Music NZ)	4
Norway (VG-lista)	2
Portugal (AFP)	8
Sweden (Sverigetopplistan)	4
Switzerland (Schweizer Hitparade)	5
UK Singles (Official Charts)	7
UK Airplay (Music Week)	4
US Billboard Hot 100	6
US Mainstream Rock Airplay (Billboard)	3
US Pop Airplay (Billboard)	11
US Cash Box Top 100	9

==== Year-end charts ====
Chart (1993)	Position
Australia (ARIA)	8
Canada Top Singles (RPM)	79
Europe (Eurochart Hot 100)	40
Germany (Media Control)	25
Iceland (Íslenski Listinn Topp 40)	32
Netherlands (Dutch Top 40)	65
Netherlands (Single Top 100)	70
New Zealand (RIANZ)	24
Sweden (Topplistan)	30
Switzerland (Schweizer Hitparade)	26
UK Singles (OCC)	74
US Billboard Hot 100	61
US Album Rock Tracks (Billboard)	39
US Cash Box Top 100	47

==== Decade-end charts ====
Chart (1990–1999)	Position
Canada (Nielsen SoundScan)	45

=== Certifications ===
Region	Certification	Certified units/sales
Australia (ARIA)	Platinum	70,000^{^}
Denmark (IFPI Danmark)	Gold	45,000^{‡}
New Zealand (RMNZ)	Gold	15,000^{‡}
United Kingdom (BPI)	Silver	200,000^{‡}
United States (RIAA)	Gold	500,000^{^}
^{^} Shipments figures based on certification alone.^{‡} Sales+streaming figures based on certification alone.

=== Release history ===
Region	Date	Format(s)	Label(s)	Ref.
United States	1993	7-inch vinyl; cassette	Mercury; Stardog	
Australia	February 21, 1993	CD; cassette	Mercury; Stardog	
United Kingdom	March 1, 1993	7-inch vinyl; 12-inch vinyl; CD; cassette	Mercury	

== Johnny Cash version ==
Johnny Cash released a cover of the song as part of his 1990 album Boom Chicka Boom. It was also released as a single.

== In popular culture ==
Rapper Darryl "DMC" McDaniels was inspired to rewrite "Cat's in the Cradle" and perform it as "Just Like Me," featuring Sarah McLachlan. The song was released from DMC's album Checks Thugs and Rock n Roll in March 2006; it tells the story of his birth and adoption.

The song was used in a 1993 anti-terrorism advert in Northern Ireland that plays on the song's theme of a father who neglects his son in order to show a terrorist neglecting his family and his son turning out to be like his father and suffering the consequences by going down the same life path. The video ends with the slogan "Don't Suffer It, Change It" and the number of the confidential telephone line that was in operation at the time to report terrorist activity in Northern Ireland.

In a 1991 episode of The Simpsons, Homer worries that he doesn't know anything about his son Bart and calls the hotline for the National Fatherhood Institute. He's put on hold and, to Homer's sorrow, the hold music is "Cat's in the Cradle." In the 2007 film Shrek the Third, Donkey sings the chorus after learning that Shrek is going to become a father.

A lyric of the song was mentioned by the father to his son in the Christmas episode of The Middle season 5. The song was also referenced in the animated series BoJack Horseman, when the character Mr. Peanutbutter forces his accountant to stop spending time with his son to come back to work for him. The accountant's son says his father was supposed to play catch with him, and show him the song, to which the accountant says "Don't listen to it now [...] The lyrics are too relevant!"

In The Office, in an attempt to make him leave work, Dwight tricks Jim into allowing him to play the song, knowing the lyrics would worsen his guilt about being at work instead of at home with Pam and their newborn child.
