= John Wallace (musician) =

American singer

"Big" John Wallace
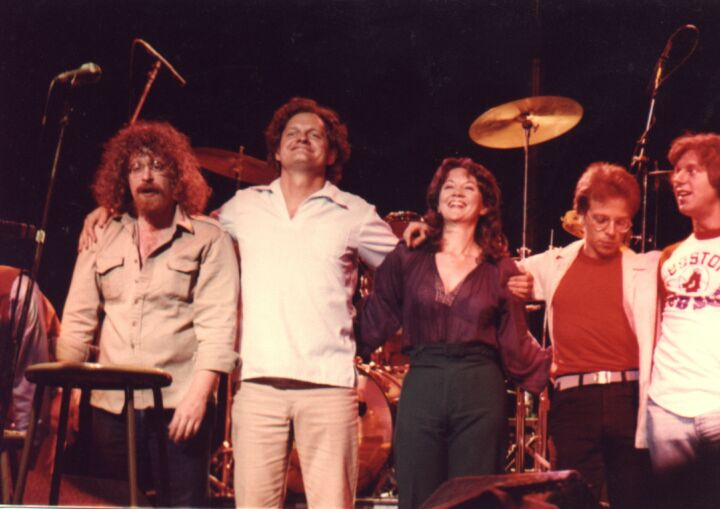
- "Big" John: Standing at far left in the photo (with Harry Chapin, next to him) during a curtain call in the 1970s.

Background information
- Occupations: Singer, musician
- Instruments: Vocals, bass guitar

"Big" John Wallace (born in 1943 in Utica, New York) is an American bassist and singer who became known as a backup-singer and musician for the singer-songwriter Harry Chapin (1942–1981).

== Career ==
=== Musician ===
John Wallace gained membership of Chapin's band by responding to an ad placed in the Village Voice in 1971. Other responders to the ad included cellist Tim Scott and guitarist Ron Palmer.

When Harry Chapin and his brothers went on tour in 1971, Harry asked Wallace to continue with his backing band as bassist and backup-singer. John Wallace performed with Chapin for ten years, until Harry Chapin's death in 1981. In live concerts, Wallace would sing very high head tones on songs such as "Taxi". However, John displayed a remarkable vocal range, as he also sang the baritone parts in "Mr. Tanner" and "30,000 Pounds of Bananas".

Wallace performed the singing voice of Bluto on the soundtrack and album of Robert Altman's 1980 feature film Popeye, starring Robin Williams. Actor Paul L. Smith acted and spoke as Bluto.

Wallace formed another band, The Strangers, that included himself, Doug Walker, and Howie Fields (from the Harry Chapin band) along with newcomer Malcolm Ruhl. The band played more conventional rock music, as opposed to 'Harry Chapin-type' music, but was short-lived. They performed at Clarence Clemons' Big Man's West on December 18, 1981.

In 1991, the band he spent ten years with was reunited with Steve Chapin at the helm. Steve, Harry's drummer Howard Fields, and John continue to perform as the Steve Chapin Band. They also perform occasionally in a larger ensemble including Tom Chapin and other Chapin family members.
