= Tom Chapin =

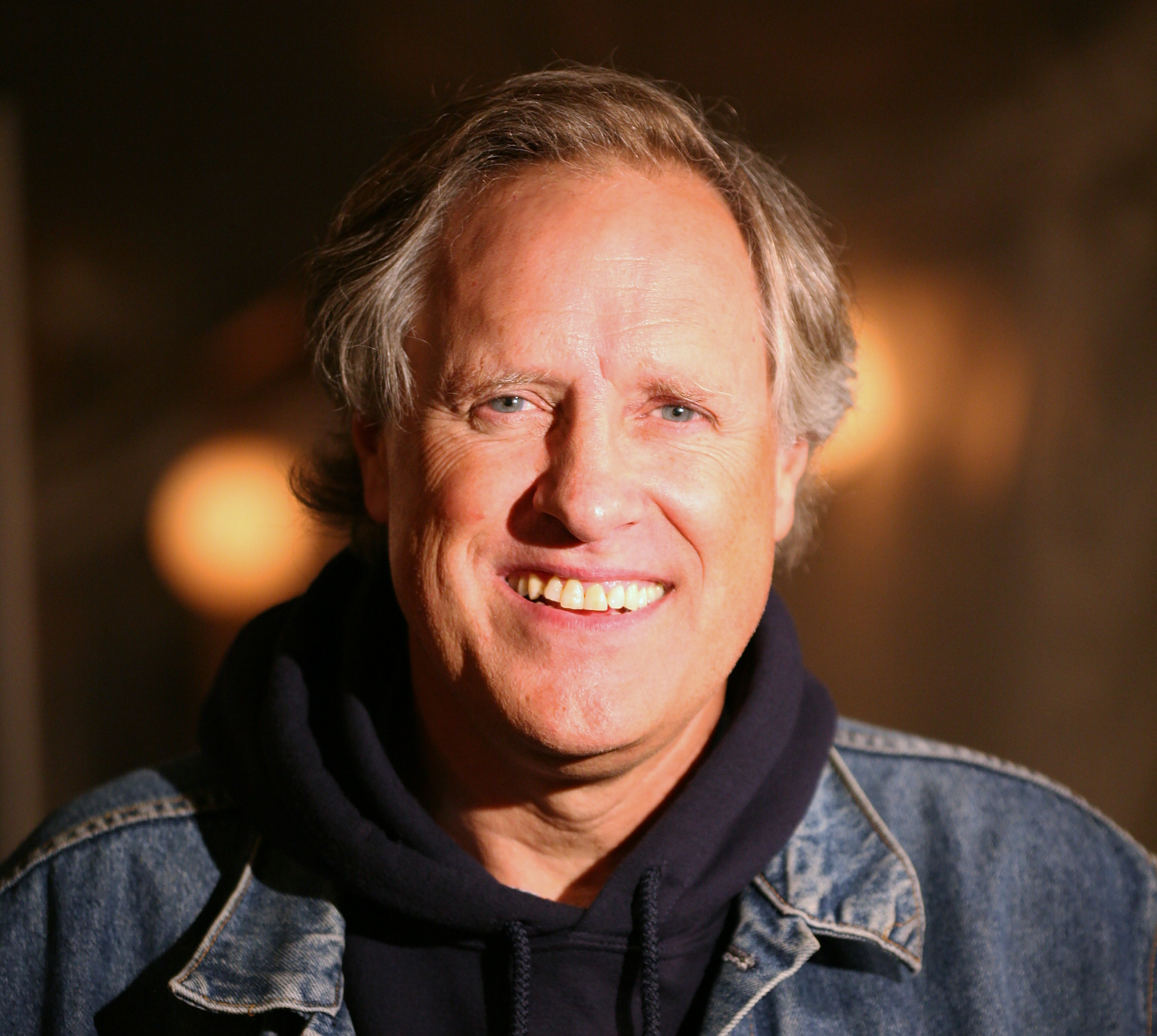
- Tom Chapin

Background information
- Born: March 13, 1945 (age 81); New York City
- Genres: Folk music, children's music
- Occupations: Singer-songwriter, storyteller, actor, children's entertainer
- Instruments: Vocals, guitar, banjo, autoharp, didgeridoo, mandolin, harmonica
- Years active: 1969–present
- Website: www.tomchapin.com

Tom Chapin (born March 13, 1945) is an American singer-songwriter, storyteller, actor and television host. Known for his ABC children's show Make-A-Wish and his children's albums, Chapin is also the younger brother of late folk singer/songwriter and humanitarian Harry Chapin. A fixture on the American folk music circuit, he has frequently performed with Pete Seeger, Holly Near, Peter Yarrow, Judy Collins, and David Amram.

Chapin also performs regularly with his brother Steve Chapin, niece Jen Chapin and daughters, Abigail and Lily aka The Chapin Sisters and The Harry Chapin band billed as The Chapin Family. He sits on the board of Why Hunger, his late brother Harry's food justice organization.

== Early life ==
Chapin is the son of jazz drummer Jim Chapin and Elspeth Burke, a textile artist and the daughter of literary critic Kenneth Burke. His paternal grandfather was artist/illustrator James Ormsbee Chapin. Born in Charlotte, North Carolina, Tom Chapin was raised in Brooklyn Heights and Greenwich Village, New York, along with his brothers Steve Chapin and Harry Chapin.

As children, he and his brother Steve sang in the Grace Episcopal Church choir. During the 1960s folk revival, inspired by Pete Seeger and The Weavers, he and his brothers Harry and Steve Chapin started performing together as teenagers, calling themselves The Chapin Brothers. They performed at The Bitter End and other Greenwich Village folk clubs. In 1965, they appeared on The Merv Griffin Show with their dad on drums. The following year they released their album "Chapin Music!"

Chapin attended Brooklyn Technical High School and State University of New York at Plattsburgh, where he had a college basketball career before he graduated in 1966. A member of the school's 1,000 Point Club, he is also an inductee of the Plattsburgh State Athletic Hall of Fame.

== Solo career ==
In 1969, Chapin joined the crew of the shark documentary Blue Water, White Death. He appears in the flm and served as the film's soundman and resident folk singer. The film is thought to have inspired Jaws. After seeing the film, Steven Spielberg approached the film's husband and wife underwater photographers, Valerie and Ron Taylor, to work with him on Jaws. Tom's folk singing presence in the film is said to have inspired Wes Anderson's The Life Aquatic with Steve Zissou.

From 1971 to 1976, Chapin hosted ABC's Peabody Award and Emmy-winning children's TV series Make a Wish.

In 1976, he released his first solo album Life Is Like That, on Fantasy Records. That same year, he appeared with his brothers Harry Chapin and Steve Chapin on Don Kirchner's Rock Concert. In 1981, he served as the musical director of his brother Harry's off-Broadway show Cotton Patch Gospel. In 1983, he appeared in the Broadway production of the Tony-nominated Pump Boys and Dinettes, replacing Louden Wainwright III in the role of "Jim".

In 1984, Tom and Steve Chapin co-produced Cabbage Patch Dreams, a platinum-selling album from the Cabbage Patch Kids released on the Parker Brothers record label at the height of the Cabbage Patch Kids craze. Chapin's niece Jen Chapin and his stepdaughter Jessica Craven appear on the album.

In 1988, Tom Chapin has released his first children's album, Family Tree (A&M). The album featured Judy Collins and the song This Pretty Planet, which he co-wrote with John Forster. The song, which is often performed by children's choirs and was played to wake up the astronauts on the Space Shuttle Discovery 9, also inspired a 2020 children's picture book of the same name This Pretty Planet (Simon & Schuster).

Chapin has released 13 children's music albums, earning three Grammy wins for Mamma Don't Allow(2001), There was an Old Lady Who Swallowed A Fly (2002), and The Train They Call The City of New Orleans (2004). He has been nominated eight times.

He has also released numerous albums for an adult audience, including Tom Chapin 70, and appeared on many of his brother Harry's albums, including "Greatest Stories Live" and "Verities and Balderdash."

Tom regularly performs with other members of his musical family, including brother Steve Chapin, his niece Jen Chapin, and his daughters The Chapin Sisters, billed as The Chapin Family, playing tribute to his brother Harry and supporting Why Hunger.

Simon & Schuster has released three books based on his lyrics, including The Library Book, and The Backward Birthday Party. Chapin has branched in to the storytelling festival circuit and in 2007 was a Featured New Voices Teller at the National Storytelling Festival in Jonesborough, Tennessee.

In 2020, during the Covid lockdown, while sequestered together in Chapin's Hudson Valley home, Tom and his daughters Abigail and Lily Chapin performed daily livestreamed concerts they dubbed Mornings With Papa Tom and The Chapin Sisters for families with young children, hoping to provide some human warmth. Abigail and Lily's 4-year old daughters would usually join them to sing songs from Tom's children's albums and classic folk songs. The 200 shows were streamed on YouTube, Facebook and Instagram.

== Activism and personal life ==
Chapin is an advocate for arts education. In April 2008, Chapin appeared at the New York State United Teachers' Convention, where he sang his song '"Not on the Test," which is critical of standardized testing and supports of the importance of arts and music education in the age of No Child Left Behind. He also performed "Not on the Test" at The California Kindergarten Teachers Association. The song, a lullaby for students stressed about testing, debuted on NPR's Morning Edition in January 2007.

The song appeared on Broadsides: A Miscellany of Musical Opinions, (2010) a collection of socially conscious songs written for Morning Edition by Chapin and his longtime collaborator, satirist and songwriter John Forster.

Chapin sits on the board of directors for WhyHunger, the food justice nonprofit, co-founded by his brother Harry Chapin and Bill Ayres, dedicated to ending world hunger. Founded in 1975, the organization grew out of Harry Chapin's work with President Jimmy Carter, when he served as chair of the President's Commission on World Hunger.

A longtime supporter of Hudson River Sloop Clearwater and the environmental work of Pete Seeger and his wife Toshi Seeger, Tom has performed many times at their Clearwater Festival.

He is married to Bonnie Chapin (née Broecker), former wife of film director Wes Craven and sister of Wallace Smith Broecker. His daughters, Abigail and Lily Chapin, and stepdaughter Jessica Craven, are all musicians as well; Abigail and Lily perform as The Chapin Sisters. His stepson Jonathan Craven is a filmmaker.

== Awards ==
- 2001 Grammy Award: Best Spoken Word Album For Children, Mama Don't Allow
- 2002 Grammy Award: Best Spoken Word Album For Children, There Was an Old Lady Who Swallowed a Fly
- 2004 Grammy Award: Best Spoken Word Album For Children, The Train They Call the City of New Orleans

== Discography ==
=== Albums ===
- Life Is Like That (1976, Sundance Music)
- In The City of Mercy (1982, Sundance Music)
- Let Me Back into Your Life (1986, Flying Fish Records)
- Family Tree (1988, A&M)
- Moonboat (1989, Sony)
- Mother Earth (1990, A&M)
- Billy the Squid (1992, Sony)
- So Nice to Come Home (1994, Sundance Music)
- Zag Zig (1994, Sony)
- Around the World and Back Again (1996, Sony Wonder)
- This Pretty Planet (1996, Sony)
- Join The Jubilee (1996, Gadfly)
- Doing Our Job with John McCutcheon (1997, Rounder Select)
- In My Hometown (1998, Sony)
- Common Ground (2001, Gadfly)
- Great Big Fun for the Very Little One (2001, Music Little People)
- Making Good Noise (2003, Gadfly)
- Bring Back the Joy!, compilation (2004, Organic Arts Ltd)
- Some Assembly Required (2005, Razor & Tie)
- The Turning Of The Tide (2006, CDBY)
- So Nice To Come Home (2008, Sundance Music)
- Let The Bad Times Roll (2009, CDBY)
- Broadsides with John Forster (2010, CDBY)
- Give Peas a Chance (2011, Sundance Music)
- The Incredible Flexible You (2013, Sundance Music)
- 70 (2015, Sundance Music)
- Threads (2017, Sundance Music)
- At the Turning Point (2019, Sundance Music)
- Hold Our Ground (2022, Sundance Music)
- Songs of Hope (2025, Sundance Music)

=== Singles ===
==== Family Tree (1988) ====
- "The Nick of Time"
- "Shovelling"
- "The Big Rock Candy Mountain"
- "Someone's Gonna Use It"
- "Family Tree"
- "This Pretty Planet"
- "Uh-Oh, Accident"
- "Together Tomorrow"

==== Moonboat (1989) ====
- "Library Song"
- "The Trail Ride"
- "Moonboat"
- "Don't Play With Bruno"
- "Neat Mess"
- "Mother's Day"
- "State Laughs"
- "You'll Come Shining Through"
- "Alphabet Soup"
- "Grow In Your Own Sweet Way"
- "Sing a Whale Song"
- "Happy Birthday"
- "Catches"
- "Princess Di's Distress"

==== Mother Earth (1990) ====
- "A Song of One"
- "Two Kinds of Seagulls"
- "The Wheel of the Water"
- "Good Garbage"
- "Mother Earth's Routine"
- "Cousins"

==== Billy the Squid (1992) ====
- "Great Big Words"
- "All of My Friends"
- "You'll Be Sorry"
- "Camelling"
- "Happy Earth Day"
- "Billy the Squid"

==== Zag Zig (1994) ====
- "The Backwards Birthday Party"
- "Mikey Won't"
- "R-E-C-Y-C-L-E"
- "Hi, Hi, I Love Ya"
- "Loose Tooth"
- "Clean Machine"
- "Johnny Glockenspiel"

==== Around the World and Back Again (1996) ====
- "What Is a Didgeridoo?"
- "Song of the Earth"

== Filmography ==
=== Film ===
Year	Film	Role
1971	Blue Water, White Death	Self
2004	The Manchurian Candidate	Governor Edward Nelson
2006	The Kingston Trio: 50 Years of Having Fun	Self
2012	Greenwich Village: Music That Defined a Generation	Self
2020	Harry Chapin: When In Doubt, Do Something	Self
2023	Sharksploitation	Self

=== Television ===
Year	Title	Role	Notes
1971-76	Make a Wish	Himself - Host	
1973	Curiosity Shop	Himself	
1976	The Mike Douglas Show	Himself	
1976	Don Kirschner's Rock Concert	Himself	
1986	National Geographic Explorer	Himself - Host	
1987	A Tribute to Harry Chapin	Himself	
2008	Lomax, the Hound of Music	Tom the Postman	
