= Taxi (Harry Chapin song) =

Song by Harry Chapin

Single by Harry Chapin

from the album Heads & Tales
- B-side: "Empty"
- Released: March 1972
- Recorded: 1972
- Genre: Folk rock
- Length: 6:44
- Label: Elektra
- Songwriter: Harry Chapin
- Producer: Jac Holzman

Harry Chapin singles chronology
"Taxi" (1972)	"Could You Put Your Light On, Please" (1972)

"Taxi" is a song written by Harry Chapin, released as a single in early 1972 to coincide with the release of his album Heads & Tales. It is an autobiographical ballad using first-person narrative to tell the story of a taxicab driver meeting an old flame from his youth when he picks her up in his cab.

Chapin debuted the song on NBC's The Tonight Show Starring Johnny Carson, which prompted calls and telegrams from viewers requesting that Chapin return to the show. It was the first time in the show's history that host Johnny Carson brought a performer back the very next night for an encore performance. "Taxi" helped to establish Chapin's musical style and emerged as his early signature song, with Chapin often associated with taxi-related imagery. Jim Connors, music director and disc jockey at Boston AM radio station WMEX, is credited with discovering Chapin. The single charted on both Boston stations WMEX and WRKO in late February, reached number one on both stations in April and ranked 4 for the year on both stations. The single's early Boston success helped "Taxi" to hit big on Billboard's Hot 100, where in June 1972 it reached no. 24 during a then-lengthy 16-week chart run. Billboard ranked it 85 in its year-end singles list. In Canada the single reached no. 5.

== Content ==
The narrator Harry is a cab driver in San Francisco whose last passenger on a rainy night is a woman in an expensive gown who asks to be taken to her home in an affluent section of town. Harry finds her familiar, but she seems not to recognize him until after she glances at his taxi license. She then greets him by name, and he replies in kind: she is Sue, an old flame from Harry's youth. They had gone their separate ways to follow their respective dreams: Sue wanted to be an actress, and Harry wanted to learn to fly (hinting at Chapin's real-life experience at the United States Air Force Academy).

When the taxi arrives at Sue's home, she vaguely offers to get together with him sometime, but Harry knows this will not happen. Sue gives him a $20 bill for a $2.50 fare and tells him to keep the change. (The fare would be equivalent to $19 in 2025.)

Harry realizes they both got what they asked for: Sue is "acting" happy in a loveless marriage and sterile affluence, while Harry is "flying" a taxi, taking tips, and "getting stoned." A censored radio version of the single replaced "stoned" with "stalled".

Chapin said, "there's not a single line that tells how the guy or the girl felt. It's a very cinematic technique. But it's also a very uneconomical technique. That's why my songs are so long. I literally put you in that cab and let you experience. It's a more involving form of music than sitting and hearing somebody sing 'I'm lonely'."

Record World called it "spell-binding," saying that Chapin "sets up, develops and resolves a situation in 6:40. A very short 6:40." Billboard called it "a strong piece of folk ballad material while lengthy, should garner hefty top 40 and FM play with sales and chart action to follow."

== Charts ==
=== Weekly charts ===
Chart (1972)	Peak position
Australia (Kent Music Report)	40
Australia (Go-Set)	28
Canada RPM Top Singles	5
New Zealand (Listener)	19
U.S. Billboard Hot 100	24
U.S. Cash Box Top 100	20

=== Year-end charts ===
Chart (1972)	Rank
Canada	37
US Billboard Hot 100	85

== "Sequel" ==
"Sequel"

Single by Harry Chapin

from the album Sequel
- B-side: "I Finally Found It Sandy"
- Released: 1980
- Recorded: 1980
- Genre: Pop rock; Folk rock
- Length: 6:36
- Label: Boardwalk
- Songwriter: Harry Chapin
- Producers: Ron Albert, Howard Albert

Harry Chapin singles chronology
"Flowers Are Red" (1978)	"Sequel" (1980)	"Remember When the Music" (1980)

Professional ratings
Review scores
Source	Rating
Billboard	(unrated)

In 1980, after nearly a decade of fans questioning what he imagined happening to Harry and Sue later in their lives, Chapin wrote and composed "Sequel", which he released on the album of the same name. Written in the same style as "Taxi", it continues the story of Harry and Sue with them meeting again ten years later. Released as a single, "Sequel" peaked one position higher, but lasted two weeks fewer, on the Hot 100 than "Taxi". It also remains Chapin's last appearance on the Hot 100 chart, though his last single "Story of a Life" would reach No. 5 on the Bubbling Under Hot 100. Chapin joked that, if he wrote a third act to the song, it would be called "Hearse", so he could kill off the characters. Chapin died seven months after "Sequel" peaked.

In the song, Harry, now a successful musician, returns to San Francisco to play a concert, and has "eight hours to kill before the show," and thinks of his old lover. He decides to visit the upper-crust address of "16 Parkside Lane" where he last saw Sue a decade before.

After considering options of "a limousine, or at least a fancy car," to impress Sue, he takes a taxi to the reunion, this time sitting in the back as the paying customer. The taxi turns into the driveway "past the gate and the fine-trimmed lawn." Harry is informed by a butler answering the door that Sue no longer lives there. The butler gives Harry a forwarding address. Harry tells his cabbie, "I got one more fare for you." The address proves to be that of a modest brownstone urban apartment. At the door:

And she said, "How are you, Harry?"
"Haven't we played this scene before?"
I said, "It's so good to see you, Sue"
"Had to play it out just once more...
"Play it out just once more."

Far from an affluent suburban trophy wife, Sue is now a working-class woman — but is happy with her life. No longer the cold and cloistered socialite, she is now warmer and wiser. She tells Harry of hearing him on the radio; he shrugs off the hype of stardom and invites her to see his show that night. She politely declines, saying only, "I work at night." Harry provides few other details on the reunion, urging listeners not to dig deeper: "If I answered at all, I'd lie". This time, it is Harry who offers money as they part, which she declines to take.

Harry reflects on the circle of their lives. When they were young, she had wanted to be an actress and he a pilot. Ten years ago, she was acting happy in her high-end life while he was flying high, stoned in his taxi. Today he "act[s] as I'm facing the footlights, and now she's flying with both feet on the ground."

The song ends with:

So I guess it's the sequel to our story
From the journey between heaven and hell
With half the time, thinking of what might have been
And half thinkin' just as well.
I guess only time will tell.

=== Charts ===
Chart (1980–1981)	Peak position
U.S. Billboard Hot 100	23
U.S. Adult Contemporary (Billboard)	37
U.S. Cash Box Top 100	34

== Origins ==
According to the liner notes in The Essentials: Harry Chapin, Chapin was inspired to write the song when he happened upon an old lover, as the cabbie in the song does. Chapin was merely on his way to a taxi license examination in New York City, not San Francisco. Chapin also stated that "Taxi" is only "about sixty percent true".

However, according to Chapin's biography Taxi: The Harry Chapin Story, by Peter M. Coan, this song was based on a relationship that Chapin had with a Bennett Junior College student named Clare MacIntyre, the inspiration for Sue. They met when they were both camp counselors at neighboring summer camps during their college years. Clare MacIntryre-Ross died in March 2016.

On the contrary, when asked by John Denver about the song, Chapin stated that he read a newspaper article about his ex-girlfriend who had married a rich man, the same week that his taxi license was supposed to go through. He said that he had a dream that he would be driving the cab in a big city and he would stop and pick up a lady, and they would look at each other and know that they both sold out their dreams. According to Chapin, he wrote the song then. However, the week the license was supposed to come through, he got a big film job and did not have to drive the cab.

== Covers ==
- William Shatner performed "Taxi" on the daytime TV variety talk show Dinah!.
- During Chapin's later concerts, Big John Wallace would sing the song's first verse in the form of a disco-style as the third alternate ending to "30,000 Pounds of Bananas."
- The song is covered by Mandy Patinkin on his album, Experiment.
- The song is covered by Lee Hazlewood on his album, I'll Be Your Baby Tonight.
