= Steve Chapin =

American singer/songwriter

- Born: Stephen Chapin; December 30, 1946 (age 79); New York City, New York
- Children: 3
- Father: Jim Chapin
- Relatives: Harry Chapin (brother); Tom Chapin (brother); Jen Chapin (niece)

Stephen Chapin (born December 30, 1946) is an American singer-songwriter who was a member of the Harry Chapin's band along with his brothers Harry Chapin and Tom Chapin, and currently fronts the Harry Chapin Band.

== Biography, family, and personal life ==
Stephen Chapin was born on December 30, 1946, in New York City, New York. He was the fourth of four children of percussionist Jim Chapin and Jeanne Elspeth, daughter of the literary critic Kenneth Burke. The first Chapin to come to America was Samuel Chapin, who was the first deacon of Springfield, Massachusetts, in 1636. His other great-grandparents on his mother's side had immigrated in the late 19th century. Chapin's parents divorced in 1950, with his mother retaining custody of their four sons, as Jim spent much of his time on the road as a drummer for Big Band-era acts such as Woody Herman. A few years later, Chapin's mother married Films in Review magazine editor Henry Hart.

Chapin is married to Angela Chapin with whom he has three children. He is the uncle of Abigail and Lily Chapin (of the Chapin Sisters) and Jen Chapin.

== Career ==
Chapin was a choirboy at Grace Episcopal Church in Brooklyn Heights, NY. He later joined his brothers, Harry and Tom, as a member of the Harry Chapin Band where he has held the roles of band leader, musical director, arranger, producer, piano player/multi instrumentalist and singer.

Chapin has also produced many albums including The Chapin Family Christmas Album, and has worked as a teacher, arranger, recording artist, commercial producer, performer, singer, and songwriter. He has appeared on all Harry Chapin albums, and arranged and produced most of them. He performed one of his own songs, "Let Time Go Lightly", on Harry Chapin's Greatest Stories Live album.

== Discography ==
- Chapter 11 Rag (1990)
