= Barbara Moore (composer) =

English composer and arranger (1932–2021)

Background information
- Born: Barbara Birkby; 7 March 1932; Bradford, West Yorkshire, England
- Origin: London, England
- Died: 27 August 2021 (aged 89) Bognor Regis, West Sussex, England
- Genres: Jazz; pop
- Occupations: Composer; arranger; vocalist
- Instrument: Vocals
- Years active: 1959–2001

Barbara Moore (née Birkby; 7 March 1932 – 27 August 2021) was an English composer, arranger and vocalist for film, television and commercials. She was a member of the musical trios the Ladybirds and the Breakaways and a backing vocalist for Dusty Springfield. Moore coordinated the vocals on the New Seekers' chart-topping single "I'd Like to Teach the World to Sing (In Perfect Harmony)", and was the voice behind the theme to the 1960s TV adventure series The Saint. She also rearranged "At the Sign of the Swingin' Cymbal", an instrumental composition that served as the theme tune for Alan Freeman's Pick of the Pops.

== Early life and education ==
Moore was born in Bradford, West Yorkshire, England, on 7 March 1932. She was the only child of musician parents, saxophonist and arranger Arthur Birkby (1904–1998) – who worked with bandleaders Joe Loss (Moore's godfather) and Jack Payne – and Clare Birkby, a singer with the bandleader Geraldo. They later separated. She was raised in London, and attended St Paul's Girls' School, where her music teacher was Nora Day (1891–1985).

== Career ==
=== 1950s ===
Her parents' divorce impeded Moore's ambitions to attend Oxford University. Instead, she travelled to India, at the age of 19, and began performing as a pianist at the Taj Mahal Hotel. However, she could not acclimatise herself to the conditions there, and returned to England, where she joined Dudley Moore's trio, in the late 1950s. She also she sang with the Fraser Hayes Four and the Stargazers.

=== 1960s ===
In the early 1960s Moore was hired to sing the atmospheric vocal opening to a new ITV adventure series, The Saint, wherein her "airy, celestial voice launches the melody". In the mid-1960s, she joined the vocal trio the Ladybirds and provided vocal backup for artists, including Jimi Hendrix, on Top of the Pops. She performed on the radio show Evergreen in 1964 and episodes of the TV series Not Only... But Also (1965), starring Peter Cook and Dudley Moore.

Moore's solo album, A Little Moore Barbara, was released in 1966. In the meantime, she was also featured on Dusty Springfield's TV show. In 1967, she reunited with Dudley Moore and collaborated on his comic film Bedazzled. It was the first of many film assignments in her career. In 1968, she was asked by EMI to manage sessions for vocalist Deena Webster and create an album in six days. This was her first significant excursion into arranging. She performed well and was applauded by the senior musicians at the recording session.

=== 1970s ===
In 1970, Moore went on to arrange and conduct the choir for Elton John's "Border Song". She also founded her own group, the Barbara Moore Singers, performing alongside Glen Campbell (1970), Bobbie Gentry (1970-71) and Mike Yarwood (1972) on BBC television programmes, as well as on the soundtrack of the film The Ruling Class (1971).

The BBC, in April 1970, asked her to update Brian Fahey's "At the Sign of the Swingin' Cymbal" for Alan Freema's Pick of the Pops show. She also arranged the vocals for "I'd Like to Teach the World to Sing", a Coca-Cola commercial song from 1971 that became a hit for the New Seekers in a modified version. After she had composed the theme for Terry Wogan's BBC Radio show, she gained a job at de Wolfe, the library music company. She vocalised on recordings, including the Roger Webb Sound's Vocal Patterns and Moonshade albums, and scored music for commercials across Europe.

In 1972, Moore released her album Vocal Shades and Tones. One of its tracks, "Steam Heat", was later included in an episode of TV drama The Sweeney (1975) for a strip club scene. She also provided the soundtrack to Anthony Stern's experimental film Serendipity in 1972, playing piano alongside musician colleagues Chris Spedding, Ray Warleigh and John Marshall.

=== 1980s ===
Her last album, Bright & Shining, was released in 1981 by the Sylvester Music Company.

== Personal life ==
Moore married the arranger Pete Moore in May 1954. She had met him in Dubai while on a concert pianist job. The couple had a daughter, but they split up shortly after. Moore raised her daughter, Lindsey, as a single parent. Lindsey died in 2006, leaving Moore with a granddaughter, Clare.

After her divorce, Moore was in a relationship with the jazz trombonist Chris Pyne.

== Death ==
Following a prolonged illness, Moore died on 27 August 2021, at the age of 89. She spent her last days at Hotham Park House, Bognor Regis.

== Albums ==
Title	Album details
A Little Moore Barbara	Released: 1967; Label: CBS
Vocal Shades And Tones	Released: 1972; Label: De Wolfe
Bright & Shining	Released: 1981; Label: Sylvester Music Company
Sing Sweet ♡ Barbara Collection 1966-1990	Released: 2001; Label: EM Records
The World Of Barbara Moore - Collection 1966-1981	Released: 2001; Label: EM Records
