= Mona Lisa (Nat King Cole song) =

1949 song by Jay Livingston and Ray Evans

- Original sheet music cover

Single by Nat King Cole
- B-side: "The Greatest Inventor of Them All"
- Published: November 28, 1949 by Famous Music Corp., New York
- Released: June 12, 1950
- Recorded: March 11, 1950
- Studio: Capitol, 5515 Melrose Ave, Hollywood
- Genre: Popular music, Pop standard
- Length: 3:27
- Label: Capitol 1010
- Composer: Jay Livingston
- Lyricist: Ray Evans

Nat King Cole singles chronology
"Nature Boy" (1948)	"Mona Lisa" (1950)	"Unforgettable" (1952)

"Mona Lisa" is a popular song written by Ray Evans and Jay Livingston for the Paramount Pictures film Captain Carey, U.S.A. (1949), in which it was performed by Sergio de Karlo and a recurrent accordion motif. The title and lyrics refer to the renaissance portrait Mona Lisa painted by Leonardo da Vinci. The song won the Academy Award for Best Original Song in 1950.

== Nat King Cole version ==
The song's first musical arrangement was in an orchestration by Nelson Riddle, and the orchestral backing was played by Les Baxter and his Orchestra. The recording was originally the B-side of "The Greatest Inventor Of Them All." In an American Songwriter magazine interview, Jay Livingston recalled that the original advertisements for the record did not even mention "Mona Lisa"; only upon returning home from a publicity junket of numerous radio programs did the song become a hit.

The cover version by Nat King Cole spent five weeks at number one on the Billboard singles chart in 1950. Cole's version of the song was inducted into the Grammy Hall of Fame in 1992. Cole recorded this song again in a stereo version (with Ralph Carmichael and his Orchestra) on March 30, 1961. Cole described this song as one of his favorites among his recordings.

== Cover versions ==
The Billboard sales charts of 1950 also showed significant sales on versions by Dennis Day, Victor Young (vocal by Don Cherry), Art Lund, Ralph Flanagan (vocal by Harry Prime), Charlie Spivak and Harry James (vocal by Dick Williams). Hit versions for Moon Mullican (No. 4, Country) and Jimmy Wakely (No. 10, Country) were also featured in 1950.

In the UK, the song made No. 2 on the sheet music sales chart, with British cover versions by Ronald Chesney (harmonica), Steve Conway and The Stargazers, Frederick Ferrari, Oscar Rabin and his Band (vocal by Dennis Hale), Joe Loss and his Orchestra, Max Bygraves and Ted Heath and his Music (vocal by Dickie Valentine). In 1959, the song's revival led to it once again entering the sheet music charts and peaking at No. 14. This time, contemporary British covers by Paul Rich and Victor Silvester and his Orchestra were released.

A parody version by Yiddish entertainer Mickey Katz and his Orchestra, entitled "Mona Liza", with vocal by Anzio Pizza, was also recorded and released when the song was first popular.

Various artists, including Jim Reeves, Elvis Presley (home recording, December 1958), Shakin' Stevens 1981, Me First and the Gimme Gimmes, the Neville Brothers 1981, and Nat King Cole's daughter Natalie Cole 1992, have released cover versions of this song. Bruddah Iz (Israel Kamakawiwo'ole) also covered the song on the album Alone in IZ World. Bing Crosby recorded the song for his album Songs I Wish I Had Sung the First Time Around in 1956. Harry Connick, Jr. included the song on his 2009 album, Your Songs.

A rockabilly version of "Mona Lisa" (b/w/ "Foolish One") was released by Carl Mann on Phillips International Records (#3539) in March 1959 and reached number 25 on the Billboard Hot 100. Conway Twitty recorded a version of "Mona Lisa" in February 1959, but planned to release it only as an album cut (on an EP and an LP, Conway Twitty Sings by MGM Records). Nevertheless, it peaked at number 5 in the UK Singles Chart in that year and in the top 30 in the United States. Sam Phillips signed Carl Mann to record his version of the song after the Twitty version began getting radio play in early 1959. This was the most successful single in Mann's career. The melody is slightly different, and the lyrics are also mostly the same as in the original version by Nat King Cole, though a few more phrases are added in that elaborate more on the girl he likes. Brian Setzer covered the Mann version in his 2005 Rockabilly Riot Vol. 1: A Tribute to Sun Records.

Phil Ochs, known for his protest songs in the 1960s, performed the song in 1970 at his infamous Carnegie Hall concert. The cover appears on the 1974 concert album Gunfight at Carnegie Hall.

Willie Nelson released a version of "Mona Lisa" as the first track of his 1981 album Somewhere Over the Rainbow, peaking at No. 11 on the US Country Chart.

== Legacy ==
- Partygoers sing "Mona Lisa" in the background of one scene in Alfred Hitchcock's Rear Window (1954).
- In 1986, the song was used as the theme to the British film Mona Lisa.
- The song was used in the wedding scene of the NBC mini-series, Witness to the Mob, in 1998.
- The song was also used prominently in The Freshman, via both Cole's recording and a performance during the film by Bert Parks.
- A snippet of the song's lyric was used in the Hong Kong heroic bloodshed movie, Hard Boiled in 1992. It is used by an undercover cop to send an encoded message, but the message itself is never shown in the movie.
- Bob's Burgers used a parody of the song in the outro to season 10, episode 1.
- The song is featured in the climax of the 2022 film Glass Onion: A Knives Out Mystery.
- In the movie, The Godfather (1972), the song can be heard in the background as Michael talks to Fredo in Las Vegas prior to their meeting with Moe Greene.

== Chart performance ==
=== Moon Mullican ===
Chart (1950)	Peak position
US Hot Country Songs (Billboard)	4

=== Jimmy Wakely ===
Chart (1950)	Peak position
US Hot Country Songs (Billboard)	10

=== Conway Twitty ===
Chart (1959)	Peak position
Australian Singles Chart	1
Norwegian Singles Chart	2
Belgian Singles Chart	3
UK Singles Chart	5
US Billboard Hot 100	29

=== Willie Nelson ===
Chart (1981)	Peak position
US Hot Country Songs (Billboard)	11

== See also ==
- List of Billboard number-one singles of 1950
- List of number-one rhythm and blues hits (United States)
