= Mike Redway =

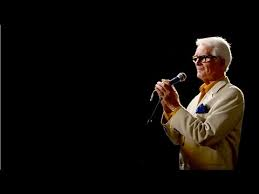
- Mike Redway Sings "Rock'n'Roll You're Beautiful" from his album "The Next Time"

Background information
- Born: Michael Richard Reddyhoff; December 1939 (age 86)
- Origin: Hunslet, Leeds, Yorkshire, England
- Genres: Pop; comedy
- Occupations: Singer, songwriter, record producer, musician
- Years active: 1957–present
- Label: Embassy

Mike Redway (born December 1939 in Hunslet) is the stage name for Michael Richard Reddyhoff an English singer, songwriter and record producer. He began his career in the late 1950s as a backing vocalist for Embassy Records.

== Life and career ==
Redway was the son of a pub landlord and a baker. He was educated at All Saints School and began singing at a young age – touring the local working men's clubs alongside his brother. In 1959, he was signed onto Embassy Records as a backing vocalist.

Having worked as a backing vocalist, Mike recorded his first single for Embassy in 1962 alongside Ray Pilgrim, and recorded a further 28 singles on the Embassy label in this period. During the sixties he was asked to understudy Frank Sinatra on a Tony Hatch produced record, which was never released commercially. In 1967 Mike was approached by Burt Bacharach to perform the vocal on the song Have No Fear, James Bond is Here - which was used for the credit-roll of the 1967 spoof film Casino Royale. He also achieved No. 1 chart success in Germany with the single Du Kannst Nicht Immer Siebszehn ("You can't always be seventeen") which he co-wrote with Ralph Siegel, and which was sung by Chris Roberts. He also produced Terry Wogan's hit The Floral Dance, which reached No. 21 in April 1978.

Mike has also competed to represent the United Kingdom at the Eurovision Song Contest on two occasions. In 1975 he co-penned the song The House Runs On Sunshine with Brian Bennett for The Shadows. At the Song For Europe final held on 15 February the song finished third. Ten years later he made another attempt to represent the UK with his own entry So Do I with Fiona Kennedy, however the song finished joint last in the national final.

Mike also composed the music to the children's television show Charlie Chalk, which was produced by Woodland Animation and featured the voice of Michael Williams. The theme music to the show, which was penned by Redway was performed by his close friend Ken Barrie, whom he had met at Embassy in the early sixties.

In 1973 Mike formed his own production company Redrock Music Ltd, known for producing radio advertisements and jingles.

In 1981, he released the single, "Rock and Roll You're Beautiful" / "Guiding Star" which was released on Go Ahead Records GA 0112. He also released "Morris Minor" / "Happy Birthday to You" on Button Records BTN 101 and " Wedding Bells" / "I'm Yours" on Crystal CR 7032 in the same year.

In 2016 he wrote the music for the musical comedy Seriously Dead. For its second year of touring the show was renamed Right Place Wrong Time

In 2019 Mike was the driving force behind the launch of a website offering ready- made jingles to the advertising, TV and Media markets called Redrock Production Music. He also wrote all the original songs used in Paul Dunn's 2019 touring adaptation of Catherine Cookson's The Cinder Path, produced by Leah Bell.

Mike was also a regular contributor to many recording sessions with the BBC Radio Orchestra and music director Neil Richardson.

== Discography ==
=== Albums ===
- Jesus Christ Superstar – The Highlights (1972)
- Those Beautiful Ballad Years (1989)
- Specifics 19 – Tiny Tots (1993)
- Charlie Chalk – Music from the TV Series (1994)
- These Are A Few of My Favourite Hymns (1995)
- The Next Time (2009)
- Moonlight and Love Songs (2010)
- The Embassy Years Vol.1 (2011)
- The Embassy Years Vol.2 (2011)
- Old Sweet Songs (2013)

== Film, Radio and TV work ==
=== Music ===
- Casino Royale – performer "Have No Fear, James Bond is Here" (1967)
- The Prime of Miss Jean Brodie – performer "Somebody's Crying" (1969)
- Charlie Chalk – series composer (1987)
- "Those Beautiful Ballad Years" - BBC Radio 2 series hosted by Mike 1988–1992

=== Acting ===
- Don't Ask Us – We're New Here – series regular (1969)
- Spitting Image – voice 1 episode (1985)
