= Halfway to Heaven =

Halfway to Heaven may refer to:

== Music ==
- Halfway to Heaven (album), by Brantley Gilbert, 2010
- Halfway to Heaven: The Best of The Blow Monkeys & Dr Robert, a 2013 album by The Blow Monkeys
- "Halfway to Heaven" (Harry Chapin song), 1974
- "Halfway to Heaven" (Europe song), 1992
- "Halfway to Heaven", a 1992 song by Celine Dion from Celine Dion
- "Halfway to Heaven", a 1959 song by Conway Twitty from Saturday Night with Conway Twitty

== Other uses ==
- Half Way to Heaven (1929 film), a film starring Buddy Rogers and Jean Arthur
- Half Way to Heaven (1931 film), a Swedish drama film
- Halfway to Heaven (horse), a Thoroughbred racehorse
