= Embassy Records =

- Parent company: Woolworths Group (1954–1965); CBS Records (1973–1980)
- Founded: 1954
- Founder: David Morris Levy; Jacques Levy
- Defunct: 1980
- Status: Inactive
- Distributors: Oriole Music; CBS Records
- Genre: Various
- Country of origin: UK
- Location: London, England

Embassy Records was a UK budget record label that produced cover versions of current hit songs, which were sold exclusively in Woolworths shops at a lower price than the original recordings. The original label was active between 1954 and 1965, after which it disappeared when its parent company, Oriole, was taken over by CBS Records.

Later, between 1973 and 1980, CBS Records revived the Embassy imprint to release budget versions of albums in the UK and Europe by artists who were signed to its parent company, Columbia Records.

== History 1954–1965 ==
Embassy Records was the result of a contractual arrangement between Oriole Records and Woolworths, with Embassy's product being sold exclusively through the latter's stores. Between November 1954 and January 1965, Embassy released around 1,200 songs recorded by about 150 different artists and these releases were sold for half the price of a major label release of the era. The label's releases mostly consisted of double A-side singles that were cover versions of then-current or predicted UK Top 20 hits, and it was not unusual for different artists or contrasting pop styles to appear on either side of a record. Embassy can therefore be seen as a UK equivalent of U.S. labels such as Hit and (in its early days) Bell Records.

The label's product was recorded at the Embassy Recording Studios in New Bond Street, Mayfair, and manufactured by Oriole, who also licensed the material to many foreign outlets. The tight Embassy recording schedule required four different songs to be recorded in one three-hour session. Included in this standard three-hour session was the initial studio set-up time, before any actual songs were recorded, and a mandatory musicians' coffee break. This meant that on average there was a little over 30 minutes allowed for the recording of an individual song, which, in turn, meant that the artists who did the actual singing had to be first-rate professional singers who could enter a studio and record a song in very few takes. As a result, Embassy artists tended to be very experienced big band or session singers, who would also regularly broadcast live on BBC radio. Sometimes these musicians used their professional name when recording for Embassy, but very often they used pseudonyms. The recording sessions usually took place on a Thursday, so that the cover version discs could be rushed out into the stores by the following Monday to compete with the real thing.

As well as releasing covers of current hit singles, Embassy Records also produced EPs of trad jazz, children's songs, light classical music, and songs from musicals.

In late 1964, Embassy's parent label, Oriole, was taken over by CBS Records (Columbia Records in America). Following this purchase, the label was discontinued, with the final Embassy release of the 1960s being "Keep Searchin' (We'll Follow the Sun)" by Paul Rich and the Beatmen (b/w "The Special Years" by Burt Shane) in January 1965. By this time, the concept of budget cover version releases of current hit songs had been imitated by other labels such as Cannon, Crossbow, Top Six, and Top Pops. CBS subsidiary Hallmark/Pickwick launched the Top of the Pops series of albums a few years after the demise of Embassy, but unlike Embassy's releases, no artists were ever identified on the records.

=== The artists ===
The artist whose name appears on the greatest number of Embassy recordings is Paul Rich, a singer with the Lou Preager Orchestra, who recorded for Embassy between 1957 and 1965. However, the artist who actually recorded the most songs for Embassy was Ray Pilgrim. Between 1960 and 1965 he recorded almost 150 songs for the Embassy label using the pseudonyms Bobby Stevens, the Typhoons, the Jaybirds, and the Starlings.

Mike Redway, who had been a singer with the Oscar Rabin Band, recorded for Embassy under the pseudonym Redd Wayne, in addition to appearing on many of the Typhoons, Jaybirds and Starlings recordings for the label between 1962 and 1965. Redway later sang the vocal version of the "Casino Royale Theme" over the closing credits of the 1967 Casino Royale film. Ken Barrie, who later became the voice of Postman Pat, recorded for Embassy under the name of Les Carle.

The female singers who made the most recordings for the label were Jean Campbell, Joan Baxter, Maureen Evans and Barbara Kay, with all but the latter recording for Embassy under their own names. Maureen Evans went on to have a hit for Oriole with "Like I Do" and Barbara Kay was one of the members of the Carefrees, who released the novelty record "We Love You Beatles" in 1964. Barbara Kay, who was yet another singer who had previously been with the Oscar Rabin Band, was usually credited as Kay Barry on Embassy releases.

Instrumental recordings would feature whatever session musicians were booked for that day, so the names used for the label, such as Bud Ashton, the Beatmen and the Happy Knights, did not imply any particular participants. Similarly, the group names such as the Typhoons, the Jaybirds, and the Starlings did not imply any consistent membership and were generally made up of any musicians who were available on that particular day. Additionally, backing vocals on many Embassy releases were provided by the Mike Sammes Singers but usually went uncredited.

== History 1973–1980 ==
CBS Records revived the Embassy imprint in 1973, with the slogan "All the Best from Embassy", to release budget albums of out of print, unissued, or foreign material in the UK and Europe, which had originally been released by Columbia Records (or its subsidiaries). Initially, 39 albums were released by the label in October, 1973, including titles by Barbra Streisand, Aretha Franklin, Tony Bennett, Sly & the Family Stone, Fleetwood Mac, and Blood, Sweat & Tears, among others. Many other Columbia artists had albums reissued on Embassy during the 1970s, including Johnny Mathis, the Byrds, Andy Williams, Johnny Cash, Tammy Wynette, and Spirit. CBS Records once again discontinued the Embassy imprint and ceased issuing albums in the UK and Europe in 1980. However, there are known to be some Mexican Embassy releases from much later on in the 1980s.

== Other uses of name ==
- Embassy Records, a short-lived label that distributed recordings for the Warriors Dance record label during the 1990s
- Embassy Records, an independent record label, based in New Orleans
- Embassy Productions, a heavy metal record label from the 1990s
- Avco Embassy, a record label that released records by the Chambers Brothers, the Stylistics and Henry Mancini (amongst others) in the 1960s and 1970s
- Embassy 9 Records, a Canadian electronic independent record label, based out of Chilliwack, BC

== See also ==
- Conqueror Records, Sears store brand record label
- Oriole Records (U.S.), McCrory's store brand record label
- List of record labels
