= Go Man Go (radio show) =

British radio programme

- Country of origin: United Kingdom
- Language: English
- Home station: BBC Light Programme
- Starring: David Ede and the Rabin Band
- Directed by: David Ede
- Produced by: John Hooper; Terry Henebery; Don George
- Original release: 29 December 1958 – March 1964
- No. of episodes: 256

Go Man Go (occasionally Go Man, Go or Go, Man, Go) featuring David Ede and the Rabin Band was one of British radio's flagship lunchtime pop music shows during the late 1950s and early '60s. The show ran on the BBC Light Programme radio channel in Britain from December 1958 to the end of March 1964 with a total of 256 consecutive weekly episodes (apart from 18 weeks when the show was pre-empted by other events).

== Background and evolution ==
At the time of the radio show the British Broadcasting Corporation (BBC) had three big-band music shows on weekday lunchtimes: Make Way for Music featuring the BBC Northern Dance Orchestra (originally conducted by Alyn Ainsworth and later by Bernard Herrmann); Parade of the Pops featuring Bob Miller and the Millermen; and Go Man Go featuring David Ede and the Rabin Band. Make Way for Music was broadcast from the Playhouse Theatre in Manchester without a studio audience and the latter two were usually broadcast live in front of an invited audience from the BBC studio at the Paris Cinema in London's Lower Regent Street which had retained its original name since 1939 when it opened as a venue for French language films.

The Rabin Band evolved from a small group set up in 1922 by Latvian immigrant violinist Oscar Rabin called the Romany Five into a highly popular and successful British dance band in the 1930s and 1940s known as the Oscar Rabin Orchestra in which Oscar played bass saxophone. Oscar was more interested in the business side of the music industry than in being the band's leader and delegated that role to its popular singer and guitarist Harry Davies. When Davis left the band and emigrated to USA in the mid 1950s its leadership was taken over by one of its saxophonists David Ede.

Oscar Rabin died of a heart attack at the age of 59 in June 1958 and the band became known as David Ede and the Rabin Band. The Oscar Rabin name was so highly regarded by the BBC that four days after his death they ran a tribute programme to him at 1.00 pm on the Light Programme.

By the late 1950s, rock and roll, particularly on records from USA, had begun to take a firm hold on the popular music scene in Britain and young people began clamouring to hear the music that they preferred. The BBC, however, operated under a government charter as the exclusive supplier of musical entertainment on British radio and television. The Light Programme had a few shows featuring gramophone records records such as "Housewives" Choice", "Family Favourites", "Pick of the Pops" etc but the BBC was bound by "needle time" restrictions imposed by the Musician's Union on the number of hours a day the BBC could devote to gramophone records. There were a few shows on the Light Programme that were able to feature cover versions of pop records such as those by the BBC's Northern Dance Orchestra, Midland Light Orchestra and varied bands and orchestras on the twice-daily "Music While You Work" but the young audience wanted to hear the actual sound of the records.

Dancehalls were a popular form of entertainment at the time and the Rabin Band was playing this style of music several nights a week as the resident band at the Wimbledon Palais in London. David Ede managed to persuade the BBCs 'fixer' of dance bands Jim Davidson that his band was well qualified to provide a dedicated weekly show directed to the teenage audience and the band was given a three-month trial to appear in a weekly one-hour radio show on the BBC Light Programme performing the pop music of the day.

== Programme format ==
The first edition began at 1.00 pm on Monday 29 December 1958 and was listed in the Radio Times as "Go, Man, Go a lunch-time session of rock, cha-cha, jazz and the top of the pops played by the Oscar Rabin Orchestra. Directed by David Ede." The listing credited singers Lorie Mann, Mel Gaynor, Ray Pilgrim and Colin Day along with vocal backing group the Hound Dogs and what became regular features Clarinet plus Five, The Jazz Bag and Groovin' Guitar.

For the first 100 episodes there were no formal guests on the show. The show consisted typically of the band's renditions of songs and music from the current pop charts. This changed in April 1961 when the format changed to include a jazz number each week by a group of band members loosely called the "Razz Ma Tazzers" and a weekly appearance by a British jazz performer with a definite predilection for the traditional ("trad") jazz style which had become popular at the time through bands such as those led by Chris Barber, Ken Colyer, Humphrey Lyttelton and many others. The show also included a generous share of big band music in which the band members were especially talented.

Gradually, the invitations to appear as a guest on the show became extended to "pop" artists in general either currently in or well-known in the popular music charts, no longer focusing strictly on traditional jazz. However, it wasn't until 17 August 1962 that an overseas guest Alvino Rey, an American jazz guitarist, appeared on the show. Six weeks later, Dion, an American artist on a promotional tour of the UK who was well-known for his hit record "Runaround Sue" appeared on the show and opened the path for subsequent American artists. Each week after that would see the appearance of one or more artists well known in the record charts.

Listener requests and dedications were encouraged ("on a postcard only please") and the show was linked by a resident compere. This role was performed by David Ede until April 1962 when jazz guitarist Diz Disley took it over for the remaining 37 episodes that year. He was followed by three week runs of Pick of the Pops compere Alan Freeman and disc jockey Tony Withers over the first six weeks of 1963 and later for a short spell by BBC staff announcer Don Moss who was not credited.

== Band personnel ==
At a minimum the band would perform on the show with three trumpets, one trombone, five saxes, piano, bass, guitar and drums plus one male and one female vocalist. In the show's heyday in 1962 and 1963 a typical line up would include Ian Hamer, Tony Mabbett and Derek Healey on trumpet; Charlie Messenger on trombone; Cecil Pressling, David Ede, Gene Cotterill, Johnny Evans, Bill Suett, and "Rocking" Rex Morris on saxes; Arthur Greenslade on piano; Laurie Steele on guitar; Andy White on drums; and Ron Prentice on bass. Female vocals were provided at various times by Lorie Mann, Barbara Kay and Kay Garner. Male vocalists included Ray Pilgrim (who was on the show for more than three years), Colin Day, Johnny Towers and Bobby Sansom. Johnny Towers originally appeared on the show under the name of Johnny Sherman but adopted the stage name Towers on the recommendation of the Philips record company which was releasing a record by him and wished to avoid confusion with American rock singer Bobby Sherman. The new name was announced on the show on 2 November 1962.

Most of the musicians were session men. Trombonist Charlie Messenger also managed to maintain a parallel career as a member of the band of H.M. Life Guards performing on horseback at ceremonial occasions. But apart from inevitable deputizing when a musician had a gig elsewhere, the band's line up on Go Man Go was the same as that at the Wimbledon Palais and remained relatively static from week to week.

When the style of music demanded, the band would split into smaller groups: Arthur Greenslade and the G-Men led by Greenslade on piano; Laurie Steele and the Steele Men led by Steele on guitar; the Rabin Stompers (for Dixieland jazz). Backing vocals came from the resident vocalists and the band members, particularly David Ede and saxophonist Johnny Evans, performing as "The Travellers", a pun on the show's title. Baritone saxophonist Bill Suett took on the comedy and novelty pieces.

== Production ==
The show ran almost every week for more than five years. The first 30 shows were "presented by" (BBC terminology for "produced by") John Hooper. Terry Henebery produced the next 200 shows and Don George produced the final twenty-six.

== End of Go Man Go ==
Popular music in Britain had begun to change significantly by the end of 1963 and was becoming dominated by small groups led by guitar-playing singers rather than the orchestra-backed solo vocalists of five years earlier. Discotheques and dance clubs were beginning to appear around the country and provided opportunities for young people to hear the sounds of their favourite artists on the original records rather than cover versions in dancehalls. Moreover, alternative opportunities to hear original records on radio were also becoming available, albeit illegally, when pirate radio stations such as Radio London and Radio Caroline began broadcasting from shipping vessels moored outside British territorial waters.

Oscar Rabin's son Bernard, whose company managed the band and owned Wimbledon Palais where it performed, began to find there was great interest in the venue for personal appearances by many of these small groups, especially after a highly publicised appearance there by the Beatles on 14 December 1963. (retrieved 3 December 2022). David Ede decided to take the band on tour around the country the following year. The final performance of 'Go Man Go' was on 27 March 1964.

== Death of David Ede ==
In April 1965, David Ede and the band went to Blackpool to begin what started as a successful residency at the newly-opened Mecca Locarno ballroom. Twelve weeks later, on 25 June 1965, Ede and 23-year-old Michael Taylor, one of the band's singers, went out on a leisure trip at sea on a 14 ft dinghy. The dinghy overturned in bad weather while they were out and Ede's body was washed ashore the following morning at Rossall Beach six miles north of Blackpool. Michael Taylor managed to swim ashore to safety four hours after the vessel overturned. The Rabin Band broke up soon after.
