= Go Man Go (disambiguation) =

Go Man Go may refer to:

- Go Man Go, a famous American Quarter Horse stallion and race horse
- Go Man Go (radio show), a British pop music show during the late 1950s and early 1960s
- Go, Man, Go! (film), a 1954 sports film about the Harlem Globetrotters
