= At the Sign of the Swingin' Cymbal =

"At the Sign of the Swingin' Cymbal" (alternatively titled "At the Sign of the Swinging Cymbal") is an instrumental piece of music written by Brian Fahey and first released in September 1960 under the name Brian Fahey and His Orchestra.

It is best known as Alan Freeman's signature song, having been used as the theme tune to his BBC Light Programme Pick of the Pops from 1961 to 1966. The original version was proposed to Freeman by the BBC producer Derek Chinnery. By April 1966 it was replaced as the main theme by "Quite Beside the Point" by the Harry Roberts Sound and written by Cliff Adams. But bits of the original "Swinging Cymbal" theme were used occasionally by as jingles in the show. From 5 April 1970, the show used a new version of "At The Sign of the Swinging Cymbal" arranged by former Ladybirds singer Barbara Moore and recorded by Brass Incorporated. This version is still used by the BBC today.

The Propellerheads modernised the song in their 1998 reimagining "Crash!" which was included on the second soundtrack of the film Austin Powers: The Spy Who Shagged Me. It was also used for several years as the music for the Radio 1 Top 40, following a brief outing of an alternative remix by Norman Cook.

== Background ==
After joining BBC Light Programme from Radio Luxembourg in 1961, Alan Freeman used the piece as his theme music for Records Around Five and a year later as the theme to Pick of the Pops.
