= Alan Freeman =

British radio disc jockey (1927–2006)

Alan Freeman MBE
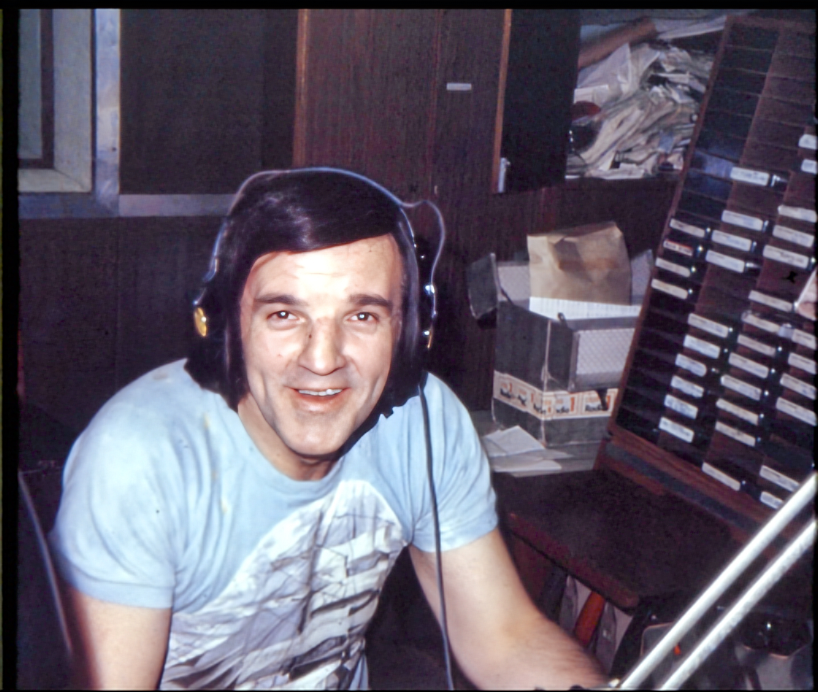
- Freeman presenting his daily afternoon show at BBC Radio 1, in 1973
- Born: Alan Leslie Freeman; 6 July 1927; Melbourne, Australia
- Died: 27 November 2006 (aged 79); Brinsworth House, London, England
- Years active: 1952–2001
- Presenting career
- Stations: Radio Luxembourg; BBC Light Programme (1960–1967); BBC Radio 1 (1967–1978, 1989–1993); Capital Radio (1979–1989); Capital Gold (1994–1997); BBC Radio 2 (1997–2000)
- Country: United Kingdom; Australia
- Previous shows: Pick of the Pops; The Rock Show; Their Greatest Bits
- Website: www.alanflufffreeman.co.uk

Alan Leslie Freeman MBE (6 July 1927 – 27 November 2006), nicknamed "Fluff", (Note: The origin of Freeman's nickname "Fluff" is unclear. It has been attributed to his mistake while presenting Top of the Pops when he announced "Cast Your Fate to the Wind" by Sounds Orchestral as "Cast Your Wind to the Fates". Alternatively, it may have derived from a fluffy jumper that he was fond of wearing.) was an Australian-born British disc jockey and radio personality in the United Kingdom for 40 years, best known for presenting Pick of the Pops from 1961 to 2000.

== Early life ==
Born and educated in Melbourne, Australia, Freeman worked as an assistant paymaster/accountant for one of Australia's largest timber companies after leaving school. He wanted to be an opera singer, but decided his voice was not strong enough.

== Career ==
=== Radio and television ===
Freeman was invited to audition as a radio announcer in 1952, and began work for 7LA in Tasmania, known as the teenagers' station. Freeman's duties included continuity announcer, presenter of musical programmes incorporating opera, ballet and classical music, DJ for the top 100, news reader, quizmaster and commercials reader.

After moving to radio station 3KZ in Melbourne, he took a nine-month trip around the world in 1957, with the promise to return to Melbourne by January 1958. He arrived in London, and on deciding to stay wrote numerous letters of delay, and later apology, to his former employer.

Freeman began his British career as a summer relief disc jockey on Radio Luxembourg and continued to present late evening programmes on the station until the early 1970s.

In 1960 he moved to the BBC Light Programme as presenter of the Records Around Five show, introduced by his signature tune, "At the Sign of the Swingin' Cymbal", written by Brian Fahey. A more upbeat version performed by Brass Incorporated was introduced in April 1970. In September 1961, he introduced Pick of the Pops as part of Saturday evening show Trad Tavern. Pick of the Pops became a permanent show in its own right; Freeman presented it until 24 September 1972, continuing with his 'Swingin' Cymbal' signature tune.

During this time he was one of the original team of presenters of BBC TV's Top of the Pops, a regular member of the Juke Box Jury panel, and had a brief stint as compère of the lunchtime pop music show Go Man Go on the Light Programme in 1963. In 1961 and 1962, he presented the British version of the hit American quiz Play Your Hunch on BBC TV. He presented a music magazine-style television show for the BBC in 1968, All Systems Freeman, which aired for several weeks on Friday evening, but despite good reviews did not return for a second series.

Freeman recorded a dance single, "Madison Time", with the Talmy Stone Band in 1962. Released by Decca Records, F11543, it was reportedly one of the label's worst-ever sellers.

In April 1972, he joined the daily presenters on Radio 1, taking over the 3–5 pm show from Terry Wogan. Freeman used "Soul Bossa Nova" by Quincy Jones as his theme until 1 June 1973. During this time he spotlighted youth clubs and young people, and became Vice-President of the London Association of Youth Clubs. During the 1970s he also presented the Radio 1 series Quiz Kid on Sunday evenings, recorded at youth clubs and boys' clubs all over the country, while on Saturday afternoons he presented a programme simply titled Alan Freeman, although retrospectively it is mainly referred to as The Rock Show. It featured an eclectic mix of music, although it is mainly remembered for pioneering heavy and progressive rock. It also featured a rundown of the current album chart. The show ran from 30 June 1973 to 26 August 1978.

He presented the original version of The Story of Pop as a 26-part Radio 1 series in 1973–74. From 1975 to 1977, Freeman presented the Radio 2 musical game show Free Spin. In addition he lent his name to several rock and classical compilation albums, the best-known being By Invitation Only (1976), a collection of material sourced from artists on the Atlantic label.

Freeman left the BBC to work for Capital Radio from 1979 to 1989, presenting the Top 40 of the 1970s on 31 December 1979 under the revived Pick of the Pops name. He again revived Pick of the Pops from 13 March 1982 (now called Pick of the Pops Take Two, combining the current NME Top 15 with an earlier chart) and The Rock Show previous to that on 7 January 1980. He returned to the BBC and Radio 1 in January 1989 to revive The Rock Show and Pick of the Pops. This run of Pick of the Pops ended on 27 December 1992 but he continued to host The Rock Show until 23 October 1993, when he, with other long-serving DJs, left the station as it was revamped by controller Matthew Bannister.

He was the subject of This Is Your Life in 1987 when he was surprised by Eamonn Andrews at Thames Television's Teddington Studios. In 1990, he appeared as a celebrity guest on the television series You Bet!, made by London Weekend Television and hosted by Sir Bruce Forsyth.

In December 1993, for four weeks he presented the Alternative Chart Show Top 30 as part of a trial one-off restricted service licence (RSL) broadcast by XFM in London. Throughout 1994 he presented a revised and expanded version of the Radio 1 series The Story of Pop, broadcast in 52-hour-long episodes. He then hosted Pick of the Pops Take Three on Capital Gold from April 1994 until January 1997. In 1996 and 1997 he also hosted The Friday Rock Show on Virgin Radio, and he hosted a number of one-off shows on Classic FM from December 1993 to December 1996.

In 1998 he was appointed MBE for services to broadcasting.

He returned to the BBC on Radio 2, taking Pick of the Pops back to its home, from 1997 until 2000. A lifetime love of classical music and particularly opera was developed in the show Their Greatest Bits, which resulted in another compilation CD on the BBC label. Throughout his career, he was known especially for his jingles, which integrated short bursts of classical music and hard rock segued together, as well as his catchphrases, which included "Hi there, pop pickers!" at the start of Pick of the Pops; "Greetings, music lovers!" when introducing his classical and rock shows; "All right? Right, stay bright!" when signing off, and "Not 'arf!" frequently uttered during his shows.

In April 2000, after arthritis in his hands had started to make it too difficult for him to operate studio equipment, he handed Pick of the Pops over to Dale Winton.

New editions of Their Greatest Bits continued to be recorded by Freeman until 2001.

=== Acting ===
Freeman acted in the horror film Dr. Terror's House of Horrors (1965) and the rock musical Absolute Beginners (1986), and played himself or a similar character in films such as It's Trad, Dad! (1962), Just for Fun (1963) and Sebastian (1968). He also played God (albeit a God who sat at a mixing desk and said "Alright?") in two episodes of The Young Ones in 1984. Freeman also appeared in TV advertisements for Brentford Nylons and for Omo "with exclusive WM7 for perfect whiteness."

He appeared in Noël Coward's Private Lives at the Adeline Genee Theatre in East Grinstead in June 1968, starring alongside Shirley Anne Field, Sally Anne Howe and Conrad Phillips.

=== Recognition ===
Freeman's style has been parodied, and he was the model for comedian Harry Enfield's character Dave Nice, although he contributed to the satire himself in good grace by appearing on Enfield's show. (Enfield praised Freeman in Simon Garfield's book on Radio 1, The Nation's Favourite, by categorising him along with John Peel as "DJs who loved music" as opposed to "DJs who loved the sound of their own voices, like Dave Lee Travis").

For all Freeman's supposed clichés and archetypes in his broadcasting style, he has been regarded as original by fellow broadcasters. When he appeared on John Peel's This Is Your Life, Peel said: "Fluff is the greatest out-and-out disc jockey of them all".

After Freeman's death Robin Gibb wrote a tribute, "Alan Freeman Days". Recorded in August 2007, the song was included on Gibb's first posthumous album 50 St. Catherine's Drive in 2014.

Black Sabbath dedicated the instrumental track "Fluff" on Sabbath Bloody Sabbath (composed by Tony Iommi) to Freeman, since he was one of the few radio personalities in Great Britain to play the group's music on-air.

In an episode of the BBC Radio 4 programme Great Lives broadcast in January 2024, Freeman was the choice of Simon Mayo.

== Honours ==
He was appointed Member of the Order of the British Empire (MBE) in 1998. In May 2000, he was presented with a Lifetime Achievement award at the Sony Radio Academy Awards. He was initiated into the Grand Order of Water Rats in 1976, and ten years later was elected "King Rat". He also served as Vice-President of the London Union of Youth Clubs.

== Personal life ==
In March 1994, Freeman revealed on breakfast television that he had become celibate in 1981, but had previously been bisexual. He was described by Graham Chapman as being "keen on motor bikes and leather and men".

From the early 1990s, Freeman suffered from arthritis and asthma (from a 60-a-day smoking habit) and used a Zimmer frame. He lived at Brinsworth House, a retirement home for actors and performers run by the Entertainment Artistes' Benevolent Fund in Twickenham, from 2000 until his death.

=== Death ===
He died on 27 November 2006 in Brinsworth House, aged 79, after a short illness. His funeral took place at South West Middlesex Crematorium on 7 December 2006, and was attended by singer Kenny Lynch, his producer Phil Swern and DJs including Dave Lee Travis, Ed Stewart, Dave Cash, Paul McKenna, Nicky Campbell, Paul Gambaccini and his Radio One Top 40 successors Wes Butters, Simon Bates and Richard Skinner.

== Filmography ==
Year	Title	Role	Notes
1962	It's Trad, Dad!	Himself	
1963	Just for Fun	Himself, Disc Jockey	
1964	Swinging U.K.	Himself, Disc Jockey	
1965	Dr. Terror's House of Horrors	Bill Rogers	Segment: "Creeping Vine"
1968	Sebastian	TV Disc Jockey	
1986	Absolute Beginners	Call-Me-Cobber	
1995	Mad Dogs and Englishmen	Disc Jockey	Final film role

== Notes ==
Media offices
Preceded by First	BBC Radio 1 chart show presenter 1 October 1967 – 24 September 1972	Succeeded by Tom Browne
