= Paul Rich =

English singer and music publisher (1921–2000)

Paul Rich (born Simon Rickelman; 20 August 1921 – 23 February 2000) was a singer and guitarist, recording many songs with Lou Preager's band. He later became a music publisher.

== Early life ==
Rich was born in Marylebone, London, in 1921, the son of immigrants from Russia. His birth name was Simon Rickelman.

== Career ==
Rich studied guitar with Ivor Mairants, and in 1941 became a singer and guitarist with the Oscar Rabin Band. In 1942 he joined Lou Preager, whose band had begun a residency at the Hammersmith Palais in London; Rich made many recordings with the band, including "Cruising Down the River" in 1946. He also sang and played guitar as a solo artist at venues in the West End of London.

In the 1950s, he appeared in a pub scene in the film Pool of London, which had music by Preager's band. He later appeared in a music hall scene in the film Counterspy.

Rich left Preager's band in 1955, to give more time to his business interests, having a chain of retail shops. From 1957 he recorded many songs for Woolworths' Embassy Records, until the record label closed in 1965.

In the 1960s he became involved in music publishing, and in 1967 became general manager of Carlin Music. For ten years between 1966 and 1976 the company received the UK's Top Publisher Award from Music Week. The company dealt with leading American songwriters and with leading British performers; it was a successful sub-publisher of notable US performers and catalogues. Rich retired in 1996.

== Personal life ==
In 1952 at Bayswater Synagogue he married Marion White; they had a son, Clive, who became a barrister. Paul Rich was a Freemason, initiated into Chelsea Lodge No. 3098 in January 1960; he was Worshipful Master in 1979 and 1999. He died in 2000, following a heart attack.
