= Charlie Chalk =

1988 British TV series

- Title card
- Created by: Ivor Wood
- Written by: Jocelyn Stevenson
- Directed by: Derek Mogford
- Starring: Michael Williams; John Wells; Barbara Leigh-Hunt
- Opening theme: "Charlie Chalk" sung by Ken Barrie
- Ending theme: "Charlie Chalk (Different Version)" sung by Ken Barrie
- Composer: Mike Redway
- Country of origin: United Kingdom
- Original language: English
- No. of series: 1
- No. of episodes: 13

Production
- Producer: Ivor Wood
- Editor: Martin Bohan
- Running time: 15 minutes per episode (approx)
- Production company: Woodland Animations

Original release
- Network: BBC1
- Release: 20 October 1988 – 19 April 1989

Charlie Chalk is a British stop motion animation series produced in 1987 in the United Kingdom by Woodland Animations, who also produced the children's television programmes Postman Pat, Gran, and Bertha. Reception to the show was mostly positive. The series began airing from 20 October 1988, Thursday afternoons on BBC1 part of Children's BBC for the first 10 episodes. The remaining three episodes of the series aired on BBC2 in a lunchtime slot.

The series is available to watch on BritBox and Prime Video.

== Synopsis ==
The series tells the story of Charlie Chalk – a jolly clown who, after falling asleep whilst fishing out at sea, ends up on a strange island by the name of Merrytwit (as explained in the title sequence before each episode). Characters had to be aware of coconuts which constantly fell from the trees on the island.

The pilot episode of the series (entitled "Shipwrecked Charlie") finds Charlie having just landed on Merrytwit, and after making friends with some of its inhabitants, decides to stay and build a home there. The following episodes follow Charlie and his new friends on various adventures on the island.

== Main characters ==
- Charlie Chalk – A good-natured, friendly and peaceful clown who was out on a fishing trip when he ended up on Merrytwit Island. In the series' theme tune, he is described as having "a funny way of walking and a wacky way of chalking". His 'funny way of walking' is demonstrated when, on occasion, he tumbles in an acrobatic circus-style through frames, around obstacles, or just to show folks how happy he is. He also has the ability to do magic tricks. He is voiced by Michael Williams (speaking) and Ken Barrie (singing).
- Captain Mildred – The boss of the island (a parody of then-Prime Minister Margaret Thatcher), who loves to see everyone hard at work and has the practice of listing things that have to be done: "a: do this; b: do that" etc. She lives on the beached ship Buttercup.
- Mary the Hover Fairy – An elderly fairy who often proves useful due to her ability to cast spells, provided her magic wand, Houdini, has not wandered off again. She is getting old, so has decided to settle down on Merrytwit. She now lives on Buttercup, serving as Mildred's first mate.
- Lewis T. Duck – A small duck with a short temper. He is full of ideas, and believes them to be the best, so is quick to inform people that he is "always right". He can be quite friendly but lacks patience. The 'T' stands for 'The'. His catchphrase is "Arnold!"
- Arnold the Elephant – A pink elephant who is quite jolly, but also very clumsy, much to the annoyance of Lewis, who always seems to be on the receiving end of Arnold's bouts of clumsiness.
- Edward – A gorilla who spends his time sleeping and has quite a dislike for work.
- Trader Jones – The island's odd job man. Not only does he drive a bike which acts as a taxi and a means of transporting goods, he also owns a general supplies store on the island: 'if you want it, he's got it.' He never accepts money, he only trades e.g. a supply of bananas may cost a day's beachcombing.
- Bert – An ogre discovered by Charlie, Arnold and Lewis in the episode The Mountain That Moaned. He lives inside a cave, and whilst extremely friendly, he is quite lacking in intelligence.
- Litterbug – A tiny little bug who is kept busy tidying up litter around the island. He often complains about the amount of litter, but does not realise there would be far less litter if his sack did not have a hole in it. Being so tiny, he is not always noticed, a fact which further frustrates him.
- Ponka - A toucan who appears only during the coconut harvest time. Her job is to remove the husks from the coconuts with her beak. She carries a hand mirror with her. Trader Jones mentions they don't see her around Merrytwit more often.
- Rabbit - a rabbit who was the first local Charlie met when he arrived on Merrytwit. He was the brother of another rabbit who appeared in The Coconut Harvest.

== Episodes ==
The series consisted of 13 original episodes, as listed below:

| No. | Title | Original release date |
|---|---|---|
| 1 | "Shipwrecked Charlie" | 20 October 1988 |
Charlie lands on Merrytwit and meets Edward, Trader Jones, Captain Mildred, Arnold, and Lewis T. Duck. They all agree that the first thing Charlie must do is build a house but where? Even then choosing the best location proves difficult.
| 2 | "Arnold's Night Out" | 27 October 1988 |
Charlie finds a treasure map and he, Lewis and Arnold the Elephant (who is lovable but very clumsy) decide to go looking for the treasure but become confused and fall out with each other. Arnold ends up finding the treasure after walking through the night.
| 3 | "The Coconut Harvest" | 3 November 1988 |
In the middle of the coconut harvest, Trader Jones makes a wish and, before anyone knows what has happened, Mary the Hover Fairy appears. She grants Trader's wish but he discovers that magic is not the best way to harvest coconuts.
| 4 | "The Sneezes" | 10 November 1988 |
Charlie unfortunately has to cancel the big expedition to find the Bye Bye Beast because he has got the sneezes. But when Trader Jones' cure for the dread disease happens to include the elusive Beast's favourite food, Charlie's luck changes.
| 5 | "Jumping Bananas" | 17 November 1988 |
Litterbug, on his constant quest for tidiness, picks up Mary the Hover Fairy's wand when she puts it down halfway through a spell. Later he discovers that there could be such a thing as being too tidy.
| 6 | "The Mountain That Moaned" | 24 November 1988 |
One day Arnold claims that the mountain moaned and no one believes him. So Charlie and Lewis decide to set off and see why the mountain moans. The mountain leads them to a new friend, Bert.
| 7 | "Edward Keeps Fit" | 1 December 1988 |
It is inspection day on Merrytwit and Captain Mildred decides it is time lazy Edward took some exercise.
| 8 | "The Feast" | 8 December 1988 |
Charlie is helping Trader Jones beach combing when they stumble upon a cookery book. Trader decides to prepare the first Merrytwit feast, but when coconuts and bananas are the only ingredients available, the feast does not quite work out as planned.
| 9 | "There Are No Roads on Merrytwit" | 15 December 1988 |
Lewis T. Duck, who is always right, is dismayed to discover that there are no roads on Merrytwit. So he decides to build one.
| 10 | "Mildred's Day Off" | 22 December 1988 |
Captain Mildred is becoming bored of her day-to-day life of living on her boat she calls a home, so she decided to take her best friend Mary the Hover Fairy with her on a short holiday to the other side of the island, and decides that who arrives first on her ship will become acting captain. Unfortunately, that happens to be Edward, sleepwalking ...
| 11 | "Bert's Boring Day" | 5 April 1989 |
The cave monster Bert is having a boring day, he has run out of interesting things to do in Merrytwit, but his day soon livens up when his friends plan a day full of fun.
| 12 | "Return of the Litter" | 12 April 1989 |
It will soon be Litterbug's birthday; Charlie and the other inhabitants of Merrytwit cannot think of a gift to give Litterbug for his birthday, they decide to explore the island for the perfect gift.
| 13 | "Goodbye, Hello" | 19 April 1989 |
Although Charlie is enjoying his new life on Merrytwit, he also misses the circus and his old friends back home, so Charlie decides to say goodbye to Merrytwit and his newfound friends and go back to his old life as a clown, but in the end decides to stay on Merrytwit. Clips from previous episodes are shown (although certain moments from "Arnold's Night Out" are re-shot and re-dubbed).

== Home media ==
=== UK VHS releases ===
All 13 episodes were released on three VHS tapes by BBC Video in the UK between 1988 and 1991.

| VHS video title | Year of release | Episodes |
|---|---|---|
| Charlie Chalk – Shipwrecked Charlie (BBCV 4195) | 24 October 1988 | "Shipwrecked Charlie"; "Arnold's Night Out"; "Coconut Harvest"; "Sneezes"; "Jumping Bananas" |
| Charlie Chalk – The Mountain That Moaned (BBCV 4427) | 5 November 1990 | "The Mountain That Moaned"; "Edward Keeps Fit"; "The Feast"; "There are No Roads on Merrytwit" |
| Charlie Chalk – Mildred's Day Off (BBCV 4636) | 1 July 1991 | "Mildred's Day Off"; "Bert's Boring Day"; "Return of the Litter"; "Goodbye Hello" |

In 1995, Tempo Video released nine episodes on VHS.

| VHS video title | Year of release | Episodes |
|---|---|---|
| Charlie Chalk – Jumping Bananas (975927) | 7 August 1995 | "Sneezes"; "Return of the Litter"; "Mildred's Day Off"; "The Feast"; "Jumping Bananas" |
| Charlie Chalk – There are No Roads on Merrytwit (978225) | 7 August 1995 | 'There are No Roads on Merrytwit' and 'Edward Keeps Fit' |
| Charlie Chalk – Coconut Harvest (986725) | 7 August 1995 | 'Coconut Harvest' and 'Goodbye, Hello' |

From 1999 to 2000, Contender Entertainment released nine episodes on VHS as part of their "Nippers" sub-label.

| VHS video title | Year of release | Episodes |
|---|---|---|
| Charlie Chalk Bumper Video (NIP11063) | 1 February 1999 | "Shipwrecked Charlie"; "Arnold's Night Out"; "The Coconut Harvest"; "Sneezes"; "Jumping Bananas" |
| The Adventures of Charlie Chalk (NIP11085) | 7 February 2000 | "The Mountain That Moaned"; "Edward Keeps Fit"; "Mildred's Day Off"; "Return of The Litter" |

== Merchandise ==
- In 1994, Redrock Records released a Charlie Chalk LP. It included the several incidental songs played on the show and the full Charlie Chalk theme song which includes some previously unheard lyrics.
- A Charlie Chalk CD has been released in the United States.
- The UK-based restaurant chain Brewers Fayre originally used Charlie Chalk as their mascot.
- Charlie Chalk Fun Factory was a soft play area for young children, once found in large pubs across the United Kingdom, and now only found around Aberdeen.
- Charlie Chalk – The Complete Series features all 13 episodes of the series and is currently available in the UK on a single-disc DVD release. It was released by Entertainment Rights plc and distributed by Universal Pictures Home Entertainment in 2005.

== Broadcast ==
- The series originally first aired on BBC1 in the UK on 20 October 1988 until 22 December 1988 for the first 10 episodes and moved to BBC2 for the remaining three.
- It later aired on cable television, being shown on Sky One as part of The DJ Kat Show and later on The Children's Channel as part of their pre-school programming block Tiny TCC.
- The series was later broadcast in various countries around the world, including ABC in Australia, NBC in Namibia, M-Net and Bop TV in South Africa, GBC in Gibraltar, Channel 5 in Singapore, YTV in Canada, RTÉ One and RTÉ Two in the Republic of Ireland, TVNZ 1 and TVNZ 2 in New Zealand, TVB Pearl in Hong Kong and NRK in Norway.
- The series was dubbed in Scottish Gaelic and broadcast under the title Callum an Cailc by BBC Alba.

== Voice cast ==
- Michael Williams as Charlie Chalk / Lewis T. Duck / Trader Jones / Litterbug / Rabbit
- Barbara Leigh-Hunt as Captain Mildred / Mary the Hover Fairy / Ponka the Toucan
- John Wells as Arnold the Elephant / Edward / Bert
- Ken Barrie as Song vocals
- Joan Baxter as Song vocals
- Mike Redway as Song vocals
