= Verities & Balderdash =

Studio album by Harry Chapin
- Released: August 1974
- Recorded: 1973–1974
- Studios: Connecticut Recording Studios, Bridgeport, Connecticut
- Length: 43:49
- Labels: Elektra; 7E-1012
- Producer: Paul Leka

Harry Chapin chronology
Short Stories (1973)	Verities & Balderdash (1974)	Portrait Gallery (1975)

Singles from Verities & Balderdash
- 1. "What Made America Famous?" Released: August 1974; 2. "I Wanna Learn a Love Song" Released: August 1974; 3. "Cat's in the Cradle" Released: October 1, 1974

Professional ratings
Review scores
Source	Rating
AllMusic	4.5/5 stars
Tom Hull	D

Verities & Balderdash is the fourth studio album by the American singer/songwriter Harry Chapin, released in 1974. "Cat's in the Cradle" was Chapin's highest-charting single, finishing at number 38 for the year on the 1974 Billboard year-end Hot 100 chart. The follow-up single, "I Wanna Learn a Love Song," charted on the Billboard Hot 100 Singles Chart at number 44, and Billboard Adult Contemporary at number 7. A promotional single, "What Made America Famous?", was released to radio stations as a 45 rpm single. The album was certified Gold on December 17, 1974.

The album was advertised with the slogan: "As only Harry can tell it."

== Track listing ==
All tracks written by Harry Chapin, except where noted.

Side one
No.	Title	Length
1.	"Cat's in the Cradle" (Written by Sandy Chapin and Harry Chapin)	3:44
2.	"I Wanna Learn a Love Song"	4:19
3.	"Shooting Star"	4:02
4.	"30,000 Pounds of Bananas"	5:45
5.	"She Sings Songs Without Words"	3:31

Side two
No.	Title	Length
1.	"What Made America Famous?"	6:53
2.	"Vacancy"	4:00
3.	"Halfway to Heaven"	6:10
4.	"Six String Orchestra"	5:25

== Personnel ==
Band

- Harry Chapin - guitar, lead vocals
- John Tropea - acoustic guitar, sitar
- Don Payne - bass
- Allan Schwartzberg - drums
- Don Grolnick - piano, electric piano, harpsichord
- Ron Bacchiocchi - synthesizer
- Tom Chapin - banjo
- Irving Spice - concertmaster
- George Simms - background vocals
- Frank Simms - background vocals
- Dave Kondziela - background vocals
- Zizi Roberts - female vocals

Production

- Ron Bacchiocchi - recording engineer
- Grant Ames - recording engineer
- Paul Leka - mixing
- Fred Kewley - mixing
- Glen Christensen - art direction
- Bill Hofman - illustration
- Ruth Bernal - photography
- Shiah Grumet - design

== Charts and certifications ==
=== Weekly charts ===
Chart (1974–75)	Peak position
Australian Album (Kent Music Report)	15
Canada Top Albums/CDs (RPM)	3
US Billboard 200	4

=== Year-end charts ===
Chart (1974)	Position
Canada Top Albums/CDs (RPM)	99
Chart (1975)	Position
Canada Top Albums/CDs (RPM)	28
US Billboard 200	48

=== Certifications ===
Region	Certification	Certified units/sales
United States (RIAA)	Gold	500,000^{^}
^{^} Shipments figures based on certification alone.
