= Arthur Greenslade =

British conductor and arranger

Arthur Greenslade (4 May 1923 – 27 November 2003) was a British conductor and arranger for films and television, as well as for a number of performers. He was most musically active in the 1960s and 1970s.

== Early career ==
Greenslade was born in Northfleet, Kent. He began playing the piano at the age of four, joining a band in Gillingham as a semi-professional, alongside peers such as Ronnie Verrell and Tommy Whittle. In the 1950s, he gained experience playing in the bands of Cyril Stapleton, Vic Lewis and Carl Barriteau before emerging as the pianist and arranger with the Oscar Rabin Band. With the Rabin Band he participated in a BBC radio series, Go Man Go, for five years. His own band, Arthur Greenslade and the G-Men, featured on the BBC's Saturday Club.

== Arranger and conductor ==
Greenslade arranged for Jack Jones, Chris Farlowe, Serge Gainsbourg ("Je T'Aime ... Moi Non Plus"), Genesis, Cat Stevens, Diana Ross, Dusty Springfield, the Bachelors ("I Believe") and Kinderjazz. With Andrew Loog Oldham he wrote "Headlines", the B-side of "Ride on Baby" (IM 038), by Chris Farlowe, which was released in 1966. He arranged Ireland's 1973 Eurovision Song Contest entry, "Do I Dream", sung by Maxi.

== Musical Director ==
Before a ten year stint with Shirley Bassey Greenslade was director of music for Engelbert Humperdinck for five years. He also worked with Rod McKuen, conducting the orchestra for his first television special, which aired on NBC in May 1969. He collaborated with McKuen on the film scores for Joanna (1968), The Prime of Miss Jean Brodie (1969), and Scandalous John (1971). In the UK he conducted the London Philharmonic Orchestra and four Royal Command Performances. In the US he arranged and conducted for Rock Hudson and Bill Cosby, and conducted at Carnegie Hall and the Hollywood Bowl.

As Bassey's musical director, from 1971 and into the early 1980s, he was the arranger and conductor of her 1970s television shows, and of the songs "Goldfinger" and "Send In the Clowns". He was arranger and conductor on the Shirley Bassey albums And I Love You So, Never Never Never, Good, Bad but Beautiful, Love, Life and Feelings, and You Take My Heart Away.

== Australia ==
Greenslade first visited Australia while working as musical director for Rod McKuen. He and his wife eventually moved there to live. In later life he kept up his musical activities, working with Tommy Tycho and with Jackie Trent and Tony Hatch. He died in Sydney in 2003 at the age of 80, following a heart attack.
