= Ken Mackintosh =

English bandleader (1919–2005)

Kenneth Victor Mackintosh (4 August 1919 – 22 November 2005) was an English saxophonist, composer and bandleader. He accompanied singers such as Tom Jones, Shirley Bassey and Matt Monro.

== Early life ==
Mackintosh was born in Liversedge, Yorkshire. He was born in Halifax Road, near Knowler Hill, and devoted his life to music, after buying his first alto saxophone at the age of 15. His father was an amateur musician.

== Career ==
After a period in the Army, he went to London, and joined various big bands, such as the Oscar Rabin Band. Following the Second World War, he formed his own orchestra, making appearances at the Astoria Ballroom, Nottingham. He brought his band to the Wimbledon Palais in London, touring extensively at home and abroad. He also had great singing strength with such well-versed vocalists as Kenny Bardell, Gordon Langhorn and The Mackpies. His orchestra was featured on BBC Radio almost every week in the 1950s and early 1960s. In 1955, he appeared in the BBC Light Programme's "festival of dance music" at the Royal Albert Hall in London.

A jovial character, Mackintosh enjoyed a joke and told the following story against himself. When travelling to a one-night stand in the West Country, he stopped to give a lift to an RAF serviceman hitch-hiking back to his base near Gloucester. The topic of conversation turned to the young man's appreciation of various entertainments put on by the authorities and how much he had enjoyed the visits of Joe Loss, Johnny Dankworth and Ted Heath. There was one band which he could not stand, however, and that was the one led by Ken Mackintosh, who he thought was "lousy". Before the aircraftsman departed at the gates, Mackintosh handed over his card, whereupon the car was rapidly vacated.

Mackintosh also wrote his own music, such as "The Creep" (written under the pseudonym Andy Burton, with Brian Fahey). He had three entries in the UK Singles Chart between 1954 and 1960, with "The Creep" being his highest placed hit record, reaching No. 10 in January 1954. Among his fans was the Queen Mother, for whom he played twice at Windsor Castle. Mackintosh also dedicated a great deal of his time to helping local musicians. During the late 1980s, Mackintosh would hold sax quintet practise evenings at his house on Streatham Common, as well as holding big band practice nights at the church hall next to his favourite pub, The Pied Bull. Towards the end of his life he was awarded the Freedom of the City of London. Until the months before his death, he was still occasionally playing and leading a local orchestra.

== Personal life and death ==
In 1944, Mackintosh married Elsie Burton; the couple had a son and daughter. Elsie died in 1986, predeceasing her husband. Mackintosh was an "enthusiastic radio ham", and restored vintage cars with the skills he had learnt during the war in the Royal Army Service Corps machine workshops.

Mackintosh died in Mitcham, Surrey, in November 2005, aged 86.
