= Oscar Rabin Band =

British dance band

The Oscar Rabin Band was a popular British dance band in the first half of the twentieth century.

== Formation ==
Oscar Rabin formed his first band with Harry Davis, the Romany Five at the Palace Hotel in Southend in 1924 in which Rabin played violin and Davis played banjo and sang. Later the band moved to the north of England and expanded to eight players. During the next decade they formed a dance band in which Oscar played bass saxophone. The band returned to London at the beginning of the 1930s for an engagement at the Wimbledon Palais in London, by which time it had expanded to nine players. They stayed at Wimbledon for two years after which they moved to the upmarket Astoria in Charing Cross Road. Later in the 1930s British actor Sam Kydd acted as the band's master of ceremonies.

Oscar Rabin seldom led the band. His role was to run the business side. His partner Harry Davis, who occasionally played guitar, was good with audiences and conducted the band while Oscar remained in the saxophone section. Following the release of their record “It’s Gonna Be You” with Davis on vocal, the band embarked upon a prolific recording and broadcasting career in which they released at least 58 double-sided gramophone records. Harry's daughter Beryl Davis joined the band as a singer in 1936.

== Key players ==
The band usually consisted of fifteen members, with two or three vocalists. Many well known musicians played in the band over the years. At different times, they included Ken Mackintosh and Cecil Pressling (alto saxophone), Don Rendell (tenor saxophone), Bobby Benstead and Jimmy Deuchar (trumpet), Ken Wray (trombone), Eric Jupp and Arthur Greenslade (piano/arrangers) and Kenny Clare (drums).

Vocalists included Dennis Hale, Marjorie Daw, Marion Davis, Patti Forbes, Marion Williams, Bob Dale, and Oscar's daughter-in-law, who performed under the pseudonym Diane (without a credited surname).

In 1951, the band was given a three-month trial at the Lyceum Ballroom in the Strand in central London, an engagement that eventually lasted over five years.

In 1953, Harry Davis left the band and the UK, breaking up the partnership with Rabin that had lasted for 30 years, and went to live with his daughter Beryl and her husband in California. He was replaced as bandleader by David Ede, a clarinet and saxophone player. Ede had been with the band for around five years, done some of its arrangements, and was part of the vocal quartet.

== Later history ==
Following its residency at the Lyceum in the 1950s, the band moved to the Wimbledon Palais in November 1958 under the direction of David Ede and the management of Oscar's son Bernard. Personnel included Arthur Greenslade (piano), Sammy Stokes, Ron Prentice (bass), Freddy Adamson (drums), Don Sanford (guitar), Cecil Pressling (alto), Rex Morris (tenor), David Ede (alto and tenor), and Don Honeywill (baritone). The vocalists were Ray Pilgrim, Colin Day and Lorie Mann, with Mike Redway replacing Day and Barbara Kay replacing Mann. This was the period of the band's longest running BBC radio series, the Go Man Go programme which ran weekly for more than five years. Trumpet player Ron Simmons who was a member of the band during this period provides some amusing recollections of his time there. Brian Haden joined the band in 1957, having previously played with the Basil Kirchin band

In 1965 the band broke up after the death of David Ede, who drowned in a sailing accident off Blackpool. But the Rabin name in music was carried on with the Mike Rabin Band led by Oscar's grandson who performed regularly with his group ‘The Demons’ at Wimbledon Palais until the venue was sold in 1968.
