= Kinderjazz =

- Origin: Sydney, Australia
- Years active: 1997 – 2017
- Past members: see Members below
- Website: kinderjazz.com

Kinderjazz is a 12 piece big band for young children. It was founded in 1997 by Christobel and David Llewellyn as a way to encourage children with live music. Christobel Llewellyn, sole producer and specialist in music education, has described Kinderjazz's mission as "marinating children in the sound of acoustic instruments playing a wide variety of rhythms, melody, harmony and solos to encourage their spontaneity, develop their creativity and nurture their growing brains in the process". It has performed mainly in New South Wales, specifically Sydney, and has sold out 30 concerts at the Sydney Opera House.

Kinderjazz has produced seven albums and was featured on Putumayo's Jazz Playground CD in 2010. The music and lyrics are written by David Llewellyn and have been arranged by a number of musicians, including Arthur Greenslade, Andrew Robertson, Andrew Heading and Bill Motzing. It currently consists of two singers, male and female, two alto saxophones, tenor saxophone, two trumpets, trombone, piano, double bass, drums and congas.

== History ==
Christobel Llewellyn founded the band together with her partner David Llewellyn as a means for young children to learn about music and instruments used in a jazz orchestra. Originally, Kinderjazz started as a 10 piece but after a chance meeting at Billy Hyde's music store in Sydney with Latin Percussionist Aykho Akhrif, the band soon added an eleventh musician on Congas. Aykho has inspired many Latin charts for the band with five of these being named after him. The twelfth member was a second trumpet, Elizabeth Geyer who decided to go solo shortly after joining, making way for Tom McElvogue to replace her.

In 1999, the band was augmented to accommodate 21 musicians as a one off. For the later recordings a Baritone Saxophone was used to augment the sound.

After performing mainly in suburban clubs, local schools and Sydney Festivals, Kinderjazz was booked in 2008 by the Sydney Opera House to perform 30 concerts as part of the Baby Proms Programme. These concerts were so well attended the band reached a global following with families coming from America and Europe to see them live in concert.

Kinderjazz has several projects in the pipeline mainly aimed at television. Having now recorded 100 songs, their considerable experience is being filmed by Filigree Films as a full-length documentary.

== Musical style and influences ==
Kinderjazz primarily plays a Big Band style, though they have performed and recorded the following styles:

- Swing
- Latin
- Bebop
- Blues
- Boogie
- Funk
- Country and Western
- Rock
- Sixties

Kinderjazz's sound has been described as Duke Ellington meets Sesame Street.

== Band members ==
- Alto Saxophones: Glenn Henrich, Hylton Mowday, Vanessa Patterson
- Congas: Aykho Akhrif
- Double Bass: Brendan Clarke, Karl Dunnicliff, David Groves
- Drums: Jamie Castrisos, Paul Derricott, Martin Highland, Chad Wackerman
- Piano: Ray Alldridge, Kevin Hunt
- Tenor Saxophone: Jason Morphett
- Trumpets: Al Davey, Elizabeth Geyer, Mike Kenny, Tom McElvogue
- Vocals: Jessica O’Donoghue, George Washingmachine

=== Sound engineer ===
- Guy Dickerson

=== Guest members ===
- Tuba: Brendon Lukin

=== Trombone septet ===
- Nigel Crocker
- James Greening
- Ben Greenslade-Stanton
- Andrew Heading
- Lucian McGuinnes
- Bob McIvor
- Alex Silver

== Discography ==
1. Kinderjazz (1997)
2. Latino Bambino (1998)
3. Swing Right Through This Town (1999)
4. Tu-Baba-Luma (2001)
5. Gazooba (2004)
6. The One For Me (2007)
7. Teddy Bear's Picnic (2015)

'Gazooba' included in Putumayo's Jazz Playgrounds CD (2010)

== Awards ==
Putumayo's Jazz Playground CD won Parent’s Choice GOLD Award for 2010.

Founder Christobel Llewellyn received Australian Citizen of the Year 2012 for services to children’s music education.

CMG Global Radio All Indie/All Genre's No. 1 in the Top 20 for 'Razzmatazz' 6 February 2016
