= Cruising Down the River =

1946 song

"Cruising Down the River" is a 1946 popular song, which became the winner of a public songwriting competition held in the UK. Words and music were entered by two middle-aged women named Eily Beadell and Nell Tollerton. The song subsequently achieved success in both Britain and America.

== Background ==
The words had been written by Eily Beadell in the 1920s. In the 1911 Census, she was listed as a 'concert singer', and as a 'professional singer and Variety artist (travelling)' in the 1939 Census.

The melody was composed by music hall artist Ena Dayne; as she could not read music, it was transcribed by Nell Tollerton. It was sung in concert parties throughout the 1930s, mainly by Charles Ray.

At the Hammersmith Palais, on Monday 26 November 1945, Beadell and Tollerton received a cheque on stage for £1,000, winning the songwriting contest which had received 73,000 entries. They were both dressmakers from Lavender Hill in south London, and said they wrote the song together in between doing housework. Both had previously been unsuccessful with their compositions. Beadell had written 20 songs in the previous 15 years, all being rejected by publishers, whilst Tollerton had written 60 since she was nine years old, without success. "We never expected to win," Beadell said, "and now we have got the money we shall invest some of it in war savings and some will provide us with a slap-up holiday cruising down a river, maybe, when the warmer weather comes." Lou Preager, whose band had performed the tunes, said, "The song is of high quality and should be a hit."

== Popularity ==
One of the original early recordings of this song, issued in the UK in January 1946 on the Columbia record label (FB 3180), was by Lou Preager and his Orchestra, with vocals by Paul Rich. This version was immensely popular on radio, with record and sheet music sales making it one of the biggest hits of 1946 in the United Kingdom.

The recording by Blue Barron was released by MGM Records as catalog number 10346. It first reached the Billboard Best Seller chart on January 21, 1949, and lasted 19 weeks on the chart, peaking at No. 1.

The recording by Russ Morgan was released by Decca Records as catalog number 24568. It first reached the Billboard Best Seller chart on February 18, 1949, and lasted 22 weeks on the chart, peaking at No. 1. The song became one of the biggest hits of his career, as well as one of his signature songs. The recording was a two-sided hit, as the flip side, "Sunflower," also reached No. 10 on the chart.

The recording by Jack Smith was released by Capitol Records as catalog number 15372. It first reached the Billboard Best Seller chart on February 25, 1949, and lasted 11 weeks on the chart, peaking at No. 14.

The recording by Primo Scala and the Keynotes was released by London Records as catalog number 356. It reached the Billboard Best Seller chart on March 4, 1949, at No. 27, its only week on the chart.

The recording by Frankie Carle was released by Columbia Records as catalog number 38411. It reached the Billboard Best Seller chart on April 22, 1949, at No. 28, its only week on the chart.

== Later versions ==
The song was performed by Dick Haymes in the 1953 film Cruisin' Down the River.

It has been covered numerous times by various artists, including Connie Francis on her 1959 album My Thanks to You. It was also included in a medley by Vera Lynn on her 1966 album More Hits of the Blitz.

Preceded by "A Little Bird Told Me" by Evelyn Knight	U.S. Billboard Best Sellers in Stores number-one single March 12–19, 1949 by Blue Barron; March 26–May 7, 1949, by Russ Morgan	Succeeded by "(Ghost) Riders in the Sky: A Cowboy Legend" by Vaughn Monroe
