= Sings (Conway Twitty album) =

Studio album by Conway Twitty
- Released: 1959
- Genre: Rock and roll, rockabilly
- Label: MGM

Conway Twitty chronology
| Sings (1959) | Saturday Night with Conway Twitty (1959) |

Sings or Conway Twitty Sings is the debut album from Conway Twitty released in 1959. It should not be confused with a later album of the same name in 1966 that had completely different tracks.

Three of the songs on the album were released as singles and became hits, with the biggest being "It's Only Make Believe," which reached No. 1 on the Billboard Hot 100. "Story of My Love" and a cover of the Nat King Cole song "Mona Lisa" both reached the top 40. The album itself made no impact on any charts.

== Track listing ==
All tracks composed by Conway Twitty and Jack Nance; except where indicated

1. "It's Only Make Believe"
2. "Hallelujah, I Love Her So" (Ray Charles)
3. "First Romance" (Twitty, Neal Matthews Jr.)
4. "Make Me Know You're Mine" (Aaron Schroeder, David Hill)
5. "Sentimental Journey" (Ben Homer, Bud Green, Les Brown)
6. "I Vibrate (From My Head to My Feet)"
7. "Story of My Love"
8. "I'll Try"
9. "You'll Never Walk Alone" (Oscar Hammerstein II, Richard Rodgers)
10. "Don't You Know"
11. "My One and Only You"
12. "Mona Lisa" (Jay Livingston, Ray Evans)
