= Syd Dale =

- Born: 20 May 1924; York, England
- Died: 15 August 1994 (aged 70) Surrey, England
- Genre: Easy listening
- Occupations: Composer, arranger
- Instrument: Piano
- Label: Amphonic Music Ltd

Syd Dale (20 May 1924 – 15 August 1994) was an English self-taught composer and arranger of big band, easy listening and library music. His themes and underscore music played an important role on television, radio and advertising media of the 1960s and 1970s and many cues are still in use today.

== Biography ==
Dale was born in York, and started as an apprentice technician at Rowntree's chocolate factory at 16. Soon big band music became his passion. He spent as much time as possible listening to bands and studying the arrangements. Three years later, in 1945, he left the factory and joined several local bands as pianist and arranger.

In 1952 he was recruited as a pianist with The Squadronaires, the dance orchestra of the Royal Air Force, where he worked with the conductor Ronnie Aldrich. The band toured extensively. In February 1953 they recorded Dale's arrangement of "Jeepers Creepers," his first recording session. He also played in several London hotels, and later joined the Cyril Stapleton Show Band. Dale married his wife Audrey while he was still working at Rowntree's. In 1958 the twins Ian and Erica were born, and the family were living in Maida Vale. In 1960 they moved to 1, Turpington Lane in Bromley. A decade later he was able to buy the mansion Kerchesters, Waterhouse Lane, Kingswood, Surrey, from where he ran his own studios and record label.

On 15 August 1994, Dale died at the age of 70.

== Television music ==
In the late 1950s he acted as musical director on Six-Five Special (1957), Oh Boy (1958) and Braden's Week (1968), and also forged links with record labels Decca and Island Records, where he worked as an arranger. His music, which emphasized melody and harmony with intricate arrangements, was composed for many television and radio projects. Decca issued the single "C'mon In"/"Disc a Go Go" in 1965, and "It Started with Eve"/"The Hellraisers" in 1966. Both were taken up by radio and television, with "The Hellraisers" used as the theme tune to Orlando, an Associated Rediffusion children's television thriller serial starring Sam Kydd which ran for 76 episodes from 1965 to 1968.

== Music libraries ==
Dale entered the world of library music in 1965, when he produced a set of 16 pieces for music publishing company Josef Weinberger, recorded at Lansdowne Studios. They were issued that year on two 10-inch vinyl LPs in Weinberger's Audio series, and ten years later as the 12-inch album Strictly for the Birds/Straight Down the Middle. Included was the track "Marching There and Back," which became familiar from 1970 as the signature tune to the BBC television series Screen Test.

Then Dale met Robin Phillips of the KPM Music Recorded Library at his office in 21 Denmark Street, and began contributing to KPM's 1000 Series of library records, such as KPM 1002 The Sounds of Syd Dale (1966). Others with major Syd Dale contributions included KPM 1017 Impact and Action, and KPM 1018 Tension and Suspense, which both proved popular in the United States and Australian markets. KPM soon became part of the international EMI Group, and Dale was asked by EMI's Capitol Records in the US to arrange and conduct an album of music from the TV shows Bonanza and The High Chaparral.

In 1971, he founded his own Amphonic Music company and record label for the express purpose of recording and producing his compositions and supplying library and production music to the television, film and radio business. Initially it operated from 8- Mortimer Street, close to the BBC, but later moved into a Surrey mansion, Kerchesters, Waterhouse Lane in Kingswood. The first Amphonic album was Big Band Sounds of Today (AMPS 101), including music by Brian Fahey, James Clarke, Malcolm Lockyer, Dick Walter, Ronnie Hazlehurst and Ronnie Aldrich. Other Amphonic LPs, including compositions by Dale include AMPS 113 Melody all the Way (1975, credited as the Concert Pop Orchestra), AMPS 114 Sounds 80 (1975), and AMPS 120 Where the Action Is (1977).

== Compositions and arrangements ==
Among Syd Dale's many production music pieces, the bongo drum and harpsichord-driven "Cuban Presto" (originally released on the 1966 KPM album Accent on Percussion), was used by WPIX (Channel 11) in New York City as the theme for its late-night movie show, The Channel 11 Film Festival, from the late 1960s to the 1980s.

In 1967, he created a piece entitled "Walk and Talk," which was used for many years on BBC2 as the countdown music before television transmitter information bulletins were read over the air. It also appeared in the 1967 ABC television animated series Spider-Man along with many other Dale library tracks. His "C'mon In" (released as a Decca single in its own right) was the signature tune to BBC Radio 2's Breakfast Special in the late sixties.

Another production piece, "Here in a Smoky Room," composed by Brian Fahey and performed by Dale as the Otto Keller Band on AMPS 101, was broadcast multiple times on BBC test card transmission music soundtracks in the early 1970s.

In 1973, under the pseudonym Dali Caldis, Dale released a big band swing jazz Christmas album entitled Sounds for a Swinging Christmas on the Chevron label.

== Legacy ==
In the early 1990s, Meryn Cadell sampled "Walk and Talk" for the spoken word monologue "The Sweater," which was used by skater Josée Chouinard in one of her award-winning routines. The rapper Eazy-E also sampled the track for his performance in "Gimme Datt Nutt."

His music is still used in productions today. For example, his "Beauty Parade" was used in the SpongeBob SquarePants episode "Spy Buddies", and in The IT Crowd episode "Men Without Women." In an episode of Scottish comedy Still Game, his song "Bill Sykes can be heard. And in the television comedy series Episodes, Matt LeBlanc uses the tune "Two Time" as his iPhone's ringtone. The composition known either as "Man Friday" or "The Penthouse Suite" (from KPM 1049 Chorus and Orchestra, 1969), was used as the theme tune to LWT's Tarrant on TV and was also used extensively in the episode "Speed 3" of Father Ted to introduce libidinous milkman Pat Mustard.

Dale's tracks have been widely used by NFL Films over some four decades; his track "Artful Dodger" is given prominent use in such films as the official film recapping Super Bowl V.

== Discography ==
The following list is only a small sample of his work.

=== LPs ===
- The Sounds of Syd Dale, KPM 1002 (1966)
- Impact and Action KPM 1017 (1967)
- Flamboyant Themes - Vol. II, KPM 1038 (1968)
- Chorus and Orchestra (1969)
- Impact & Action - Vol. 2 (1970)
- Music from Bonanza and The High Chaparral (1970)
- Big Band Sounds Of Today (as the Otto Keller Band), Amphonic AMPS 101 (1971)
- Love Isn't Just For The Young Various Volumes
- Sounds for a Swinging Christmas (as the Dali Caldis Ensemble)

=== Post-mortem compilations ===
- Syd Dale: Retro
- Kitsch UK
- Cinemaphonic Soul Punch
- Swinging 60's
- Cocktail Lounge
- Dusty Fingers Volume 13
- Kpm 1000 Series: On The Lighter Side
