= Lou Preager =

British dance band leader (1906–1978)

- Born: Louis Jacob Preager; 12 January 1906; Poplar, London, England
- Died: 14 November 1978 (aged 72) Mallorca, Spain
- Genres: Jazz
- Occupation(s): Musician; Dance band leader Disc jockey Businessman
- Instrument: Piano
- Years active: 1925-1962 (retired)

Louis Jacob Preager (12 January 1906 – 14 November 1978), known as Lou Preager, was an English pianist, dance band leader, disc jockey and businessman. He was active from the 1930s to the 1950s; with his band he made many recordings. They also appeared on radio and television.

== Early career ==
Louis Jacob Preager was born in Poplar, London, in 1906, and came from a Jewish background. He was the son of Louis Preager, a tailor, and his wife Rebecca (née Cohen De Murcia). While at school, the younger Louis he played the piano in dance bands, and from age 19 he was a full-time musician. He played in fashionable London clubs and restaurants; in 1931 he joined Eugene Pini and his Tango Orchestra at the Monseigneur, and later joined the Billy Reid Accordion Band. In 1933, Preager led an 11-piece band, playing at Ciro's and later at Romano's in the Strand. His first recordings were released in 1935.

== Second World War and later ==
Preager joined the Intelligence Corps in 1941. His right arm was seriously injured in a motor accident, and he received hospital treatment for eight months.

He was invalided out of the army in 1942, and he formed a 14-piece orchestra to play at the Hammersmith Palais in London; it was the resident band there for 18 years. It made frequent radio broadcasts, including, from 1942, 96 editions of Music While You Work. The band later appeared on television. A number of vocalists sang with the band, including Paul Rich, Edna Kaye, Rita Williams and Elisabeth Welch.

Preager's radio broadcasts, Write a Tune for £1000, a songwriting contest broadcast in 1945, 1947 and 1950, were very popular, and produced the hit song "Cruising Down the River". During the 1950s, Preager presented Housewives' Choice on the BBC Light Programme and, at the time was a well-known disc jockey. In 1959, his orchestra moved to the Lyceum Ballroom, where he was often seen in the TV programme Come Dancing.

== Awards, recordings and other interests ==
During his career he made recordings for Regal Zonophone Records and the Columbia Graphophone Company. He won three Carl Alan Awards for the best Palais Band.

Preager had several business interests. He was owner of a book publishing company, founder of a record company, and also had interests in film and television.

== Personal life and death ==
In 1958, Preager married Rose Sharp in Marylebone, where the couple lived.

From the 1960s, Preager suffered from persistent ill health and retired from music, aged 56, in 1962. He moved to Slough and bought the Carlton Ballroom in the town; it was sold after he suffered a heart attack in 1967. He died on 14 November 1978 in Mallorca, aged 72.
