= Halfway to Heaven (Harry Chapin song) =

1974 song by Harry Chapin

"Halfway to Heaven" is a song written and performed by Harry Chapin. The song was included, but not released as a single, on his 1974 album, Verities and Balderdash. The song is based on a true conversation he had while at a train station about sexual morality.

Professional ratings
Review scores
Source	Rating
Swiss Charts	5/5 stars

== Background ==
The song was inspired when Harry arrived at a train station and his wife, Sandra Chapin, was late picking him up. He started talking with a man who, as the conversation continued, started confiding in him about his personal life. The conversation was about sexual morality and how getting older, and seeing new generations of women, changes how a person was raised on sexual beliefs. And that the world is accepting, what it once would not allow.

== Highway To Heaven ==
Highway To Heaven is an unreleased version of the song. It was removed from the album, Sniper and Other Love Songs. The two songs have many differences between them, such as lyrical changes and some background vocal being sung in bass. The song was released in a 2004 double album with Sniper and Other Love Songs and Heads & Tales, but only to Europe. It included a total of 8 unreleased tracks (1 from Heads & Tales and 7 from Sniper and Other Love Songs).
