= Ken Barrie =

English voice actor and singer (1933–2016)

- Born: Leslie Hulme; 9 January 1933; Tunstall, Stoke-on-Trent, Staffordshire, England
- Died: 29 July 2016 (aged 83); Denham, Buckinghamshire, England
- Other name: Les Carle
- Occupations: Voice actor, singer
- Years active: 1955–2016
- Spouse: Doreen Pye (m. 1954; died 2009)
- Children: 2

Leslie Hulme (9 January 1933 – 29 July 2016), known professionally as Ken Barrie, was an English voice actor and singer. He was best known for voicing the titular character and several other characters in the children's television series Postman Pat, as well as singing the theme tune. He also sang the theme tune of the BBC Television programme Charlie Chalk.

== Biography ==
Barrie was born on 9 January 1933 in Tunstall, Stoke-on-Trent, Staffordshire. Under the stage name Les Carle, he recorded for Embassy Records, an offshoot of Woolworths that released inexpensive cover versions of pop hits, between 1962 and 1965. He changed his stage name when a friend told him it was French for "the Charlies", and took his new name of Ken Barrie from the names of his wife's brothers.

His singing and narrating voice and whistling was heard in many movies and television commercials. Barrie provided singing voices in feature films for many actors, including George C. Scott, in Jane Eyre (1970), Horst Buchholz in The Great Waltz (1972), and Larry Hagman in Applause (1973).

He became the voice of the children's television show Postman Pat in 1981, narrating the first and second series and also providing the voices of the characters Postman Pat, Ted Glen, Granny Dryden, Peter Fogg, Major Forbes, George Lancaster, Jeff Pringle, Alf Thompson, Reverend Peter Timms, P.C. Arthur Selby, and Sam Waldron. He retired from voicing Pat in 2008 when the series was revamped as Postman Pat Special Delivery Service, though stayed on as the voice of Ted, Alf, P.C. Selby and Reverend Timms for the show's first series (sixth series overall) before leaving the show completely in 2013. A single of the theme song, credited to Barrie, reached number 44 on the UK singles chart in 1982, and re entered the chart the following year.

He sang the soundtrack for the television show Charlie Chalk and recorded the soundtracks for the films Sharks' Treasure (1975), Emily (1976) and Silent Scream (1979). He also whistled the tune for the theme song of the 1987 BBC series My Family and Other Animals, based on the book by Gerald Durrell, and sang the theme song to the hit long running BBC sitcom Hi-de-Hi!.

== Personal life ==
Barrie was married to Doreen Pye from 1954 until her death in 2009. He also had two children, a son named Paul Hulme and a daughter named Lorraine Hulme Peterson. Barrie's son Paul Hulme was a music engineer who went on to work for the music departments for many films, although Hulme died in a road accident in 1998 at the age of 38.

== Death ==
Barrie died at his home in Denham, Buckinghamshire, on 29 July 2016 from liver cancer. He is survived by his daughter Lorraine Hulme Peterson.

== Filmography ==
=== Film ===
Year	Title	Role	Notes
1970	Jane Eyre	Edward Rochester (Singing voice)	
1972	The Great Waltz	Johann Strauss, Jr. (Singing voice)	Uncredited
1973	Applause	Bill Sampson (Singing voice)	Uncredited
1979	Ray Charles' World of Music	Singer	
1986	Christmas Eve With Val Doonican	Unknown	
1990	Postman Pat's ABC	Narrator (voice)	
1990	Postman Pat's 123	Narrator (voice)	
1994	Read Along with Postman Pat	Narrator (voice)	
1998	BBC Future Generations	Postman Pat (voice)	
1999	Calling All Toddlers	Narrator (segment: Postman Pat: Postman Pat and the Hole in the Road)	
2002	Calling All Toddlers 2	Narrator (segment: Postman Pat: Postman Pat has the Best Village)	
2003	Postman Pat's Magic Christmas	Postman Pat, Ten Glen, Reverend Timms, Mr. Pringle, Santa Clause (voice)	
2004	Postman Pat's Pirate Treasure	Postman Pat, Ted Glen, Alf Thompson, PC Selby, Reverend Timms, Matt Clifton (voice)	
2006	Making Children Smile	(voice)	
2009	The Official BBC Children in Need Medley	Ted Glen (voice)	

=== Television ===
Year	Title	Role	Notes
1976	Centre Play	Singer	1 episode
1980-1988	Hi-de-Hi!	Opening and closing theme song singing voice	58 episodes
1981-2008	Postman Pat	Narrator, Postman Pat, Ted Glen, Alf Thompson, PC Selby, Reverend Timms, Mr. Pringle, Granny Dryden, Peter Fogg, Major Forbes, George Lancaster, Matt Clifton, Sam Waldron, Santa Claus, The Train Inspector (voice)	144 episodes
1988-1989	Charlie Chalk	Song vocals (voice)	13 episodes

=== Video games ===
Year	Title	Role	Notes
2007	Postman Pat and the Greendale Rocket	Postman Pat (voice)	
