= Dennis Hale (vocalist) =

English singer (1922–1960)

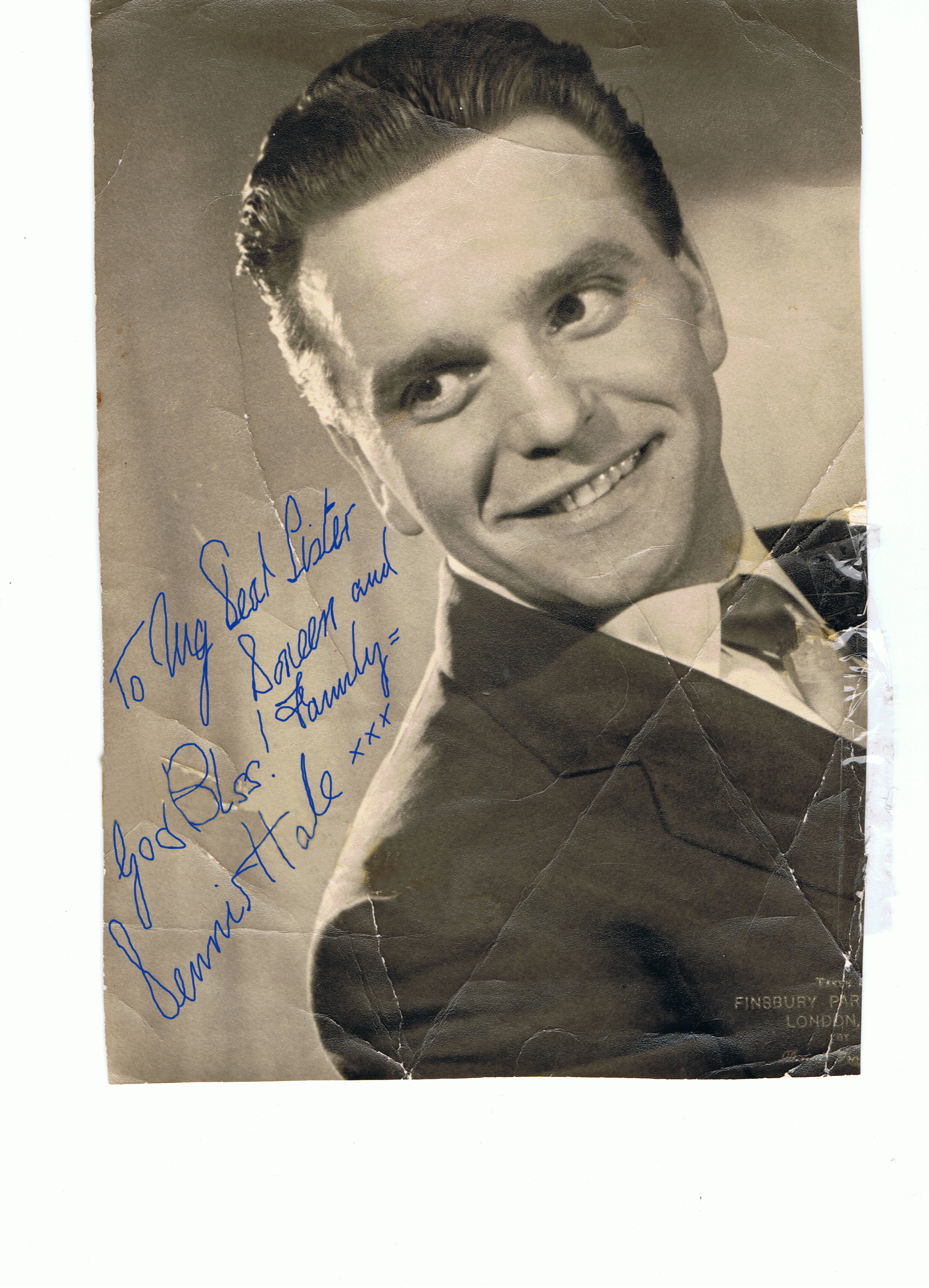
- Photo sent by Dennis to his sister

Background information
- Born: Dennis Godfrey Hoare; 24 May 1922; Uckfield, Sussex, England
- Died: 10 September 1960 (aged 38) Kitwe, Northern Rhodesia
- Genres: Big band
- Years active: c.1945 – 1960
- Labels: Parlophone, Decca Records

Dennis Hale (born Dennis Godfrey Hoare; 24 May 1922 – 10 September 1960) was a British vocalist with a number of bands and performers, including the Oscar Rabin Band, Jack Parnell, Johnny Douglas, Teddy Foster (1945 to 1946), and Eric Winstone (1946 to 1948).

Hale left the army in 1945, where he had been a sergeant major. At the time, he was the youngest sergeant major in the Royal Artillery. In 1948 he set up his own orchestra and had a resident berth at the Brighton Aquarium ballroom. In 1955, he changed recording label from Parlophone to Decca Records.

== Critical reception ==
Gramophone, in a review of Hale singing "Devil's Eyes" stated that it was "gorge for those who enjoy the more extravagantly passionate singers." A different reviewer for Gramophone, in a review of Hale singing "The Bandit", stated that they would "like him much better if he didn't indulge so much in tasteless exaggeration and think that everyone listened to his records about ten miles from their gramophones."

A Gramophone review of "Blowing Wild" stated that it was "more for those 'teen age maidens who swoon every time they hear a voice that has what to them is sex appeal. To me it's just rather tasteless extravagance." In 1952, Gramophone reviewed Hale's double-sided single that featured Hale singing "Anytime" and "Weaver of Dreams". For "Anytime", the reviewer stated that it was a "bouncy number" that was "more pleasant to the ear" than other vocalists had done. However, the reviewer stated that "Weaver of Dreams" had a lot of "weary notes" that sounded like he was "sing[ing] through his nose."

== Personal life ==
Hale was married to Santina Motta in 1946 and had two sons, Paul Dennis Hoare and Robert Norman Hoare (Hale).

== Recordings ==
=== Parlophone ===
- "Anytime"/"Weaver of Dreams" (March 1952)
- "Devil Eyes" (February 1954)
- "Blowing Wild" (April 1954)
- "The Bandit" (June 1954)
- "The Butterscotch Mop" (1955)

=== Decca ===
- "Chee Chee-Oo Chee (Sang the Little Bird)" (June 1955)
- "Sweet and Gentle" (July 1955)
- "Walk With Me Forever" (July 1955)
- "The Longest Walk" (October 1955)
- "Tina Marie" (October 1955)
- "It's Almost Tomorrow" (January 1956)
- "Stealin'" (January 1956)

=== Unknown ===
- "Can't I"
- "Sway"
- "Only Fools"
- "Why Don't You Believe Me?"
