= Saturday Night with Conway Twitty =

Studio album by Conway Twitty
- Released: 1959
- Genre: Rockabilly, rock and roll
- Length: 27:28
- Label: MGM

Conway Twitty chronology
Conway Twitty Sings (1958)	Saturday Night with Conway Twitty (1959)	Lonely Blue Boy (1960)

Saturday Night with Conway Twitty is the second studio album by Conway Twitty, released in 1959.

== Track listing ==
No.	Title	Writer(s)	Length
1.	"Danny Boy"	Frederick Edward Weatherly	2:47
2.	"Heavenly"	Jack Nance, Conway Twitty	2:30
3.	"She’s Mine"	Nance, Twitty	1:50
4.	"Blueberry Hill"	Al Lewis, Vincent Rose, Lawrence Stock	2:37
5.	"Hey Little Lucy (Don’t Cha Put No Lipstick On)"	Aaron H. Schroeder, Sharon Silbert, George Weiss	1:47
6.	"Halfway to Heaven"	Martin Kalmanoff, Schroeder	2:16
7.	"Hey Miss Ruby"	Nance, Twitty	2:26
8.	"You Win Again"	Hank Williams	2:18
9.	"Restless"	Milton Addington	2:18
10.	"Beach Comber"	Chip Hardy	1:49
11.	"Judge of Hearts"	Nance, Twitty	2:24
12.	"Goin’ Home"	Nance, Twitty	2:11
