= Brian Fahey (composer) =

- Born: 25 April 1919; Margate, Kent, England
- Died: 4 April 2007 (aged 87) Worthing, West Sussex, England
- Genres: Easy listening Jazz; Big band Classical
- Occupation(s): Composer; Arranger; Conductor; Bandleader
- Years active: 1938–1999
- Formerly of: The Brian Fahey Orchestra, BBC Big Band, BBC Scottish Radio Orchestra, Shirley Bassey

Brian Michael Fahey (25 April 1919 – 4 April 2007) was a British musical director, composer and arranger, best known for composing "At the Sign of the Swingin' Cymbal", the signature tune to BBC Radio's long running programme Pick of the Pops. From 1972 he was principal conductor of the BBC Scottish Radio Orchestra, until it was disbanded in 1981.

== Biography ==
Fahey was born in Margate, Kent, England, and educated at Colfe's Grammar School. He learned piano and cello from his father, and became interested in big band arranging and composing. During the Second World War he served in the Royal Artillery;. Wounded in the leg during the Dunkirk retreat, he was taken prisoner. He was shot during the Wormhoudt massacre on 28 May 1940. After recovering from his wounds and the removal of a lung, he spent five years in prisoner-of-war camps, during which time he worked on his musical skills.

After the war, Fahey became a pianist with the Rudy Starita Band which, supported by ENSA, toured Egypt and Palestine. During that tour he met the band singer Audrey Laurie (birth name Audrey Watkins). They married in 1947. After that he played in various bands, but his passion was for arranging. Between 1949 and 1959, he worked for the music publishers Chappells and Cinephonic Music, specialising in arrangements for singers, bands and orchestras, mainly for radio broadcasts. His compositions include "The Creep" (with Ken Mackintosh), which reached No. 10 in the UK Singles Chart in January 1954, "Fanfare Boogie" (1955, written with Max Kaye for the Eric Winstone Band), which won an Ivor Novello Award, and "Here in a Smoky Room", which (as played by the Otto Keller Band – O.K. being a pseudonym for Syd Dale) was one of the staples of BBC test card transmission music in the early 1970s.

Fahey freelanced after 1959, working with recording companies, the BBC and in the theatre. His most famous piece, "At the Sign of the Swingin' Cymbal", was first released in September 1960 under the name Brian Fahey and his Orchestra. It was used as the theme tune for Pick of the Pops from 1961 to 1966, and again from 1970 until the present day.

He provided scores for films such as The Break (1963), Curse of Simba (1965), The Plank (1967) and Rhubarb (1969), and the theme to Pete Murray's popular BBC Radio 2 show Open House. Between 1967 and 1972, he was Shirley Bassey's musical director. In 1972, he became principal conductor of the BBC Scottish Radio Orchestra. Under his direction the orchestra did a lot of television work, accompanying Kenneth McKellar, Lena Martell, Moira Anderson, Shirley Bassey, Lulu, Lena Zavaroni and Anne Lorne Gillies. It also had its own BBC One programme, Make Way for Music. They recorded 'inserts' for the many music and chat shows on BBC Radio 2 and Radio Scotland, recording with artists including Cleo Laine, Georgie Fame, Carol Kidd and trombonist Don Lusher. Fahey continued to work for the BBC after the orchestra was disbanded in 1981.

== Personal life and death ==
Fahey was a close friend of Ella Fitzgerald (with whom he shared the same birthday) and of the American arrangers Billy May and Nelson Riddle, who both attempted to persuade him to emigrate to the US, where he was offered several lucrative contracts. But he preferred not to disrupt his family life and so instead lived for many years in Purley, Surrey. In 1972, he moved to the Ayrshire village of Skelmorlie on the west coast of Scotland, where he and his wife Audrey remained until her death in November 2006. He was an avid cricket and football fan and supported Arsenal. He died on 4 April 2007 at Worthing Hospital, aged 87, and was survived by his six children, 13 grandchildren and three great-grandchildren.
