= Ray Pilgrim =

British singer (born 1936)

- Also known as: Bobby Stevens
- Born: Ray Pilgrim; 1936 (age 89–90)
- Origin: London, England
- Genres: Pop
- Occupations: Singer, songwriter, record producer, musician
- Years active: Mainly 1960–1965
- Labels: Embassy (main), Oriole, Pye, Top Rank, WRC, Redrock
- Website: Raypilgrim.co.uk

Ray Pilgrim (born 1936), also known as Bobby Stevens, was one of the most prolific big band singers, radio broadcasters, recording and session singers in Britain in the late 1950s and early 1960s.

== Biography ==
=== Music career ===
Pilgrim recorded mainly for the UK's Embassy Records under the Ray Pilgrim name and also made nearly 150 cover records for the Embassy Records label, in addition to Ray Pilgrim using the name Bobby Stevens (particularly in earlier 1960–1962 releases). In later releases he used the names The Typhoons, The Starlings, The Jaybirds and the Beatmen. He was the lead vocalist in the Typhoons alongside Mike Redway, and the lead vocalist in the Starlings alongside Joan Baxter.

His recordings under various names were released on over 30 different labels in over 20 different countries, with aggregate sales estimated at around five million. He also recorded TV jingles, demos, and film soundtracks.

Pilgrim did not regard singing as a long-term career, and said he only became a professional singer to enable him to give up his job at a bank, in order to go to university and get a degree at the London School of Economics. He sang with the Oscar Rabin Orchestra and was featured for over 190 consecutive weeks singing live on the popular BBC radio programme Go Man Go. He was also a guest on other shows such as the BBC's Saturday Club and ITV's Cool for Cats.

Pilgrim, although concentrating on singing cover versions of many famous songs, wrote a few original songs, including "Baby Doll", "Little Miss Make Believe" and "Love Is Blind" which he recorded himself for Oriole. His songs were also interpreted by other artists. "Little Christine" was a successful hit for Dick Jordan, Burt Blanca and Danny Fisher, "Just One More Dance" was recorded by Lee Curtis, and "Big Boy" – an English version of the Norwegian Eurovision Song Contest song "Voi Voi" – was performed and recorded by Nora Brockstedt.

=== Professional career ===
Eventually, Pilgrim gave up singing after he gained his degree and made a successful career in information technology. However, he briefly came out of "retirement" to record his last session in April 1966, singing the theme song for the film Carry On Screaming!.

== Discography ==
=== Compositions ===
- 1960: "Little Christine" (sung by Dick Jordan)
- 1960: "Big Boy" (English lyrics to Norway's Eurovision song "Voi Voi" – sung by Nora Brockstedt)
- 1960: "Tell me No Lies" (English lyrics to a song sung by Nora Brockstedt)
- 1960: "Baby Doll" (co-wrote)
- 1961: "Little Miss Make Believe" (wrote)
- 1961: "Love Is Blind" (wrote)
- 1961: "Bobby Bingo" (co-wrote – sung by the Bingo Boys)
- 1963: "Just One More Dance" (wrote – sung by Lee Curtis and by Dave Duggan)

=== Singles ===
1960

- "Fall in Love with You" / "Wild One" (as Bobby Stevens)
- "Clementine" / "Stuck on You" (as Bobby Stevens)
- "Cradle of Love" / "Heart of a Teenage Girl" (as Bobby Stevens)
- "Baby Doll" / "Gambler's Guitar" (as Ray Pilgrim)
- "Shakin' All Over" / "Angela Jones" (as Bobby Stevens)
- "Tie Me Kangaroo Down" / "A Mess of Blues" (as Bobby Stevens)
- "I Love You" / "Strawberry Fair" (as Bobby Stevens)
- "Lively" / "Lonely Pup" (as Bobby Stevens)

1961

- "Counting Teardrops" / "Sway" (as Bobby Stevens)
- "Rubber Ball" / "You're Sixteen" (as Bobby Stevens)
- On album Back to the Twenties:
  - "That's my Weakness Now" (Bobby Stevens/Don Duke and Dick Jordan)
  - "Here Am I, Broken Hearted" (as Bobby Stevens)
  - "If I Had a Talking Picture" (as Bobby Stevens)
  - "When the Red Red Robin" (Bobby Stevens/Don Duke and Dick Jordan)
- "Who Am I?" / "Wooden Heart" (as Bobby Stevens)
- "Are You Sure?" (Don Duke/Bobby Stevens and Dick Jordan)
- "Granada" / "Little Miss Make Believe" (as Ray Pilgrim)
- "Love Is Blind" (Ray Pilgrim/Dick Jordan)
- Blue Moon" / "Warpaint" (first as Bobby Stevens, second as Duke/Stevens and Dick Jordan)
- "More Than I Can Say" / "Hello Mary Lou" (first as Duke/Stevens. second as Bobby Stevens and Dick Jordan)
- "Mother-in-Law" / "But I Do" (as Bobby Stevens)
- "Halfway to Paradise" / "A Girl Like You" (as Bobby Stevens)
- "Johnny Remember Me" / "Time" (as Bobby Stevens)
- "That's My Home" (as Happy Knights)
- "Michael Row the Boat Ashore" / "Who Put the Bomp (in the Bomp)" (as Bobby Stevens)
- "His Latest Flame" / "Big Bad John" (as Bobby Stevens)
- "Take Good Care of My Baby" (as Bobby Stevens)

1962

- "Multiplication" / "The Young Ones" (as Bobby Stevens)
- "The Lion Sleeps Tonight" / "The Language of Love" (as Bobby Stevens)
- "Red Red Roses" / "There's Always Me" (as Ray Pilgrim)
- "Forget-Me-Not" / "Lonesome" (as Bobby Stevens)
- "Peppermint Twist" / "Crying in the Rain" (first as Bobby Stevens, second as Bobby Stevens/Redd Wayne and Mike Redway)
- "Wimoweh" / "Can't Help Falling in Love" (as Bobby Stevens)
- "Never Goodbye" (as Bobby Stevens)
- "Good Luck Charm" / "I'm Looking out the Window" (as Bobby Stevens)
- "Come Outside" / "Ginny Come Lately" (first as Bobby Stevens/Barbara Kay, second Bobby Stevens)
- "I Remember You" / Follow That Dream" (as Bob Stevens)
- "Breaking Up Is Hard to Do" / Sealed with a Kiss" (both as Ray Pilgrim/Redway)
- "Lovesick Blues" / "Let's Dance" (as Ray Pilgrim)
- "No One Can Make My Sunshine Smile" (Ray Pilgrim/Redway)
- "Return to Sender" / "It Only Took a Minute" (as Ray Pilgrim)
- "Baby Take a Bow" / "Bachelor Boy" (as Ray Pilgrim)

1963

- "Please, Please Me" (as The Typhoons being Ray Pilgrim and Mike Redway)
- "Some Kinda Fun" / "Walk Right In" (first as Ray Pilgrim, second as backing vocals to Barbara Kay)
- "Charmaine" / "Rhythm of the Rain" (as The Typhoons)
- "Walk Like a Man" (as The Starlings being Ray Pilgrim and Joan Baxter)
- "How Do You Do It" (as Bobby Stevens)
- "Can't Get Used to Losing You" (Les Carle, with Ray Pilgrim backing Ken)
- "Brown Eyed Handsome Man" / "From Me to You" (first as Ray Pilgrim, second as The Typhoons being Ray Pilgrim and Mike Redway)
- "I Like It" / "Falling" (as Ray Pilgrim)
- "Confessin' (That I Love You)" (as Ray Pilgrim)
- "Forget Him" (as Ray Pilgrim)
- "Twist and Shout" / "Bobby Tomorrow" (as Ray Pilgrim)
- "I'm Telling You Now" (as Ray Pilgrim)
- "Do You Love Me" / "If I Had a Hammer" (as Ray Pilgrim)
- "Wishing" (as Ray Pilgrim)
- "Mule Train" (as Ray Pilgrim)
- "You'll Never Walk Alone" / "Ain't Gonna Kiss Ya" (first as Ray Pilgrim, second as The Starlings being Ray Pilgrim and Joan Baxter)
- "You Were Made for Me" / "Sue's Gotta Be Mine" (as Ray Pilgrim)
- "This Boy" / "I Want to Hold Your Hand" (The Typhoons being Ray Pilgrim and Mike Redway)
- "I Can Dance" / "Swinging on a Star" (first as Ray Pilgrim, second as Pilgrim and Jeanette Michel)

1964

- "Hippy Hippy Shake" (The Typhoons)
- "Needles and Pins" / "Stay" (The Typhoons being Ray Pilgrim, Ken and Joan)
- "Don't Blame Me" (as Ray Pilgrim)
- "5-4-3-2-1" / "I'm in Love" (first as Ray Pilgrim, second as The Typhoons)
- "Bits and Pieces" / "Candy Man" (The Typhoons)
- "All My Loving" (The Typhoons)
- "Borne on the Wind" (The Typhoons)
- "Over You" / "Not Fade Away" (The Jaybirds)
- "Tell Me When" / "You Can't Do That" (The Jaybirds)
- "Can't Buy Me Love" (The Jaybirds)
- "Baby Let Me Take You Home" (The Jaybirds)
- "Hold Me" / "You're No Good" (first as Ray Pilgrim, second as The Typhoons)
- A Hard Day's Night (EP by The Typhoons being Ray Pilgrim and Mike Redway)
  - "A Hard Day's Night"
  - "And I Love Her"
  - "I Should Have Known Better"
  - "Tell Me Why"
- "Kissin' Cousins" (as Ray Pilgrim)
- "Tobacco Road" / "Do Wah Diddy Diddy" (The Typhoons)
- "Have I the Right" / "Such a Night" (as Ray Pilgrim)
- "Together" / "I'm Crying" (The Typhoons)
- "Sha-la-la" / One Way Love" (The Typhoons)
- "Um, Um, Um, Um, Um, Um" / "He's in Town" (The Typhoons)
- "Somewhere" / Yeh, Yeh" (as Ray Pilgrim)

1965

- "I Apologize" (as Ray Pilgrim)
- "The Game of Love" (The Typhoons)
- "It's Not Unusual" / "Don't Let Me Be Misunderstood" (The Typhoons)
- "Tossing & Turning" / "Heart Full of Soul" (first as The Starlings, the second as The Typhoons)
- "Wooly Bully" / "Help!" (first as Ray Pilgrim, second as The Typhoons)

2010

- "The Long and Winding Road" / "In My Life" (both as Ray Pilgrim/Mike Redway)

== In compilations ==
- 1961: Best of the Bunch (LP – 1 Ray Pilgrim track)
- 1961: Tribute to Elvis (LP – 3 Ray Pilgrim tracks)
- 1961: Tribute to Cliff (LP – 4 Ray Pilgrim tracks)
- 1962: Twist (EP – 1 Ray Pilgrim track)
- 1962: Summer Holiday (EP compilation – 1 Ray Pilgrim track)
- 1962: Jukebox Favourites No. 4 (EP compilation – 2 Ray Pilgrim tracks)
- 1962: Jukebox Favourites (LP compilation – 4 Ray Pilgrim tracks)
- 1963: Jukebox Favourites No. 6 (EP compilation – 3 Ray Pilgrim tracks)
- 1963: Liverpool Beat Compilation (4 Ray Pilgrim tracks)
- 1963: Jukebox Favourites No. 7 (EP compilation – 3 Ray Pilgrim tracks)
- 1963: Teenage Beat (LP compilation – 3 Ray Pilgrim tracks)
- 1963: Jukebox Favourites (LP compilation – 5 Ray Pilgrim tracks)
- 1963: Best of the Bunch (LP compilation – 1 Ray Pilgrim track)
- 1964: Jukebox Favourites No. 8 (EP compilation – 1 Ray Pilgrim track)
- 1964: Liverpool Beat (LP compilation of 8 Ray Pilgrim tracks)
- 1964: 3 Big Beat Films (LP compilation – 5 Ray Pilgrim tracks)
- 1964: Fourteen Top Pops (LP compilation – 2 Ray Pilgrim tracks)

== In backing vocals ==
- 1964: Group 64 (LP – WRC recordings) with Ray Pilgrim as backing vocals to Group X in):
  - "Hard Day's Night"
  - "Needles and Pins"
  - "It's All Over Now"
  - "She Loves You"
  - "I'll Cry Instead"
