= Pick of the Pops =

UK radio programme

- Genre: Music
- Running time: 120 minutes (17:00–19:00)
- Country of origin: United Kingdom
- Language: English
- Home station: BBC Light Programme (1955–1967); BBC Radio 1 (1967–1972, 1989–1992); Capital (1982–1988); Capital Gold (1994–1997); BBC Radio 2 (1997–present)
- Hosted by: Franklin Engelmann (1955); Alan Dell (1956, 1957–1958); David Jacobs (1956–1957, 1958–1961, 1962); Don Moss (1963); Alan Freeman (1961–1962, 1963, 1964–2000); Dale Winton (2000–2010); Tony Blackburn (2010–2016); Mark Goodier (2016, 2018, 2024–present); Paul Gambaccini (2016–2023); Steve Wright (2023–2024); Gary Davies (2024)
- Produced by: Sarah Harrison (2024–present); Heather Wall (2018–2020); Tom Du Croz (2015–2018, 2020–2024); Kellie White (2020); Phil "The Collector" Swern (1989–1992, 1997–2023)
- Executive producer: Sarah Harrison (2024–present); Tom Du Croz (2015–2018, 2020–2024); Richard Power (2018–2019)
- Recording studio: Broadcasting House, London; (1955–1972, 1989–1992, 1997–2006, 2024–present); Wogan House, London (2006–2024); Maida Vale Studios (2023–24)
- Original release: 4 October 1955 – present
- Audio format: Stereophonic
- Opening theme: "At the Sign of the Swingin' Cymbal" by Brass Incorporated
- Website: www.bbc.co.uk/programmes/b006wqx7

Pick of the Pops is a long-running BBC Radio programme; it was based originally on the Top 20 from the UK singles chart and was first broadcast on the BBC Light Programme on 4 October 1955. It transferred to BBC Radio 1 (simulcast with Radio 2) from 1967 to 1972. The show returned to the BBC in 1989 and its current production run started on BBC Radio 2 in 1997.

Its longest-serving presenter was Alan Freeman for almost 40 years, on and off, from 1961 to 2000. The current host is Mark Goodier, following the death of Steve Wright in 2024.

== Original format (1955–72) ==
The format was first tried out as a slot within Trad Tavern, a trad-jazz show broadcast from Aeolian Hall. The first Pick of the Pops shows, hosted by Franklin Engelmann from October 1955, did not feature chart music, but in September 1957, Alan Dell introduced the format of running through the charts of the week; he played the top tens from various music papers, plus entries to the top 20.

David Jacobs broadcast the first averaged BBC Top 20 to the helm on Saturday 29 March 1958. Alan Freeman took over in September 1961, taking the show to a regular Sunday slot in January 1962. The programme ended in September 1972, while the Top 20 continued as part of Solid Gold Sixty.

Freeman, who became the show's longest-serving presenter, had been a radio announcer in Melbourne, Australia. He arrived in Britain in 1957 and joined the Light Programme in 1960 to present Records Around Five. That same year, he replaced David Jacobs as presenter of Pick of the Pops, which was then part of a Saturday evening programme called Trad Tavern, named after traditional jazz, which had a following at the time. Pick of the Pops became a separate programme in January 1962; it was produced by Derek Chinnery.

Denys Jones (producer 1961–72) and Freeman split the programme into four sections: chart newcomers, new releases, LPs and the Top 10. The programme attracted large audiences, as the BBC had "needle time" restrictions and could play relatively few commercially available recordings each week. Freeman continued with the show when it moved to Radio 1 and stayed until the programme ended on 24 September 1972.

== Revivals ==
Freeman revived Pick of the Pops on London station Capital Radio in 1982. This format was broadcast until 1988, as Pick of the Pops – Take Two, combining the new chart (Top 15s compiled successively by Record Business, the NME and MRIB) with a chart from the past. In 1989, Freeman returned to Radio 1 where the show featured three past charts each week; it was produced by Phil Swern until March 1992 and by Sue Foster for the rest of 1992. Freeman stood down from the programme in 1992, after stating then that he would not present the show again and signed off with The Beatles' "The End".

However, Freeman revived the show on Capital Gold in April 1994 as Pick of the Pops – Take Three.

== BBC Radio 2 era ==
=== Alan Freeman ===
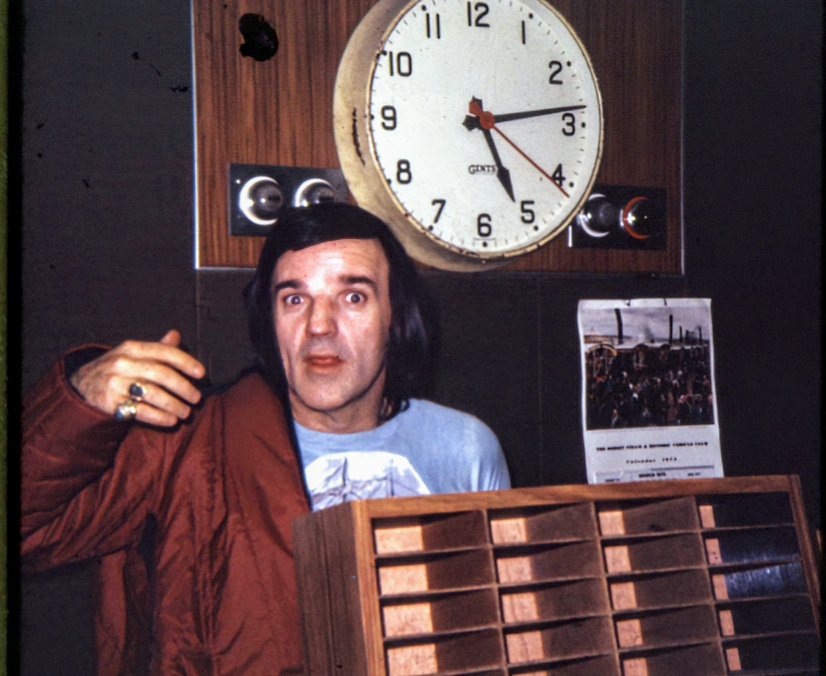
Alan Freeman at the BBC (1973)

Pick of the Pops returned to the BBC as an independent production by Unique Broadcasting on BBC Radio 2 on 5 April 1997, with Freeman now counting down two archive charts each Saturday afternoon, featuring the top 10s and interspersing trivia about the records, again researched by producer Swern. Freeman featured the years 1956 to 1991.

=== Dale Winton ===
Due to poor health and old age, Freeman retired from radio broadcasting after presenting his last edition of the show on 1 April 2000. He was replaced by Dale Winton, until the show's original weekly run ended in August 2004. The show continued with bank holiday and Christmas specials.

Pick of the Pops then returned weekly in September 2005, on a Sunday afternoon, again presented by Winton. The BBC moved the show to a Saturday lunchtime slot in April 2009, where it remained until April 2025, when it moved back to Sundays. He featured 1957 to 1999 during his tenure.

=== Tony Blackburn ===
Tony Blackburn replaced Winton in November 2010. In 2015, Phil Swern was joined on production duties by Tom Du Croz who stayed with the show until August 2024.

Mark Goodier then covered the show on an interim basis.

=== Paul Gambaccini ===
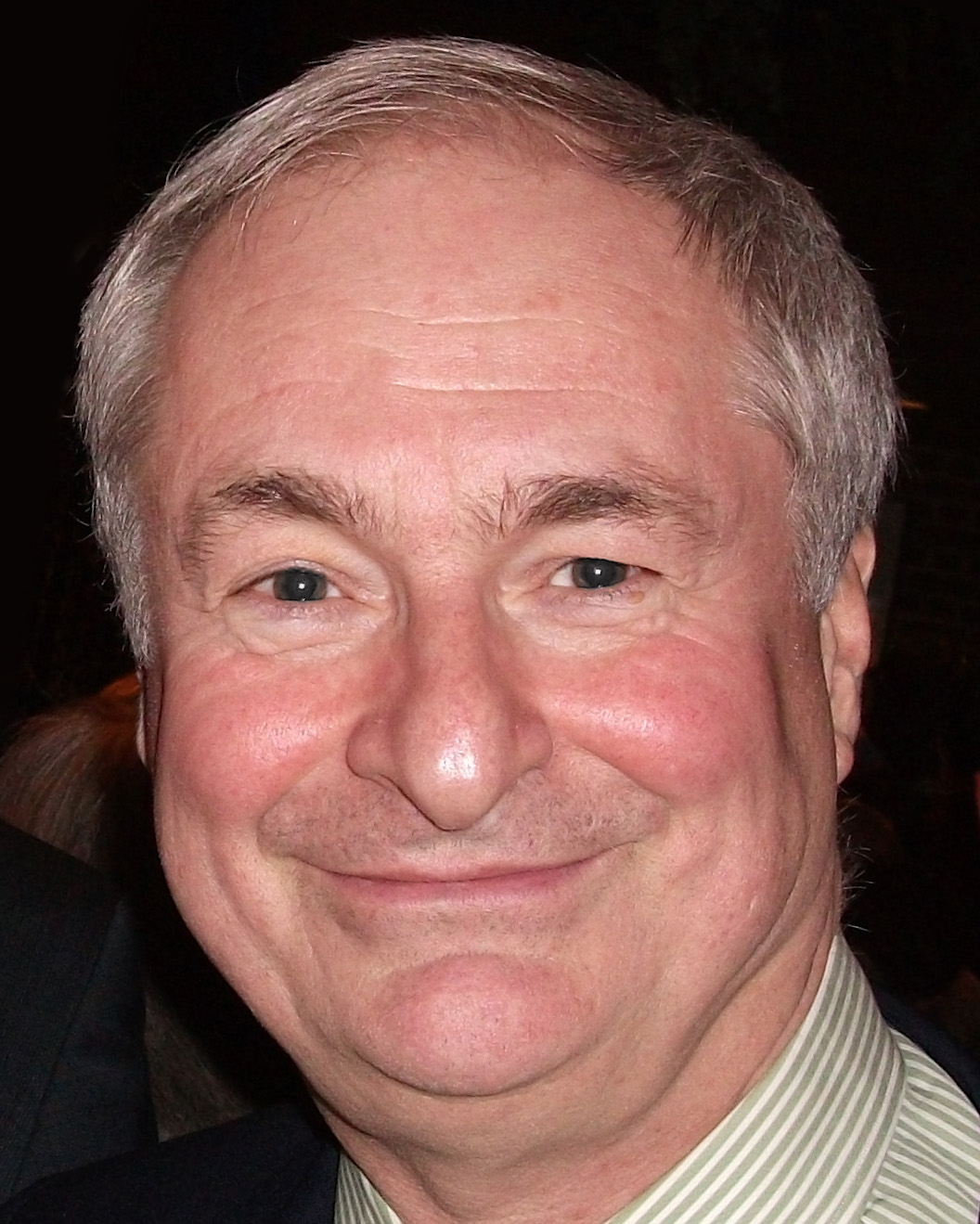
Paul Gambaccini presented the show from 2016 to 2023

Paul Gambaccini was appointed as the programme's new presenter in May 2016. He debuted on 9 July of that year, and featured the period 1958-2006 during his tenure. 1982 and 1987 featured more than 30 times during his stint and the late '90s featured more from 2018–2023.

Noel Gallagher guest-hosted the show on 29 May 2021, to mark his birthday.

Gary Davies guest-hosted the show on 21 and 28 August 2021, and 2 July 2022.

=== Steve Wright ===
Steve Wright hosted the show from October 2023 until his death in February 2024.

Gary Davies took over as an interim host in February 2024, following Wright's death.

=== Mark Goodier ===
Goodier returned to the show to take over from Wright on a permanent basis from 6 July 2024, following his decision to leave Greatest Hits Radio. Goodier's first show featured 1986 and 1998. On 18 February 2025, it was announced that the show would move back to Sundays from 5-7pm, similar to the traditional timeslot of The Official Chart, from 4 May.

After 36 years, Unique Broadcasting ended its association with Pick of the Pops and the BBC took the show's production in-house.

== Presenters ==
- Franklin Engelmann (1955)
- Alan Dell (1956 and 1957–58)
- David Jacobs (September 1956–September 1957; March 1958–September 1961; September–December 1962)
- Don Moss (September–December 1963)
- Alan Freeman (September 1961–September 1962; January-September 1963; January 1964–1 April 2000)
- Dale Winton (1 April 2000–30 October 2010)
- Tony Blackburn (6 November 2010–20 February 2016)
- Paul Gambaccini (9 July 2016–7 October 2023)
- Steve Wright (National Album Day specials, 15 October 2022; 21 October 2023–10 February 2024)
- Mark Goodier (July 2024–present).

=== Interim presenters and stand-ins ===
- Mark Goodier (interim host between Blackburn's departure and Gambaccini's arrival, 27 February 2016–2 July 2016; two shows as stand-in cover for Gambaccini in January and February 2018)
- Noel Gallagher (one show stand-in cover for Gambaccini, 29 May 2021)
- Gary Davies (three shows as stand-in cover for Gambaccini, 21 and 28 August 2021, 2 July 2022; interim host between Wright's death and Goodier's return, 17 February–29 June 2024)
- Scott Mills (one show as stand-in cover for Gambaccini, 16 April 2022).

== Theme music ==
Between 1961 and 1966, the theme tune was "At the Sign of the Swingin' Cymbal", which was written and performed by Brian Fahey and his orchestra. In 1966, it was replaced with "Quite Beside The Point" by the Harry Roberts Sound, but was reinstated in 1970 with a new recording by Brass Incorporated.
