= Oscar Rabin =

British bandleader (1899–1958)

- Born: Oscar Rabinowitz; 26 April 1899; Riga, Governorate of Livonia, Russian Empire
- Died: 20 June 1958 (aged 59) London, England
- Genres: Jazz, Dance band
- Occupations: Bandleader, Musical Director, Musician
- Instruments: Bass Saxophone, Violin
- Years active: 1914–1958
- Formerly of: Oscar Rabin Band

Oscar Rabin (26 April 1899 – 20 June 1958) was a Latvian-born English bandleader and musician. He was the musical director of his own big band.

Rabin was born in Riga to a family of Jewish origin, and came to London, England, as a child. A blind music teacher and violinist taught Rabin music in exchange for his acting as a guide. At 15 he became a professional musician; he then worked in theatre orchestras and attended the Guildhall School of Music.

His career was interrupted by service in the First World War, then in 1922 he formed an ensemble with Harry Davis. Rabin formed the Oscar Rabin Band (see main article) but was not the leader on stage as he preferred to play the bass saxophone.

He died in London aged 59. His granddaughter, Rachel Rabin, is also a musician.
