= John O'Toole (producer) =

American screenwriter and producer

John O'Toole (October 18, 1931 – March 31, 2013) was an American Emmy-nominated writer, producer, and commentator. He was the executive producer of Modern Maturity, a weekly half-hour series about aging that aired on PBS in the 1980s. He was also the screenwriter of the 1971 film Who Killed Mary What's 'Er Name?, which co-starred Sylvia Miles and Red Buttons. In his later years, he was a painter and blogger.

== Education ==
Born in Brooklyn, O'Toole attended Queens College and also had a B.F.A. from the Iowa Writers' Workshop (1953) and an M.F.A. from Columbia University (1957). He served in the United States Army from 1954 to 1956.

== Career ==
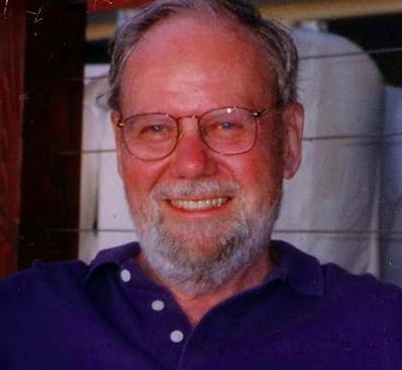

O’Toole was the CEO of the Washington, D.C. -based production company, Eli Productions, for over 20 years. He wrote and produced documentaries, TV shows, and radio series on topics that included the arts and the aging process, many of which aired on NBC, CBS, and public television and radio. His work earned him a Writers Fellowship by The National Endowment for the Arts. In 1979, he wrote a TV miniseries adaptation of James Fenimore Cooper's Leatherstocking Tales, which aired on PBS and earned an Outstanding Writer Emmy nod. He also did work for the White House Council on Aging. Eli Productions was based in Washington from 1969 until O’Toole retired in 1992. Earlier, it was based in New York.

== Film work ==
O’Toole was executive producer of the PBS television series Modern Maturity in the 1980s. The show, which was underwritten by AARP, featured Diane Rehm and was seen by an estimated 6 million viewers a week on 250-plus PBS stations. O'Toole said he found "a lot of things pitched to older people demeaning" so he created the show, which also featured Edwin Newman and Marlene Sanders.

“Aging is a lifetime process,” O’Toole said in 1988 about Modern Maturity, which was aimed at adults over 50. “You're always involved in it. As you get into it more personally, you're somebody's mother, then somebody's grandmother, and so on. We had to project an image on camera of mature adults doing things. You don't see people over 40 on commercial television – on shows that have some vitality anyway. So we set out to do that."

Before founding Eli, O’Toole wrote the film Who Killed Mary Whats'ername (1971) (Death of a Hooker). In addition to Red Buttons and Sylvia Miles, the film also features Conrad Bain (Diff'rent Strokes), Alice Playten, Sam Waterston and David Doyle (Charlie’s Angels). Ernest Pintoff was the director, and Gary McFarland wrote the soundtrack music.

In 1992, O’Toole took up painting. His paintings were exhibited at the Corcoran Gallery of Art in Washington, the Torpedo Factory Art Center in Alexandria and the Rehoboth Art League in Delaware. He began blogging at the age of 80 and wrote for the Huffington Post as well as his own blog, Eli's Observations, until his death in 2013. O'Toole married Ellie Barbo O'Toole in 1963. They have two daughters: Caitlin O'Toole, also a writer, and Sarah O'Toole Perry; and two grandchildren.
