= Al Brodax =

American animator (1926–2016)

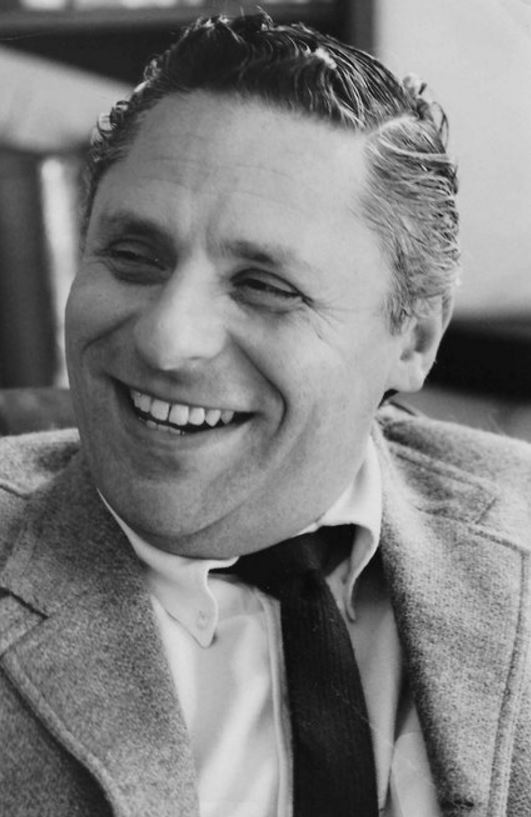
- Al in his self-described 'salad days'.
- Born: Albert Philip Brodax; February 14, 1926; Brooklyn, New York, United States
- Died: November 24, 2016 (aged 90); Danbury, Connecticut, United States
- Occupations: Film producer Television producer
- Spouse: Joan
- Children: Doug, Dan, and Jessica

Albert Philip Brodax (February 14, 1926 – November 24, 2016) was an American film and television producer known for the animated 1968 Beatles movie Yellow Submarine and credited as "Al Brodax".

== Career ==
Brodax grew up in Washington Heights, Manhattan but moved to Brooklyn as a teen and attended Midwood High School in Brooklyn, New York. He continued his education at the University of Wisconsin–Madison.

At the age of eighteen, Brodax enlisted in the U.S. Army and served in World War II. He was wounded in action, and was subsequently awarded the Purple Heart, the Combat Medical Badge, and three battle stars.

From 1950 to 1959 Brodax worked in program development for the William Morris Agency, where he helped develop Your Show of Shows, Pulitzer Prize Playhouse, and Omnibus. He joined King Features Syndicate in 1959 as the head of their then-newly created film and television development department.

After Paramount's contract to produce Popeye cartoons ran out in 1957, King Features acquired the television rights. Brodax oversaw the production of over 200 new shorts in 1960–62, with five different animation studios simultaneously involved. The rapid pace of production, coupled with limited animation due to low budgets, resulted in shorts that are held in low esteem by some Popeye fans. Brodax was also the producer of King Features' animated revival of Krazy Kat, as well as Cool McCool, Beetle Bailey, Snuffy Smith, and Casper the Friendly Ghost (1963–64 segments of The New Casper Cartoon Show).

After seeing the Beatles perform on The Ed Sullivan Show, Brodax approached the band's management with the idea of producing an animated series featuring the Fab Four. The series, of which 39 episodes were produced, premiered on September 25, 1965, on ABC. He was later involved in the production of the Beatles' animated film, Yellow Submarine, for United Artists, as producer and co-screenwriter.

From 1969 to 1980, Brodax worked as a freelance producer, writer, lyricist and director for the company Folio One Productions. He supervised animation for ABC's Make a Wish (1971–76), and Animals, Animals, Animals (1976–81).

A notable one of Brodax's projects that was eventually canceled was a spiritual successor to Yellow Submarine based of The Beatles song Strawberry Fields Forever, but was eventually canceled in 1992.

== Retirement ==
In 2004 Brodax released a memoir, Up Periscope Yellow: The Making of the Beatles' Yellow Submarine. He resided in Weston, Connecticut, where he was the head of the Brodax Film Group, a television and production company. He died on November 24, 2016.
