= Hot Dog (TV series) =

- Genre: Documentary, children
- Created by: Frank Buxton
- Country of origin: United States

Production
- Production company: Lee Mendelson-Frank Buxton Joint Film Productions

Original release
- Network: NBC
- Release: September 12, 1970 – September 4, 1971

Hot Dog was a Saturday morning documentary series for children, seen on NBC from September 12, 1970 to September 4, 1971. Created by Frank Buxton and co-produced by Buxton and Lee Mendelson, the program was notable for its hosts – comedienne Jo Anne Worley, comedian Jonathan Winters and writer and actor Woody Allen. The pilot, televised on March 28, 1970, starred Worley, Allen and Tom Smothers, who was replaced with Winters when the show became a series.

Based on Buxton's travels as a comedian (and later, as host of the ABC series Discovery), which took him on tours to various factories, Hot Dog explained, in a humorous manner, how we do things (such as snore) and how things were made (such as the eponymous hot dogs and their buns, plus condiments like mustard).

Seventy topics were covered during the course of this series, which lasted 13 episodes and was rerun the rest of the season. NBC won a Peabody Award for the series in 1970.

Some of the music in this series was performed by The Youngbloods.

== Syndication and alternate versions ==
Reruns of Hot Dog were syndicated during the 1977–1978 television season, at a time when Allen had firmly established himself as a motion picture star, director, and writer. Portions of Hot Dog were also seen on a local KNBC children's program in Los Angeles, That's Cat, which debuted in 1976.

In 1971, the Individual topic segments were sold to schools on 16mm film.

== Topics ==
(listed alphabetically)

1. "How does a frog jump?"
2. "How does a letter get through the mail?"
3. "How do they get toothpaste in the tube?"
4. "How do they make a baseball glove?"
5. "How do they make a hot dog roll?"
6. "How do they make a surfboard?"
7. "How do they make baseballs?"
8. “How do they make bicycles?”
9. "How do they make bowling balls?"
10. "How do they make bubblegum?"
11. "How do they make cartoons?"
12. "How do they make chocolate?"
13. "How do they make playing cards?"
14. "How do they make pennies?"
15. "How do they make plywood"
16. "How do they make spaghetti?"
17. "How do they make tennis shoes?"
18. "How do they make toothbrushes?"
19. "How do they make T-shirts?"
20. "How money is made"
21. "Is that really lead in a lead pencil?"
22. "What makes popcorn pop?"
23. "What's a compass?"
24. "Where does honey come from?"
25. "Where does lumber come from?"
26. "Where do felt tip pens come from?"
27. "Who invented the hot dog?"
28. "How do they make baseball bats?"
29. "How do they make pennys?"
30. "How do they make combs?"
