= Chapin Sisters =

American music duo

The Chapin Sisters
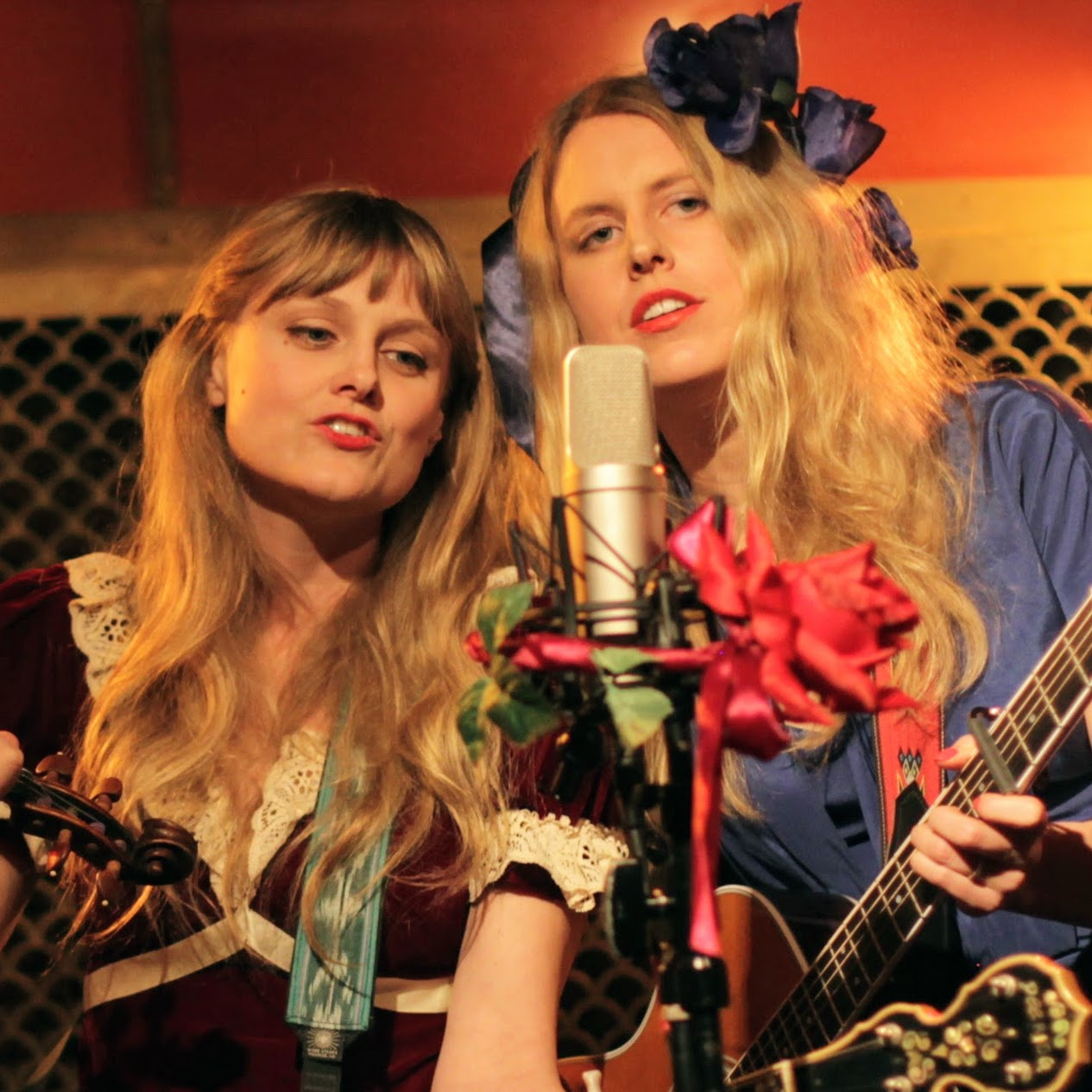
- The Chapin Sisters, Lily and Abigail (right), perform at Pete's Candy Store in Brooklyn in 2013

Background information
- Origin: Los Angeles, California, U.S.
- Genres: Folk, psychedelic, pop
- Years active: 2004–present
- Labels: Lake Bottom, Manimal, Loantaka, Plain
- Members: Abigail Chapin; Lily Chapin
- Past members: Jessica Craven
- Website: thechapinsisters.com

The Chapin Sisters are an American Folk Pop harmony duo from Brooklyn, New York. The band consists of sisters Abigail and Lily Chapin, and formerly their half-sister Jessica Craven. Known for their blood harmonies, their sound blurs the lines between old-time Appalachian music, Americana, classic country-rock and pop.

They have toured throughout the U.S. and the U.K. and have appeared in The New York Times, Rolling Stone Magazine, Elle Magazine, Popmatters, NPR's Weekend Edition with Scott Simon, American Songwriter, Wall Street Journal, The Boston Globe, The Los Angeles Times, NYT's T Magazine, Washington Post.

The Chapin Sisters also frequently perform with their father Tom Chapin, their cousin Jen Chapin, their uncle Steve Chapin and The Harry Chapin Band billed as 'The Chapin Family.'

== Early life ==
Abigail and Lily were born in Brooklyn, New York, and raised in the Hudson Valley. They got their start at ages 6 and 8, lending their signature harmonies to their Grammy-winning father Tom Chapin's children's records, which led to them appearing on other children's records, including the Olsen Twins' "Brother for Sale" and "I Am the Cute One". They frequently appeared onstage with members of their family, including cousin singer/songwriter Jen Chapin and their half-sister Jessica Craven, whose father was the late director Wes Craven (A Nightmare on Elm Street, Scream); at benefit and tribute concerts honoring their uncle, the late folk icon and activist Harry Chapin, best known for his #1 hit "Cats in the Cradle."

By 2004, Abigail, Lily, and Jessica had relocated to Los Angeles, where Lily Chapin was working on a film directed by Barbara Kopple. They formed a band at the urging of Jessica’s filmmaker brother Jonathan Craven (the Chapins’ half-brother) who arranged for them to record at the home studio of Michael Fitzpatrick (Fitz and the Tantrums). Before they ever played a live show, a demo of their slow, acoustic version of Britney Spears's song "Toxic" gained attention and radio play around the country. Following their unexpected success, The Chapin Sisters started to play live concerts in Los Angeles, and began writing music together—songs that would eventually become Lake Bottom LP, their debut full-length album.

== The Lake Bottom LP ==
In 2008, they released Lake Bottom LP on the Plain Recordings label. The album was featured in SPIN, The Los Angeles Times and Popmatters, who compared them to labelmate Cat Power, "Like Ms. Marshall, they haunt the interstices of folk, pop, and blues, and play seductive games with the knife-edge of heartache. Their soft harmonies and dark sidelong lyrics fit perfectly into a new folk aesthetic that is more twisted than freaky," and "their music blends the harmonies of traditional sister-acts with a modern lyrical sensibility."

== 2010, the departure of Jessica, Oh Hear The Wind Blow and Two ==
In early 2010, Jessica took a "leave of absence" from the band to spend time with her newborn baby. Lily and Abigail, now a duo, set out as touring band members for the folk pop duo She & Him (M. Ward and actress Zooey Deschanel) singing back-up vocals and opening many of the shows as well.

In April 2010, The Chapin Sisters released "Oh Hear the Wind Blow," a 5 song EP, recorded live in the studio with musician/engineer Dan Horne (Grateful Shred) on bass, and Aaron Sperske (Beachwood Sparks) on drums. Their single "Diggin A Hole" was featured as Today's Top Tune on KCRW.

On September 14, 2010, Abigail and Lily released their second full-length album "Two" on their own label, Lake Bottom Records. The album, produced by the sisters, along with Louie Stephens of Rooney and Jesse Lee of Gang Gang Dance, was featured in The New York Times and on NPR's Mountain Stage.

== A Date with the Everly Brothers ==
In 2013, they released A Date With the Everly Brothers, which debuted at #2 on iTunes Singer/Songwriter chart and at #2 on Amazon's Folk Best Seller chart. The full-length album tribute to The Everly Brothers was produced by The Chapin Sisters and Evan Taylor and was featured in Wall Street Journal, Elle Magazine and on NPR's Mountain Stage and NPR's Weekend Edition with Scott Simon.

== Today's Not Yesterday ==
In 2015, the band released Today's Not Yesterday, the 12-song album was recorded in Los Angeles at Jonathan Wilson's Five Star studio with the help of Dan Horne and Jesse Lee. The album was featured in The Boston Globe and Popmatters. Their single "Angeleno" was featured as Today's Top Tune on LA's KCRW.

== Ferry Boat ==
In 2018, they released Ferry Boat, a 5 song EP. Rolling Stone featured the single "Ferry Boat" on their Ten Best Country and Americana Songs of The Week and KCRW featured it on Today's Top Tune. The EP was produced by Evan Taylor and The Chapin Sisters. Popmatters premiered the music video for their second single "Bottle of Wine".

== "Bergen Street," "All Through The Night," "Wasting Your Time" ==
In 2023 and 2024, The Chapin Sisters released three singles of new material. "Bergen Street," an ode to Brooklyn, premiered on KLOF magazine and was featured in The Bluegrass Situation.

"All Through The Night," which was produced by Rusty Santos and featured Noah Kittenger (Bedroom), and was originally written as a lulliby to Abigail's eldest child, premiered on Popmatters and KCRW featured it as Today's Top Tune.

"Wasting Your Time," an "anticapatalist love song," was produced by J.J. Blair and featured Benmont Tench (Tom Petty and The Heartbreakers), on piano and Chad Cromwell, Neil Young's drummer, on drums. The song premiered on Americana UK and was featured in Relix.

== Collaborations ==
In 2014, The Chapin Sisters lent their voices to a cover version of "Unchained Melody," on She & Him's cover album "Classics". That same year, along with Peter Yarrow (Peter, Paul and Mary), and singer/songwriter Cass McCombs, they led 'The People's Climate March Bloc' for the People's Climate March in New York.

The Chapin Sisters and Cass McCombs have frequently collaborated. In 2018, as 'Cass McCombs and The Chapin Sisters', they released a cover of Fred Neil's song""The Dolphins". That same year, they recorded a cover of Woody Guthrie's "Deportee" for 'Songs for Swing Left', a compilation which raised awareness about the importance of voting. The album also included songs from Jackson Browne, The Nation's Matt Berninger, My Morning Jacket's Jim James, Warpaint and Andrew Bird.

In 2020, The Chapin Sisters and classical pianist Lara Downes recorded a cover of "We Shall Overcome," for Downes's album of spirituals and freedom songs"Some of These Days."

In 2022, they appeared, along with Haim's Danielle Haim, on "Belong to Heaven," Cass McComb's first single off his album "Heartmind." In 2023, they appeared on his children's album "Mr Greg & Cass McCombs Sing & Play New Folk Songs for Children" (Smithsonian Folkways).

== Discography ==
=== Studio records ===
Year	Album	Label	Peak chart positions
Year	Album	Label	Heatseekers
2004	The Chapin Sisters Sing the Chapin Brothers	Sundance Music	—
2005	The Chapin Sisters EP	Lake Bottom Records	—
2007	The Chapin Sisters/The Winter Flowers: Split LP	Manimal Vinyl	—
2008	Lake Bottom LP	Plain Recordings/Lake Bottom Records	—
2010	Two	Lake Bottom Records	—
2010	Oh, Hear the Wind Blow	Lake Bottom Records	—
2013	A Date with the Everly Brothers	Lake Bottom Records	14
2015	Today's Not Yesterday	Lake Bottom Records	—
2018	Ferry Boat EP	Loantaka Records	—

=== Featured appearances & singles ===
Year	Song	Album	With Artist
2007	"Borderline"	Through The Wilderness: A Tribute To Madonna	The Chapin Sisters
2008	"Vagabonds", "Omaha Nights", "Blue Grass", "To Die a Happy Man," "We'll Get By" "She Only Calls Me on Sunday," "I Wanna Get High."	"Vagabonds"	Gary Louris
2010	"Gimmie, Gimmie, Gimmie", "Nervous Breakdown"	Gimmie Gimmie Gimmie: Reinterpreting Black Flag	Various Artists
2014	"Unchained Melody"	Classics	She & Him
2017	"We Will Stop"	Threads	Tom Chapin ft. The Chapin Sisters
2018	"The Dolphins"	Single	Cass McCombs & The Chapin Sisters
2018	"This Pretty Planet," "Ladies of the Line," "Together Tomorrow," "Walk the World Now, Children"	Tom Chapin & Friends at The Turning Point (Live)	Tom Chapin & Friends
2020	"We Shall Overcome"	Some of These Days	Lara Downes & Friends
2022	"Belong To Heaven"	Single	Cass McCombs
2023	"I'm a Nocturnal Animal"	Mr Greg & Cass McCombs Sing & Play New Folk Songs For Children	Mr. Greg & Cass McCombs
2023	"Bergen Street"	Single	The Chapin Sisters
2023	"All Through The Night"	Single	The Chapin Sisters
2024	"Sweet Ella Jenkins"	Single	Mr. Greg ft. The Chapin Sisters
2024	"Wasting Your Time"	Single	The Chapin Sisters
