= Jen Chapin =

American singer-songwriter

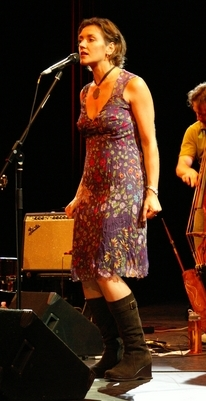
- Chapin at the Dix Hills Center for the Performings Arts, Long Island, August 4, 2007

Background information
- Born: March 21, 1971 (age 54) Rockville Centre, New York, U.S.
- Genres: Progressive jazz, folk rock, progressive rock
- Occupation(s): Singer, songwriter, producer
- Instrument: Vocals
- Labels: Hybrid, Purple Chair
- Website: www.jenchapin.com

Jennifer Chapin is an American singer-songwriter. She is the daughter of the singer-songwriter Harry Chapin and Sandra Chapin. She serves on the board of directors of WhyHunger, a grassroots support organization founded in 1975 by her father and the current executive director Bill Ayres. She has been compared at times with Laura Nyro, Tori Amos and Alanis Morissette.

Chapin's website describes her music as "jazz tinged urban folk soul...incorporating the funk, soul and improvisation of the city".

She studied at Brown University and the Berklee College of Music. She is also the sixth cousin of country singer Mary Chapin Carpenter.

In her recent years, Jen Chapin has taken up the occupational role of a high school history teacher, specializing in global history and teaching at a local Brooklyn high school.

== Discography ==
- 2000 Live at the Bitter End (Purple Chair Music)
- 2002 Open Wide (Purple Chair Music)
- 2004 Linger (Hybrid Recordings)
- 2006 Ready (Hybrid Recordings)
- 2008 Light of Mine (Purple Chair Music)
- 2009 ReVisions: Songs of Stevie Wonder (Chesky)
- 2013 Reckoning (Purple Chair Music)
