= Gimmie Gimmie Gimmie: Reinterpreting Black Flag =

Compilation album by various artists
- Released: 2010
- Genre: Punk, Country
- Label: The Secret Life of Records

Gimmie Gimmie Gimmie: Reinterpreting Black Flag is a tribute album to the then-defunct American hardcore punk band Black Flag featuring ex-band members Dez Cadena, Keith Morris and Kira Roessler. They are joined by fellow SST label mates Joe Baiza (Saccharine Trust) and Mike Watt (Minutemen) as well as The Chapin Sisters and Jimmy Destri of Blondie, produced by Evan Taylor.

== Track listing ==
All songs originally written and recorded by Black Flag except where noted.

1. Rise Above
2. Gimmie Gimmie Gimmie
3. Six Pack
4. Nervous Breakdown
5. In the Jailhouse Now (Jimmie Rodgers and Elsie McWilliams)
6. Thirsty and Miserable

== Personnel ==
- Dez Cadena – vocals (1,3,6)
- Kira Roessler - vocals (2,4)
- Keith Morris - vocals (5)
- Mike Watt - bass (3,5)
- Joe Baiza - guitar (5)
- The Chapin Sisters - vocal (2,4)
