= Occasional Wife =

American TV sitcom (1966–1967)

- Main Cast
- Genre: Sitcom
- Created by: Lawrence J. Cohen; Fred Freeman
- Written by: Richard Baer; Peggy Chantler Dick; Lawrence J. Cohen; Robert Riley Crutcher; Stan Cutler; William Davenport; Martin Donovan; John Erman; Fred Freeman; Lila Garrett; Bernie Kahn; Gene Thompson; Martin Ragaway; Shorty Rogers
- Directed by: Jerrold Bernstein; Bob Claver; Danny Dayton; Paul Junger Witt; Richard Kinon; Russ Mayberry; Gary Nelson; Ernest Pintoff
- Starring: Michael Callan; Patricia Harty
- Narrated by: Vin Scully
- Theme music composer: Ernest Pintoff; Howard Greenfield
- Composers: Ernest Pintoff; Shorty Rogers
- Country of origin: United States
- Original language: English
- No. of seasons: 1
- No. of episodes: 30

Production
- Executive producer: Harry Ackerman
- Producer: Bob Claver
- Camera setup: Single-camera
- Running time: 30 minutes
- Production company: Screen Gems

Original release
- Network: NBC
- Release: September 13, 1966 – August 29, 1967

Occasional Wife is an American sitcom that aired on NBC from September 13, 1966 until August 29, 1967.

== Plot ==
Peter Christopher is a New York bachelor who enjoys the single life but is blocked in his professional advancement without a wife. Peter's boss, baby-food manufacturer Max Brahms, is a strong believer in marriage and family. Peter asks young hat check girl Greta Patterson to pose as his wife at company functions. In return, Peter rents Greta an apartment in his building. Greta uses the fire escape to slip into Peter's apartment whenever his boss visits unexpectedly. A man who lives on the floor between Peter's and Greta's apartments bemusedly watches them as they pass.

== Cast ==
- Michael Callan as Peter Christopher
- Patricia Harty as Greta Patterson
- Jack Collins as Max Brahms
- Stuart Margolin as Bernie
- Chris Noel as Marilyn
- Bryan O'Byrne as Man-in-the-Middle
- Jack Riley as Wally Frick
- Sara Seegar as Mrs. Christopher
- Susan Silo as Vera
- Joan Tompkins as Mrs. Brahms
- Vin Scully as Narrator (uncredited)

Callan and Harty married in 1968.

== Episodes ==
No.	Title	Directed by	Written by	Original release date
1	"Pilot"	Ernest Pintoff	Lawrence J. Cohen & Fred Freeman	September 13, 1966
Peter, a young executive, finds his road to success blocked by the lack of a wife, so he begins a platonic relationship with Greta, who poses as his wife.
2	"Occasional Trouble"	Richard Kinon	Robert Riley Crutcher	September 20, 1966
Peter's mother sees Greta kissing her boyfriend and thinks her son's wife is being unfaithful.
3	"The Rivalry"	Bob Claver	Lawrence J. Cohen & Fred Freeman	September 27, 1966
Spending the weekend at the home of a wealthy client becomes a contest as Peter and his rival vie for favor.
4	"He Who Burns Bridges"	Richard Kinon	Stan Cutler & Martin Donovan	October 4, 1966
Peter must retrieve his letter of resignation from his boss' office before it is read.
5	"I Do, We Don't"	Bob Claver	Lawrence J. Cohen & Fred Freeman	October 11, 1966
Peter's mother insists that he and Greta repeat their marriage vows since she missed the original "marriage ceremony."
6	"The Promotion"	Bob Claver	Peggy Chantler Dick	October 18, 1966
Peter jeopardizes his potential raise and promotion by chasing after a beautiful blonde.
7	"No Cookie for Dessert"	Jerry Bernstein	Stan Cutler & Martin Donovan	October 25, 1966
A sharp-eyed girl figures out Peter's phony marital setup and threatens to tell his boss.
8	"Danger! Woman at Work"	Richard Kinon	William Davenport	November 1, 1966
Greta fraternizes with her new boss, upsetting both Peter's business and social life.
9	"A Friend of the Family"	Bob Claver	Stan Cutler & Martin Donovan	November 15, 1966
Mr. Brahms jumps to an erroneous conclusion when Greta is hospitalized with a virus.
10	"Marriage Counselor"	Richard Kinon	Richard Baer	November 22, 1966
Mr. Brahms sees Greta at a discothèque with a strange man and tells Peter about it.
11	"No Talent Scouts"	Bob Claver	Richard Baer	November 29, 1966
Peter is given the uncomfortable task of finding a Broadway role for the untalented daughter (Sally Field) of a client.
12	"That's How They Got Capone"	Richard Kinon	Peggy Chantler Dick	December 6, 1966
Peter and Greta do their best to avoid signing a joint tax return.
13	"GP Loves UU"	Bob Claver	Stan Cutler & Martin Donovan	December 13, 1966
An Italian Count searches for an American girl who will adore and support him.
14	"Miss Greta Regrets"	Richard Kinon	Peggy Chantler Dick	December 20, 1966
Peter and Greta play musical chairs in a restaurant while trying to date simultaneously in two rooms.
15	"Peter by Moonlight"	Richard Kinon	Stan Cutler & Martin Donovan	December 27, 1966
Peter underwrites a small garment business.
16	"Alias Peter Patterson"	Bob Claver	Stan Cutler & Martin Donovan	January 3, 1967
Peter becomes the object of affection of a shy, unattractive girl.
17	"Fair Play for Gypsies"	John Erman	Richard Baer	January 17, 1967
Mr. Brahms has a gypsy fortune teller fired after she says that Greta is single.
18	"A Couple of Home-Cooked Meals"	Gary Nelson	Lila Garrett & Bernie Kahn	January 24, 1967
Peter and Greta complicate matters by making separate dinner plans.
19	"One Plus One Equals Too Many"	Russ Mayberry	Gene Thompson	January 31, 1967
Peter gets a new job and fires Greta.
20	"Kangaroo Kandidates"	Gene Reynolds	Stan Cutler & Martin Donovan	February 7, 1967
Mr. Brahms gets Peter and Wally into competition to join his exclusive club.
21	"The New Secretary"	Jerry Bernstein	Peggy Chantler Dick	February 14, 1967
An important customer sees Peter at lunch with his new secretary.
22	"The Business Trip"	Jerry Bernstein	Peggy Chantler Dick	February 21, 1967
Greta agrees to accompany Peter on a business trip to her hometown.
23	"Engagement, Christopher Style"	Gene Reynolds	Stan Cutler & Martin Donovan	February 28, 1967
Peter tries to break an engagement to a madcap heiress without losing his job.
24	"Instant Fatherhood"	Danny Dayton	Martin A. Ragaway	March 21, 1967
A young woman that Peter sponsored as an immigrant arrives from Italy with marriage on her mind.
25	"The Soft Spot"	Bob Claver	Stan Cutler & Martin Donovan	March 28, 1967
Peter's job catches the eyes of efficiency experts brought in by the company.
26	"The Secret Powdered Milk Affair"	Bob Claver	Stan Cutler & Martin Donovan	April 4, 1967
Government agents run a security check on Brahms employees and discover all is not what it appears in Peter's marriage.
27	"My Occasional Brother's Keeper"	Jerry Bernstein	Gene Thompson	April 11, 1967
One fib leads to another and Peter soon finds himself playing host to a stranger.
28	"An Affair to Forget"	Paul Junger Witt	Lawrence J. Cohen & Fred Freeman	April 18, 1967
Suspicions arise that make it seem that Greta is having an affair with Mr. Brahms.
29	"Oil Be Seeing You"	Bob Claver	Stan Cutler & Martin Donovan	April 25, 1967
Greta attempts to rescue Peter from a terrible financial investment.
30	"So Little Time"	Richard Kinon	Stan Cutler & Martin Donovan	May 9, 1967
Peter and Greta are hard pressed to prevent his mother from discovering the truth.

== Production ==
Fred Freeman and Lawrence J. Cohen created the show. Ernst Pintoff was the director. Harry Ackerman was the executive producer for the series, which was produced by Screen Gems in association with NBC. Thirty episodes were filmed in color with a laugh track. Lever Brothers and Brown & Williamson were among the sponsors.

The series was broadcast from 8:30 to 9 p.m. Eastern Time on Tuesdays. It first experienced good ratings, tying at #18 with The Man from U.N.C.L.E. in the Nielsen ratings. The series then fell to #64 in the ratings after having to compete against ABC's popular series The Invaders and the CBS staple The Red Skelton Show. Occasional Wife was canceled after one season.

== Critical response ==
Jack Gould, writing in The New York Times, highlighted Harty's work, saying "she made a viewer more aware of what was right than wrong" with the show. Noting that the story line was a "well-worn gambit", he complimented the creators and the director for dealing with it in a "warmly understated" way. He added that Callan should become a "worthy foil" for Harty. Gould ended his review by urging the ending of "stop-action camera nonsense, wherein an offstage narrator tries to be coyly amusing between scenes".
