= That's Cat =

American children's television show

That's Cat was a children's television show that premiered on Saturday, September 18, 1976. It was both produced by and aired on KNBC, the NBC owned and operated (O&O) station in Los Angeles, California; it was also syndicated to selected NBC O&O stations.

That's Cat was created by Executive Producer Giovanna Nigro-Chacon who wrote the weekly feature "Grandpa". Ms. Nigro-Chacon also wrote and produced the only special in the series - the hour-long "That's Cat Christmas". She received a Los Angeles Area Emmy Award nomination for her work.

The show's first episode credits Susan Cuscuna (co-producer), Perry Krause (co-producer), and Myra Cohen as writers. It starred Alice Playten (as "Alice"), Frank Cala (as "Me", a mime), and Whitman Mayo (as "Grandpa"). The show interspersed segments involving stories, music, humor, and various learning-centered activities. The word "Cat" in the title is connotatively used in place of "Cool."

The show's first episode debuted at 7:30 p.m. on a Saturday night, a move intended to interest parents. The second episode aired in its regular Sunday morning 8:00 a.m. time slot the following day. That same night, a compilation episode of segments from the first two episodes aired at 6:30 p.m. The show moved to the 7:30 a.m. time slot a few episodes later.

Among the more notable features of the first episode was a segment with a song in Spanish; a clip of Woody Allen describing where mustard comes from (likely from a 1970 NBC series Hot Dog); and a feature on the importance of garbagemen.

The show's theme song ("That's Cat") was sung by John Sebastian, who also sang the theme song to the 1970s TV show Welcome Back Kotter, and his son, who echoed the words "That's Cat", during the repeated chorus.

THEME SONG LYRICS

Hey Pumpkin, come along with me
Been thinkin' 'bout some things to see
Take a look at this and that
We'll find something that's cat
That's Cat - That's Cat
It a-means that you like that!
Like an Indian drum or a kiss from your mom,
Or gettin' something under your hat.
Imagination, and doin' it yourself
Sometimes, what's Cat in one spot ain't Cat somewhere else
That's Cat - That's Cat - That's Cat!

Recurring segments on the show included "Can you find 'Me/me' in this picture" ("Me" being "Alice's" sidekick on the show); and a segment where "Grandpa" spoke directly to the camera offering sage advice in a sweet manner to the main character, Alice.

The show received a nomination for a 1976 Los Angeles Area Emmy award (for film editor Donn Hoyer). In 1979, a Los Angeles-based consumer group—Coalition on Children and Television—selected the show for an award for excellence.
