= The Violinist (1959) =

1959 animated film

- Directed by: Ernest Pintoff
- Written by: Ernest Pintoff
- Starring: Carl Reiner
- Music by: George Steiner
- Production company: Pintoff Productions
- Distributed by: Kingsley International Films
- Release date: 1959
- Running time: 8 minutes
- Country: United States
- Language: English

The Violinist is a 1959 is an animated short film by Ernest Pintoff. It won for Best Animated Film at the 1959 BAFTA Awards. The movie was nominated for that year's Best Animated Short Film at the Oscars.

== Plot ==
Harry, a street violinist, plays so badly that even his dog cannot stand the sound. Despite trying music lessons and various other methods to improve, he makes no progress. Only when he follows the advice to suffer for his art does his playing finally improve.
