= Sister, Sister (1982 film) =

1982 American drama television movie by Maya Angelou

- Title card
- Genre: Drama; Family
- Written by: Maya Angelou
- Directed by: John Berry
- Starring: Diahann Carroll; Irene Cara; Rosalind Cash; Dick Anthony Williams; Paul Winfield
- Theme music composer: Alex North
- Country of origin: United States
- Original language: English

Production
- Executive producer: Irv Wilson
- Producers: Maya Angelou; John Berry
- Cinematography: Gayne Rescher
- Editor: Art Seid
- Running time: 98 minutes
- Production company: 20th Century Fox Television
- Budget: US $50,000

Original release
- Network: NBC
- Release: June 7, 1982

Sister, Sister is a 1982 American drama television movie written by Maya Angelou and starring Diahann Carroll, Rosalind Cash, and Irene Cara. The film tells the story of three sisters who come together to decide the fate of their family home after the death of their revered father. Originally filmed in February 1979, the film was shelved for three years before debuting on June 7, 1982, on NBC.

== Plot ==
The story starts out in a small North Carolina town with Carolyne Lovejoy (Carroll), a schoolteacher, singing in the choir at her church. It is later revealed that she is having an intense affair with the church's married pastor, Rev. Henderson (Dick Anthony Williams), who is also the state's senator-elect. Carolyne later comes home from church to find her younger, 20-year-old sister Sissy (Cara), who Carolyne raised after their parents died, with her boyfriend Tommy, much to Carolyne's disapproval. Sissy wants to become a professional ice skater, but Carolyne wants Sissy to be a schoolteacher like her.

Their battle continues throughout the movie. Later, their estranged sister Frieda (Cash), who has been living in inner-city Detroit for the last 13 years, shows up with her 12-year-old son Danny (Kristoff St. John). They decide to stay for a while because Danny has had some trouble with the law in Detroit and Frieda wants to give him a fresh start in a new environment. While the Lovejoy sisters try to co-exist in their family house (which their late father left to all three of them), their lives turn upside down. Frieda suggests selling the house since Sissy will be out on her own soon and Carolyne doesn't need all the extra space by herself.

Frieda emerges as the troubled black sheep of the family, while Carolyne is knocked off her martyr pedestal when Frieda seduces the reverend. Sissy learns that their father never wanted another daughter, but had hoped she would be the son that eluded him (their mother tried to abort her). After Frieda and Carolyne get into a vicious catfight, Frieda and Sissy both decide to leave. The movie ends with Sissy leaving for New York and Frieda deciding to stay in North Carolina and work things out with Carolyne.

== Production ==
Although the movie was filmed in February 1979, NBC chose to withhold it until June 1982, when it aired during primetime. According to JET, Fred Silverman, who was the head executive of the network at the time, decided not to air the film because it did not match his preferred formats of "action-packed or comedy shows," and that the film's focus on the intense personal dramas of middle-class blacks would not appeal to white sensibilities of the late 1970s. After Silverman's resignation, the new network president, Grant Tinker, decided to make his mark on NBC's programming by debuting all of the productions that Silverman had shelved.

Though set in North Carolina, Sister, Sister was filmed on location in Montgomery, Alabama and Opelika, Alabama. The historic Old Ship A.M.E. Zion Church in Montgomery was used for the church scenes, and the interior and exterior of the Lovejoy house were filmed at the J.W. Darden House in Opelika.

== Awards ==
The film won the NAACP Image Award for Outstanding Television Movie, Mini-Series or Dramatic Special. Cara won the NAACP Image Award for Outstanding Actress in a Television Movie, Mini-Series or Dramatic Special for her role in the film.

== Cast ==
- Diahann Carroll – Carolyne Lovejoy, the eldest sister, a schoolteacher
- Rosalind Cash – Frieda Lovejoy-Burton, the middle sister
- Irene Cara – Sistina "Sissy" Lovejoy, the youngest sister, an aspiring ice skater
- Paul Winfield – Eddie Craven
- Dick Anthony Williams – Rev. Richard Henderson, Carolyne's pastor
- Kristoff St. John – Daniel "Danny" Burton, Frieda's son (credited as Christopher St. John)
- Robert Hooks – Harry Burton, Frieda's estranged husband, a struggling musician
- Diana Douglas – Pawnshop Proprietor
- Lamont Johnson – Tommy, Sissy's boyfriend who Carolyne dislikes
- Albert Popwell – Drunken Man
- Frances Williams – Mother Bishop
- Alvin Childress – Mister Jacobs
- Gloria Edwards – Mrs. Henderson
- Music Performed by Bobby Jones and the New Life Singers
