= Gilbert Lewis (actor) =

American actor (1941-2015)

- Born: April 6, 1936; Philadelphia, Pennsylvania, U.S.
- Died: May 7, 2015 (aged 79); Philadelphia, Pennsylvania, U.S.
- Occupation: Actor
- Years active: 1970–1995

Gilbert Lewis (April 6, 1936 – May 7, 2015) was an American actor who is best known for playing The King of Cartoons in the first season of the 1986 children's show, Pee-wee's Playhouse. Lewis played the King of Cartoons in thirteen episodes before being replaced by actor William Marshall. He also made guest appearances on The Fresh Prince of Bel-Air, General Hospital, and Alien Nation.

== Filmography ==
Year	Title	Role	Notes
1970	Cotton Comes to Harlem	1st Black Beret	
1971	Who Killed Mary What's 'Er Name?	Solomon the Cop	
1971	The Pursuit of Happiness	George Wilson	
1972	Across 110th Street	Shevvy	
1972	Together for Days	Big Bubba	
1973	Gordon's War	Spanish Harry	
1981	Body and Soul	Tony	
1989	Blaze	Rev. Marquez	
1992	Candyman	Detective Frank Valento	
1995	Don Juan DeMarco	Judge Nyland	
