= The Critic (1963 film) =

1963 film by Ernest Pintoff

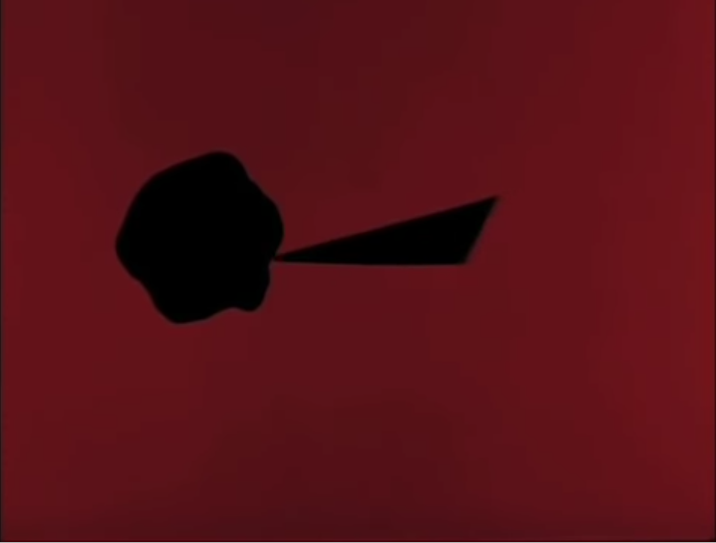
A scene from The Critic; grumpy narrator Mel Brooks speculates that this is birth with the thing being attacked.

The Critic is an American 1963 short animated film by Ernest Pintoff and Mel Brooks. It won the Oscar for Short Subjects (Cartoons) in 1964.

== Background ==
The film was reportedly inspired by an actual incident. In 1962, Mel Brooks attended a screening of an abstract animated short by Norman McLaren, where he overheard another audience member, an old immigrant man, "mumbling to himself" about the lack of a plot. Brooks was inspired to create a film out of this experience.

Brooks contacted Ernest Pintoff, who had experience producing animated works such as Flebus. They agreed to create a short film based on two points: the visuals of the film had to be fashioned in a style similar to that of McLaren, and Brooks would have no specific warning of the content. He intended to improvise his monologue. Pintoff and animator Bob Heath completed the visuals as agreed, then Brooks watched the result and improvised his monologue for the accompanying soundtrack. He used a Russian Jewish accent and attempted to find lines appropriate for an old man "trying to find a plot in this maze of abstractions." Henry Jenkins points out that the comments themselves belong to a recognizable narrative mode, the stream of consciousness.

== Plot ==
Simple, abstract, geometric shapes move and morph on the screen to harpsichord music, from a French Suite (BWV 816) by J. S. Bach. The voice of an audience member, who claims to be 71, complains throughout the film despite being told repeatedly by other audience members to keep quiet.

The onscreen images feature geometric patterns. The "cranky and clueless" old man is trying to make sense of them, and describes what he sees at various points, including a squiggle, a fence, a cockroach. The old man finds that certain images remind him of the biology classes of his Russian boyhood. When two abstract shapes approach each other and unite, the old man sees it as a mating sequence. "...They like each other. Sure. Lookit da sparks. Two things in love!... Could dis be the sex life of two things?"

When the scene shifts from the "mating" to other abstract images, the old man gets bored. He proclaims the images must be symbolism, then adds that they are "symbolic of junk."

He concludes that some of the images, depicting lips, are "dirty". He admits at some point that he was looking for "a hot French picture". The implication is that the old man is in the wrong movie theater, probably one screening art films.

He also wonders why the creator of the film wasted his time with this. He points that this creator could instead do something meaningful, like driving a truck, or do something constructive, like working in shoemaking.

== Analysis ==
Mel Brooks came to prominence as a performer by playing the 2000 Year Old Man (1961). This "ancient Jewish gentleman" had a characteristic voice and manner of speaking; a "raspy", "gravelly" rambling voice with a Yiddish accent. To American audiences the accent implied a foreign-born background, German Jewish or Eastern European. In The Critic, Brooks serves as the narrator. He essentially reprises his role of the 2000 Year Old Man with minor variations. The tone of voice is "marginally deeper", the dialogue-style of the original role is replaced with a fragmented monologue. But otherwise there is little to set apart the two roles.

Brooks voices a character who is heard but not seen onscreen. He is unnamed, identified only as an old man from Russia. The character is an audience member in a movie theater which is screening the film within a film. Said film is an experimental film. Clearly unfamiliar and unappreciative of such films, the old man delivers witty and insulting commentary. Donald Weber points out that with his "contemptuous" common sense the old man unmasks the pretensions of art criticism.

James Monaco suggests that the film approaches matters of film criticism in a humorous way. When the old man complains about the two dollars he paid to see this worthless film, he is touching on two subjects: what does the film audience get for the money they spend on a film; how can the "cinematic value" of a film be determined? Monaco mentions the other film viewers, who seem to be enjoying the film within a film, which implies that there are subjective tastes when approaching a film, and consequently that the "cinematic value" is a matter of relative points of view.

Kevin Murphy recalls the film as his introduction to the concept of riffing (MSTing). He describes the onscreen images as abstract pop-art animation, similar to that used in art classes and supposedly educational television. He describes the soundtrack as a droning and nondescript tune, somewhat reminiscent of Jazz and Baroque pop. And above them the voice of the old man provides riffing-style commentary, voicing what everybody else is thinking. He finds that the film addresses a key subject of audience reaction. The audience members have paid to see the work of an artist, and discovered that said work is "awful". Then why should they be expected to "just... sit there, shut up, and just take it?". They can instead start riffing, in an attempt to make their film-going experience at least "tolerable, fun".

== Release ==
The film debuted on 20 May 1963, at New York City's Sutton Theater, on Manhattan's East Side. The film benefited by being screened for weeks alongside a popular British comedy, Heavens Above! (1963). The animated short received positive reviews by film critics, as a "spoof of the pseudo-art film". Positive reviews appeared in The New York Herald Tribune and The New York Times.

== Reception ==
The film won the Academy Award for Best Animated Short Film at the 36th Academy Awards and a BAFTA Award for Best Animated Film from the British Academy of Film and Television Arts at the 17th British Academy Film Awards

The film won a West Germany film festival award.

== Sources ==
- Jenkins, Henry (November 9, 2012), "Mel Brooks, Vulgar Modernism, and Comic Remediation", in Horton, Andrew; Rapf, Joanna E. (eds.), A Companion to Film Comedy, John Wiley & Sons, pp. 151–171, doi:10.1002/9781118327821.ch7, ISBN 978-1-1183-2785-2
- Monaco, James (2009), "Film Theory:Form and Function", How to Read a Film:Movies, Media, and Beyond, Oxford University Press, ISBN 978-0-1997-5579-0
- Murphy, Kevin (2011), "Foreword: Riffing and You (and Riffing)", in Weiner, Robert G.; Barba, Shelley E. (eds.), In the Peanut Gallery with Mystery Science Theater 3000: Essays on Film, Fandom, Technology and the Culture of Riffing, McFarland & Company, ISBN 978-0-7864-8572-7
- Parish, James Robert (2008), "Becoming the Critic", It's Good to Be the King: The Seriously Funny Life of Mel Brooks, John Wiley & Sons, ISBN 978-0-4702-2526-4
- Symons, Alex (2012), "Adapting the 2000 Year Old Man, 1961-1983", Mel Brooks in the Cultural Industries: Survival and Prolonged Adaptation, Edinburgh University Press, ISBN 978-0-7486-6450-4
- Weber, Donald (2003), "Accents of the future: Jewish American popular culture", in Kramer, Michael P.; Wirth-Nesher, Hana (eds.), The Cambridge Companion to Jewish American Literature, Cambridge University Press, ISBN 978-0-5217-9699-6

== See also ==
- List of American films of 1963
- Mystery Science Theater 3000
- Independent animation
