= Bill Owen (announcer) =

American writer and radio announcer (born 1931)

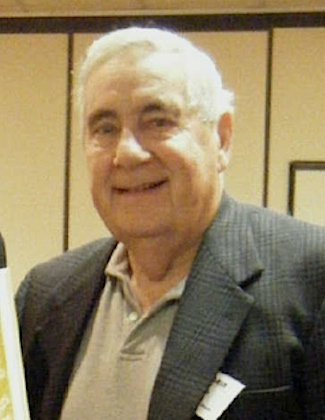
- Bill Owen in 2013
- Born: February 1, 1931 (age 95); Grand Forks, North Dakota, U.S.
- Known for: Writer; Radio/Television announcer

Bill Owen (born February 1, 1931), widely known as the King of Trivia, is an American writer and radio and television announcer whose career spans six decades. He served as host and announcer for the children's program Discovery in the 1960s.

== Background ==
Bill Owen was born in Grand Forks, North Dakota, on February 1, 1931. His father Owen T. Owen (born in Milbank, South Dakota on September 15, 1890) was an outstanding track star at the University of North Dakota where he graduated from law school. He held many public offices including state tax commissioner and chairman of the state's Workman's Compensation bureau.

Owen's mother Else Rohde Owen (born in Milwaukee, Wisconsin on September 12, 1893) was the daughter of the founder of Congress Candy Company, a major manufacturer and distributor of candy. She was prominent in social activities and education. Owen's two brothers, Owen T. Owen Jr. ("Tudor") and Jack served in the United States Navy and United States Army respectively so when Owen joined the United States Air Force he completed the circle of all three branches of the military.

== Early life ==
Owen participated in football, baseball, basketball, and track as a young man and became an avid fisherman, water and snow skier, and licensed pilot and one day achieved his dream of parachuting from an airplane.

He was editor of his high school newspaper (the Bismarck, North Dakota "Hi-Herald") and after three years of pre-med studies at the University of Southern California, he switched his major to telecommunications. He started his announcing career at USC working on campus stations KTRU and KUSC-FM.

== Announcing career ==
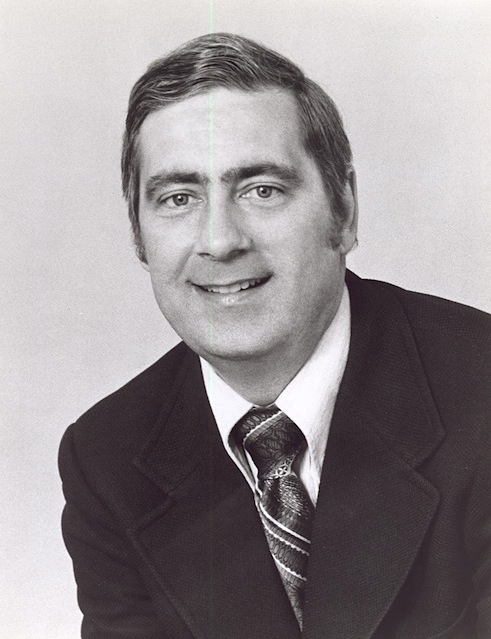
Press portrait as an announcer c.1965

After graduating cum laude, Owen entered service and was assigned to the American Forces Network in Germany where he did play-by-play announcing of football, basketball, and baseball. He later returned to North Dakota and worked for KFYR radio and TV in Bismarck as an announcer, sports director, and cowboy entertainer "Marshal Bill."

Marshal Bill Deputy Card, 1956

Initially, Owen was reluctant to play the part of Marshal Bill; he wanted to focus on doing sports. One other announcer, Gus Becker, heard about the show and was eager to do it if Owen refused. Owen recommended Gus, but the management told Owen he was the right person for it. One year Owen was asked to lead the annual rodeo parade, which is by far the biggest event in Bismarck-Mandan, to the extent that one year they had a Hollywood movie cowboy lead it. Owen practiced riding for several weeks so he would look his best, waving to the crowd and throwing candy kisses to the youngsters along the parade route.

While in service he met Rosemary Bobo of Gray Court, South Carolina, a high school home economics teacher, and they were married on October 1, 1955. Their three children are Carolyn, a well-known singer-musician-songwriter/artist/horse-trainer, Richard, a banking executive, and Lisa, a horse-trainer and the owner of a horse stable and riding academy.

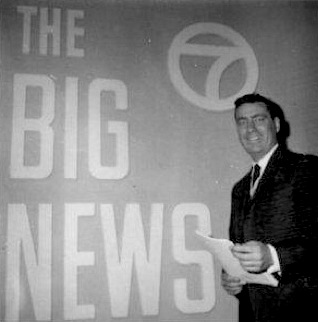
Bill as Ch7 staff announcer c. early 1960s.

Owen joined WLW radio and TV in Cincinnati, Ohio in 1957 as a staff announcer. In 1958-1960 he hosted a classical and semi-classical music radio program called "Music for You" which surprisingly beat rock stations in the ratings. Owen had an eclectic taste in music, later emceeing rock, pop, and big band formats.

The WABC Swinging Seven on Vespa cycles in 1960 (from left): Jack Carney, Chuck Dunaway, Herb Oscar Anderson (above), Bill Owen, Scott Muni, Charlie Greer, and Farrell Smith.

Three years later Owen was chosen by ABC for its staff. He stayed for thirty years during which time he did news and sports on both radio and television. Among his many sports assignments was filling in for Howard Cosell on Howard's sports shows and post-New York Mets broadcasts. Owen was also selected to become a disc jockey on WABC radio ("MusicRadio 77") as one of the station's original "Swinging Seven" which also included Scott Muni, Herb Oscar Anderson, Chuck Dunaway, Jack Carney, Farrell Smith, and Charlie Greer (who was known for always spraying the microphone for germs when his shift began).

The WABC Swingin' Sound Survey (1961), Bill Owen at lower-right.

The "Swinging Seven" were heavily promoted through full page photos of the DJs in major newspapers, billboards with their photos around the city, posters advertising their "Swingin' Sound Surveys", and constant playing on air of their promos. They also made public appearances attired in trademark bright red blazers.

In 1966 he was elevated from being the show announcer of the award-winning young people's series "Discovery" to succeeding Frank Buxton as host. He and actress Virginia Gibson ("Seven Brides for Seven Brothers") continued as hosts for five more years, traveling throughout the world.

During his years at ABC, Owen co-wrote with announcer Allan Jefferys a novel about a disc jockey titled DJ published by Popular Library. Later he collaborated with Frank Buxton on a volume initially self-published as Radio's Golden Age: The Programs and the Personalities, by Easton Valley Press. This was later greatly expanded, re-titled, and published as The Big Broadcast 1920-1950” (Viking Press, Avon paperback). It was later re-issued in 1997 in a second edition by Scarecrow Press. This was the first encyclopedia of old-time radio programs.

While working as a free-lancer, Owen did many on-camera and voice-over commercials for national television, and portrayed Ellery Queen in the nationally syndicated series "Ellery Queen's Minute Mysteries". It ran for many years on radio stations, allowing time for local commercials.

Owen also wrote the popular syndicated panel Return with Us to... with drawing by comic strip artist Don Sherwood. This nostalgic remembrance of the past enjoyed a long run in Grit, a national weekly newspaper.

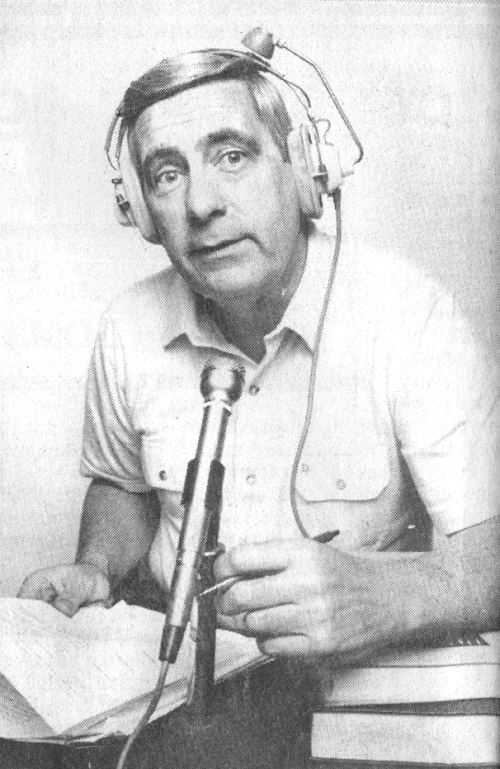
Bill Owen - King of Trivia

From 1982 to 1990, Owen was announcer for ABC-TV's World News This Morning where he contributed brief trivia items along with puzzles and quotations. That segment became the most popular part of the program and developed a cult following. In addition he appeared on the program and on "Good Morning America" as a sports anchor. His sports knowledge also led to assignments on "ABC's Wide World of Sports" and live coverage of the Olympics. In 1962 he covered the America's Cup yacht races from Newport, Rhode Island for ABC Radio from the Goodyear Blimp.

After leaving ABC in 1990, Owen was the principal voice of superstation WWOR-TV for three and a half years and then brought back WNEW's legendary Make Believe Ballroom for two radio stations in New Jersey where he interviewed such stars as Tony Martin, Cyd Charisse, Kitty Kallen, Margaret Whiting, Al Martino, Les Paul, Patti Page, Julius La Rosa, Jo Stafford, Les Brown, Frankie Laine, Don Cornell, and Patty Andrews. Owen also acted in the role of "TV Announcer #2" in the film production of The Handmaid's Tale, released in 1990.

== Retirement: "The King Of Trivia" ==
In retirement, Owen wrote The Over 60 Trivia Book, All Those Things My Teacher Never Told Me, and Runners-up, Bridesmaids, & Second Bananas, the first two books illustrated by his daughter Carolyn.

He recently released a new book, Dropping Names, which takes the reader on a 60-year plus trip through the world of broadcasting, introducing us to the famous and not-so-famous that he met and worked with along the way.

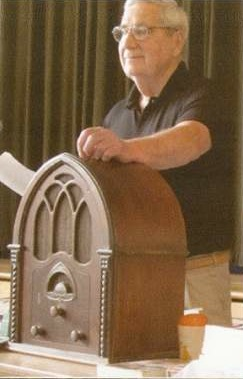
Bill Owen giving a public talk on Old-Time Radio

He continues to do radio and TV commercials, the best-known being a series for the National Motor Museum Mint featuring replicas of popular cars and trucks from the past. He also appears before senior clubs with a nostalgia program about old-time radio and other memories of the 1930s and 40s.

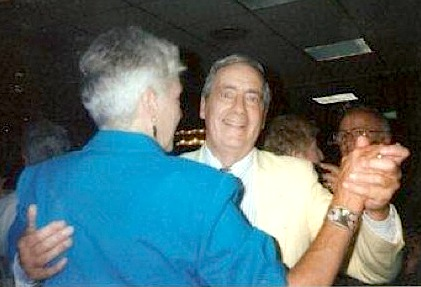
Bill and wife Rosemary ballroom dancing

Owen and his wife Rosemary are contract bridge players and ballroom dancers, who have performed publicly, specializing in the Peabody, Paso Doble, and Viennese Waltz. Owen is also known for his interest in crossword puzzles, particularly those considered highly challenging.

== See also ==
- Discovery (American TV series)
