= Disco Beaver from Outer Space =

- Genre: Comedy; Fantasy; Horror
- Written by: Peter Elbling; Jeff Greenfield
- Directed by: Joshua White
- Starring: Lynn Redgrave; Rodger Bumpass; Peter Elbling
- Music by: Alice Playten; Walter E. Sear
- Country of origin: United States
- Original language: English

Production
- Producers: Tony Hendra; Matty Simmons
- Cinematography: Tony Foresta
- Editor: Lenny Davidowitz
- Running time: 51 minutes
- Production company: National Lampoon

Original release
- Network: HBO
- Release: February 23, 1979

Disco Beaver from Outer Space is a 1979 American science fiction fantasy comedy television film. It is an early production by National Lampoon, and was made for HBO.

The short film is a collection of comedy sketches, contained within the main story which is centered on two characters: the protagonist, an extraterrestrial in the form of a human sized (and bipedal) beaver; and the antagonist, a gay vampire called "Dragula". Among the various side gags (which arise as the "viewer" channel-surfs) is a short concert by a stereotyped band of Irish singers called "The Spud Brothers" (potato-shaped puppets).

Tagline: National Lampoon's mockery of everything that is wrong with cable TV.

== Plot ==
The film is essentially a shaggy dog story, leading up to a single play-on-words joke based on "beaver" also being a euphemism for female genitals. At the film's climax, the vampire is frightened by the Beaver; in his delirium, he begins seeing double, thus seeing two images of the Beaver. He cries, "Split beaver!" and disintegrates.

== Cast ==
- Lynn Redgrave - Dr. Van Helsing
- Rodger Bumpass
- Peter Elbling - Dragula, Queen of Darkness
- Gilbert Gottfried - Construction Worker
- James Widdoes - Construction Worker
- Alice Playten
- Lee Wilkof
- Michael Simmons
- Sarah Durkee

== See also ==
- List of National Lampoon films
