= Frank Buxton =

American actor (1930–2018)

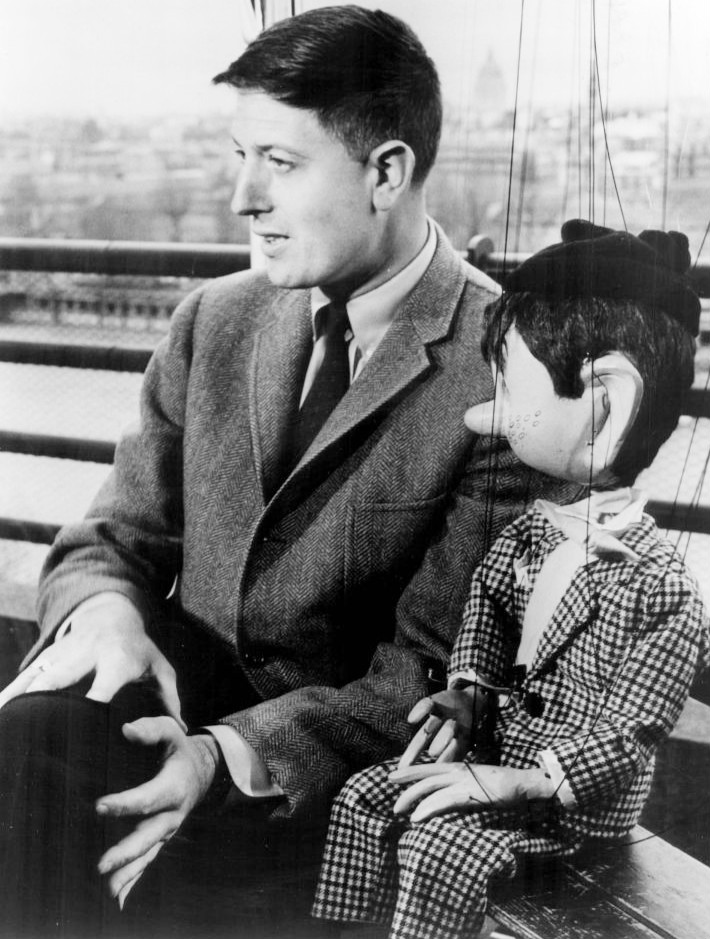
- Buxton in 1966
- Born: February 13, 1930; Wellesley, Massachusetts, U.S.
- Died: January 2, 2018 (aged 87); Bainbridge Island, Washington, U.S.
- Occupations: Actor, television writer, author, television director
- Years active: 1949–2013
- Spouse: Cynthia Lovelace Sears (1982-2018; his death)

Frank Buxton (February 13, 1930 – January 2, 2018) was an American actor, television writer, author, and television director.

== Career ==
Buxton grew up in Larchmont, New York. He was a graduate of Northwestern University (B.S.) and Syracuse University (M.S.), and served in the U.S. Army in Korea.

Buxton's acting career extends from summer theatre in Three Men on a Horse with the legendary Buster Keaton at age 19. He worked as a producer-director at WGN-TV in Chicago, as well as Buffalo stations WGR-TV and WBUF-TV. Turning to performing, Buxton performed his own stand-up comedy act at comedy clubs from coast to coast. He toured Australia for a year as Albert in Bye Bye Birdie. His first TV credit was as host and producer of the ABC television documentary series, Discovery co-hosted by actress/singer Virginia Gibson from 1962 to 1966. Buxton also did the narration, as well as all of the voices, for the "Silly Record" LP (1962 on Harmony Records).

In 1966, Buxton teamed up with Hal Seeger in the animated cartoon series Batfink, providing the voice for the title character in all 100 episodes, as well as its recurring villain Hugo A-Go-Go. As a writer, Buxton co-authored with Bill Owen on two books covering the golden age of radio - The Big Broadcast and The Golden Age. Owen succeeded Buxton as host of Discovery from 1966 to 1971. Buxton also hosted the game show Get the Message for ABC in 1964, later to be replaced by Robert Q. Lewis.

For much of the 1970s, Buxton worked as a writer, producer and director for Paramount Television. He served as a story editor for the comedy anthology series Love, American Style, in addition to writing and directing episodes of The Odd Couple, Happy Days and Mork & Mindy. Buxton also created, wrote, produced and directed the television series Hot Dog for NBC, which starred Woody Allen, Tom Smothers, Jonathan Winters, and Joanne Worley. The series won a Peabody Award in 1970. Buxton played roles in numerous TV series, movies, and commercials such as Xerox and Safeway Markets, to name a few.

He spent the end of his life in Bainbridge Island, Washington, where he was active in community theatre and numerous philanthropic activities. Buxton continued to perform regularly with The Edge, an improvisational comedy group at Bainbridge Performing Arts. He was also a regular cast member on the web cooking show Cookus Interruptus.

== Death ==
Frank Buxton died on January 2, 2018, in Bainbridge Island, Washington from heart-related issues. At the time of his death, he was still active in local theater and improv.

== Filmography ==
Film
Year	Title	Role	Notes
1966	What's Up, Tiger Lily?	Vocal Assist	Voice
1987	Overboard	Wilbur Budd	
1988	Beaches	Doctor	
1991	Frankie and Johnny	Minister	
2012	Grassroots	Old Man	Uncredited
Television
Year	Title	Role	Notes
1961	Discovery	Co-host	
1966	Batfink	Batfink	Voice
1989	Chip 'n Dale: Rescue Rangers	Mr. Starfish	Voice, Episode: "A Creep in the Deep"
1994	Roommates	Mr. Thomas	Television movie
