= Harvey Middleman, Fireman =

1965 film by Ernest Pintoff

- Directed by: Ernest Pintoff
- Written by: Ernest Pintoff
- Produced by: Robert L. Lawrence
- Starring: Eugene Troobnick; Hermione Gingold; Arlene Golonka; Patricia Harty
- Cinematography: Karl Malkames
- Edited by: David Donovan; Hugh A. Robertson Jr.
- Music by: Ernest Pintoff
- Distributed by: Columbia Pictures Corporation
- Release date: July 12, 1965
- Running time: 76 minutes
- Country: United States
- Language: English

Harvey Middleman, Fireman is a 1965 American comedy film written and directed by Ernest Pintoff. It is Pintoff's first feature film, having previously only made shorts.

The film follows the story of a fireman named Harvey Middleman who lives a humble life; he loves his kids, he loves his wife, and he really loves his job. One night Harvey saves a young model from a burning building and it is love at first sight. Harvey then struggles to determine what he should do. Comedy ensues as Harvey often breaks the fourth wall and the film does not take itself seriously at all.

== Plot ==
Harvey Middleman (Eugene Troobnick), a New York City fireman, lives happily in a New Jersey suburb with his wife (Arlene Golonka) and two small children. Harvey loves his life but after a fight with his wife over dinner one night he imagines himself rescuing a beautiful young girl from a fire. Just as he dreamt it, he rescues a young model named Lois (Patricia Harty). Harvey steals a kiss from her as he resuscitates her and the two quickly fall in love. After secretly dating her several times, Harvey decides he must solve his moral dilemma by consulting his psychiatrist Mrs. Koogleman (Hermione Gingold). Mrs. Koogleman however is too preoccupied with her own relationship problems to help Harvey with his conundrum. Another fire breaks out in Lois's apartment, and this time one of Harvey's associates Dinny (Will Mackenzie) rescues Lois while Harvey saves a cat. Lois and Dinny quickly fall in love and Harvey is left to return to his wife.

== Cast ==
- Eugene Troobnick as Harvey Middleman: A simple fireman who loves his job. He is the film's main character and often shows impulsive tendencies such as when he cheats on his wife after saving Lois from a fire.
- Hermione Gingold as Mrs. Koogleman: Harvey's trusting psychiatrist. While she attempts to help Harvey she is more concerned with her own issues with her husband.
- Patricia Harty as Lois: A young and beautiful model who falls in love with Harvey after he saves her from a fire. She seems to have impulsive qualities similar to Harvey but with the stereotypical “dumb blonde” personality.
- Arlene Golonka as Harriet: Harvey's loving and dedicated wife. Tries to make Harvey happy as best as she can.
- Will Mackenzie as Dinny.
- Ruth Jaroslow as The Mother: Harvey's nagging mother. Often showed in flashbacks.
- Charles Durning as Dooley: One of Harvey's co-workers, later falls in love with Lois after he saves her from a fire.
- Peter Carew as Barratta.
- Stanley Myron Handelman as Mooky.
- Trudy Bordoff as Cindy.
- Neil Rouda as Richie.
- Gigi Chevalier as Comet Receptionist.
- Stacy Graham as Librarian.
- Maurice Shrog as Mr. Koogleman: Husband to Mrs. Koogleman.

== Production ==
Produced by Robert L. Lawrence in association with Ernest Pintoff.

== Theatrical release ==
Released 12 Jul 1965 in New York. Also on the bill were 3 of Pintoff's cartoons: "The Interview," "The Critic" and "The Old Man and the Flower."

== Critical reception ==
Enthusiasm for the film was subdued. Bosley Crowther, in The New York Times, wrote "As a matter of fact, the idea for this modestly-made comedy would provide just enough substance for a brisk animated short." and "the vein does not seem to feed as freely into a 75-minute film, performed by human actors, as it does into an 8-minute cartoon" when referring to some of Pintoff's earlier credits, while Craig Butler's AMG review reported that "A satirical fable about middle class life in 1960s America, Middleman starts out promisingly but eventually turns conventional and rather predictable." and "If Middleman disappoints, it's still an off-beat, mildly entertaining little film".
