= Old Ship African Methodist Episcopal Zion Church =

Historic church in Alabama, United States

- U.S. National Register of Historic Places
- Alabama Register of Landmarks and Heritage
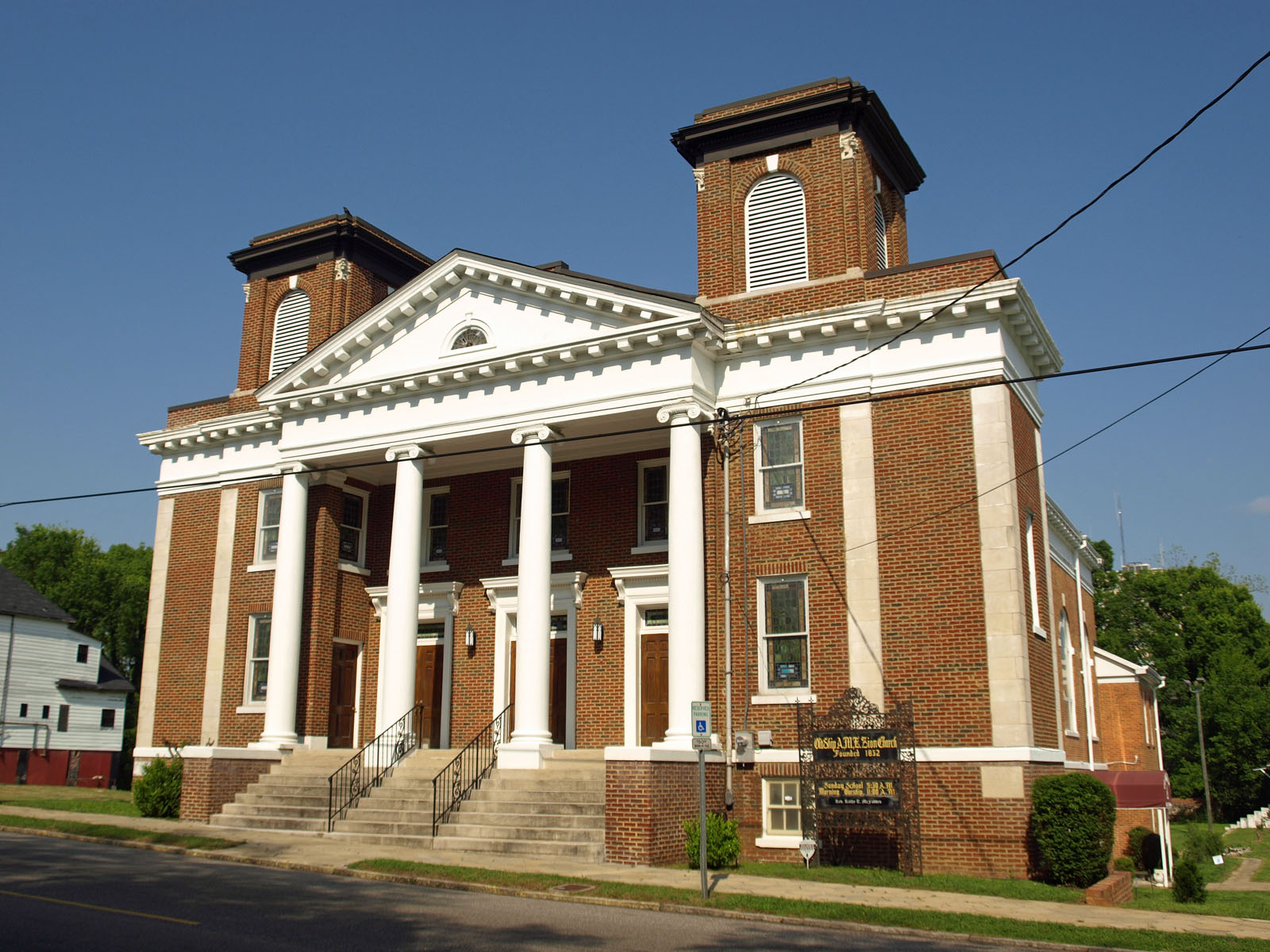
- Old Ship in 2009

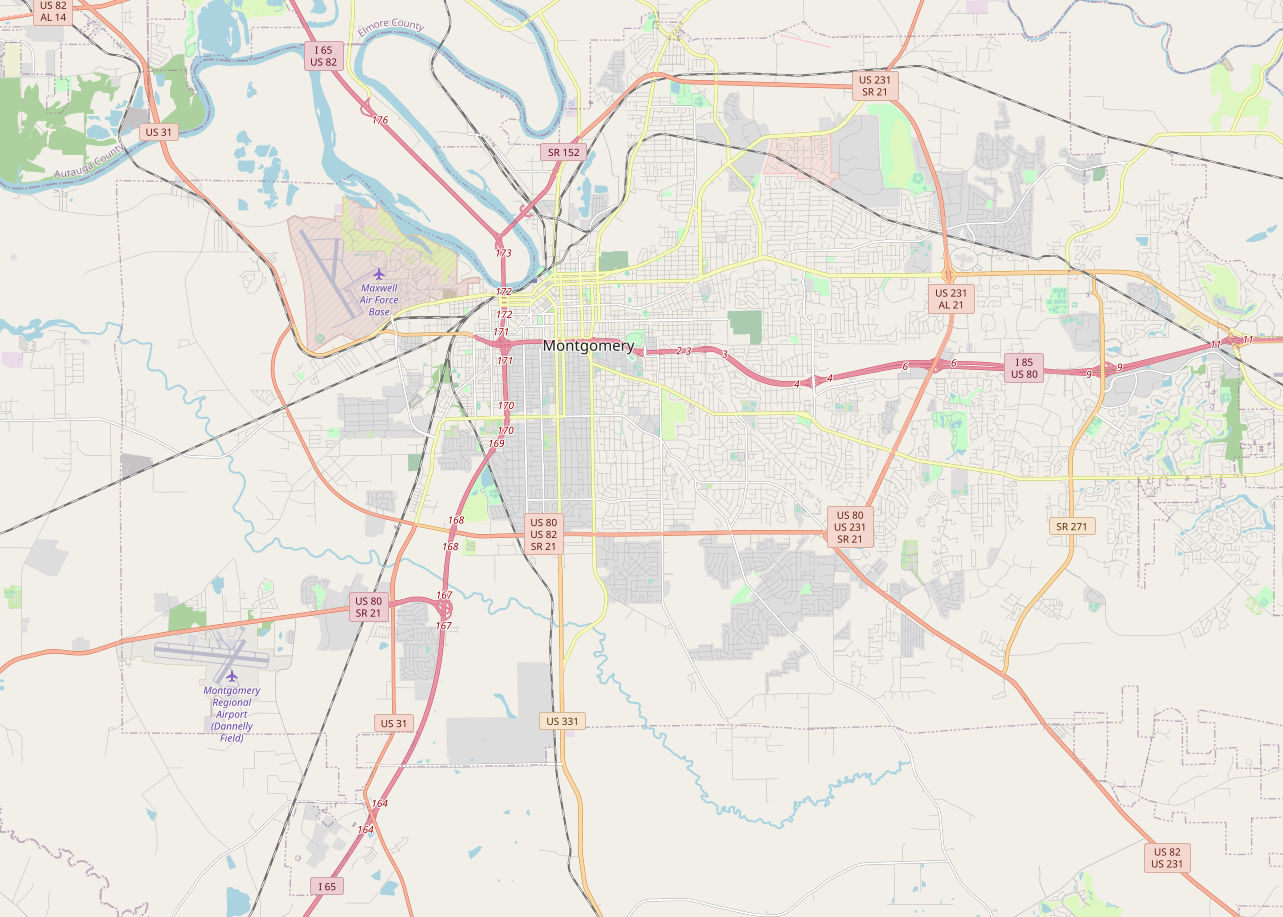
- Location within Montgomery, Alabama Location within Alabama Location within the United States
- Location: 483 Holcombe St., Montgomery, Alabama
- Coordinates: 32°22′17″N 86°18′42″W
- Area: less than one acre
- Built: 1918
- Architect: Jim Alexander
- Architectural style: Classical Revival
- NRHP reference No.: 90002177

Significant dates
- Added to NRHP: January 24, 1991
- Designated ARLH: March 3, 1976

Old Ship African Methodist Episcopal Zion Church is a historic African Methodist Episcopal Zion Church in Montgomery, Alabama. It is the oldest African American church congregation in the city, established in 1852. The current Classical Revival-style building was designed by Jim Alexander and was completed in 1918. It is the fourth building the congregation has erected at this location. Scenes from the 1982 television movie Sister, Sister were shot at the church. It was placed on the Alabama Register of Landmarks and Heritage on March 3, 1976, and the National Register of Historic Places on January 24, 1991.

== See also ==
- Properties on the Alabama Register of Landmarks and Heritage in Montgomery County, Alabama
