= Roommates (1994 film) =

1994 American made-for-television drama film

- DVD cover
- Written by: Robert W. Lenski
- Directed by: Alan Metzger
- Starring: Randy Quaid; Eric Stoltz; Elizabeth Peña; Charles Durning
- Theme music composer: Lee Holdridge
- Country of origin: United States
- Original language: English

Production
- Producers: Jack H. Degelia; Michael Filerman; Tom Rowe
- Cinematography: Geoffrey Erb
- Editor: Seth Flaum
- Running time: 100 minutes
- Production companies: Pacific Motion Picture Productions; Michael Filerman Productions

Original release
- Network: NBC
- Release: May 30, 1994

Roommates is a 1994 American television film written by Robert W. Lenski and directed by Alan Metzger. The film stars Randy Quaid, Eric Stoltz, Charles Durning, Elizabeth Peña, Frank Buxton and Jill Teed. It aired on NBC on May 30, 1994. The film was inspired by a true story of two men dying from AIDS.

== Plot ==
The movie is inspired by a true story and deals with a heterosexual ex-convict on parole for bank robbery Jim Flynn, who contracted AIDS from a blood transfusion and Bill Thomas, a gay wealthy Harvard-educated professional, also dealing with the disease. They become unlikely roommates at a hospice for people with AIDS. Initially full of mutual disdain, the roommates regard one another with cultural snobbery and stereotypical intolerance. One reads Moby Dick and wears neckties, and the other smokes, drinks and watches sports on a blaring TV. The relationship gradually develops into a durable friendship.

== Cast ==
- Randy Quaid as Jim Flynn
- Eric Stoltz as Bill Thomas
- Elizabeth Peña as Lisa
- Charles Durning as Barney
- Frank Buxton as Mr. Thomas
- Jill Teed as Barbara Thomas
- Babz Chula as Norma
- Philip Maurice Hayes as Mickey
- Kenn Hooker as Eldon

== Production ==
Executive producer Michael Filerman and NBC knew the movie was going to be a hard sell to advertisers, and NBC felt like the controversial subject matter would require having feature actors in it who normally don't do television, to "give it a sense of more import". So feature actors Randy Quaid and Eric Stoltz were cast in the lead roles. Stoltz said he wanted to do the movie for a couple of reasons: "I liked the script and I knew Randy was doing it...and I respect him tremendously." Before production began on the film, Stoltz and Quaid visited various hospices in Los Angeles and Vancouver, where the film was shot. Stoltz said that the majority of the hospice residents were open about talking about their illnesses. Several patients worked as extras in the film.

The movie was shot in just 18 days, but NBC was hesitant to give it an airdate during a sweeps period. In an interview with TV critics in January, Quaid said he didn't know why the airdate was put off; the movie "may not be the most popular thing to look at, or the most entertaining or exciting action piece, but it has real issues and deals with them realistically". Stoltz said he was "befuddled" about the airdate and also opined that "maybe NBC feels they have much better movies to show...or maybe they're afraid." The film eventually received an airdate of May 30, five days after the sweeps period ended.

== Critical reception ==
The Los Angeles Times wrote that "Robert Lenski’s teleplay and Alan Metzger’s direction avoid land mines of sentimentality with a narrative full of surprises and candid emotions...and aside from its strong acting and technical polish, the production’s thematic achievement is twofold: (1) it demolishes the myth that AIDS is a gay disease and (2) it refreshingly punctures holes in the prejudices of both straights and gays." TV critic John J. O'Connor wrote that "for all its relentless predictability, it frequently manages to be remarkably affecting, thanks to two extraordinarily fine performances...by Mr. Stoltz...who brings to the reserved, finicky Bill an enormous reservoir of strength...and Mr. Quaid who manages to convey the loneliness and submerged tenderness of Bill as he acerbically flails away at the world in general."

Tom Shales, TV critic for the Washington Post wasn't impressed with the film writing: "it seems contrived and antiseptic...the producers deserve credit for doing an AIDS awareness film, and probably for making a statement on behalf of compassion, but the movie comes off as compromised and flat". Variety gave accolades to the actors saying, "Quaid and Stoltz perform at high standards...and Elizabeth Pena turns in a strong supporting performance as a social worker" They also complimented the director for keeping things running smoothly and capitalizing on witty situations.

== See also ==
- An Early Frost
- In the Gloaming
- List of made-for-television films with LGBT characters
