= Animals, Animals, Animals =

- Genre: Educational
- Created by: Lester Cooper
- Presented by: Hal Linden
- Country of origin: United States
- Original language: English
- No. of seasons: 6

Production
- Executive producer: Lester Cooper
- Producers: Peter Weinberg, Al Brodax

Original release
- Network: ABC
- Release: September 12, 1976 – November 8, 1981

Animals, Animals, Animals is a 1976–1981 educational television series on ABC about animals. The program, produced by ABC News with animated segments produced by Al Brodax, was hosted by Hal Linden. The show aired in most markets at Sunday mornings at 11:30 am Eastern Time.

== Show format ==
The show often began with Linden giving a monologue about an animal that was going to be that day's subject. In-between songs, animated segments, and interviews from experts about said animal was more exposition from Linden. The show looked at the presentation of animals in mythology, art and literature, as well as biology and zoology.

Information about animals was provided by Roger Caras and, songs about animals were performed by Lynn Kellogg, who also performed the opening theme song. Zoo personnel and animal researchers frequently appeared on the show. During segments about animals, voiceover was provided by Estelle Parsons and Mason Adams.

== Show history and production ==
The show first aired on September 12, 1976, replacing Make a Wish on ABC's Sunday morning schedule. Animated segments were provided by Al Lowenheim, Arland Barron, Jeff Melquist, Jim Comstock, Ray Pointer, and Stacey Mann of Lions' Den Studio and David Labelle of David Labelle Animation Studios.

Five years later, in 1981, Animals, Animals, Animals was replaced by This Week with David Brinkley; this marked the end of ABC's scheduling of children's programming on Sunday mornings, a practice which began with Discovery (the predecessor to Make a Wish) in the 1960s.

Series creator Lester Cooper convinced Hal Linden to host the show after explaining to him they wanted to do a Sherwood Schwartz-like educational series. Originally Linden was only going to do narration but Linden requested to also be involved in live action portions of the show. "I've been chewed by a camel, crawled over by a tarantula, butted by a bull, clawed by an eagle, wrestled by an alligator, and peed upon by virtually every creature on Earth" joked Linden. Linden decided to do the show because he thought it was the rare children's television show that wasn't an "insult" to children. Taping an episode was sometimes taxing due to the on-location aspect of filming, which host Linden was prepared for due to the long taping sessions his sitcom Barney Miller would often require. Linden also lamented over how the show was often the "first to go" on days when baseball was airing on ABC due to its 11:30 am timeslot in most markets.

Cooper worked to try and make a show educational as well as appealing to children. "We approach each creature that we examine from his place in history, in mythology, in literature, in art, in music," Cooper recalled in a 1976 interview with the Los Angeles Times.

== Reception ==
The series won Emmys for four consecutive years and the Peabody Award. It won the 1978 Emmy Award for Outstanding Children's Informational Series. The show also won the Action for Children's Television ACT Prize for excellence in children's programming.

In a negative review from The New York Times, Carol Rinzler wrote that she thought Hal Linden's demeanor was "depressed" while presenting the show and said that despite the songs and animation, the expositions that bookended those segments hurt the show. Rinzler concluded that the show was "boring, boring, boring", mocking the title of the show. Los Angeles Times columnist Cecil Smith was a lot more positive about the show, calling Lynn Kellogg's songs "charming". Smith also, in a contrast from Rinzler, called Linden "the soul of the show, giving it an easy charm, a wry wit, and, at times, a naivete that matches his youngest viewer. He has a nice way of gathering in the elements of the show."
