= Jill Teed =

Canadian actress

- Born: April 9, 1964 (age 62)
- Occupation: Actress
- Years active: 1992–present

Jill Teed (born 9 April 1964) is a Canadian actress. She is an actress who has appeared in many sci-fi roles. She has appeared in a number of television guest roles such as Street Justice, The X-Files, Stargate SG-1, Sliders, and The Outer Limits.

== Career ==
Teed has appeared in such feature films as X2 as Bobby Drake's mother, Mission to Mars and Godzilla. She played the role of FBI Agent Kaayla Brooks in "Reluctant Heroes", a Season Four episode of Highlander: The Series. She played Maggie Sawyer, a Metropolis police officer, on Smallville. She had roles in both Galactica and The L Word. She played Colonel Lasky in the web series Halo 4: Forward Unto Dawn. She had a prominent supporting role in the television film Seasons of the Heart (1994).

== Filmography ==
=== Film ===
Year	Title	Role	Citations
1992	Impolite	Beth	
1995	Bad Company	Jane	
1995	Dangerous Indiscretion	Webster	
1995	The Final Cut	Daniels	
1999	Turbulence 2: Fear of Flying	Kit	
2000	Mission to Mars	Reneé Coté	
2001	Along Came a Spider	Detective Tracie Fisher	
2003	X2	Madeline Drake	
2004	Going the Distance	Claire	
2005	An Unfinished Life	Bartender	
2009	American Pie Presents: The Book of Love	Miss Johnson	Video
2010	Charlie St. Cloud	Grace Carroll	
2013	Independence Daysaster	Spears	
2018	Boundaries	Principal Mueller	

=== Television ===
Year	Title	Role	Citations
1992	Street Justice	Officer Rice	Episode: "Partner in Crime"
1993	The X-Files	Glenna	Episode: "The Jersey Devil"
1994	Seasons of the Heart	Ellen	
1994	Roommates	Barbara Thomas	TV film
1994	Party of Five	Joanna	Episode: "Pilot"
1994	Hawkeye	Sarah Pritchard	Episode: "The Furlough"
1995	Sliders	Serena Braxton	Episode: "The Weaker Sex"
1995	The Marshal	Marshal Van Horne	Episode: "The New Marshal"
1995	Deceived by Trust: A Moment of Truth Movie	Christina Beckett	
1995	Highlander: The Series	Kaayla Brooks	Episode: "Reluctant Heroes"
1995–1996	Strange Luck	Mystery Woman, September Rehne	Episodes: "Brothers Grim", "Blinded by the Son"
1996	Abduction of Innocence	Karen Carter	
1996	When Friendship Kills	Jolene	TV film
1997	Viper	Marshal Trent	Episode: "Cold Storage"
1998	Creature	SEAL Gray	TV miniseries
1998	Welcome to Paradox	Nora	Episode: "Options"
1998	First Wave	Talia	Episode: "Undesirables"
1998–2000	The Outer Limits	Carolyn / Tory Beth Walters / Gwen Hutchinson	Episodes: "Criminal Nature" "What Will the Neighbors Think?" "Abaddon"
1999	Night Man	Sister Agnes	Episode: "Spellbound"
1999	The Net	Jane Farraday	Episodes: "Zero", "Last Man Standing"
1999	The Sentinel	Marika Layton	Episode: "The Real Deal"
2000	Freedom	Dr. Packard	Episode: "Lonewolf"
2000–2002	Cold Squad	Laura	Recurring role (seasons 4–5)
2001–2006	Stargate SG-1	Yolanda Reese / Stacy Monroe	Episodes: "Wormhole X-Treme!", "200"
2002	Damaged Care	Lisa Rudolph	TV film
2002	Beyond Belief: Fact or Fiction	Valerie Simms	1 episode
2002	First Shot	Michele	TV film
2002	Just Cause	Colonel Larch	Episode: "Code of Silence"
2003	John Doe	Judge Marjorie Rustin	Episode: "Family Man"
2003–2008	Smallville	Maggie Sawyer	Episodes: "Insurgence", "Exile", "Exposed", "Descent"
2004	The Days	Suzie Colter	Episode: "Day 1,370: Part 1"
2004	Battlestar Galactica	Sergeant Hadrian	
2005	Zixx	Janice	Recurring role (season 2)
2005	Young Blades	Elise Parisot	Episode: "The Chameleon"
2006	The L Word	Teri	
2006–2007	Falcon Beach	Peggy Tanner	Recurring role
2007–2008	Flash Gordon: A Modern Space Opera	Mrs. Laura Gordon / Norah Gordon	TV series
2010	Caprica	Colonel Sasha Patel	Episode: "End of Line"
2011	Fairly Legal	Margo Harvey	Episode: "Bo Me Once"
2011	He Loves Me	Suzanne	
2011	Possessing Piper Rose	Kim Carlson	
2012	Supernatural	Madeline	Episode: "The Slice Girls"
2012	Halo 4: Forward Unto Dawn	Colonel Lasky	TV miniseries
2012	Battlestar Galactica: Blood & Chrome	Commander Ozar	
2012	Ring of Fire	Jennifer Hough	TV miniseries
2013	Arctic Air	Molly	Episode: "Stormy Weather"
2013	Dangerous Intuition	Alison Barnes	TV film
2013	Continuum	Lewis	3 episodes
2014	Pants on Fire	Diane Parker	TV film
2014	Arrow	Dr. Avery Pressnall	Episode: "Draw Back Your Bow"
2014	The Christmas Shepherd	Greta	TV film
2014	Polaris	Lis	TV miniseries
2015	A Gift of Miracles	Molly Dixon	TV film
2015	Signed, Sealed, Delivered: Truth Be Told	Harriet Bullock	TV film
2015	Signed, Sealed, Delivered: The Impossible Dream	Harriet Bullock	TV film
2016	Unreal	Bea	Episode: "Guerilla"
2016	Mr. Write	Risi	TV film
2016	Autumn in the Vineyard	Glow Sorrento	
2016	Operation Christmas	Kim Clark	TV film
2017	The Christmas Train	Roxanne	TV film
2018	The Sweetest Heart	Kristine Benoit	TV film
2018	When Calls the Heart	Greta Preston	2 episodes
2018	iZombie	Emily Charles	Episode: "Insane in the Germ Brain"
2018–2020	Siren	Patti McClure	Recurring role
2019	The Twilight Zone	Dotty Matheson	Episode: "A Traveler"
2019	A Blue Ridge Mountain Christmas	Linda Peterson	TV film
2019	Van Helsing	President Archer	
2021	Superman & Lois	Sharon Powell	4 episodes
2025	Watson	Mrs. Cromartie	Episode: "The Man with the Alien Hand"
