= Dick Anthony Williams =

American actor (1934–2012)

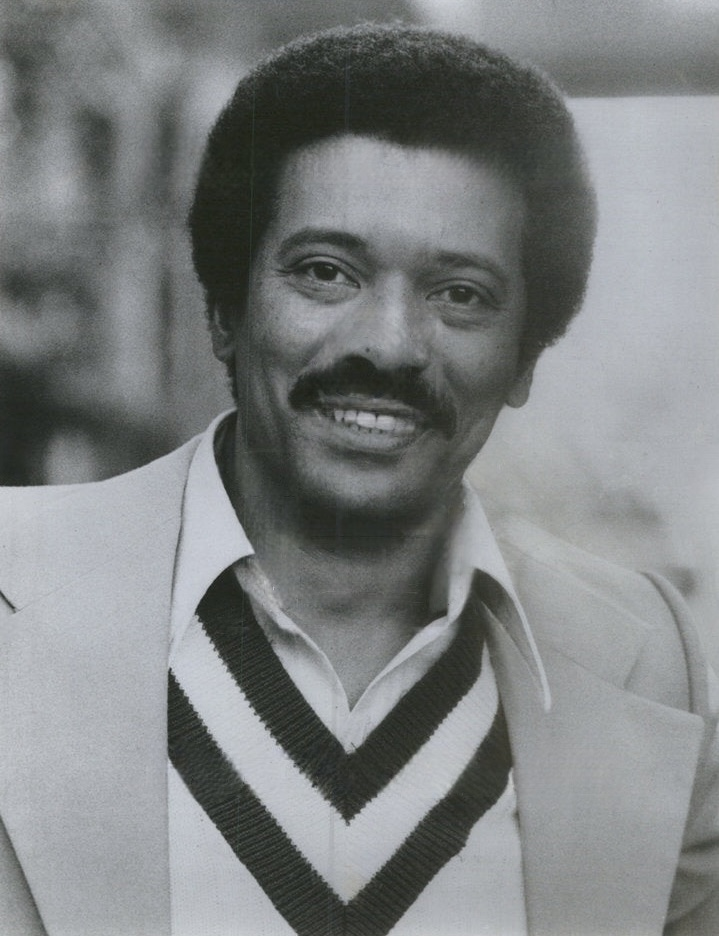
- Williams in 1983
- Born: Richard Anthony Williams; August 9, 1934; Chicago, Illinois, U.S.
- Died: February 16, 2012 (aged 77); Van Nuys, California, U.S.
- Education: Hyde Park High School; Herzl Junior College
- Occupation: Actor
- Years active: 1968–2011
- Spouse: Gloria Edwards (m. 1974; died 1988)
- Children: 3

Richard Anthony Williams (August 9, 1934 – February 16, 2012) was an American actor. He was best known for his starring performances on Broadway in The Poison Tree, What the Wine-Sellers Buy and Black Picture Show. Williams also had notable roles in 1970s blaxploitation films such as The Mack and Slaughter's Big Rip-Off.

== Early life ==
Born in Chicago, Illinois, Williams was raised in the Bronzeville neighborhood. During his early childhood, Williams spent several years in a local hospital due to having polio. For high school, Williams attended Hyde Park Academy High School. Williams later attended Herzl Junior College (now known as City Colleges of Chicago).

== Career ==
Williams began his career during his late teens as a member of Williams Brothers Quartet, a singing group founded in Chicago. He later moved to Los Angeles and began his acting career. Some of Williams roles included Pretty Tony in The Mack (1973), the limo driver in Dog Day Afternoon (1975), Denzel Washington's father in Mo' Better Blues (1990) and Officer Allen in Edward Scissorhands (1990), and his other film credits include Uptight (1968), The Anderson Tapes (1971), Who Killed Mary What's 'Er Name? (1971), Five on the Black Hand Side (1973), Deadly Hero (1975), The Deep (1977), An Almost Perfect Affair (1979), The Jerk (1979), The Night the City Screamed (1980), The Star Chamber (1983), Gardens of Stone (1987), The Players Club (1998), and Blood and Bone (2009).

On television, Williams guest starred in the Season 1 episode of Starsky & Hutch, "Kill Huggy Bear". He played the title character in the Phillip Hayes Dean drama Freeman, broadcast on PBS in October 1977. In the 1978 six-hour NBC docudrama King, about the life of Martin Luther King Jr., Williams played the role of Malcolm X. He guest starred on a number of TV shows including The Rockford Files, Cagney & Lacey, Lou Grant and Hart to Hart. Williams was a regular cast member on the post World War II–era ABC primetime soap opera Homefront (1991-1993), appearing in all 42 episodes as chauffeur Abe Davis. In 1996, he played the father of Larry's assistant Beverley in an episode of The Larry Sanders Show. Williams also starred in the documentary film The Meeting, about Malcolm X and Martin Luther King Jr. discussing the fate of black people in America. In 1971–1972, Williams appeared in Melvin Van Peebles' acclaimed off-Broadway musical Ain't Supposed to Die a Natural Death. One of Williams' co-stars in the production was actress Gloria Edwards, who would later become his wife.

== Awards and nominations ==
Williams won the 1974 Drama Desk Award for his performance in What the Wine-Sellers Buy, for which he was also nominated for a Tony Award, and was nominated in 1975 for both a Tony and a Drama Desk Award for his performance in Black Picture Show.

== Personal life ==
Williams was married twice and had three children. In 1974, he married actress Gloria Edwards and together they had two children; Jason Edward Williams and Mikah Lauren Williams. Williams had a daughter, Mona Williams from a previous marriage. Williams and Edwards were married until Edwards' death in 1988. Williams died of cancer on February 16, 2012, at Valley Presbyterian Hospital in Van Nuys, California.

== Selected filmography ==
- Uptight (1968) – Corbin
- The Lost Man (1969) – Ronald
- The Anderson Tapes (1971) – Spencer
- Who Killed Mary What's 'Er Name? (1971) – Malthus
- The Mack (1973) – Pretty Tony
- Slaughter's Big Rip-Off (1973) – Joe Creole
- Five on the Black Hand Side (1973) – Preston
- Dog Day Afternoon (1975) – Limo Driver
- Deadly Hero (1975) – D.A. Winston
- The Long Night (1976) – Paul
- The Deep (1977) – Slake
- An Almost Perfect Affair (1979) – Andrew Jackson
- The Jerk (1979) – Taj
- Hollow Image (1979) – Danny
- Sister, Sister (1982) – Reverend Richard Henderson
- Grizzly II: The Concert (1983) – Charlie
- Through Naked Eyes (1983) – Det. Wylie
- The Star Chamber (1983) – Det. Paul Mackey
- Summer Rental (1985) – Dan Gardner
- Gardens of Stone (1987) – Slasher Williams
- Tap (1989) – Francis
- Mo' Better Blues (1990) – Big Stop Williams
- Edward Scissorhands (1990) – Officer Allen
- The Rapture (1991) – Henry
- The Gifted (1993) – Daniel
- The Players Club (1998) – Mr. Armstrong
- Virgin Again (2004) – David
- The Stolen Moments of September (2007) – Asa Jamir / Henry Washington
- Steam (2007) – August
- Blood and Bone (2009) – Roberto
