= Who Killed Mary What's 'Er Name? =

1971 film by Ernest Pintoff

- VHS cover
- Directed by: Ernest Pintoff
- Written by: John O'Toole
- Produced by: George Manasse
- Starring: Red Buttons; Sylvia Miles; Alice Playten; Conrad Bain; Sam Waterston; Dick Anthony Williams; David Doyle
- Music by: Gary McFarland
- Distributed by: Cannon Film Distributors
- Release date: November 12, 1971
- Running time: 90 minutes
- Language: English

Who Killed Mary What's 'Er Name? (also known as Death of a Hooker) is a 1971 film directed by Ernest Pintoff and starring comedian and actor Red Buttons and featuring Sylvia Miles, Conrad Bain, Alice Playten and Sam Waterston. Gary McFarland wrote the soundtrack music.

The film was rated PG despite the fact that it dealt with topics including prostitution and murder.

Since its original theatrical release, the film was released only on VHS (distributed by Video Gems in 1982), and is now out of print.

== Plot ==
The plot revolves around the murder of a prostitute in a crime-ridden low-income city neighborhood. Dismayed by the general indifference the police and neighbors show toward the murder, a resident who knew the prostitute sets out to do his own investigation of the case.

== Cast ==
- Red Buttons as Mickey Isador
- Sylvia Miles as Christine
- Alice Playten as Della Isador
- Conrad Bain as Val Rooney
- Dick Anthony Williams as Malthus
- Sam Waterston as Alex Monte
- David Doyle as Roger Boulting
- Gilbert Lewis as Solomon the Cop
- Earl Hindman as Whitey
- Ron Carey as Larry the Bartender
- Leila Martin as Mary

== See also ==
- List of films featuring diabetes
