= Alice Playten =

American actress (1947–2011)

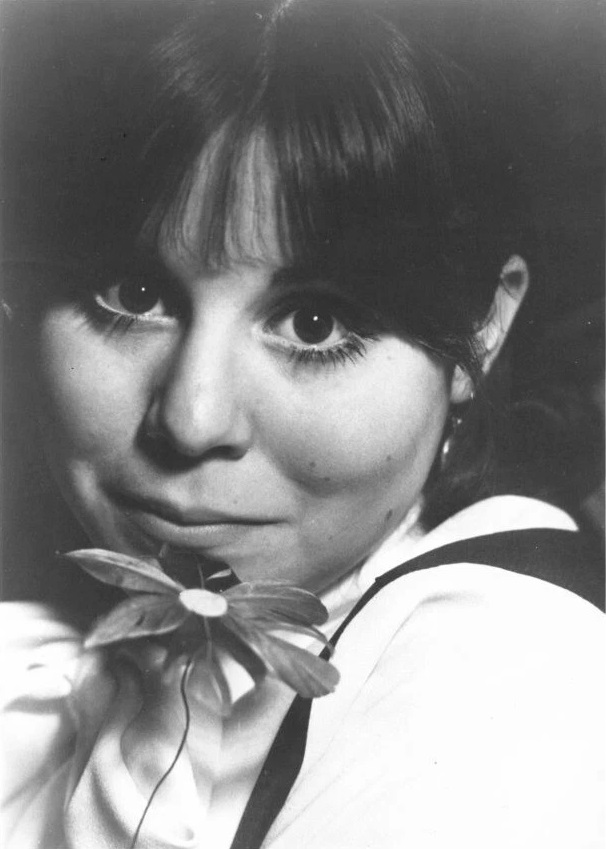
- Playten in 1970
- Born: Alice Plotkin; August 28, 1947; New York City, U.S.
- Died: June 25, 2011 (aged 63); New York City, U.S.
- Occupation: Actress
- Years active: 1959–2009
- Spouse: Joshua White (m. 1982)

Alice Playten (née Plotkin; August 28, 1947 – June 25, 2011) was an American actress known for her high-pitched, child-like voice.

== Life and career ==
Born in New York City, Playten began her career in 1959 at age 11, playing Marie's young son in the Metropolitan Opera's original production of Alban Berg's Wozzeck. Her Broadway credits included Gypsy, Oliver!, Henry, Sweet Henry, Hello, Dolly!, Rumors, Seussical, and Caroline, or Change.

Her many off-Broadway credits include Promenade, The Last Sweet Days of Isaac, Up from Paradise, Sister Mary Ignatius Explains It All for You, First Lady Suite, A Flea in Her Ear, National Lampoon's Lemmings, and Shlemiel the First.

Playten's screen credits include Ladybug Ladybug (1963), Who Killed Mary What's 'Er Name? (1971), California Dreaming (1979), Legend (1985), and I.Q. (1994). She wore heavy makeup and prosthetics in Legend to portray the character of Blix, a major minion of the Lord of Darkness; she also dubbed the voice of Gump. She did voice work in several animated features, including Felix the Cat (as Pearl), Really Rosie (as an alligator), Heavy Metal (as Gloria), Doug (as Beebe Bluff and Elmo), Doug's 1st Movie and My Little Pony: The Movie.

She was a regular on the children's television series The Lost Saucer and That's Cat, appeared in National Lampoon's Disco Beaver from Outer Space during the early days of HBO, and had guest shots on Frasier, Law & Order, Third Watch, and As the World Turns, among others.

Playten may have been best known for her role of the newlywed who makes a gigantic dumpling as the first meal she cooks for her husband (Terry Kiser) in two classic 1969–1970 Alka-Seltzer commercials.

== Personal life and death ==
Playten was married to director Joshua White from no later than July 1982 until her death.

Playten died on June 25, 2011, at Sloan-Kettering Hospital in Manhattan from heart failure after a lifetime of juvenile diabetes, complicated by pancreatic cancer.

== Filmography ==
=== Film ===
Year	Title	Role	Notes
1963	Ladybug Ladybug	Harriet	
1971	Who Killed Mary What's 'Er Name?	Della Isador	
1978	Petronella	Princess / Queen (voice)	
1979	California Dreaming	Corrine	
1981	Heavy Metal	Gloria (voice)	Segment: "So Beautiful and So Dangerous"
1982	Amityville II: The Possession	Deamons' voice (voice)	
1985	Legend	Blix, Gump (voice)	
1986	My Little Pony: The Movie	Baby Lickety-Split (voice)	
1987	The Big Bang	Una (voice)	
1988	Felix the Cat: The Movie	Pearl / Poindexter (voice)	
1993	For Love or Money	Mrs. Prissilla Bailey	
1994	I.Q.	Gretchen	
1996	MURDER and murder	Alice	
1997	The Amazing Feats of Young Hercules	The Gorgon (voice)	Video
1999	Doug's 1st Movie	Beebe Bluff / Elmo (voice)	
1999	Pioneer 12	Mother	
2003	A Very Wompkee Christmas	Buster (voice)	Video
2007	Oy Vey!	Hannah	Short
2009	Hidden Treasure of Wompkee Wood	Buster (voice)	Video
2009	The Rebound	Sensei Dana	Final role

=== Television ===
Year	Title	Role	Notes
1975	The Lost Saucer	Alice	Main role
1975	Really Rosie	Alligator (voice)	TV film
1976	That's Cat	Alice	Main role
1978	Disco Beaver from Outer Space	Various	HBO production
1980	The Pirates of Penzance	Edith Stanley	TV film
1984	Rescue at Midnight Castle	Baby Lickety-Split (voice)	TV film
1985	My Little Pony: Escape from Catrina	Baby Moondancer (voice)	TV film
1991	Monsters	Violet Mitla	"The Moving Finger"
1991–94, 1996–1999	Doug	Beebe Bluff (voice); Elmo (voice); Larry (in "Doug Rocks the House")	Recurring role
1992	Ghostwriter	Parrot (voice)	"Ghost Story: Parts 3 & 5"
1994	The Cosby Mysteries	Oona Dowd	TV film
1997	Remember WENN	Jane Smith (voice)	"Caller I.D."
1998	New York Undercover	Homeless Woman	"Spare Parts"
1999	Frasier	Bonnie	"Our Parents, Ourselves", "Shutout in Seattle: Parts 1 & 2"
2001	Third Watch	Sandy	"The Self-Importance of Being Carlos"
2001	Law & Order	Dog Walker	"Who Let the Dogs Out?"
2001	The Education of Max Bickford	Mrs. Lynch	"A Very Great Man"
2005	As the World Turns	Mrs. Lovejoy	2 episodes
2005	The Buzz on Maggie	Dawn's Lackey (voice)	Episode: Scum Bites
2006	The Book of Daniel	Francesca	"Acceptance", "Assignation"

== Awards and honors ==
- 1968 Tony Award nomination for Best Featured Actress in a Musical (Henry, Sweet Henry)
- 1968 Theatre World Award (Henry, Sweet Henry)
- 1973 Obie Award for Distinguished Performance (National Lampoon's Lemmings)
- 1989 Drama Desk Award nomination for Outstanding Featured Actress in a Play (Spoils of War)
- 1994 Obie Award (First Lady Suite)
