= Ernest Pintoff =

American filmmaker and animator (1931-2002)

- Born: December 15, 1931; Watertown, Connecticut, U.S.
- Died: January 12, 2002 (aged 70); Los Angeles, California, U.S.
- Education: Michigan State University
- Occupations: Film director, television director, animator, film producer, screenwriter, composer

Ernest Pintoff (December 15, 1931 – January 12, 2002) was an American filmmaker, animator, and composer. He won the Academy Award for Best Animated Short Film for The Critic (1963), a satire on modern art written and narrated by Mel Brooks. He was previously nominated for The Violinist (1959). Later in his career, he became a prolific director of television.

== Early life ==
Born in Watertown, Connecticut, but raised in New York City, Pintoff originally began as a jazz trumpeter who taught painting and design at Michigan State University. However, he had always shown an interest in the animation of film and began writing in 1956.

== Career ==
Pintoff's career took off in 1957, when he wrote the script for Flebus, followed by 1959 as a producer and director for the animated short film, The Violinist. Narrated by Carl Reiner, the film earned Pintoff an Oscar nomination and illustrated a promising young career in directing film ahead of him.

In 1964, he won an Oscar for his direction of the 1963 film, The Critic, which was narrated by co-creator Mel Brooks and focused on a man with a grumpy voice trying to understand abstractions he observes.

On television, Pintoff directed many episodes of popular television series, including Hawaii Five-O (1968), Kojak (1968), The Six Million Dollar Man (1974), The Dukes of Hazzard (1979), Falcon Crest (1981) and Voyagers! (1982). As part of NBC's "Experiments in Television" in the late 1960s, he also directed the documentaries This Is Marshall McLuhan and This Is Sholem Aleichem.

Pintoff produced and directed a number of low-budget independent films such as Harvey Middleman, Fireman (1965), Who Killed Mary What's 'Er Name? (1971) and Dynamite Chicken (1972), a film using a collection of old clips from music with appearances by John Lennon, Richard Pryor and Andy Warhol, Nel mirino del giaguaro (1979).

Following his last film in 1985, Pintoff taught directing at the AFI Conservatory, California Institute of the Arts, School of Visual Arts, UCLA, and USC School of Cinematic Arts.

He received the International Animated Film Society's Winsor McCay Award for lifetime contributions to animation in 1998.

== Personal life ==
Pintoff was married to Caroline Pintoff and had two children and three grandchildren.

=== Health issues and death ===
After suffering a stroke in 1985, Pintoff retired from film and turned to writing books, including a memoir, Bolt From the Blue and a novel, Zachary and further books on his love of animation.

His health declined again in 2001 and he died of a stroke in Woodland Hills, Los Angeles on January 12, 2002.

== Filmography ==
=== Film ===
Year	Title	Functioned as				Notes
Year	Title	Director	Writer	Producer	Composer	Notes
1965	Harvey Middleman, Fireman	Yes	Yes	Yes	Yes	
1971	Dynamite Chicken	Yes	Yes	Yes	No	
1971	Who Killed Mary What's 'Er Name?	Yes	No	No	No	
1973	Blade	Yes	Yes	Executive	No	
1979	Jaguar Lives!	Yes	No	No	No	
1981	Lunch Wagon	Yes	No	No	No	

==== Short films ====
Year	Title	Functioned as				Notes
Year	Title	Director	Writer	Producer	Composer	Notes
1957	Flebus	Yes	Yes	No	Yes	
1959	The Violinist	Yes	Yes	Yes	Yes	
1960	The Interview	Yes	No	Yes	No	
1962	The Old Man and The Flower	Yes	Yes	Yes	Yes	
1963	The Critic	Yes	No	Yes	No	

=== Television ===
Year	Title	Notes
1956	The Gerald McBoing-Boing Show	1 episode
1966	Occasional Wife	1 episode
1967–70	NBC Experiment in Television	3 episodes
1975	The Six Million Dollar Man	1 episode
1975	Ellery Queen	2 episodes
1975	Movin' On	1 episode
1975–78	Kojak	4 episodes
1976	Barnaby Jones	1 episode
1976	The Blue Knight	1 episode
1976	Spencer's Pilots	1 episode
1976–78	Hawaii Five-O	5 episodes
1977	Police Woman	1 episode
1977	The Feather & Father Gang	1 episode
1978	James at 15	1 episode
1978	The Bionic Woman	2 episodes
1979	Sweepstakes	1 episode
1979	The White Shadow	1 episode
1979	The Dukes of Hazzard	1 episode
1981	ABC Weekend Special	1 episode
1982	Falcon Crest	1 episode
1982	Code Red	3 episodes
1982	Voyagers!	1 episode
1982–85	Knots Landing	6 episodes
1983	Dallas	1 episode
1984	Emerald Point N.A.S.	2 episodes
1984	Call to Glory	2 episodes
1985	Hell Town	3 episodes
1985	MacGyver	1 episode

==== TV movies and miniseries ====
Year	Title
1977	Bravo Two
1978	Human Feelings
1981	St. Helens

== Awards and nominations ==
Institution	Year	Category	Work	Result
Academy Awards	1960	Best Animated Short Film	The Violinist	Nominated
Academy Awards	1964	Best Animated Short Film	The Critic	Won
Annie Awards	1998	Winsor McCay Award	—N/a	Won
British Academy Film Awards	1960	Best Animated Film	The Violinist	Won
British Academy Film Awards	1961	Best Animated Film	The Interview	Nominated
CINE	1963	Best Animation	The Critic	Won
