= Make a Wish (TV series) =

- Genre: Children's
- Created by: Lester Cooper
- Written by: Lester Cooper
- Directed by: Lester Cooper; Arthur J. Ornitz
- Starring: Tom Chapin
- Composer: Bernard Green
- Country of origin: United States
- Original language: English
- No. of seasons: 5

Production
- Executive producer: Lester Cooper
- Producers: Tom Bywaters; Peter Weinberg
- Running time: 25 mins
- Production company: ABC News

Original release
- Network: ABC
- Release: September 12, 1971 – September 5, 1976

Make a Wish is an American children's television series that ran on ABC from 1971 to 1976. The show was produced by ABC News, hosted by Folk musician Tom Chapin and created and produced by Lester Cooper. It replaced a similar series for children, Discovery, also produced by ABC News.

== Format and content ==
Broadcast on Sunday mornings, each episode of the series focused on a particular theme. One episode, for instance, was about snakes, and another was about motorcycles. Chapin would introduce the topic in much the same manner: "I think a snake is what I'll be. Imagine all the possibilities."

After that, the show featured a free-association presentation on the theme, which featured stock footage, animation, and Chapin's music and voiceover commentary. The quick-cutting, free-association, stream-of-consciousness style of the show caused Chapin, years later during a talk show appearance, to jokingly describe Make a Wish as "a show for six-year-old speed freaks".

The series won a Peabody Award for Best Children's Series in 1971. In 1974, it won an Emmy for Outstanding Informational Children's Series.

Tom's brother, Harry Chapin, wrote songs for Make a Wish, most notably among them was his song "Circle." Bernard Green, who wrote the music to the title song "Make a Wish," was the show's composer. Green has previously served as the composer for Sid Caesar's Your Show of Shows.

In 1976, Make a Wish was replaced with Animals, Animals, Animals which featured much the same frantic visual-overload style, coupled with folk-style songs. Animals, Animals, Animals was also executive produced by Lester Cooper.
