= Discovery (American TV series) =

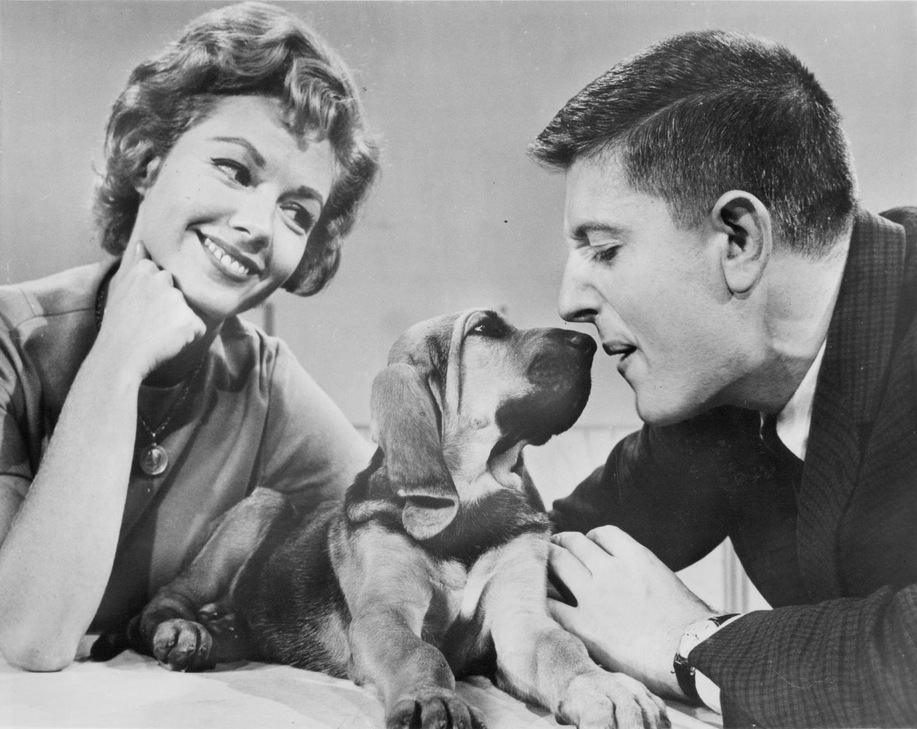
- Virginia Gibson and Frank Buxton with baby bloodhound, Corpuscle, 1962
- Genre: Education; Children's television series
- Country of origin: United States
- Original language: English

Production
- Executive producer: Jules Power
- Production company: ABC

Original release
- Network: ABC
- Release: October 1, 1962 – September 1971

Discovery is an American television program, produced by ABC News, that was geared towards children and teenagers. The program began on October 1, 1962, as a weekday afternoon series. In September 1963, the show was moved to midday Sunday, and remained there until it was canceled in September 1971.

== Overview ==
The program was hosted by actor/announcer Frank Buxton and actress/vocalist Virginia Gibson. The show's original studio announcer was ABC staff announcer Bill Owen, who replaced Buxton as host in 1966, continuing through 1971. The episodes hosted by Buxton were mostly studio productions, videotaped in black-and-white with occasional out of studio segments shot on 16mm film. Beginning with Owen, the episodes were shot in color, and involved much travel to on-site locations around the world. The actual on-air title of the series was named according to each year it was produced, beginning with Discovery '62 and ending with Discovery '71 (syndicated reruns only had the title Discovery).

The show's executive producer was Jules Power, the former co-producer of NBC's Mr. Wizard. The Discovery format originally had Buxton and Gibson (joined by a hound dog named Corpuscle) in studio, exploring various topics in science, culture, history and the arts, often with special in-studio guests. Later seasons of the show had Buxton and Gibson (and later Owen and Gibson, and sometimes either one alone) traveling on location (without Corpuscle) to different destinations around the globe in a documentary format.

Discovery was cancelled in 1971 and replaced by another ABC News production, Make a Wish, which in turn was replaced by Animals, Animals, Animals, broadcast from 1976 to 1981.

== Accolades ==
Discovery was nominated for the Emmy Award for Outstanding Children's Program several times, winning in 1964.
