= WhyHunger =

US non-profit organization

WhyHunger (formerly known as World Hunger Year, or WHY) is a 501(c)(3) organization (non-profit organization) that says it aims to end hunger by providing access to nutritious food both in the U.S. and the world.

== Scope ==
The organization works with more than 8,000 community-based groups across the globe and has worked in 30 countries. These groups aim to help people to help themselves through food production, job-training programs, nutrition education, community economic development, healthcare workshops, youth programming, leadership development and more.

Why Hunger partners with organizations in 25 countries, they helped establish a sustainable farming school in Colombia, and support U.S. food programs, like an urban farm and co-op in Detroit.

== History ==
Founded in September 1975 by musician Harry Chapin and radio host Bill Ayres, WhyHunger began as a commitment between two friends and has grown into a global non-profit. Harry Chapin served as the chair of President Jimmy Carter's Commission on World Hunger. After Harry Chapin died in a car crash in 1981, family, friends, fans and the music community worked to ensure that WhyHunger lived on. Today, Jenique Jones serves as WhyHunger's executive director. Harry's brother Tom Chapin sits on the board of directors, his brother Steve Chapin sits on the advisory board.
