= Bill Ayres =

American talk radio host (1941–2026)

- Born: January 14, 1941
- Died: August 22, 2026 (aged 85)
- Occupations: Radio host and philanthropist
- Years active: 1966–2026

Bill Ayres (January 14, 1941 – August 22, 2026) was an American talk radio host and executive director and co-founder of World Hunger Year.

== Life and career ==
Ayres became a Catholic priest for the Roman Catholic diocese of Rockville Centre. Long Island, New York in 1966, but always had a fondness for radio broadcasting, starting at WGSM on Long Island. He began hosting and producing a weekly radio talk show on New York radio station WPLJ 95.5 FM in 1973. At first called On This Rock, it featured interviews with rock musicians, that focused on the spiritual meaning of the music to them, rather than its commercial aspects. Known on-air as Father Bill Ayres, hosting The Bill Ayres Show, he took thousands of calls and offered advice about personal, relational, spiritual, and social values, as well as playing music by artists whose outlook he thought was similar to his.

He served for ten years at St. James Church in Seaford, New York, until 1979. He resigned from the active priesthood in the early 1980s and focused on charitable work full-time. His motivation to leave the priesthood was to be able to marry his wife Jeannine. They raised two daughters while residing in Huntington Station, New York.

In 1975, Ayres and his close friend folksinger and songwriter Harry Chapin saw a pressing need to help the impoverished with basic needs such as food. They began World Hunger Year (WHY, later known as WhyHunger), an organization with a stated mission to defeat hunger through charity, using grassroots efforts and rallying celebrities and leaders to help promote the cause. Ayres began serving as executive director in 1983. Ayres and Chapin believed that solutions to hunger and poverty are found through long-term solutions, like supporting community-based organizations that empower individuals and build self-reliance.

Ayres also spun off another national hunger coalition, the Medford Group of national hunger organizations. He was a founding member of the National Jobs for All Coalition, a full-employment group. He suggested their series, Uncommon Sense, and was on their advisory board. He was also a board member of Long Island Cares, Long Island's food bank. He and his wife founded the life counseling group At the Water's Edge on Long Island.

He co-authored the book All You Need is Love: And 99 Other Life Lessons From Classic Rock Songs with radio colleague Pete Fornatale. His next book, The Journey Into the Mystery: Finding God in Your Everyday Life, was released on Amazon marketplace in 2021.

On June 23, 2015, Ayres was presented with the "WhyHunger Lifetime Achievement Award" by WhyHunger.

Ayres died on August 22, 2026, at the age of 85.
