= Cornell (name) =

Cornell is an English surname and given derived from a shortened form of Cornwall, Cornwell or Cornhill, and also a Dutch surname. Sometimes the name is an Americanized form of the Czech Kornel or the German and Swedish Kornell. In Dutch, and sometimes in English, the name derives from the Latin gens Cornelia, one of the most famous tribes in ancient republican Rome, to whom Publio Cornelio Scipio belonged. The name of the tribe survives in Italy as Corneli or Cornelli.

== Surname ==
- Alonzo B. Cornell (1832–1904), American businessman and Governor of New York
- Bo Cornell (born 1949), American football player
- Brian Cornell (born 1960), American businessman
- Butch Cornell (1941–2008), American jazz organist
- Charles Cornell (1911–1989), American Communist
- Charles G. Cornell (1827–1906), New York politician
- Chris Cornell (1964–2017), American musician
- David Cornell (born 1991), Welsh footballer
- Dewey Cornell, American psychologist
- Don Cornell (1919–2004), American singer
- Ellie Cornell, American actress and producer
- Eric Allin Cornell (born 1961), American physicist
- Erik Cornell (1930–2024), Swedish diplomat
- Ezekiel Cornell (1732–1800), American delegate from Rhode Island to the Continental Congress
- Ezra Cornell (1807–1874), American businessman and co-founder of Cornell University
- Francis R. E. Cornell (1821–1881), American lawyer, politician, and judge
- George Cornell (1927–1966), English criminal and murder victim
- George Cornell (politician) (1910–1967), Australian politician
- George W. Cornell (1896–1988), New York politician
- Isabella Aiukli Cornell, Choctaw activist
- James Cornell (1874–1946), Australian politician
- Jaraan Cornell (1976–2025), American basketball player
- Jashon Cornell (born 1997), American football player
- Jeff Cornell (born 1957), American baseball player
- John Cornell (1941–2021), Australian actor and producer
- Joseph Cornell (1903–1972), American artist
- Joseph Bharat Cornell (born 1950), American nature educator
- Judy Cornell (1933–2021), American swimmer
- Julien Davies Cornell (1910–1994), American lawyer and pacifist who defended Ezra Pound
- Katharine Cornell (1892–1974), American stage actress
- Lillian Cornell (1916–2015), American singer and actress
- Lorna Cornell (born 1933), British tennis player
- Lauren Cornell, American curator and writer
- Lyn Cornell (born 1940), English pop and jazz singer
- Mark Cornell (born 1966), British businessman
- Mark Cornell (cricketer) (born 1939), South African cricketer
- Pamela Cornell (1928–1987), British set decorator
- Patricia Cornell, American politician
- Patrick Cornell (1932–2020), South African cricketer
- Paul Cornell (born 1967), British writer
- Paul Cornell (lawyer) (1822–1904), American lawyer and real estate speculator
- Peter Cornell, multiple people
- Ralph D. Cornell (1890–1972), American landscape architect from Los Angeles, California
- Reggie Cornell (1922–1979), Canadian horse racing trainer
- Richard Cornell (1625–1693), English Quaker ironmaster
- Rick Cornell (born 1969), American professional wrestler
- Robert John Cornell (1919–2009), American priest and politician representing Wisconsin in the House of Representatives
- Roy Cornell (1943–2004), Pennsylvania politician
- Sarah Cornell (actress), Canadian actress
- Sarah Maria Cornell (1803–1832), victim in the murder trial of Methodist minister Ephraim Kingsbury Avery
- Susan Cornell (born 1971), Pennsylvania politician
- Thomas Cornell (disambiguation), several people
- Toni Cornell (born 2004), American singer, songwriter, and philanthropist
- Vincent Cornell, American scholar of Islam
- Ward Cornell (1924–2000), Canadian broadcaster and educator

== Given name ==
- Cornell Armstrong (born 1995), American football player
- Cornell Babendererde (born 1971), German politician
- Cornell Borchers (1925–2014), Lithuanian-German actress and singer
- Cornell William Brooks (born 1961), American lawyer and activist
- Cornell Campbell (born 1945), Jamaican reggae singer
- Cornell Capa (1918–2008), Hungarian-American photographer
- Cornell Dupree (1942–2011), American R&B/soul jazz guitarist
- Cornell N. Dypski (1931–2009), American politician
- Cornell Glen (born 1981), Trinidadian footballer
- Cornell Gordon (born 1941), American football player
- Cornell Gowdy (born 1963), American football player
- Cornell Green, multiple people
- Cornell Gunter (1936–1990), American rhythm and blues singer
- Cornell Haynes Jr. (born 1974), American rapper, best known as Nelly
- Cornell Holloway (born 1966), American football player
- Cornell John (born 1963), British actor
- Cornell Krieger, American soccer player
- Cornell Loubser (born 1994), South African deaf swimmer
- Cornell Moss (1959–2015), Barbadian Anglican bishop
- Cornell Powell (born 1997), American football player
- Cornell Webster (1954–2022), American football player

== See also ==
- Cornell (disambiguation)
- Cornel (given name)
