= Cornea (disambiguation) =

The cornea is a part of the eye.

Cornea may also refer to:

- Cornea (surname)
- Cornea, a tributary of the Buda in Argeș County, Romania
- Cornea, Caraș-Severin, a commune in Caraș-Severin County, Romania

== See also ==
- Cornel (disambiguation)
- Cornelia (disambiguation)
- Cornu (disambiguation)
- Corni (disambiguation)
- Cornetu (disambiguation)
- Cornățel (disambiguation)
- Cornești (disambiguation)
- Corneanu (disambiguation)
