= Cornești =

Cornești may refer to several places:

== Romania ==
- Cornești, Cluj, a commune in Cluj County
- Cornești, Dâmbovița, a commune in Dâmbovița County
- Cornești, a village in Filipești Commune, Bacău County
- Cornești, a village in Gârbău Commune, Cluj County
- Cornești, a village in Mihai Viteazu Commune, Cluj County
- Cornești, a village in Bălești Commune, Gorj County
- Cornești, a village in Miroslava Commune, Iași County
- Cornești, a village in Călinești Commune, Maramureș County
- Cornești, a village in Adămuș Commune, Mureș County
- Cornești, a village in Crăciunești Commune, Mureș County
- Cornești, a village in Orțișoara Commune, Timiș County
- Cornești, a tributary of the river Prut in Botoșani County

== Moldova ==
- Cornești (town), Ungheni, a town (oraș) in Ungheni district
- Cornești (village), Ungheni, a village (sat) in Ungheni district
- Cornești, a village in Secăreni Commune, Hîncești district
- Cornești Hills, on the Moldavian Plateau

== Ukraine ==
- Cornești, the Romanian name for Korneshty village, Rukhotyn, Chernivtsi Oblast

== See also ==
- Cornel (disambiguation)
- Cornelia (disambiguation)
- Cornu (disambiguation)
- Corni (disambiguation)
- Cornea (disambiguation)
- Cornetu (disambiguation)
- Cornățel (disambiguation)
- Corneanu (disambiguation)
