= Cornățel =

Cornățel or Cornatel may refer to:

- Cornățel, a village in Buzoești Commune, Argeș County, Romania
- Cornățel, a village in Urechești Commune, Bacău County, Romania
- Cornățel, a village in Roșia Commune, Sibiu County, Romania
- Cornățel, a former village in Sâncraiu de Mureș Commune, Mureș County, Romania
- Cornatel, a town in the municipality of Priaranza del Bierzo, Spain
  - Castillo de Cornatel, a castle in the region

== See also ==
- Cornățelu, a commune in Dâmbovița County, Romania
- Cornea (disambiguation)
- Corneanu (disambiguation)
- Cornel (disambiguation)
- Cornelia (disambiguation)
- Cornești (disambiguation)
- Cornetu (disambiguation)
- Corni (disambiguation)
- Cornu (disambiguation)
