= Cornu (surname) =

Cornu is a surname. Notable people with the surname include:

- Alain Cornu (1936–2025), French footballer
- Auguste Cornu (1888–1981), French Marxist philosopher and historian of philosophy
- Aurora Cornu (1931–2021), Romanian writer and actress
- Dominique Cornu (born 1985), Belgian road and track cyclist
- Francis Cornu (1794–1848), French playwright
- Geoffrey Cornu (1913–2007), English cricketer
- Gérard Cornu (born 1952), French politician
- Hortense Cornu (1809–1875), French socialite
- Jacques Cornu (1953–2026), Swiss motorcycle racer
- Jean Cornu (1650–1710/1715), French sculptor
- Jean-Claude Cornu (1938–2023), French sailor
- Jérémy Cornu (born 1991), French cyclist
- Jo Cornu (born 1944), Belgian engineer and business executive
- Manuel Cornu, French rock climber
- Marie Alfred Cornu (1841–1902), French physicist for whom the Cornu spiral (also known as the Euler spiral) is named
- Marie Maxime Cornu (1843–1901), French botanist and mycologist
- Paul Cornu (1881–1944), French engineer sometimes credited as the creator of the first helicopter
- René Cornu (1929–1986), French swimmer
- Sébastien-Melchior Cornu (1804–1870), French painter

== See also ==
- Cornu (disambiguation)
