= Corneanu =

Corneanu is a Romanian surname that may refer to:

- Nicolae Corneanu (1923 - 2014), a Romanian metropolitan bishop of the Romanian Orthodox Church
- Leonid Corneanu (1909 - 1957), a Moldovan poet, playwright and folklorist
- Corneanu, a village in Odăile Commune, Buzău County, Romania

== See also ==
- Cornel (disambiguation)
- Cornelia (disambiguation)
- Cornu (disambiguation)
- Corni (disambiguation)
- Cornea (disambiguation)
- Cornetu (disambiguation)
- Cornățel (disambiguation)
- Cornești (disambiguation)
