= Cornell (disambiguation) =

Cornell University is an Ivy League university in Ithaca, New York, United States.

Cornell may also refer to:

== Places ==
=== Canada ===
- Cornell, Markham, Ontario

=== United States ===
- Cornell, Los Angeles County, California
- Cornell, Illinois
- Cornell, Iowa
- Cornell, Wisconsin
- Cornell Township, Michigan

== Schools ==
=== United States ===
- Cornell College, Iowa, a liberal arts college
- Cornell School District (Allegheny County, Pennsylvania), a public school district
- Cornell School District (Cornell, Wisconsin), a public school district
  - Cornell Elementary School
- Cornell School (Alexandria, Ohio), a former one-room schoolhouse

=== Canada ===
- Cornell Village Public School, a public elementary school in Markham, Ontario

== Transportation and municipal services ==
- Cornell Terminal, bus terminal in Markham, Ontario

== Other uses ==
- Cornell (name), including a list of persons with the surname or given name
- The Cornells, a musical group
- Cornell Big Red, the athletic program of Cornell University
- Cornell Lab of Ornithology, a unit of Cornell University
- Cornell Box, a rendering software accuracy test
- Cornell Companies, a corrections services company
- Cornell Notes, a note-taking system
- Cornell Prize, a former art prize awarded in Australia
- Fairchild Cornell, an aircraft
- William Cornell Homestead, historic home in DeKalb County, Indiana.
- Cornell, a character in the Castlevania series

== See also ==
- Cornel (disambiguation)
- Justice Cornell (disambiguation)
- Cornelius (name)
