= Corni =

Corni may refer to:

== Places in Romania ==
- Corni, Botoșani
- Corni, Galați
- Corni, a village in Cornățelu Commune, Dâmboviţa County
- Corni, a village in Bicaz Commune, Maramureș County
- Corni, a village in Bodești Commune, Neamţ County
- Corni, a district in Liteni town, Suceava County
- Cornii de Jos and Cornii de Sus, villages in Tătărăști Commune, Bacău County
- Corni, a tributary of the river Bistra in Caraș-Severin County

== Other ==
- Corni, the archaic Italian plural term for the French horn
- Guido Corni (1883–1946), colonial governor of Italian Somaliland

== See also ==
- Cornel (disambiguation)
- Cornelia (disambiguation)
- Cornu (disambiguation)
- Cornea (disambiguation)
- Cornetu (disambiguation)
- Cornățel (disambiguation)
- Cornești (disambiguation)
- Corneanu (disambiguation)
