= Cornetu (disambiguation) =

Cornetu may refer to the following places in Romania:

- Cornetu, a commune in Ilfov County
- Cornetu, a village in Șimnicu de Sus Commune, Dolj County
- Cornetu, a village in Căpreni Commune, Gorj County
- Cornetu, a village in Vaideeni Commune, Vâlcea County
- Cornetu, a village in Slobozia Bradului Commune, Vrancea County
- Cornetu River

== See also ==
- Cornel (disambiguation)
- Cornelia (disambiguation)
- Cornu (disambiguation)
- Corni (disambiguation)
- Cornea (disambiguation)
- Cornățel (disambiguation)
- Cornești (disambiguation)
- Corneanu (disambiguation)
