= Le Cornu =

Le Cornu is a surname of French origin, later strongly associated with Jersey in the Channel Islands.

== Variants and history ==
The name Le Cornu is of French origin, and in particular from Calvados and the area around Bayeux.

The name has a number of variants, including "Cornu", "Lecornue", "Lecornu" and "Cornut". Tosti comments that it was "a name that some bearers found difficult to wear as it immediately and incontrovertibly evoked a horned person, or a cuckold". However, this has been challenged by M.T. Morlet who comments that this identification of horns with a husband who has been cheated on only came into being at the end of the Middle Ages. The discussion continues, although Tosti accepts Dauzat's view that the idea of a cuckold is found from the 13th century onwards and that "it is this interpretation which will undoubtedly stand the test of time".

The variant "Lecorne" is found in the Nord-Pas-de-Calais (Hauts de France) area of France where a feminine form "Lacorne" is also found. In this case, while also carrying the meaning of "horned person" it is understood to refer to a horn or trumpet player, which in turn indicates a rather naive individual.

From the 15th century onwards, it has been a common surname in the Channel Islands, most notably in Jersey, where it remains strongly identified with the island. Possibly the oldest record of a Le Cornu family in Jersey is that of Jean Le Cornu (1480-?).

== People with the surname ==
Notable people with the surname include:

- Craig Le Cornu (born 1960), English football player
- Léon Lecornu (1854–1940), French engineer and physicist
- Patrice Lecornu (1958–2023), French football player
- Phillip Le Cornu (1836–1921), early settler in South Australia from Jersey, who founded a furniture business called Le Cornu, buried in Walkerville Cemetery, Adelaide
- Sébastien Lecornu (born 1986), French politician and prime minister

== See also ==
- Ogier & Le Cornu, a law firm merged into the Ogier Group
- Cornu (disambiguation)
