= Musée des Beaux-Arts de Rouen =

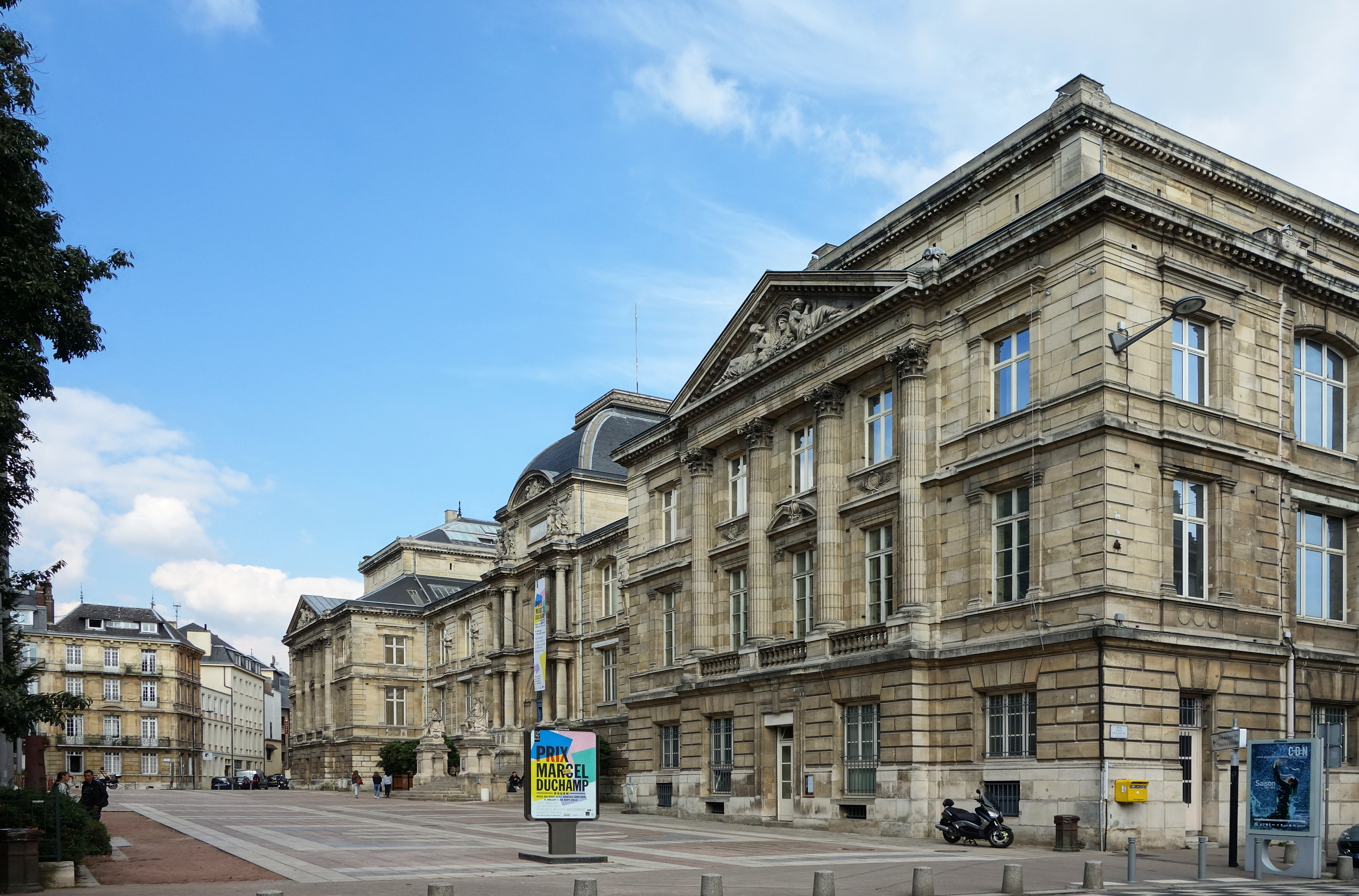
- The Musée des Beaux-Arts de Rouen
- Established: 1801
- Location: Esplanade Marcel-Duchamp; 76000 Rouen, Normandy, France
- Coordinates: 49.444722°N 1.094722°E
- Type: Art museum
- Visitors: 217,381 (2025)
- Curator: Robert Blaizeau
- Website: mbarouen.fr

The Musée des Beaux-Arts de Rouen (French pronunciation: [myze de boz‿aʁ də ʁwɑ̃]) is an art museum in Rouen, in Normandy in north-western France. It was established by Napoléon Bonaparte in 1801, and is housed in a building designed by Louis Sauvageot and built between 1877, and 1888. Its collections include paintings, sculptures, drawings and objets d'art.

== History ==
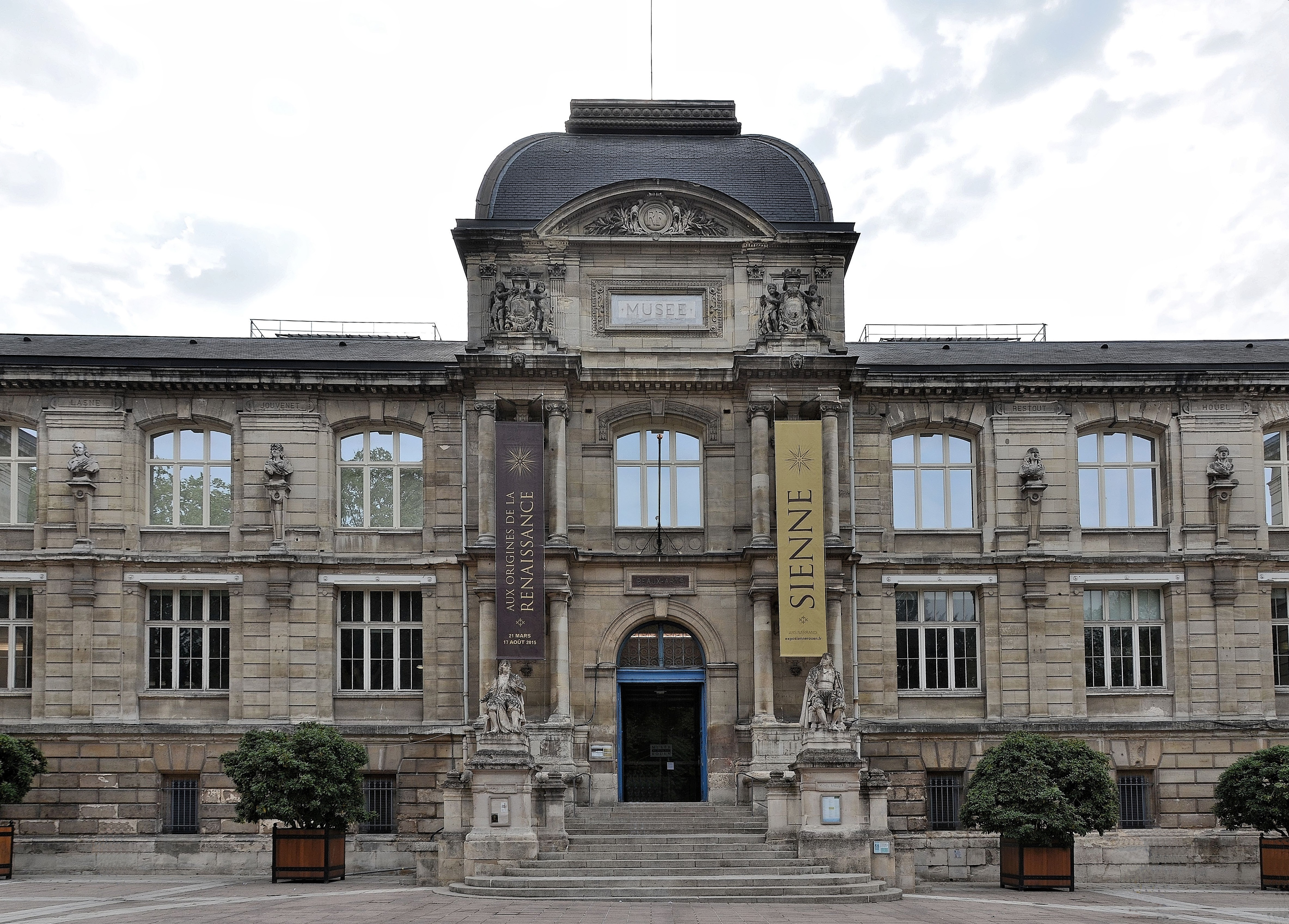
Main façade of the Museum

The museum was established by Napoléon Bonaparte in 1801. The museum building was built between 1877, and 1888 to designs by Louis Sauvageot. The collections include paintings, sculptures, drawings and objets d'art from the Renaissance to the present day, including a collection of Russian icons dating from the fifteenth to the early nineteenth century, and some 8000 drawings. The Depeaux collection of Impressionist works was donated to the museum in 1909.

The Rouen Museum of Fine Arts is one of the main regional museums in France6. It is located in the heart of the city, opposite Square Verdrel, in a building whose complete renovation was completed in 1994.

In addition to the presentation of its collections, the Museum of Fine Arts organizes several exhibitions a year. Some have an international impact and contribute to its reputation. In 2006, for example, the museum, having presented eight temporary exhibitions, among which the "Masterpieces of the Museums of Florence", increased the number of visitors from 87,000 to 154,000. The Normandie impressionniste festival, the exhibition "A city for impressionism: Monet, Pissarro and Gauguin in Rouen" attracted 240,000 visitors, which made it the highlight of the festival.

== Paintings ==
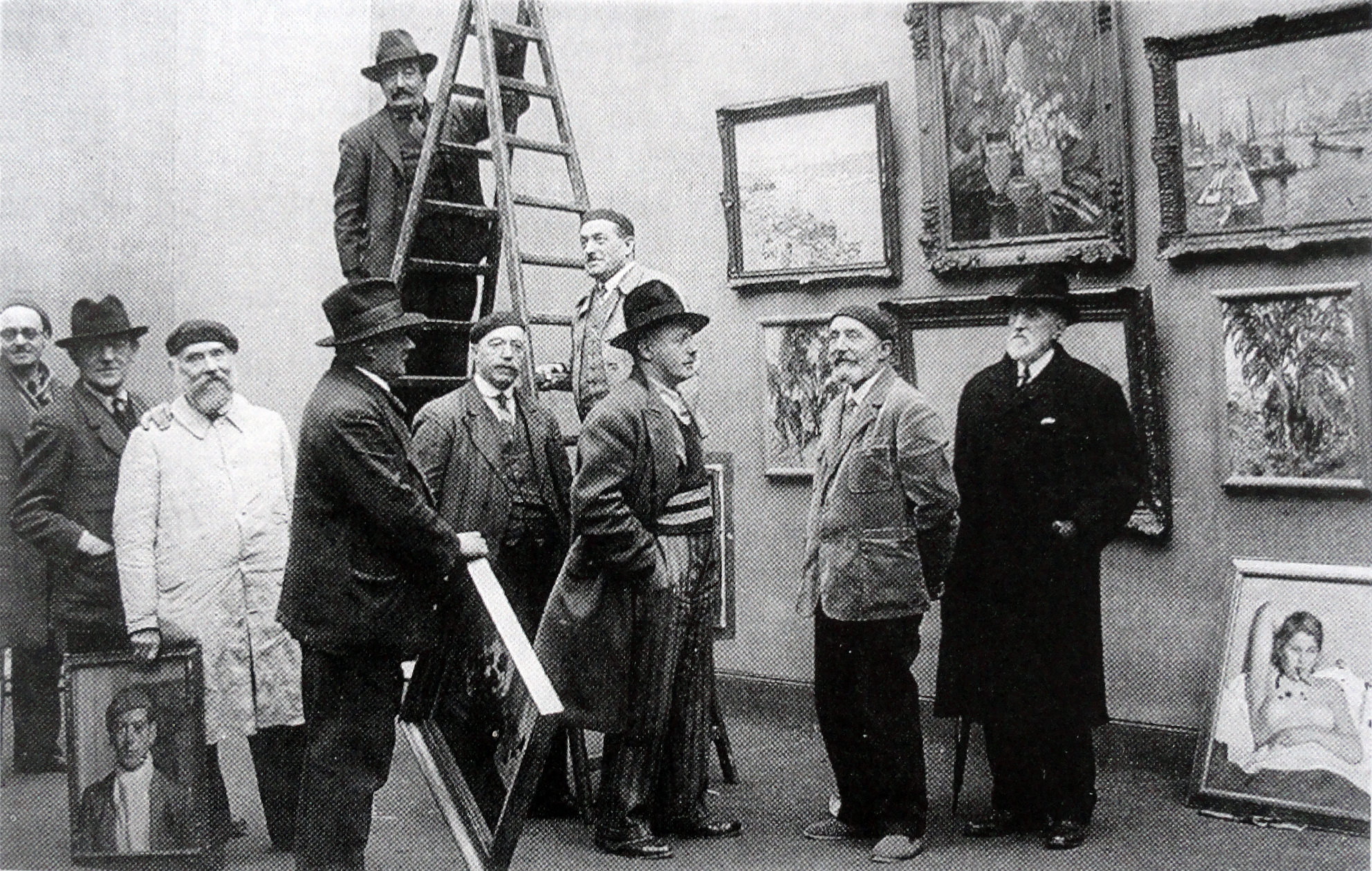
Members of the Rouen School, Salon des Artistes Rouennais, musée des Beaux-Arts de Rouen, Robert Antoine Pinchon (centre), 1934

The museum holds paintings of several European schools from the sixteenth century to the present day. Among them is work by:

- sixteenth century: Jacopo Bassano, Annibale Carracci, François Clouet, Gerard David, Perugino and Veronese
- seventeenth century: Caravaggio, Philippe de Champaigne, Van Dyck, Luca Giordano, Guercino, Laurent de La Hyre, Pierre Mignard, Nicolas Poussin, Jusepe de Ribera, Rubens, Eustache Le Sueur, Diego Velázquez, Simon Vouet and John Michael Wright.
- eighteenth century: François Boucher, Fragonard, Francesco Guardi, Élisabeth Vigée Le Brun, Pietro Longhi, Hyacinthe Rigaud and Hubert Robert.
- nineteenth century: Gustave Caillebotte, Eugène Carrière, Corot, Édouard Joseph Dantan, Jacques-Louis David, Degas, Delacroix, Géricault, Ingres, Monet, Gustave Moreau, Camille Pissarro, Renoir and Sisley
- twentieth century: André Derain, Jean Dubuffet, Marcel Duchamp, Raoul Dufy, Amedeo Modigliani, Robert Antoine Pinchon, Jacques Villon and Édouard Vuillard.

== Selected works ==
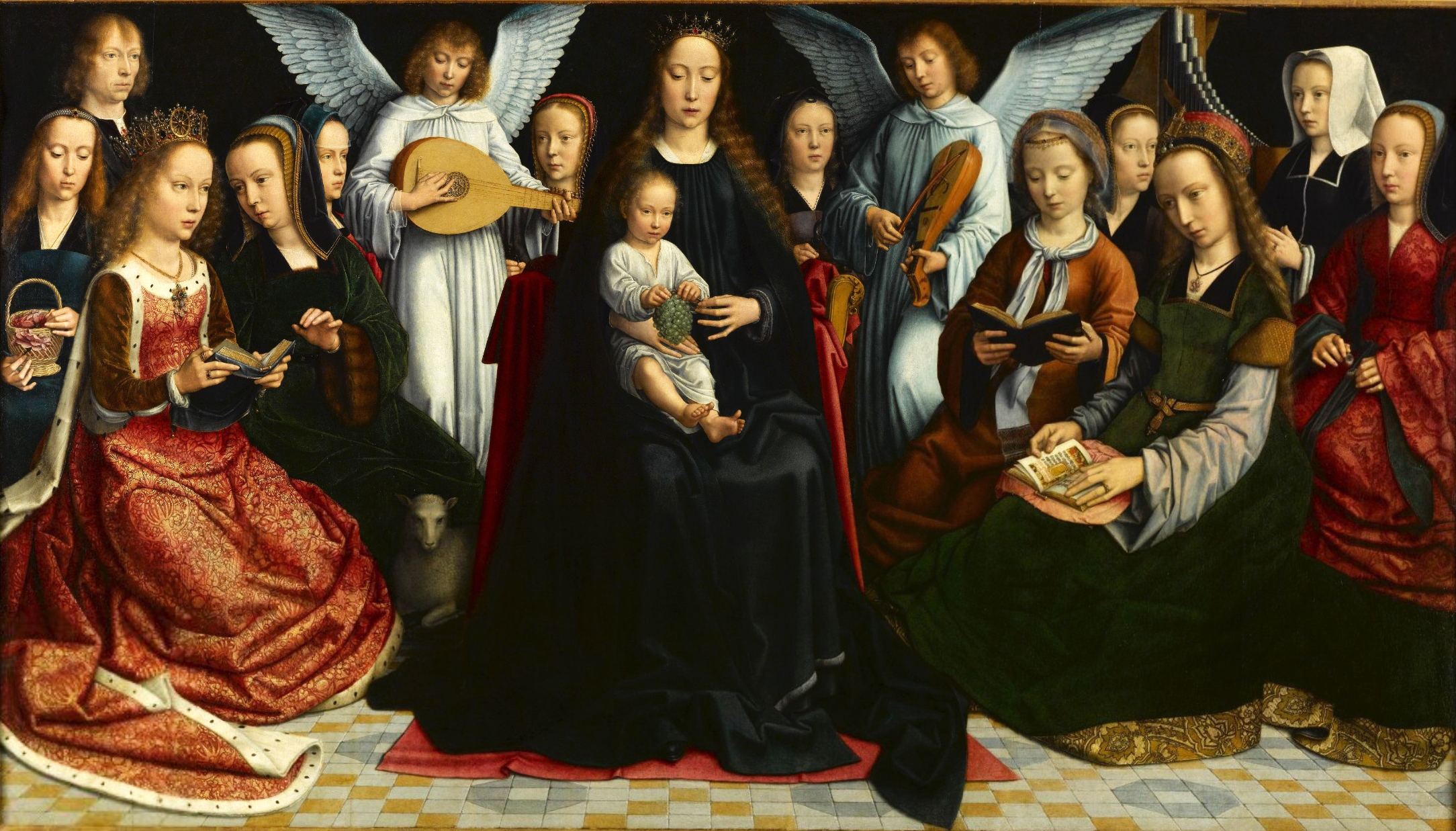
Gerard David, The Virgin among the Virgins

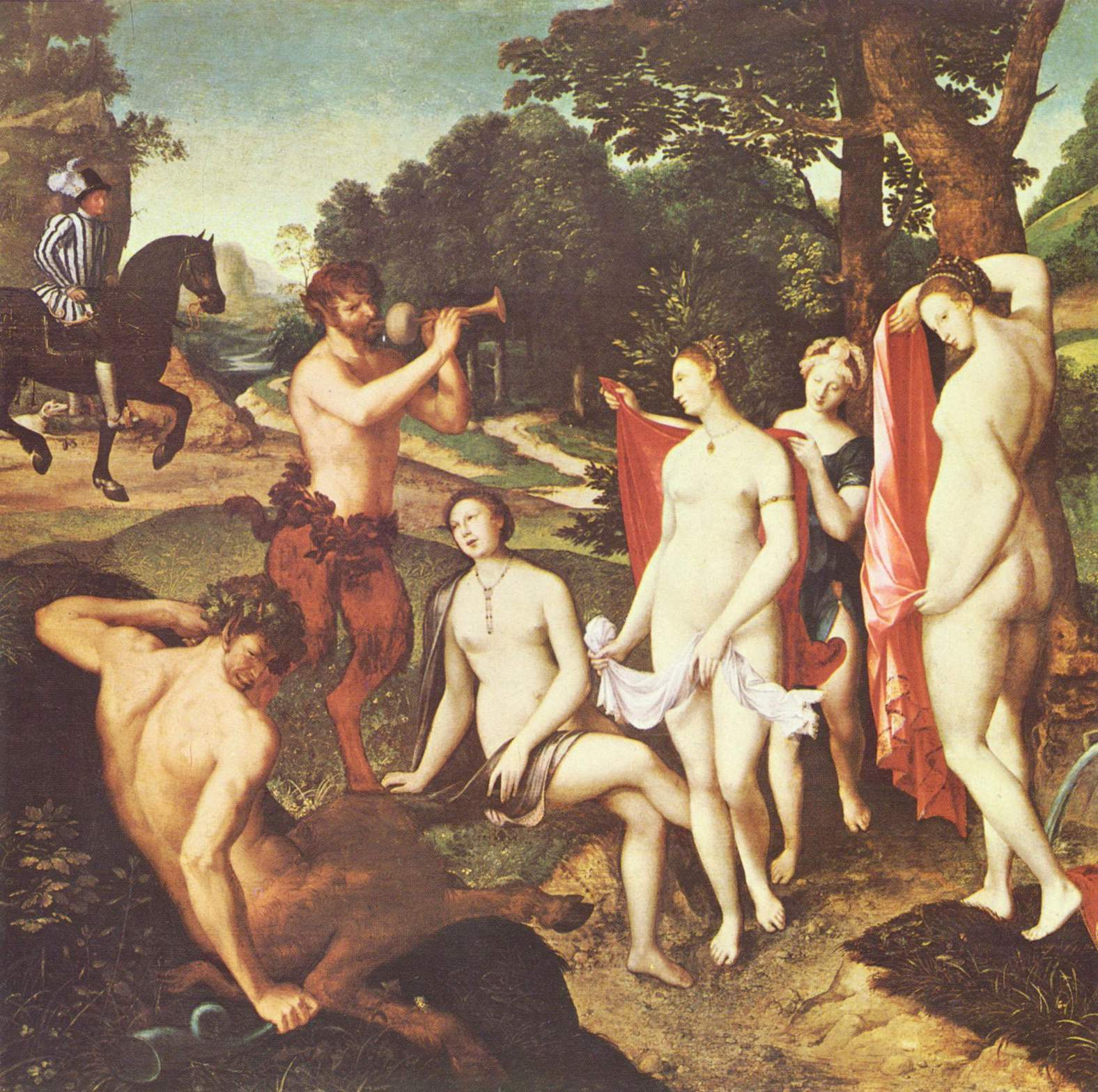
François Clouet, Diana bathing

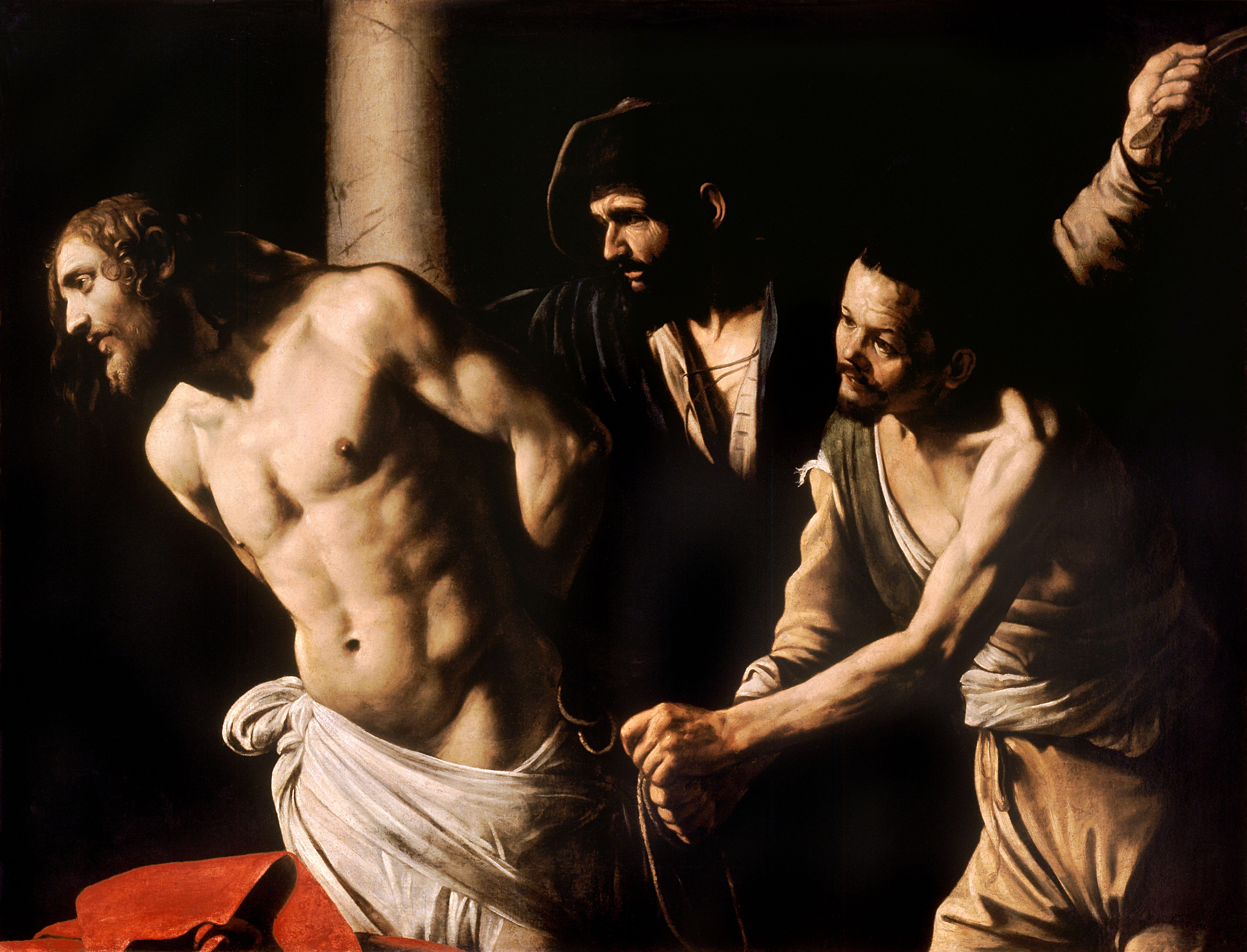
Caravaggio, Christ at the Column

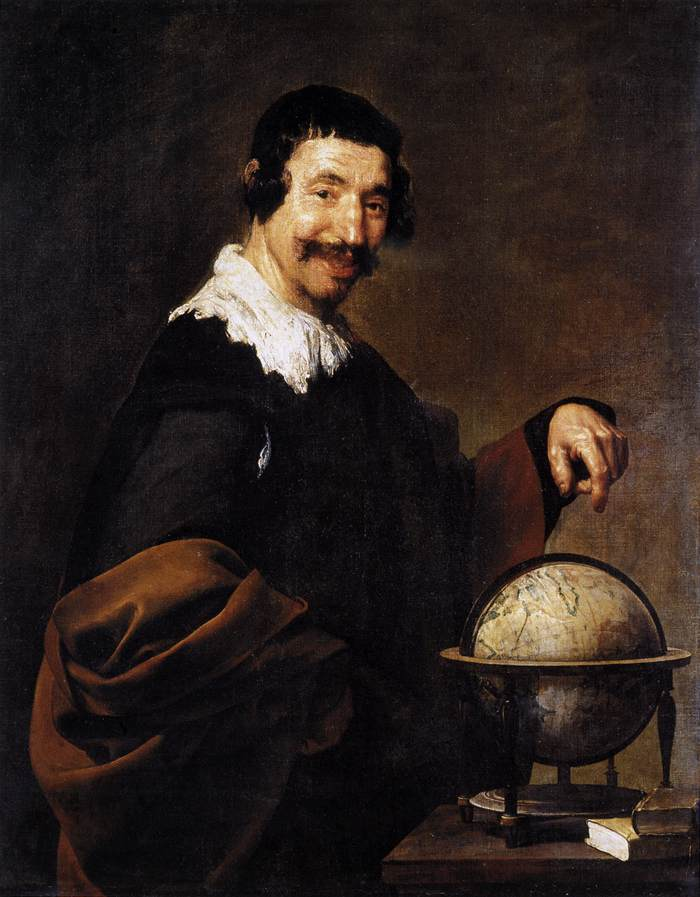
Diego Velázquez, Democritus

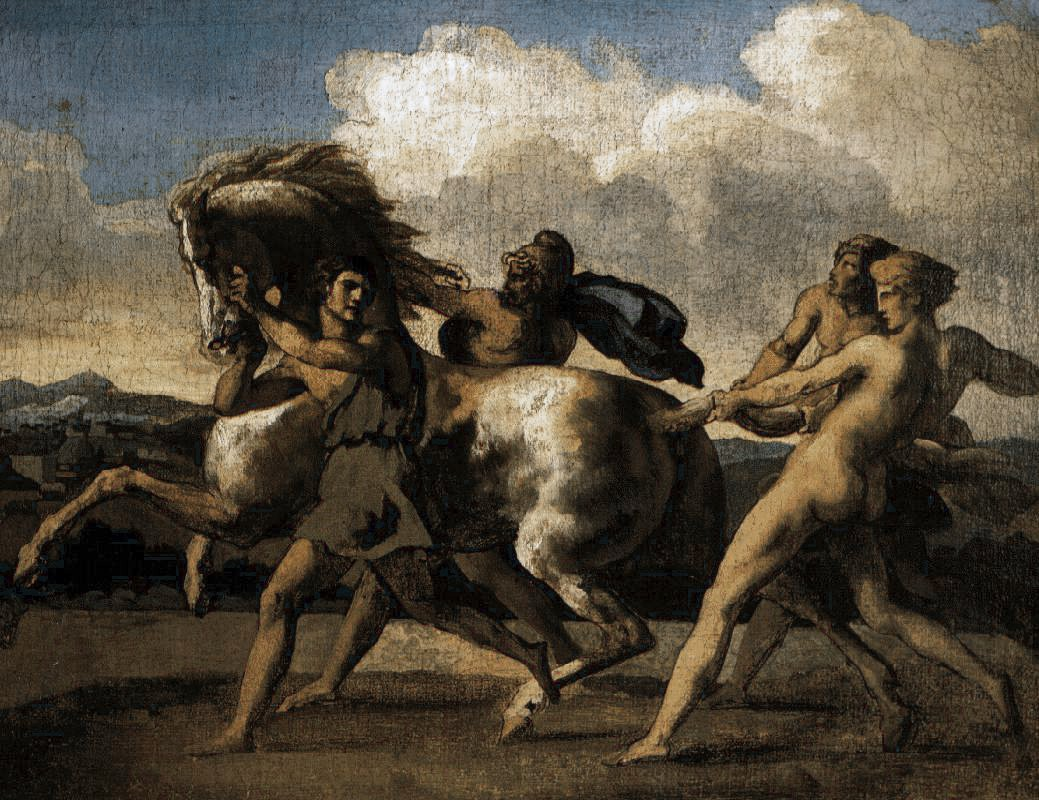
Théodore Géricault, Capture of a horse

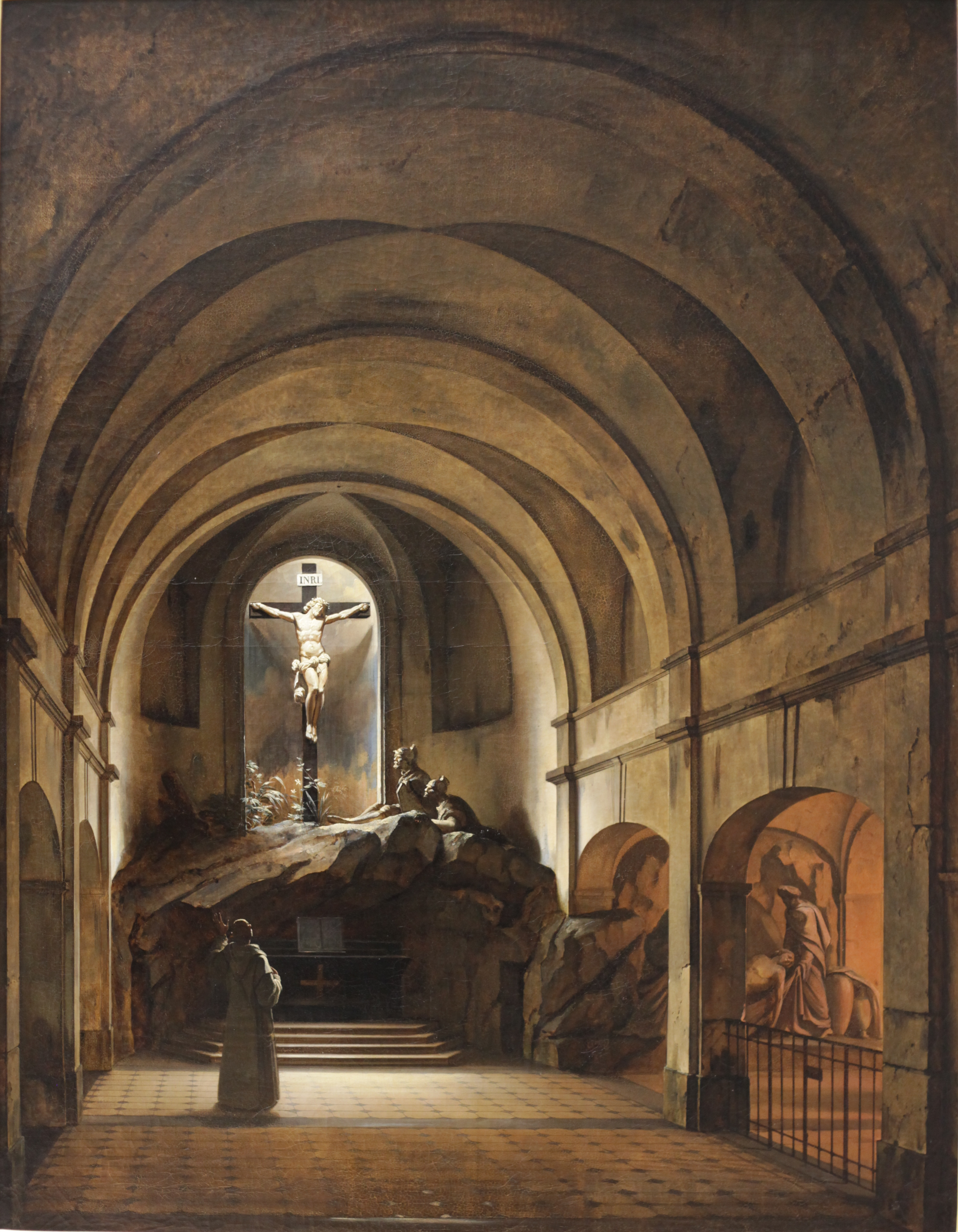
Charles Marie Bouton, Chapelle du Calvaire dans l'église Saint-Roch

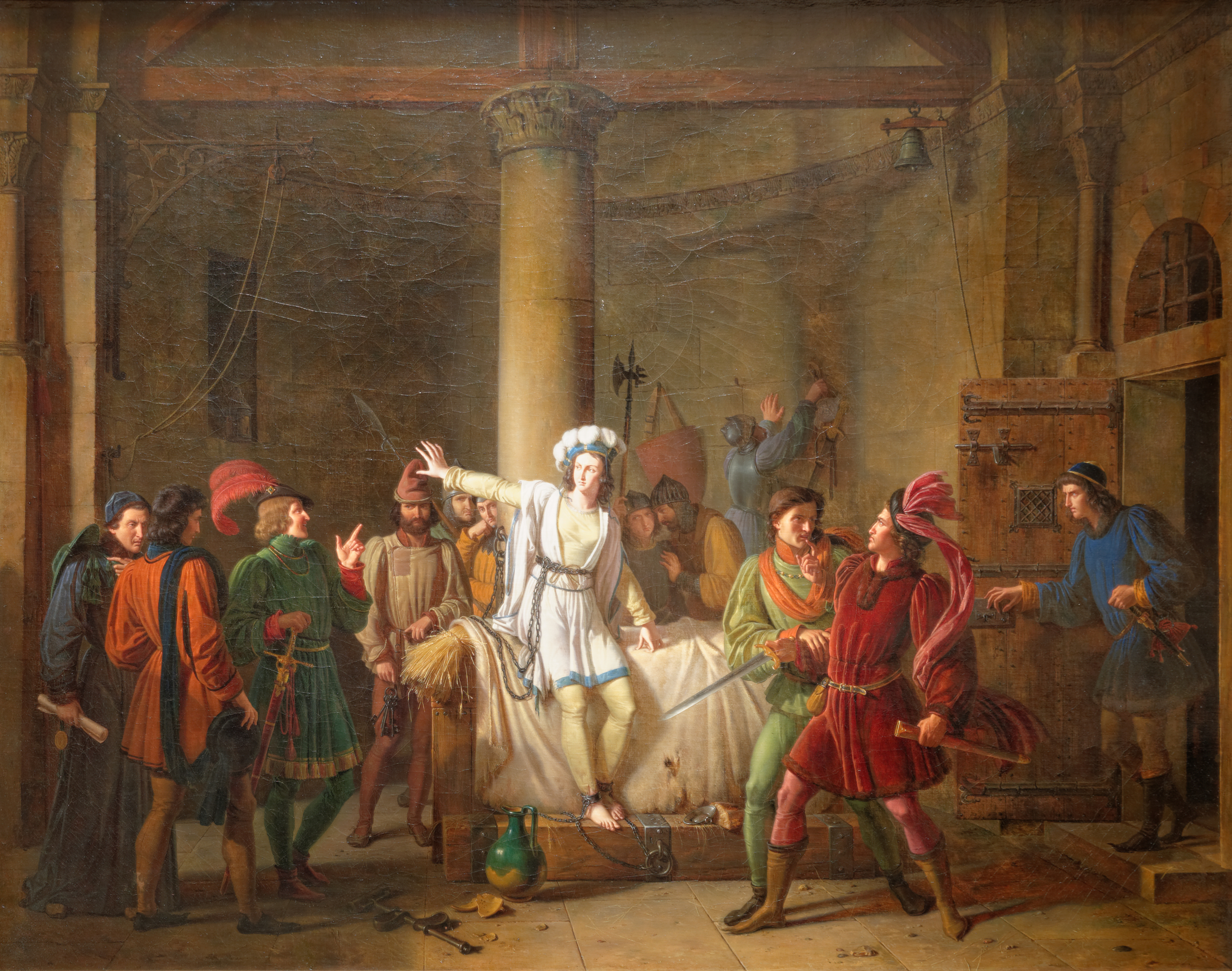
Joan of Arc Imprisoned in Rouen by Pierre Révoil, 1819

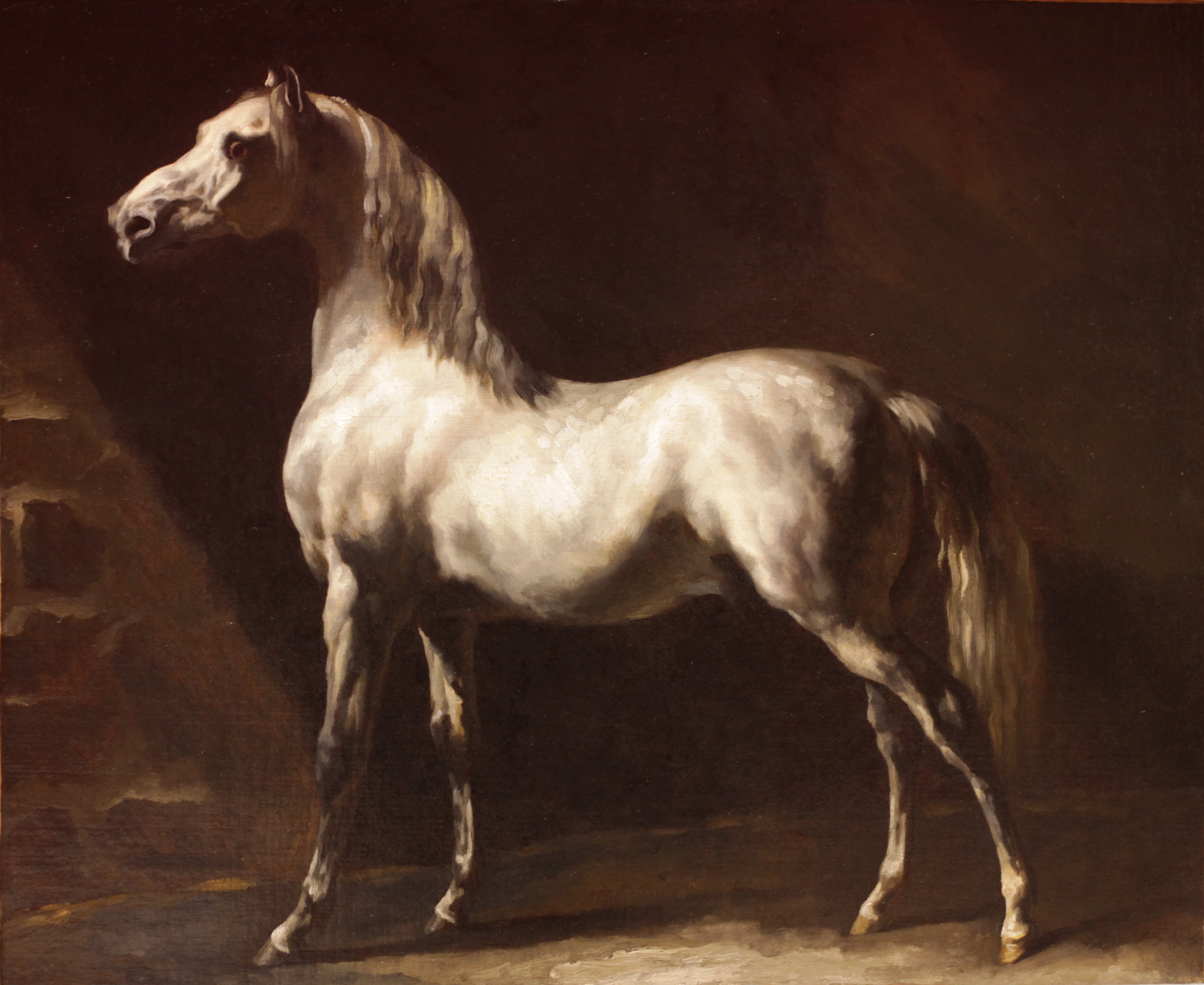
Théodore Géricault, Cheval arabe gris-blanc

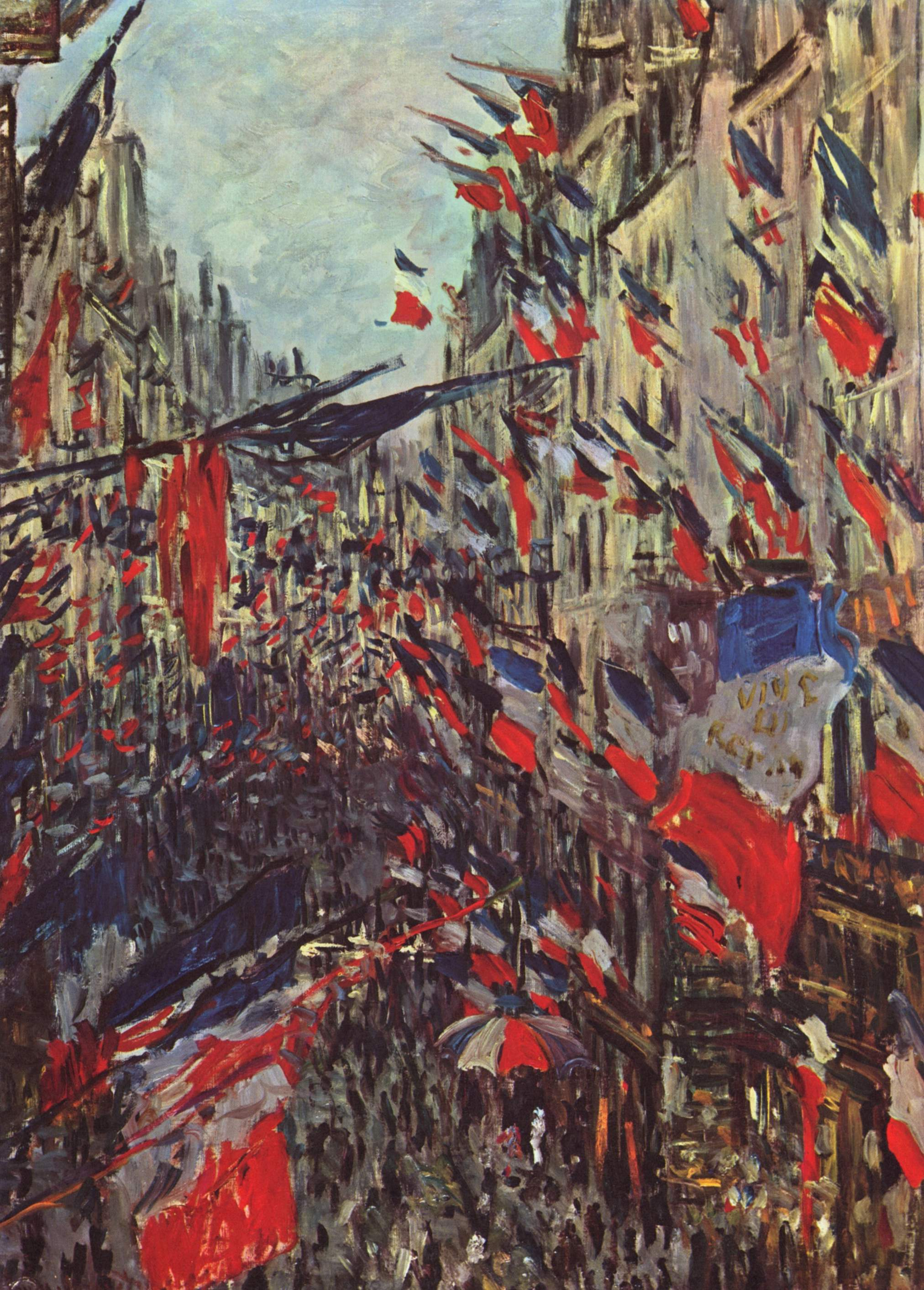
Claude Monet, Rue Saint-Denis

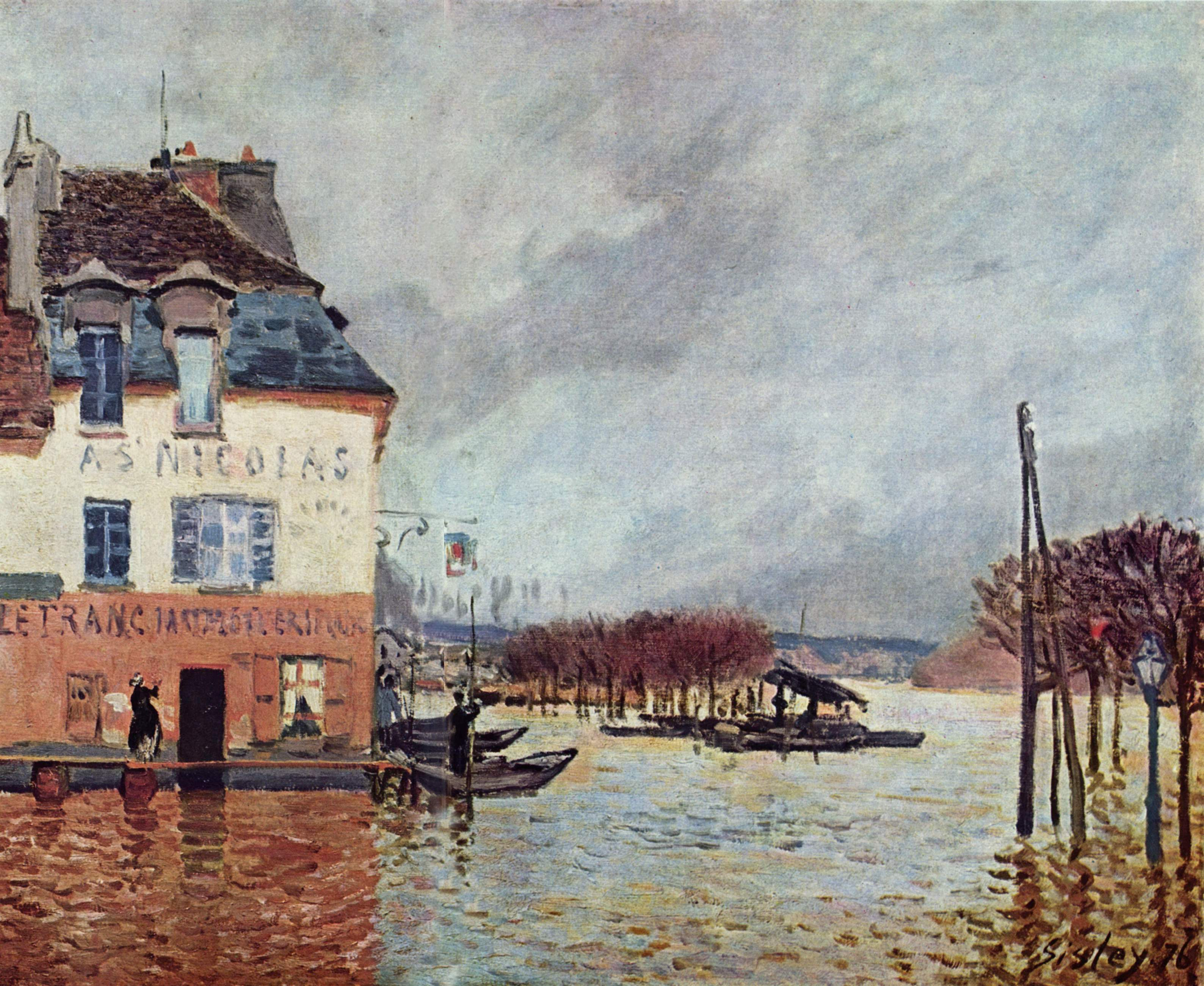
Alfred Sisley, L'Inondation à Port-Marly

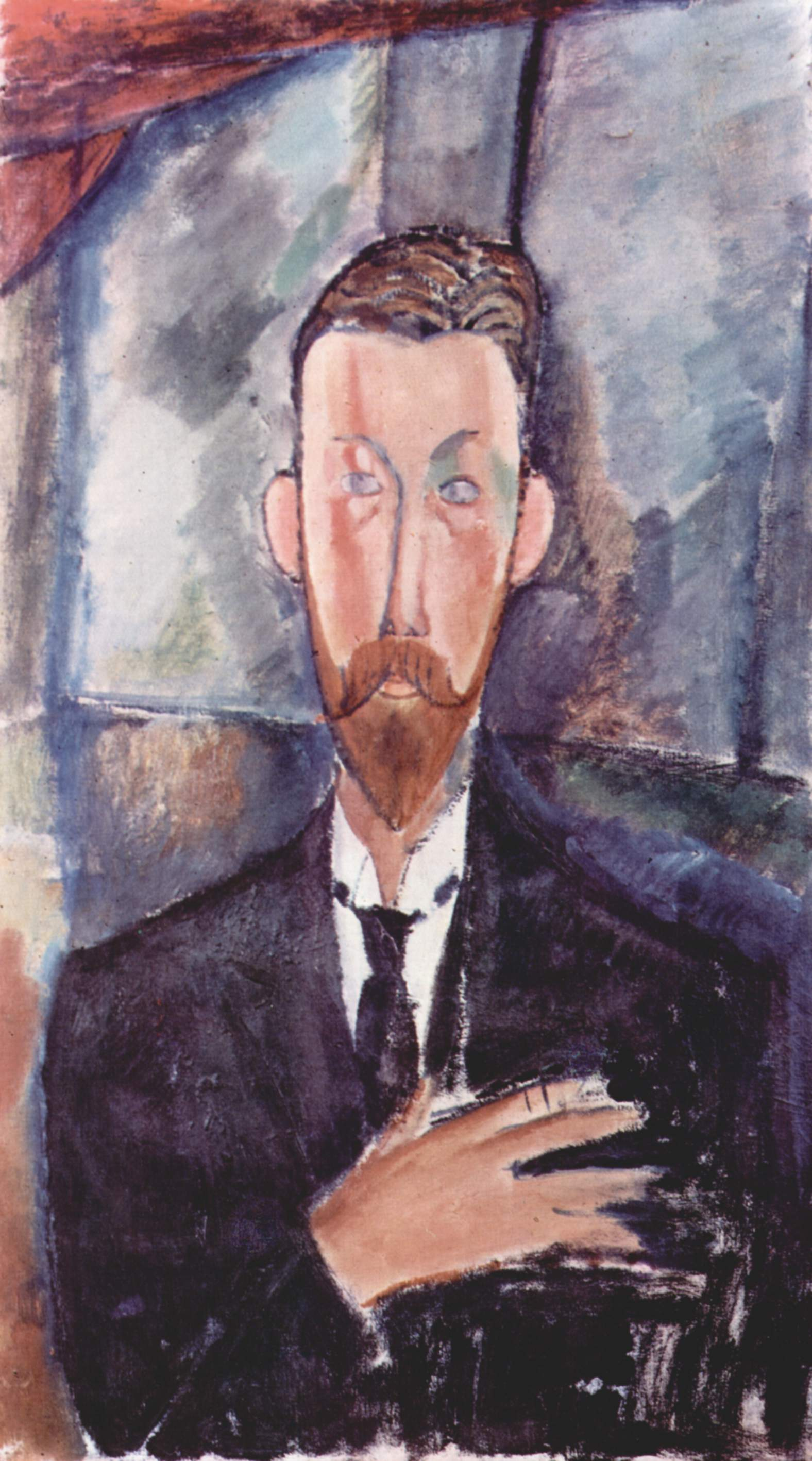
Amedeo Modigliani, Paul Alexandre devant un vitrage

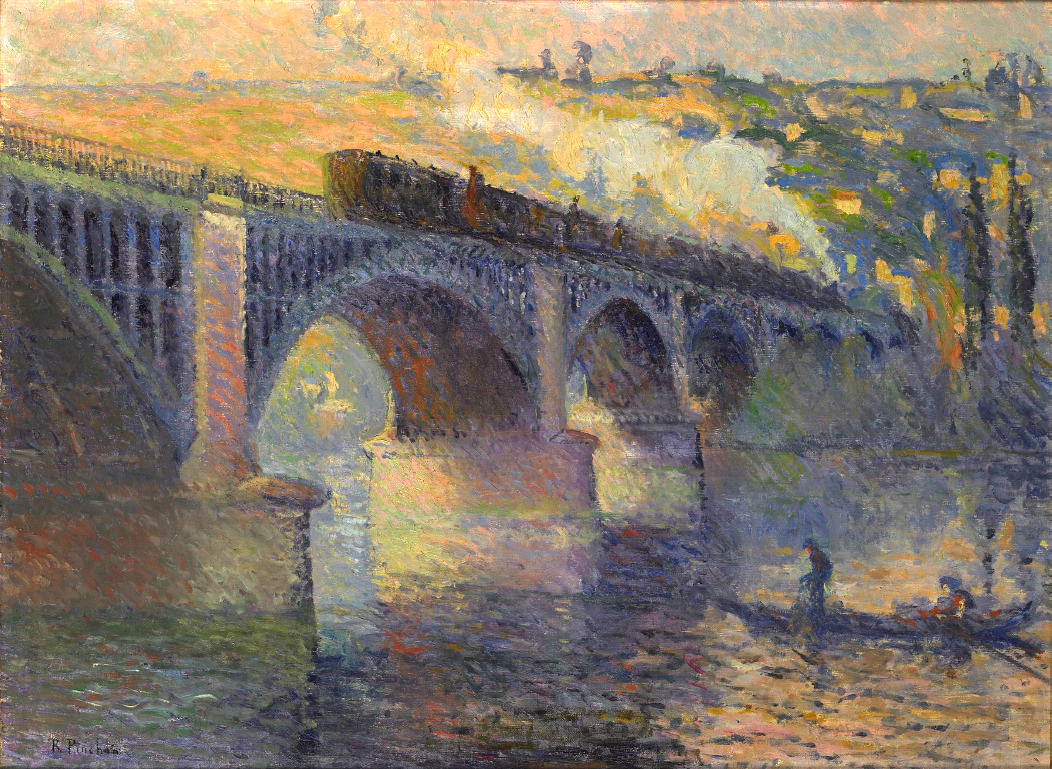
Robert Antoine Pinchon, Le Pont aux Anglais, soleil couchant, 1905. Former collection François Depeaux

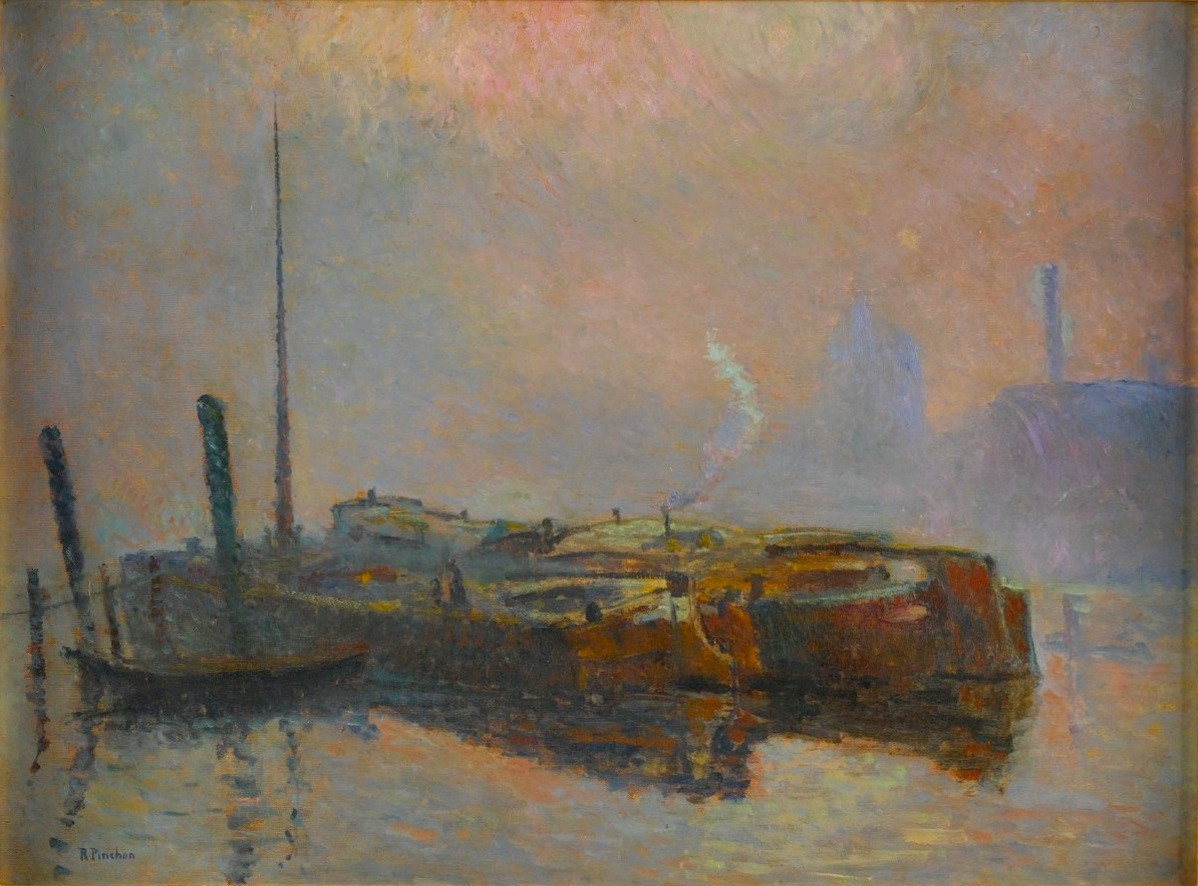
Robert Antoine Pinchon, before 1909, Péniche dans la brume, oil on canvas, 54 x 73 cm, donation François Depeaux, 1909

== Sculptures ==
The Musée des Beaux-Arts de Rouen houses a lost statue by Pierre Paul Puget. This statue of Hercules slaying the Hydra of Lerna was originally in the castle of Vaudreuil, and was discovered, in 1882, by Adolphe-André Porée on the grounds of the Biéville-Beuville castle.
