= Le Bain de Diane =

Painting by François Clouet

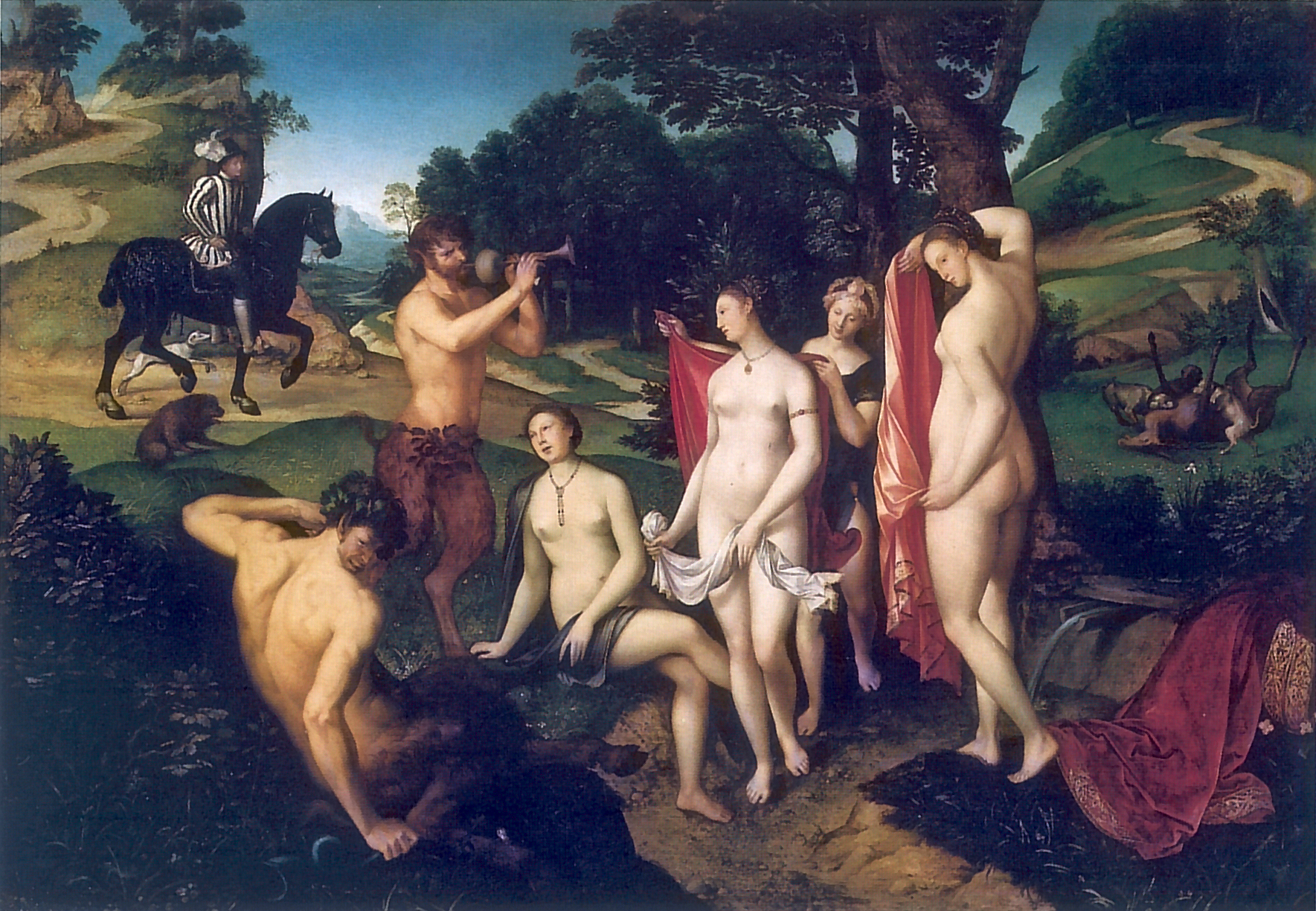
- Artist: François Clouet
- Year: 1565
- Medium: Oil on wood

Le Bain de Diane (The Bath of Diana) is a French 1550s painting attributed to François Clouet, located in the Musée des Beaux-Arts, Rouen. The painting reflects the contemporary conflict between Catholics and Protestants in Clouet's France.

== Description ==
This painting depicts Diana, the goddess of chastity, bathing. Two satyrs court her deep in the woods with her nymphs. The seated nymph is supposed to represent Catherine de Medici mourning the death of Henry II. The standing nymph represents Diane de Poitiers, Henry II's mistress. Finally, the nymph holding the wedding veil is Mary Stuart, wife of Francis II, a newcomer to the family. In the background, a man on a black horse is accompanied by a dog. He appears to have killed a stag, which other dogs are tearing apart.

== Analysis ==
According to Eckhardt Knab, writing in The Dictionary of Art, the painting is an example of an allegorical landscape. It makes reference to the new marriage of Francis II and Mary Stuart. Clouet's painting reveals his influence from Rosso Fiorentino, Francesco Primaticcio, and Nicolo dell'Abate, but tempers the overdrawn Mannerist bodily forms of these artists from the first School of Fontainebleau, while the landscape reflects the influence of Giorgione and the early Titian.

This painting depicts badly both the king's mistress, Diane de Poitiers, and the Guise family, supporters of the Catholic party that was tearing the court apart. Therefore, the painting was likely commissioned by a noble person on the Protestant side.

The stag in the background being torn apart by dogs likely alludes to a version of the Greek myth of Actaeon, who saw the goddess Artemis (whose Roman name is Diana) bathing and as punishment was transformed into a stag and devoured by his own hounds.

== Bibliography ==
- Blunt, Anthony (1953). Art and Architecture in France 1500-1700. London: Penguin Books. OCLC 1123985395.
- Knab, Eckhart (1996). "François Clouet", vol. 7, pp. 464–466, in The Dictionary of Art, 34 volumes, edited by Jane Turner. New York: Grove. ISBN 9781884446009.
