= Jean-Claude Bonnefond =

French painter and lithographer (1796–1860)

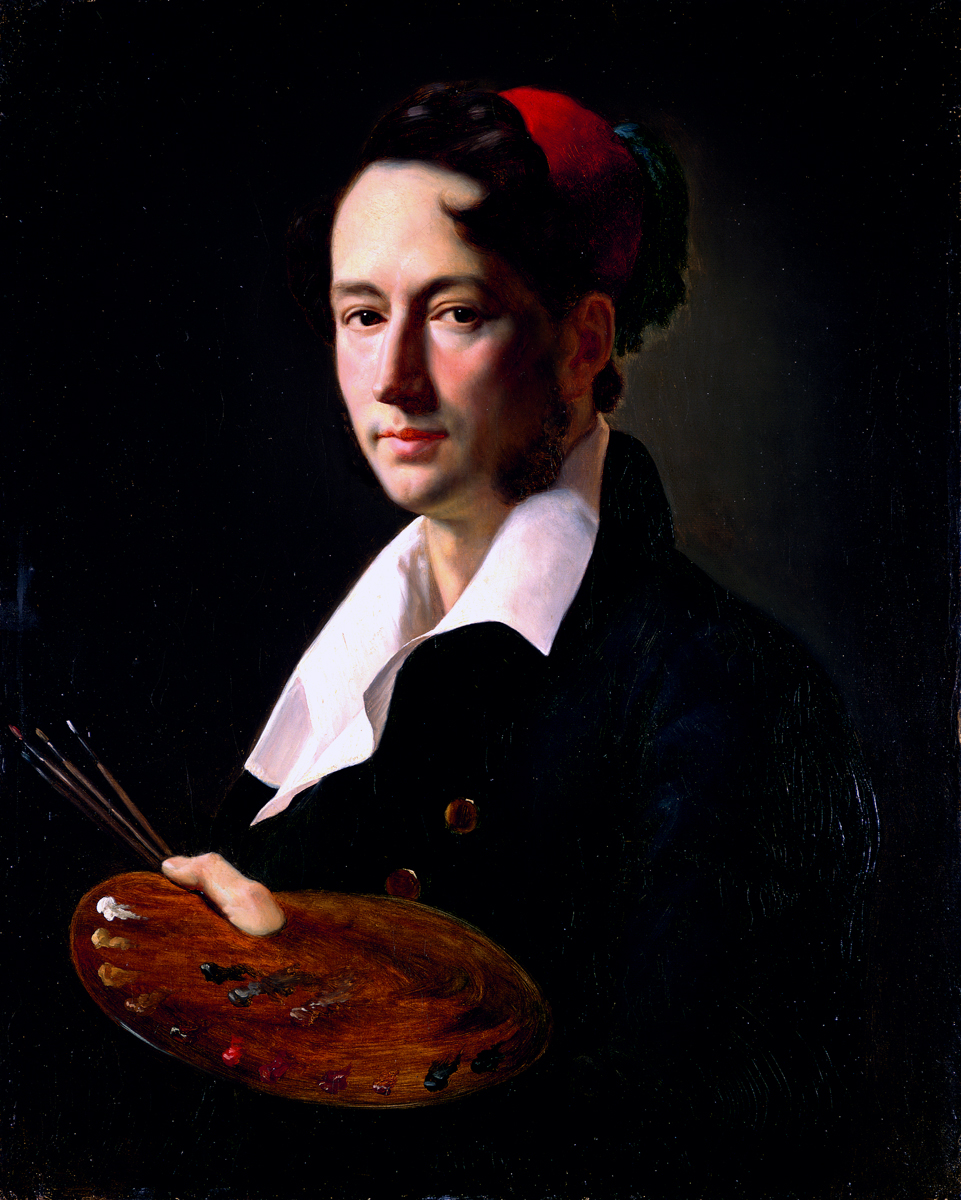
Claude Bonnefond; portrait by Sébastien Melchior Cornu

Claude Bonnefond, or Jean-Claude Bonnefond (French pronunciation: [ʒɑ̃ klod bɔnfɔ̃]; 27 March 1796, Lyon - 27 June 1860, Lyon) was a French painter and lithographer; noted for his portrayals of peasant life. His work was heavily influenced by a visit to Italy.

== Biography ==
His father was a baker who died shortly after Jean-Claude was born. His mother remarried in 1797, to another baker who was an associate of her first husband. An elder brother died in military service. In 1808, at the age of twelve, he entered the École nationale supérieure des beaux-arts de Lyon, where he studied with Pierre Revoil and Alexis Grognard (1752-1840).

In 1816, he was exempted from military service for being his family's only surviving son. The following year, he had his first exhibit at the Salon, where one of his paintings was purchased by Charles Ferdinand, Duke of Berry.

At the age of 28, he and Victor Orsel went to Paris to work in the studios of Pierre-Narcisse Guérin. Shortly after, Guérin was named Director of the Villa Medici and Bonnefond accompanied him to Rome.

While in Italy, he also visited Campania and Tuscany and made the acquaintance of several German painters of the Nazarene movement, including Julius Schnorr von Carolsfeld, Joseph Anton Koch and Johann Friedrich Overbeck.

In 1830, Victor Prunelle, the Mayor of Lyon, offered him the directorship of the École des Beaux-arts. He accepted, replacing Revoil, and held that position for thirty years. He created a school of engraving, operated by Victor Vibert (1799-1860), and the École produced seventeen laureates of the Prix de Rome between 1831 and 1860. In 1834, he was named a Knight in the Legion of Honor. His own work continued to be in the Italian style until 1840, when he turned to painting portraits of the local bourgeoisie.

He died of what was described as "blood congestion" after a long period of illness.

== Selected paintings ==
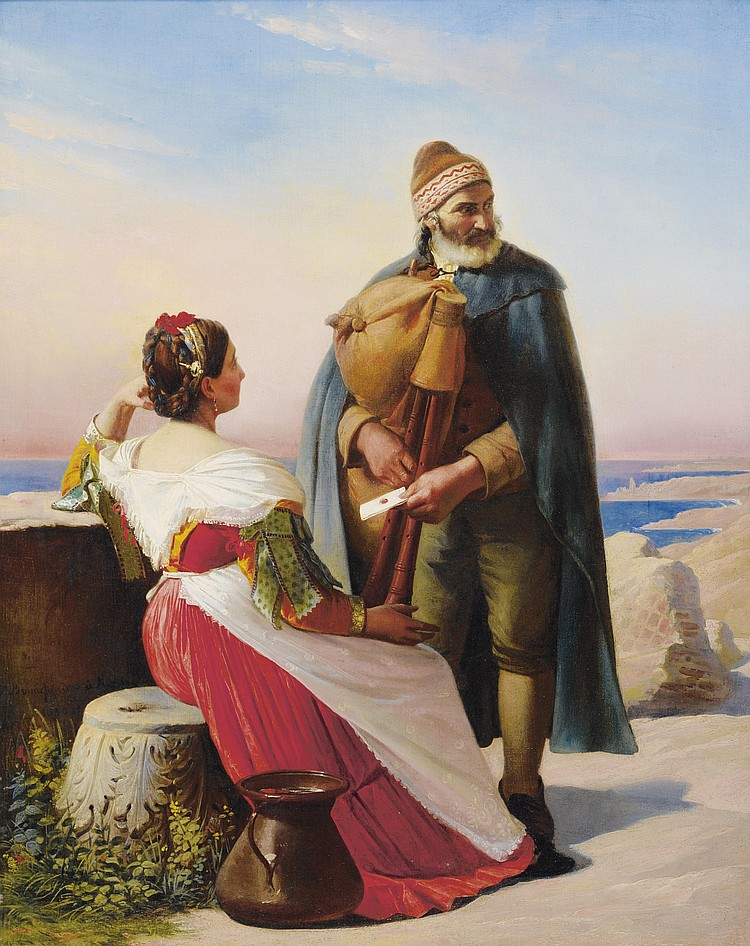
The Messenger

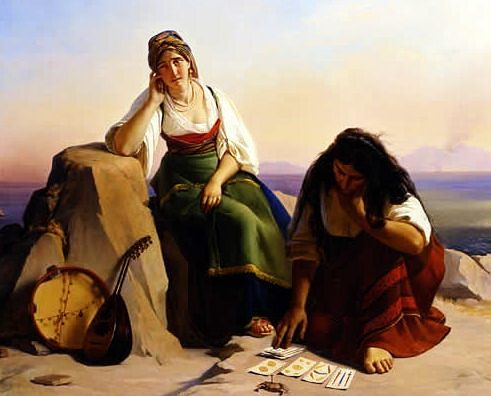
The Fortune Teller

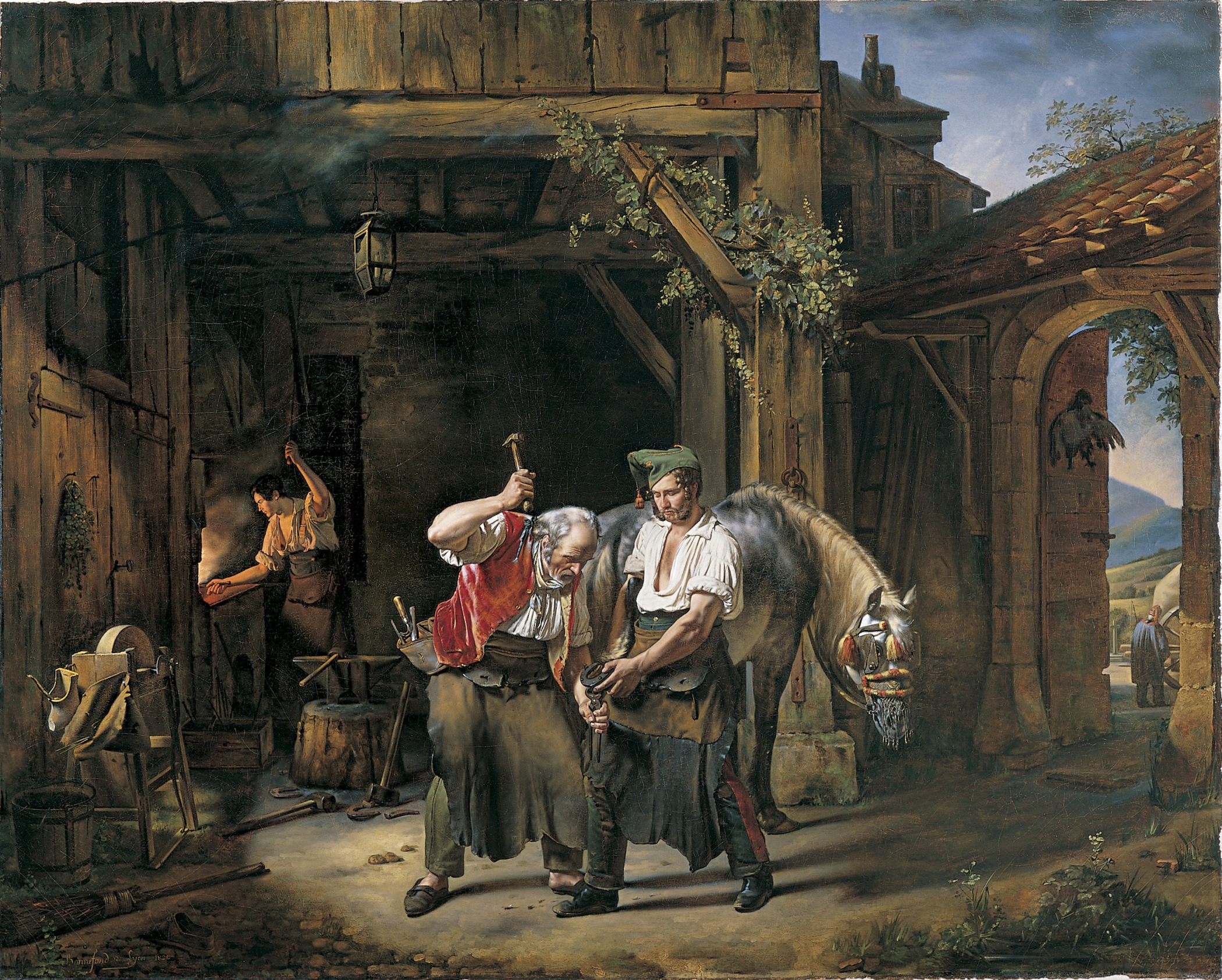
A farrier near a forge

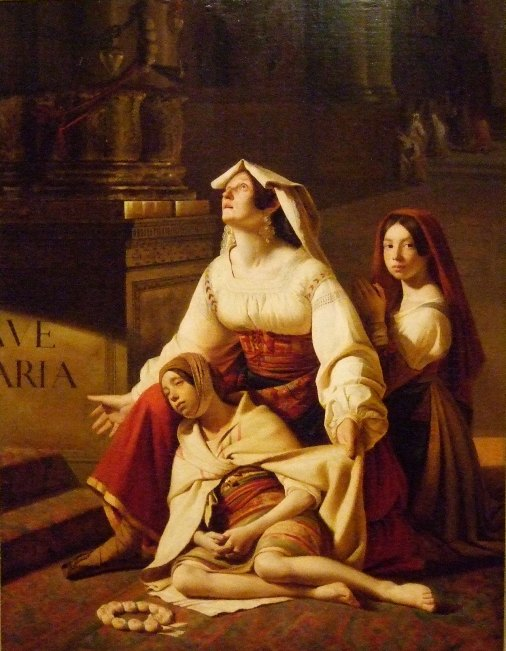
The Vow to the Madonna
