= Joan of Arc Imprisoned in Rouen =

Painting by Horace Vernet

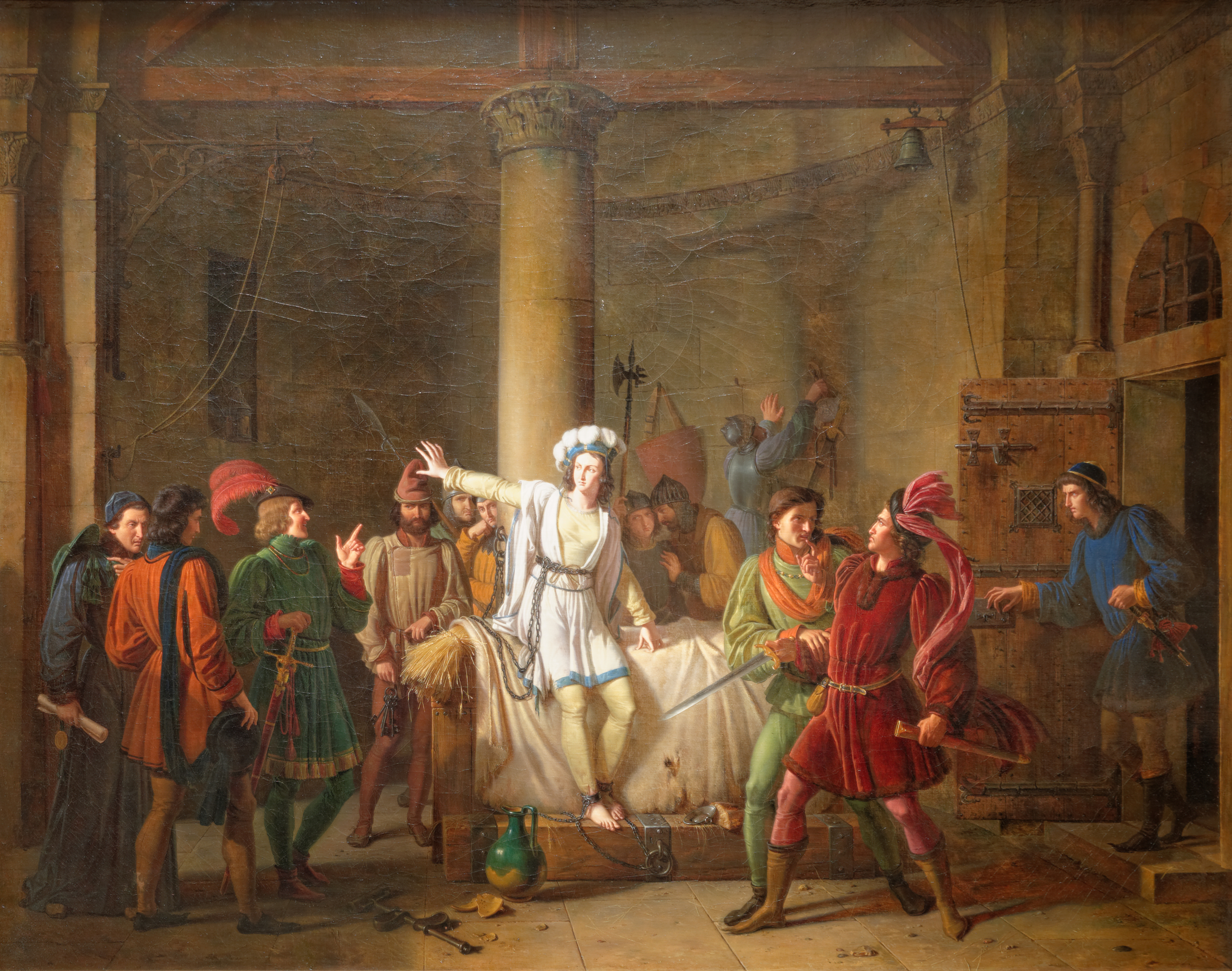
- Artist: Pierre Révoil
- Year: 1819
- Type: Oil on canvas, history painting
- Dimensions: 137 cm × 174.5 cm (54 in × 68.7 in)
- Location: Musée des Beaux-Arts, Rouen

Joan of Arc Imprisoned in Rouen (French: Jeanne d'Arc prisonnière à Rouen) is an 1819 history painting by the French artist Pierre Révoil. Produced in the Troubador style fashionable in the era, it depicts Joan of Arc imprisoned in Rouen in Normandy during the Hundred Years War.

Its composition was inspired by the neoclassical paintings of Jacques-Louis David. A sketch is now in the Metropolitan Museum of Art in New York. The final painting was exhibited at the Salon of 1819 in Paris. Today the finished work is in the collection of the Museum of Fine Arts in Rouen, having been acquired in 1931.

== Bibliography ==
- Bergot, François . The Museum of Fine Arts, Rouen: Guide to the 18th, 19th and 20th Century Collections. Musée des beaux-arts, 1994 .
- Palmer, Allison Lee. Historical Dictionary of Romantic Art and Architecture. Rowman & Littlefield, 2019.
