= Louise Colet =

French poet and writer

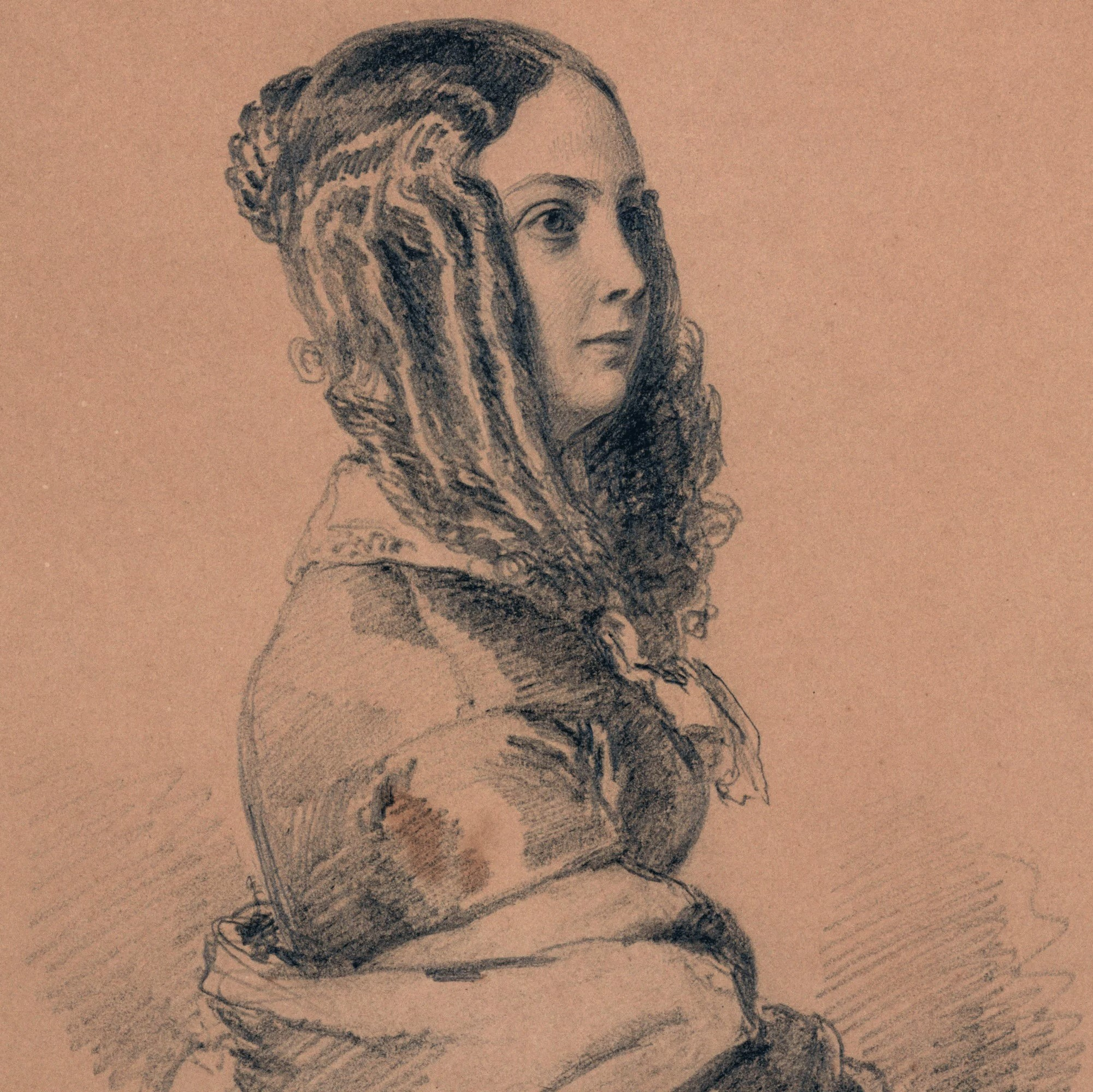
- Born: Louise Révoil de Servannes; 15 August 1810; Aix-en-Provence, France
- Died: 9 March 1876 (aged 65); Paris, France
- Occupation: Poet
- Spouse: Hippolyte-Raymond Colet
- Children: Henriette
- Writing career
- Language: French
- Period: 1836–1866

Louise Colet (French: [kɔlɛ]; 15 August 1810 – 9 March 1876), born Louise Revoil de Servannes, was a French poet and writer.

== Life and works ==
She was born at the hôtel d'Antoine (fr) in Aix-en-Provence in France. In her twenties she married Hippolyte Colet, an academic musician, partly in order to escape provincial life and live in Paris.

Upon arrival in Paris, Colet began to submit her work for approval and publication and soon won a two-thousand-franc prize from the Académie française, the first of four prizes won from the Académie. At her salon participated many of her contemporaries in the Parisian literary community, such as Victor Hugo.

In 1840, she gave birth to her daughter Henriette, but neither her husband nor her lover, Victor Cousin, would acknowledge paternity. Later she became the paramour of Gustave Flaubert, Alfred de Musset, and Abel Villemain. After her husband died, Colet supported herself and her daughter with her writing.

Her brother was the painter Pierre Révoil. Louise Colet died in Paris.

Though married to Hippolyte Colet, Louise had a steamy eight-year affair, in two stages, with Gustave Flaubert. The relationship turned sour, however, and they broke up in March 1855. In 1859, Louise wrote a novel, Lui, a thinly disguised account of her affair with Musset and her frustration with Flaubert. However, Colet's book has failed to have the lasting significance of Flaubert's 1857 novel Madame Bovary. Flaubert wrote dozens of long letters to her, in 1846–1847, then especially between 1851 and 1855. Many of them are a precious source of information on the progress of the writing of Madame Bovary. In many others, Flaubert gives lengthy appreciations and critical comments on the poems that Colet sent to him for his judgment before offering them for publication. These comments show the vast differences between the two writers on the matter of style and literary expression, she being a Romanticist whereas he was deeply convinced that the writer must abstain from gush and self-indulgence.

== Selected works ==
- Fleurs du midi (1836)
- Penserosa (1839)
- La Jeunesse de Goethe (1839)
- Les Funérailles de Napoléon (1840)
- La Jeunesse de Mirabeau (1841)
- Les Coeurs brisés (1843)
- Lui (1859)
- Enfances Célèbres (1865)
