= Cornus (disambiguation) =

Cornus is a genus of woody plants in the family Cornaceae, commonly known as dogwoods.

Cornus may also refer to:

- Cornus, Aveyron, a commune in the 'Aveyron' département of France
- Cornus, Sardinia, an archaeological site in Sardinia
- Battle of Cornus (215 BC), a battle on Sardinia in the Second Punic War
- Cornus mas, the Cornelian cherry, or dogwood cherry, a medium to large deciduous shrub

== See also ==
- Cornu (disambiguation)
