= Joseph Bharat Cornell =

American educator

Joseph Bharat Cornell (born September 2, 1950) is an American nature educator. His first book, Sharing Nature with Children, written in 1978, "helped to spark a revolution in nature education, and it soon became a classic." It was translated into 15 languages with sales of half a million worldwide.

In the field of nature education, Cornell has long been singled out as one of the most influential contributors worldwide. Among those who have so referred to Cornell are the French organization Les Anges Gardiens de la Planète (Guardian Angels of the Planet), calling him one of the “100 biggest opinion leaders committed to the environment”; the American Camp Association, calling him "a world-renowned naturalist, educator, and storyteller"; and the editor of Taproot: A Journal of Outdoor Education, calling him "one of the most inspiring nature educators today."

In 1979, Cornell started the Sharing Nature Foundation – later renamed to Sharing Nature Worldwide – to help his work in promoting nature education. Although most of his publications and awards have been under his birth name of Joseph Cornell, when he received the Indian name Bharat as a spiritual name within his spiritual community, he began publishing with it as a middle name.

Among the international awards he has received for his publications and activities in nature education are:

- recipient of an honorary award from the National Association for Interpretation "for his vast contribution in the field of natural science education";
- recipient of the Countess Sonja-Bernadotte Prize in Germany for his great influence on environmental education in Central Europe;
- selection as an honorary member of the Hungarian Society for Environmental Education –as one of three non-Hungarians along with David Attenborough and Jane Goodall –for "service as a role model for educators worldwide".

== List of publications ==
- The Sharing Nature with Children book series
  - Sharing Nature with Children: The Classic Parents' and Teachers' Nature Awareness Guidebook (1984, 2nd edition in 1998); Nevada City, California: Dawn Publications; ISBN 1-883220-73-4
  - Sharing the Joy of Nature: Nature Activities for All Ages (1989, 2nd ed. 1998), Dawn Pubs. ISBN 0-916124-52-5
  - Sharing Nature with Children II (1998); Dawn Pubs.; ISBN 1-883220-87-4; a revised edition of Sharing the Joy of Nature
  - John Muir: My Life with Nature (2000); Dawn Pubs.; ISBN 0-606-25648-2 (hardcover), ISBN 1-58469-009-7 (paperback)
- With Beauty Before Me: An Inspirational Guide for Nature Walks (2000); Dawn Pubs.; ISBN 1-58469-012-7
- Listening to Nature: How to Deepen Your Awareness of Nature (1987); Dawn Pubs.; ISBN 0-916124-35-5
- Journey to the Heart of Nature: A Guided Exploration (1995); Dawn Pubs.; ISBN 1-883220-06-8
- Ocean Animals Clue Game (1995); Dawn Pubs.; ISBN 1-883220-27-0
- Rainforest Animals Clue Game (1995); Dawn Pubs.; ISBN 1-883220-44-0
- Listening to Nature: How to Deepen Your Awareness of Nature (rev. ed. 2014); Nevada City, California: Crystal Clarity Publishers; ISBN 978-1-56589-281-1
- The Sky and Earth Touched Me: Sharing Nature Wellness Exercises (2014), Crystal Clarity Pubrs.; ISBN 978-1-56589-282-8
- Sharing Nature: Nature Awareness Activities for All Ages (2015); Crystal Clarity Pubrs.; ISBN 978-1-56589-287-3
- Deep Nature Play: A Guide to Wholeness, Aliveness, Creativity, and Inspired Learning (2018); Crystal Clarity Pubrs.; ISBN 978-1-56589-322-1
- Flow Learning: Opening Heart and Spirit Through Nature (2022); Crystal Clarity Pubrs.; ISBN 978-1-56589-095-4
