= Craig Le Cornu =

English footballer

Personal information
- Full name: Craig Douglas Le Cornu
- Date of birth: 17 September 1960 (age 66)
- Place of birth: Birkenhead, England
- Position: Midfielder

Senior career*
Years	Team	Apps	(Gls)
1980–1981	Tranmere Rovers	6	(0)
- * Club domestic league appearances and goals

Craig Douglas Le Cornu (born 17 September 1960) is an English footballer, who played as a midfielder in the Football League for Tranmere Rovers. After 40 years of anonymity, Craig was the somewhat unlikely star of the 30th June 2022 episode of 'The News Show' on the A Trip To The Moon Tranmere podcast, to the evident satisfaction of stats guru, Rob Edwards (the other one).
