= Geoffrey Cornu =

English cricketer (1913–2007)

Personal information
- Full name: Geoffrey Cornu
- Born: 29 June 1913; Sheffield, Yorkshire, England
- Died: 29 June 2007 (aged 94); England
- Batting: Right-handed
- Bowling: Leg break googly

Career statistics
Competition	First-class
Matches	5
Runs scored	60
Batting average	30.00
100s/50s	0/0
Top score	21*
Balls bowled	756
Wickets	13
Bowling average	39.46
5 wickets in innings	0
10 wickets in match	0
Best bowling	3/92
Catches/stumpings	4/–
- Source: Cricinfo, 25 December 2018

Geoffrey Cornu (29 June 1913 – 29 June 2007) was an English first-class cricketer.

Born at Sheffield, Cornu was educated at Malvern College. He made his debut in first-class cricket for the Free Foresters against Oxford University at Oxford in 1934. He made four further appearances in first-class cricket for the Free Foresters, the last of which came in 1937 against Oxford University. Across his five matches, he scored a total of 60 runs with a highest score of 21 not out, while with the ball he took 13 wickets with his leg break googly bowling, coming at a bowling average of 39.46 and best innings figures of 3/92. Cornu served as a second lieutenant with the Royal Artillery during World War II. He died on his 94th birthday in 2007.
