= Cornell Green =

Cornell Green may refer to:

- Cornell Green (defensive back) (1940–2026), American football defensive back for the Dallas Cowboys in the 1960s and '70s
- Cornell Green (offensive tackle) (born 1976), American football offensive tackle in the 2000s
