= Cornell Krieger =

German-born soccer player

Cornell Krieger is a German-born former American soccer player.

== National team ==
Krieger earned four caps with the U.S. national team in March 1965. All three games were World Cup qualifiers. The U.S. did not qualify for the World Cup that year.
