= Thomas Cornell =

Thomas Cornell may refer to:

- Thomas Cornell (politician) (1814–1890), American politician and businessman
- Thomas Cornell (publisher) (fl. 1780–1792), British publisher and printseller
- Thomas Cornell (artist) (1937–2012), American artist
