= Hortense Cornu =

French socialite (1809–1875)

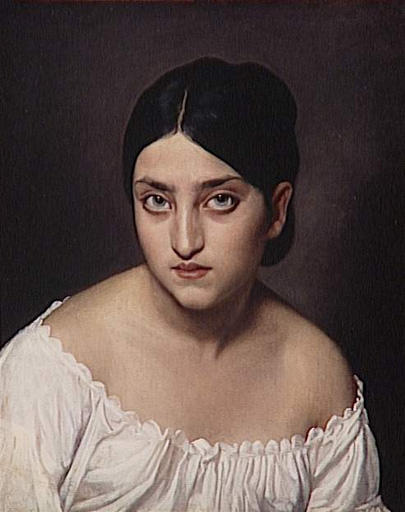
- Hortense Lacroix by Sébastien-Melchior Cornu
- Born: Albine Hortense Lacroix; 8 April 1809; Paris, First French Empire
- Died: 16 May 1875; Longpont-sur-Orge, French Third Republic
- Occupations: Writer, Translator, Salonnière
- Spouse: Sébastien Cornu (m. 1834–1870)
- Writing career
- Pen name: Sébastien Albin

Hortense Cornu (née Lacroix; 8 April 1809 – 16 May 1875) was a French socialite, salonnière, writer, and translator who played a significant role in the culture and politics of the French Second Empire. The goddaughter and foster-sister of Napoléon III, their lifelong relationship was his "closest and most lasting friendship with a woman." As an avowed Republican, she clashed with the Emperor over his authoritarianism and was estranged from him for a period of time after his 1851 coup d'état, but in the end "no political differences were allowed to mar their friendship, which was deep and true..." She advocated various French archaeological expeditions and, amongst other contributions, was involved in founding the National Archaeological Museum, France.

== Early life ==
Albine Hortense Lacroix was born in Paris, the daughter of Marie Désirée Savreux and Martin Lacroix. Marie was a lady-in-waiting to Hortense de Beauharnais, and Martin was the Maître d'hôtel of the household. Her brother was the architect Eugène Lacroix. The elder Hortense and her infant son Louis-Napoléon, only one year older than Hortense Lacroix, were chosen as her godparents. The two children were raised together as foster-siblings and shared an education until Hortense was 14.

In 1834, Hortense married the painter Sébastien Cornu.

== Relationship with Napoleon III ==
Before his rise to power, Cornu served as research assistant and advisor to Louis Napoléon during his imprisonment at Ham. She brought him the necessary books for his writing, including works on the working class in France. Blanchard Jerrold wrote that "He sought her opinion and deferred very often to her judgment. The warmth with which he thanked her again and again for her zeal and her intelligent execution of his literary and scientific commissions, the delicacy with which he endeavoured repeatedly, but always in vain, to compel her acceptance of some of the pecuniary results of his writings, testify at once to the high value and thorough unselfishness of her work."

The two friends suffered a falling out in the aftermath of Louis-Napoleon's coup d'état on 2 December 1851. As a Republican, Cornu was dismayed by Napoléon's violent overthrow of the Second French Republic. When he came to visit her at Vincennes in the wake of the coup, she told him from the top of the stairs that "she would not receive an assassin." The rupture lasted for twelve years, although Hortense broke her silence to write and congratulate the Emperor on the birth of his son, the Prince Imperial, in 1856. She also served once again to help him in his writings, this time on his Life of Caesar, and also served as an intermediary between the Emperor and a group of young writers of her acquaintance, including Ernest Renan and Léon Renier. She told one man, Nassan Senior, that "the destruction of our liberties, the massacres of 1851, the transportations of 1852, the reprisals by Orsini, rise before me, and I have a horror of being embraced by a man covered with the blood of so many friends."

Only in 1863, after she received a letter from the Emperor asking her to visit the Tuileries Palace and meet the young prince, did she relent and reestablish her friendship with the Emperor. This time, "she became convinced that he still genuinely leaned toward liberalism, which she saw as the key to perpetuating the dynasty." Cornu became a regular fixture at the palace, visiting two or three times a week. Her advice held much sway with Louis-Napoleon, who once said that "it's Hortense who gives me all my good ideas."

In 1870, Napoléon tasked her with working out a plan for profit-sharing for mining workers. One tribute to her, written after her death, stated that "she only made use of her influence with the emperor to repair and to prevent injustice, and she refused to accept a fortune from him, saying that she wished to preserve the right of telling him the truth." According to Maxime du Camp "...there was in her a liberal fund, where often she drew the strength to combat the too authoritarian counsels of which the 'entourage' was not stingy...very often she intervened to soften the punishments incurred from political offenses." Du Camp also credited her with championing Émile Ollivier, a liberal deputy who would become Louis-Napoléon's Prime Minister in 1869. In regards to foreign policy, Cornu was one of several people close to the Emperor who fervently supported Italian nationalism. According to the Empress Eugénie, it was Cornu who suggested her friend Karl of Hohenzollern-Sigmaringen to the Emperor as a candidate for the Romanian throne.

== Writings ==
Under the pseudonym of Sébastien Albin, Cornu published articles in various periodicals. In 1841 she published her translations of German popular chants and ballads (Ballades et chants populaires de l'Allemagne) and in 1848 wrote an article on the history of Italian art for the "Encyclopédie Moderne". She also contributed to the Revue du Nord in Metz, the Revue indépendante, and the Dictionnaire de la conversation.

In 1841, Cornu translated the works of Benjamin Franklin into French (Mémoires complets, oeuvres morales et littéraires de B. Franklin). In 1843, she translated the correspondence between Goethe and Bettina von Arnim into French under the Albin pseudonym (Goethe et Bettina), and later arranged for Gustave Flaubert's Salammbô (1862) to be translated into German by one of her friends.

== Cultural influence ==
Cornu promoted various archaeological expeditions in the Middle East and was the only woman to be admitted to the Académie des Inscriptions et Belles-Lettres. Through her intervention, Renan was put in charge of an expedition to ancient Phoenicia. She also played an important role in establishing the National Archaeological Museum, France at Saint-Germain-en-Laye, helping to recruit archaeologists for the new institution. She was one of those responsible for convincing Napoléon III to purchase part of the Campana Collection. She also convinced the Emperor to purchase the papers of the antiquarian Bartolomeo Borghesi; her protégé Ernest Desjardins was entrusted with concluding the transaction and publishing the papers.

According to Renan, Cornu had a particularly successful influence in the sphere of educational reform: "The creation of several courses...at the College of France, the establishment of the School for Higher Studies, many scientific missions – some of which were very fruitful – a new impulse imparted to the acquisition of objects of antiquity, a great number of publications undertaken with the justest feeling of the requirements of erudition, marked a new era...all this belonged to her indirectly, since it was under her influence that the Emperor entered into the direction of ideas which rendered the second half of his reign a very brilliant epoch for critical studies."

== Later life ==
In 1870, at the outbreak of the Franco-Prussian War, Cornu retired to a small house she owned in Longpont-sur-Orge. Her husband died in October of that year, and she herself became increasingly infirm due to a heart condition. According to Ernest Renan, "this woman, to whom so many people owed their lives and fortunes, found herself in a state bordering on privation...If some of her friends had not made her understand that her poverty would be an insupportable reproach to them, she would have died in destitution." She died at Longpont on 16 May 1875.

Cornu preserved all the letters "she had thought worthy of preservation" from Napoleon III, and gave a handful of them to his biographer Blanchard Jerrold. After her death, some 197 were obtained by Seymour de Ricci, who was forbidden by the French government from publishing them until 1908.

== Bibliography ==
- Du Camp, Maxime (1949). Souvenirs d'un Demi-Siècle: Au Temps de Louis-Philippe et de Napoléon III, 1830–1870 (in French). Paris: Hachette.
- Effros, Bonnie (2012). "'elle pensait comme un homme et sentait comme une femme': Hortense Lacroix Cornu (1809–1875) and the Musée des Antiquités nationales de Saint-Germain-en-Laye". Journal of the History of Collections. Vol. 24, no. 1. pp. 25–43.
- Emerit, Marcel (1937). Madame Cornu et Napoléon III: d'après les lettres de l'Empereur conservées à la Bibliothèque nationale et d'autres documents inédits: thèse complémentaire pour le doctorat-ès-lettres...Université de Paris (in French). Paris: Les Presses Modernes.
- Renan, Ernest (1892). Recollections and Letters of Ernest Renan. Cassell Publishing Co. pp. 218–233.
