= Peter Cornell =

Peter Cornell may refer to:

- Peter Cornell (basketball) (born 1976)
- Peter Cornell (singer) (born 1961)
