= Cornell School (Alexandria, Ohio) =

The Cornell School was a one-room schoolhouse in Alexandria, Ohio. It was built in 1886 and was in operation until 1923, when it was merged into a larger public school district.
