= Patrick Cornell =

South African cricketer (1932–2020)

Personal information
- Born: 28 September 1932; Stutterheim, South Africa
- Died: 24 February 2020 (aged 87)
- Source: Cricinfo, 6 December 2020

Patrick Cornell (28 September 1932 – 24 February 2020) was a South African cricketer. He played in twenty first-class matches from 1951/52 to 1960/61. Following his cricketing career, he became the mayor of Pietermaritzburg.
