= Sébastien-Melchior Cornu =

French painter

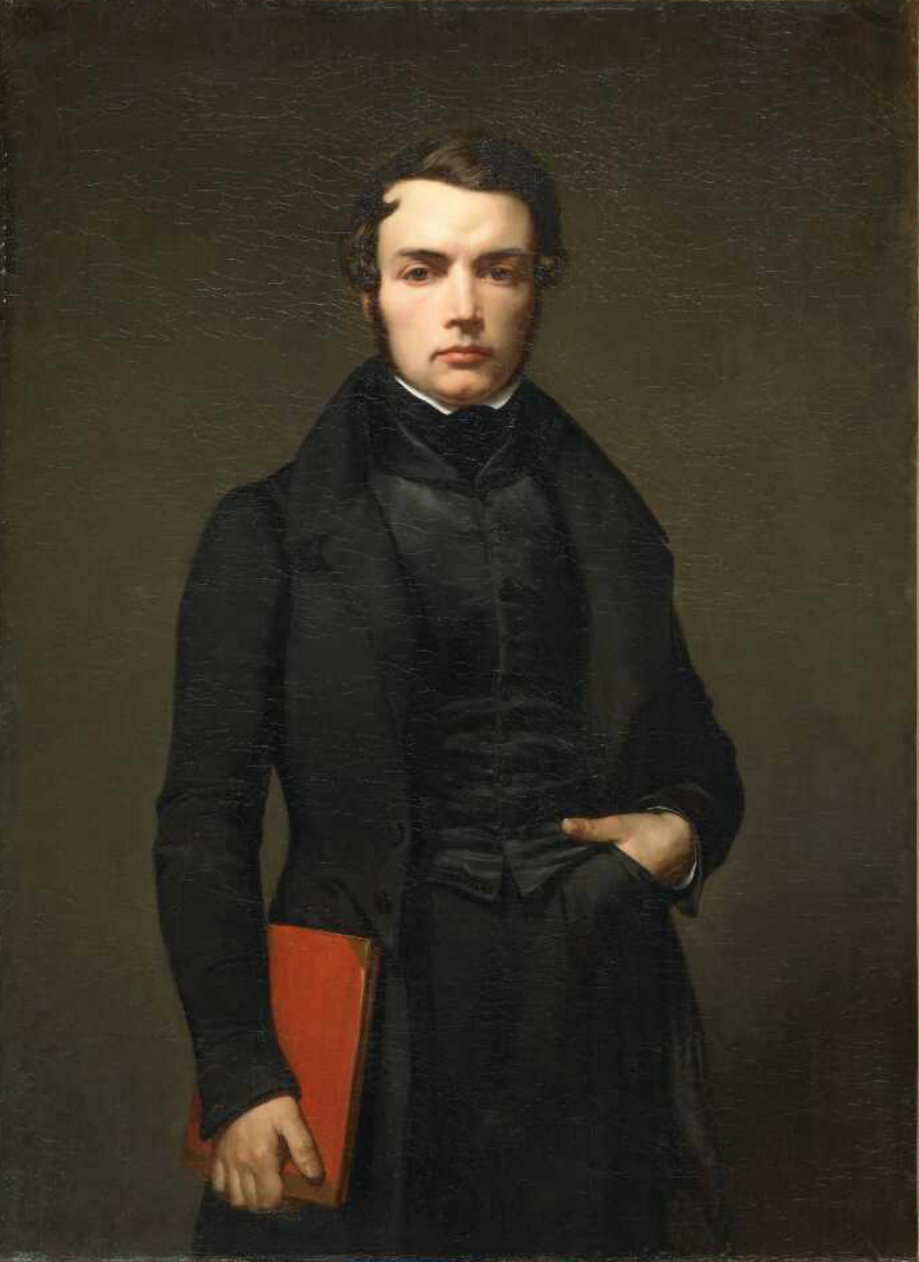
Self-portrait (1832)

Sébastien-Melchior Cornu (6 January 1804 – 23 October 1870) was a French painter, specializing in religious works and portraits.

== Life and works ==
He was born in Lyon. At the age of twelve, he began attending the École nationale supérieure des beaux-arts de Lyon. There, he took lessons in the studio of Fleury François Richard, who had been a student of Jacques-Louis David. His fellow students included Hippolyte Flandrin and Charles Gleyre. In 1820, he was awarded the École's first prize for painting, in his class. He continued his training with Jean-Claude Bonnefond, and took over his studio when he left for Italy in 1823.

He moved to Paris in 1826, where he worked in the studios of Jean-Auguste-Dominique Ingres. In 1828, Ingres asked him to go on a study trip to Italy. He would remain there, in Rome, until 1835, in the company of Gleyre. He married Hortense Lacroix, a writer and friend of Napoleon III, in 1833. Upon leaving Italy, he and Hortense travelled to Turkey and Greece, before returning to Paris.

Between 1837 and 1848, Cornu was a regular participant in exhibitions at the Salon. Thanks to his wife's noble connections, he received numerous commissions from the Royal Court and the church. His decorative work can be seen in several churches; notably Saint-Merri (1850), Saint-Séverin (1857), Saint-Roch (1859), and Saint-Germain-des-Prés (1864), where he completed a project begun by his friend, Flandrin.

His notable portraits include Alexandre Dumas, Gustave Flaubert, and George Sand. In 1859, he was named an officer in the Legion of Honor.

Cornu died on 23 October 1870 in Longpont.

== Sources ==
- Arnaud Bertinet, Sébastien Cornu, Rapport concernant le musée Napoléon III, 1862, Institut national d'histoire de l'art (Online).
- Eugène Vial, "Cornu, Sébastien-Melchior", In: Allgemeines Lexikon der Bildenden Künstler von der Antike bis zur Gegenwart, Vol. 7: Cioffi–Cousyns, E. A. Seemann, Leipzig 1912 (Online)
