= Julien Davies Cornell =

American poet

- Born: March 17, 1910; Brooklyn, New York, U.S.
- Died: December 2, 1994 (aged 84); Goshen, New York, U.S.
- Education: Swarthmore College (BA); Yale University (LLB)
- Occupation: Lawyer

Julien Davies Cornell (March 17, 1910 – December 2, 1994) was an American lawyer. Cornell, a graduate of Swarthmore College and the Yale Law School and a descendant of Ezra Cornell, was a pacifist who defended many conscientious objectors who refused to serve in World War II and wrote two books on the subject of conscientious objection, The Conscientious Objector and the Law (1943) and Conscience and the State (1944). Cornell's greatest notoriety came from his defense of Ezra Pound following Pound's indictment for treason for his wartime broadcasts denouncing the Allied war effort and its political leaders and praising Benito Mussolini and Adolf Hitler, an experience Cornell chronicled in The Trial of Ezra Pound (1966).
