= Cornea (surname) =

Cornea is a Romanian surname. Notable people with the surname include:

- Cornel Cornea (born 1981), Romanian footballer
- Dimitrie Cornea (1816–1884), Romanian politician
- Doina Cornea (1929–2018), Romanian activist and professor
- Gheorghe Cornea, Romanian footballer and coach
- Victor Vlad Cornea (born 1993), Romanian tennis player
