= Cornu de Jos =

Cornu de Jos may refer to several villages in Romania:

- Cornu de Jos, a village in Cornu Commune, Prahova County
- Cornu de Jos, a village in Drăgăneşti Commune, Prahova County
