= Justice Cornell =

Justice Cornell may refer to:

- Francis R. E. Cornell (1821–1881), associate justice of the Minnesota Supreme Court
- Gideon Cornell (1710–1766), chief justice of the Rhode Island Supreme Court
- John A. Cornell (1886–1956), associate justice of the Connecticut Supreme Court
