= Cornu =

Cornu (pl. cornua) is a Latin word for horn. Cornu may also refer to:

- Cornu (horn), an ancient musical instrument

== People ==
- Cornu (surname)

== Places ==
- Cornu, Prahova, a commune in Prahova County, Romania
- Cornu Luncii, a commune in Suceava County, Romania
- Cornu, a village in Bucerdea Grânoasă Commune, Alba County, Romania
- Cornu, a village in Orodel Commune, Dolj County, Romania
- Cornu de Jos (disambiguation), multiple places
- Cornu–, a prefix used to indicate a relation to Cornwall

== Science and medicine ==
- Euler spiral, also known as a Cornu spiral
- Latin name for a cutaneous horn, an eruption of the skin, mostly in fair skinned persons which can be benign but is often a precursor of skin cancer

=== Anatomy ===
- Cornu ammonis, a part of the hippocampus of the brain
- Cornu coccygeum, one of two upward projecting processes which articulate with the sacrum
- Cornua of the hyoid, the greater and lesser horns of the hyoid bones
- Cornu anterius and cornu posterius, parts of the lateral ventricles of the brain
- Horns of the spinal cord
  - Cornu anterius medullae spinalis
  - Cornu posterius medullae spinalis
- Sacral Cornua, two small processes projecting inferiorly on either side of the sacral hiatus leading into the sacral canal
- Uterine cornu, one of two uterine horns, located near the entry of the fallopian tube

=== Zoology ===
- Cornu (gastropod), a genus of snails
  - Cornu aspersum, species of brown garden snail, formerly known as Helix aspersa
- One of two horn claspers associated with the penis of a bee drone

== See also ==
- Le Cornu, a surname
- Corneanu (disambiguation)
- Cornetu (disambiguation)
- Corni (disambiguation)
- Cornus (disambiguation)
- Horn (disambiguation)
