= Cornel =

Cornel may refer to:

== People ==
- Cornel (given name), a list of people with the given name or nickname
- Cornel Wilde (1915–1989), American actor and director born Kornél Lajos Weisz
- Eric Cornel (born 1996), Canadian hockey player
- Cornel West (born 1953), American philosopher and political activist

== Plants ==
Several species of the dogwood family:

- Cornus amomum, also known as the silky cornel
- Cornus canadensis, Canadian dwarf cornel
- Cornus mas, Cornelian cherry or European cornel
- Cornus officinalis, Japanese cornel or Japanese cornelian cherry
- Cornus suecica, dwarf cornel
- Cornus capitata, Bentham's cornel

== Ships ==
- HMS Cornel (K-278), a British corvette transferred to the US Navy as USS Alacrity (PG-87)
- USS Cornel (AN-45), a net-laying ship that served in the Pacific theater during World War II

== See also ==
- Cornell (disambiguation)
