= Cornelia =

Cornelia may refer to:

== People ==
- Cornelia (name), a feminine given name
- Cornelia (gens), a Roman family

== Places ==
- 425 Cornelia, the asteroid Cornelia, a main-belt asteroid

Italy

- Cornelia (Rome Metro), an underground station on Rome Metro
- Via Cornelia, a Roman Empire road

South Africa

- Cornelia, Free State, a town in South Africa

United States

- Cornelia, Georgia, a city
- Cornelia, Iowa, an unincorporated community
- Cornelia, Missouri, an unincorporated community
- Cornelia, Wisconsin, an unincorporated community
- Cornelia Street, a street in Greenwich Village, Manhattan, New York City

== Other ==
- FV Cornelia Marie, a crabbing ship
- "Cornelia Street", song by Taylor Swift

== See also ==
- Corniglia, one of the five villages in the Cinque Terre, Italy
- Cornelius (disambiguation)
