= Vigée =

Vigée is a surname. Notable people with the surname include:

- Claude Vigée (1921–2020), French poet
- Étienne Vigée (1758–1820), French playwright
- Louis Vigée (1715–1767), French painter
- Louise Élisabeth Vigée Le Brun (1755–1842), French painter

== See also ==
- Vige (disambiguation), including a list of people with the surname Vige or Vigé
