= Almanach des Muses =

Magazine

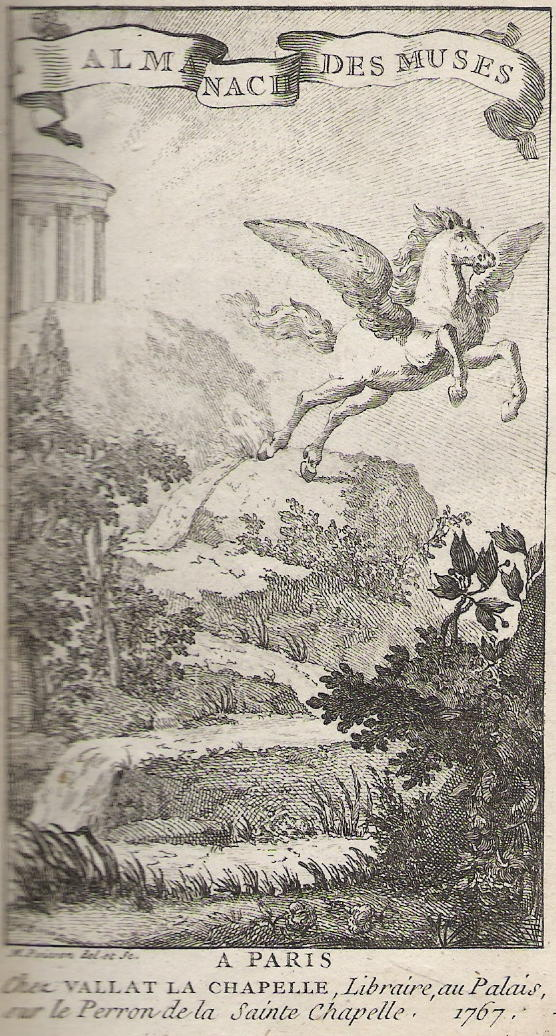
Frontispiece of Almanach des Muses, 1767

L'Almanach des Muses was a French-language poetry magazine published in Paris, France between 1765 and 1833.

== History and profile ==
Almanach des Muses was founded in 1765 by Sautreau de Marsy. The magazine was much in vogue during the second half of the 18th century.

The aim of the Almanach des Muses was to go beyond what previous almanacs had attempted by presenting to its readership a selection of recent poetry, with critical notes and information about the literary scene. Appearing annually, the Almanach des Muses published a number of lesser-known writers such as Parny, Pierre Légier, Bertin, Roucher, Colardeau or Berquin, Legouvé, Bonnard, Arnault, well-known writers such as Boufflers, Delille, Dorat, de Fontanes, La Harpe, and also the work of extremely eminent figures such as Chamfort, Beaumarchais and Baculard d'Arnaud, above all Voltaire whose writings appeared 200 times between 1765 and 1819. During the French Revolution, it printed "La Marseillaise" in 1793 and Sade's eulogy to Marat in 1794. To be published in the Almanach des Muses, like Millevoye and Marceline Desbordes-Valmore, was to have "arrived" on the literary scene.

The Almanach des Muses was both much ridiculed and much imitated. Mercier, Rivarol and Champcenetz never hesitated to attack it, dubbing it L'Almanach des Buses ("Almanac of Buzzards"). On the other hand, German language literary magazine Göttinger Musenalmanach, first published in 1769, was modelled on the magazine. The decline in reputation was slow but steady, and it ceased publication in 1833, superseded by the literary magazine as we know it today.

Sautreau de Marsy was the editor until 1793 (with Joseph Mathon de la Cour from 1766 to 1769). Étienne Vigée kept it going from 1794 to 1820, succeeded in turn by Justin Gensoul (1821–29) and Jean-Pierre Lesguillon (1830-33).

== Bibliography ==
- Jean-Pierre de Beaumarchais, Dictionnaire des œuvres littéraires de langue française, Paris, Bordas, 1994. ISBN 2-04-018550-X
- Georges Grente, Dictionnaire des lettres françaises, Paris, A. Fayard, 1951.
- Catriona Seth, « Les Muses de l'Almanach. La poésie au féminin dans l'Almanach des muses, 1789-1819 », Masculin/Féminin dans la poésie et les poétiques du XIXe siècle, sous la direction de Christine Planté, Lyon, P. U. de Lyon, 2002, p. 105-119..
- Catriona Seth, « L'élégie dans l'Almanach des muses, évolution d'une sensibilité », Cahiers Roucher-André Chénier n° 25 (2006), p. 49-61.
- Catriona Seth, « Les illustrations de l'Almanach des Muses », Poésie et illustration, sous la direction de Lise Sabourin, Nancy, PUN, 2009.
- Catriona Seth, « Les sciences dans l'Almanach des Muses », Cahiers Roucher – André Chénier n°28 (2009).
