= Pierre Légier =

French poet, librettist and professor

Pierre Légier (1734, in Jussey – 7 January 1791, ibid)) was an 18th-century French writer, librettist, jurist and mayor. After a brief military career, he studied law in Paris and tried his luck at literature. His early verse met some success but his dramatic works did not. He then returned to his hometown to take some administrative positions (including that of mayor) without completely abandoning literature. He was received at the Académie des sciences, belles-lettres et arts de Besançon et de Franche-Comté in 1780.

Voltaire speaks of him in unflattering terms in a letter to Count of Tressan dated 3 February 1758.

== Works ==
- 1763: Le Rendez-vous, opera in one act and in verse, mingled with ariettes on a music by Duni.
- 1765: Épitre à monsieur Diderot, in Correspondance littéraire, philosophique et critique, 15 May, then, but abridged in the Mercure de France, July 1765, (p. 45).
- 1769: Les protégés, three-act comedy, Paris.
- 1769: Amusements poétiques, London and also kept in Orléans, Couret de Villeneuve, collection of tales and epistles (read online).
- 1780: Traité historique et raisonné : d'après les loix, règlements et usages, sur les différentes procédures qui s'observent dans toutes les jurisdictions de l'enclos du Palais, à Paris tant en première instance, qu'en cause d'appel (...), P. F. Gueffier, 576 p. (réf. online).
- 1780: L'influence du luxe sur les mœurs et les arts, discours de réception en vers à l'Académie de Besançon, le jour de la saint Martin, éd. Besançon, Lépagnez cadet, 1780, 20 pages.
- 1780: Le Berger, fable.
- 1782: Épitre à un amateur des Beaux-Art.
- 1783: Susky, cautionary tale in prose, published in Affiches de Franche-Comté.
- 1784: L'Orateur, poem to abbot Talbert.
- From 1765: Different pieces in the Almanach des Muses.

== Bibliography ==
- Charles Weisse, Notice sur M. Légier, in Mémoires de la Société d'agriculture de la Haute-Saône, Vesoul, 1812, tome III, p. 251-260. L'auteur a publié une synthèse de cette notice dans la Biographie universelle, ancienne et moderne, Paris, L. G. Michaud, 1819, vol. 23, p. 569.
- N. L. M. Desessarts et al., Les siècles littéraires de la France, Paris, chez l'auteur, an IX (1801), tome 4, p. 127.
