= Suire =

Suire (French pronunciation: [syiʁ]) is a French surname. Notable people with this surname include:

- Catherine Suire (born 1959), French tennis player
- Jacques Suire (born 1943), French cyclist
- Karl von Le Suire (1898–1954), German general
- Pierre-André Le Suire (1742–?), French enameller
- Wilhelm von Le Suire (1787–1852), Bavarian lieutenant general

== See also ==
- Suir
