= Robert-Martin Lesuire =

French writer

Robert-Martin Lesuire (1737, Rouen – 17 April 1815) was a French writer. Several of his works are forerunners of crime fiction - a French dictionary of the subject states that "by the richness of his themes, he inspired a number of writers of popular crime novels in the 19th century". He was also a member of Rouen's Académie des sciences, belles-lettres et arts.

== Life ==
He was from a nephew of the enameller Pierre-André Le Suire. On leaving college, he became reader to the Infante of Spain in Paris, following him to Italy before visiting England. Towards the end of the French Revolution he was made professor of legislation at the école centrale in Moulins but lost that position when lycées were set up. On returning to Paris, he wrote to order for booksellers in order to make a living.

Quérard wrote of Lesuire that:

The success of some of the several publications Lesuire launched upon the public each year made him believe he was a genius and he placed no limits on his manner of writing. Without taste, without judgement, he abused his spirit and his imagination to dress the most bizarre and the most inconsistent ideas in an incorrect and trivial style

His first novel Les Sauvages de l’Europe (The Savages of Europe, 1760) was a burlesque satire of England in which two young Frenchmen, Sansor and Tintine, who enthusiastically travel to England, thinking it more democratic than France. However, they suffer all sorts of misadventures and discover nothing but abominations - inhabitants halfway between man and beast, riots, hangings, hypocrisy, corruption, ever-present Francophobia and appalling food. Finally they adjudge it an island of savages and return to France, vowing never to return. The book saw some success and was translated into English and re-published in France.

His most famous novel remains L'Aventurier françois (The French Adventurer, 1782), which Quérard calls a "cluster of incoherent follies", adding that in his opinion it "delighted frivolous readers" until the issue of the third set of books in the series, at which point the public lost interest. It narrated the adventures and extraordinary travels of Grégoire Merveil, including his discovery of a subterranean people of old criminals. Accused of murder, he had to make his own inquiries to discover and confound the real murderer. Le Crime (1789) tells of the imprisonment of the young man César de Perlencour who is released from jail and falls into the hands of a curious secret society, the "Société souterraine" or underground society. That character returned and was found innocent in his next novel, Le Repentir (1789).

He left behind several manuscripts, several of which are erotic or pornographic. Emile Queruau-Lamerie owned manuscripts of songs by Lesuire and his friends. Lesuire gave Laval library (fr) a manuscript of a play and to Louis Garnier, an architect in Laval, a manuscript of his four-volume novel entitled "L'Aventurier Français".

== Works ==
=== The French Adventurer series ===
- L'Aventurier français, ou Mémoires de Grégoire Merveil (The French Adventurer, or the Memoirs of Grégoire Merveil), 1782 Online 1 2
- Suite de l'Aventurier français, ou Mémoires de Grégoire Merveil, marquis d'Erbeuil (Sequel to the French Adventure, or the Memoirs of Grégoire Merveil, marquis of Erbeuil), 1785 Online 1 2
- Seconde suite de l'Aventurier français, contenant les mémoires de Cataudin, chevalier de Rosamene, fils de Grégoire Merveil (Second sequel to The French Adventurer, containing the memoirs of Cataudian, knight of Rosamene and son Grégoire Merveil), 4 volumes, 1785-1788 Online 1 3 4
- Dernière suite de l'Aventurier français, contenant les mémoires de Ninette Merviglia, fille de Grégoire Merveil, écrits par elle-même, & traduits de l'italien, par son frère Cataudin (Last sequel to The French Adventurer, containing the memoirs of Ninette Merviglia, daughter of Grégoire Merveil, written by herself and translated from the Italian by her brother Cataudin), 1788 Online 1 2
- La Courtisane amoureuse et vierge, ou Mémoires de Lucrèce, écrits par elle-même, pour servir de nouvelle suite à l'Aventurier français (The amorous virgin courtesan, or Memoirs of Lucrèce, written by herself, as a new sequel to The French Adventurer), 2 vol., 1802

=== Other ===
- Les Sauvages de l'Europe, 1760; translated into English as The Savages of Europe, 1764 Online; republished as Les Amants franc̜ais à Londres, ou les Délices de l'Angleterre (The French Lovers in London, or the Delights of England), 1780 Online
- Épître à M. de Voltaire (Letter to Monsieur Voltaire), 1762
- La Vestale Claudia à Titus (The Vestal Virgin Claudia to Titus), héroïde, 1767
- Coup d'œil sur le salon de 1775, par un aveugle (A glance at the 1775 salon, by a miser), 1775
- Éloge du maréchal de Catinat, dédié a lui-même. Discours qui n'a point concouru pour le prix de l'Académie française (Eulogy of marshal Catinat, dedicated to him. Speech that did not compete for the Académie française prize), 1775
- Jugement d'une demoiselle de quatorze ans sur le Salon de 1777 (A young girl of fourteen's judgement on the 1777 Salon), 1777
- Les Noces patriarchales (The ancestors' wedding feasts), prose poem with five verses in rhyme, 1777 Online
- Lettre de M. Camille Trillo, fausset de la cathédrale d'Auch, sur la musique dramatique (Letter from Monsieur Camille Trillo, falsetto of Auch Cathedral, on theatre music), 1777
- Le Mort vivant, au Salon de 1779 (Still life, at the 1779 Salon), 1779
- Histoire de la république des lettres et arts en France (History of the republic of letters and arts in France), 5 volumes, 1779-1883 Online 1779-1780
- Aux mânes de Jean-Jacques Rousseau (To the shade of Jean-Jacques Rousseau), 1780
- La Muette qui parle au Salon de 1781 (The speaking mute at the 1781 Salon), 1781
- Le Nouveau monde, ou Christophe Colomb (The New World, or Christopher Columbus), 12 canto poem, 2 volumes, 1782 Online 1 2
- La Morte de trois mille ans, au Salon de 1783 (The death of 3000 years, at the 1783 Salon), 1783
- Le Philosophe parvenu, ou lettres et pièces originales contenant les aventures d'Eugène Sans-Pair (The complete philosopher, or letters and original pieces containing the adventures of Eugène Sans-Pair), 6 volumes, 1787-1788
- Le Crime ou lettres originales, contenant les Aventures de César de Perlencour (The Crime or original letters containing the Adventures of César de Perlencour), 4 volumes, 1789 Online 1 2 3 4
- Le Repentir ou suite des lettres originales, contenant les Aventures de César de Perlencour'' (The Repentance or sequel of original letters, containing the Adventures of César de Perlencour), 1789
- Le Mariage des prêtres réfuté. Le Célibat vengé (Priests' marriage refuted. The celibate avenged), 1790
- Charmansage, ou Mémoires d'un jeune citoyen faisant l'éducation d'un ci-devant noble (Charmansage, or Memoirs of a young citizen educating a would-be nobleman), 4 volumes, 1792
- Le Secret d'être heureux, ou Mémoires d'un philosophe qui cherche le bonheur (The secret to being happy, or Memoirs of a philosopher searching for good fortune), 2 volumes, 1796
- Confession des hommes célèbres de France, écrite par eux-mêmes, et mise en français moderne. Clément Marot. François Rabelais. Michel de Montaigne (Confessions of famous men of France, written by themselves and adapted into modern French. Clément Marot. François Rabelais. Michel de Montaigne, 3 volumes, 1797-1798
- Le Législateur des chrétiens, ou l'Évangile des déicoles (The Legislator of the Christians, or the Evangelist to the worshippers), 1798
- La Paméla française, ou Lettres d'une jeune paysanne et d'un jeune ci-devant, contenant leurs aventures (The French Pamela, or Letters from a young peasant girl and from a young man, containing their adventures), 4 volumes, 1803

== Sources ==
- (in French) Claude Mesplède (ed.), Dictionnaire des littératures policières, vol. 2 : J - Z, Nantes, Joseph K, coll. « Temps noir », 2007, 1086 p. (ISBN 978-2-910-68645-1, OCLC 315873361), p. 195
