= The Dauphin's Entry Into Paris =

Painting by Jean-Auguste-Dominique Ingres

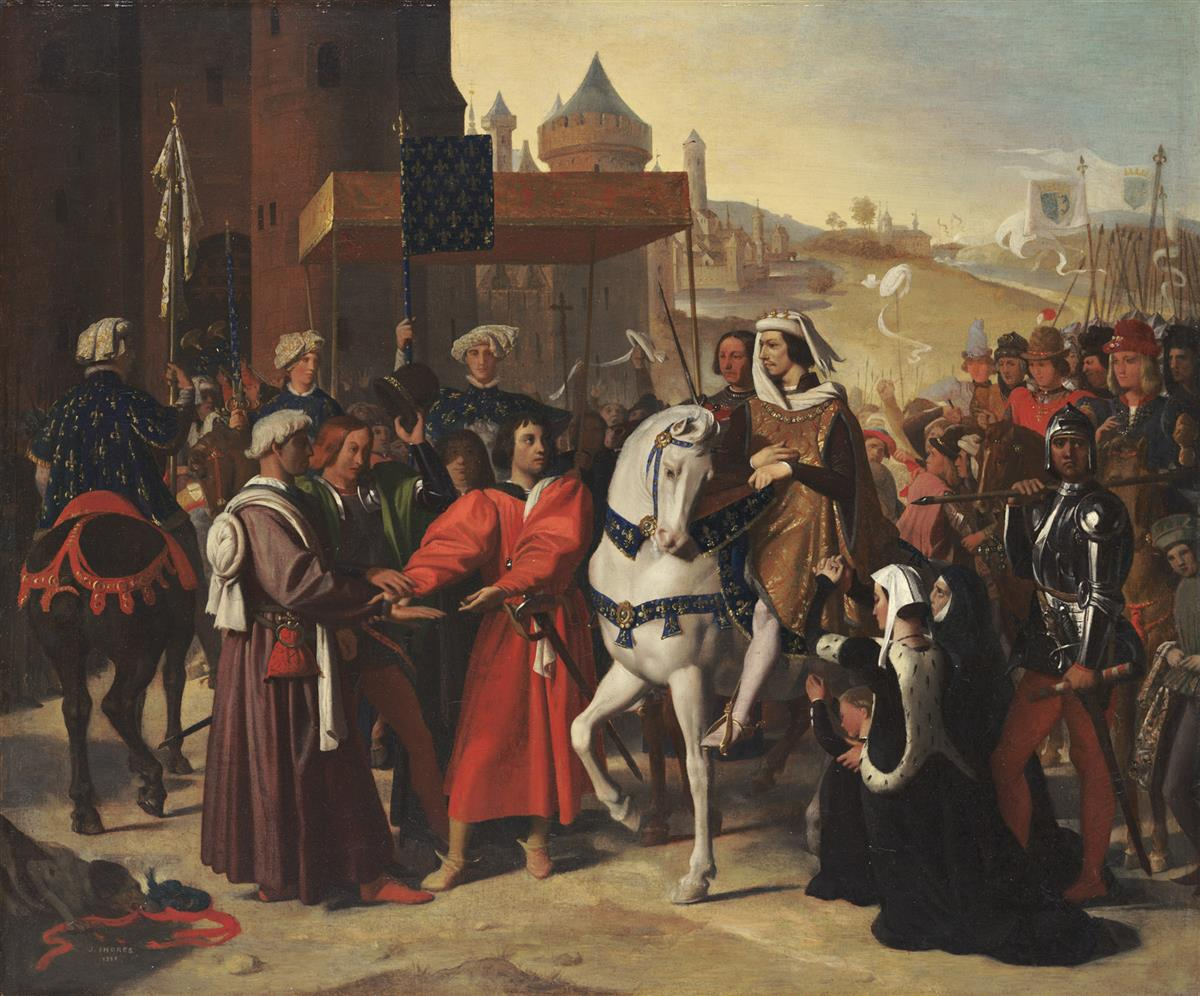
The Dauphin's Entry Into Paris (1821) by Ingres

The Dauphin's Entry Into Paris is an oil-on-canvas painting by the French Neoclassical artist Jean-Auguste-Dominique Ingres, executed in 1821. It is now in the Wadsworth Atheneum collection in Hartford, Connecticut.

As a small-scale painting of a scene from medieval history it belongs to the painter's Troubador style period. It shows the future Charles V of France returning to Paris on 2 August 1358 after a revolt there. It was commissioned by Amédée-David de Pastoret, whose ancestor Jehan Pastoret, president of the parlement of Paris, is shown in red.

== See also ==
- List of paintings by Jean-Auguste-Dominique Ingres

== Bibliography ==
- Condon, Patricia; Cohn, Marjorie B.; Mongan, Agnes (1983). In Pursuit of Perfection: The Art of J.-A.-D. Ingres. Louisville: The J. B. Speed Art Museum. ISBN 0-9612276-0-5
- Rosenblum, Robert (1986). Ingres. Paris: Cercle d'Art, coll. "La Bibliothèque des Grands Peintres". (ISBN 2-7022-0192-X)
- Ternois, Daniel (1980). Ingres. Paris: Fernand Nathan. (ISBN 2-09-284-557-8)
