= Charles-Joseph Mathon de la Cour =

French art critic, mathematician, financier, and essayist

Charles-Joseph Mathon de la Cour (6 October 1738, Lyon – 15 November 1793, Lyon) was a French art critic, mathematician, financier, and essayist.

== Life ==
He was the son of the mathematician Jacques Mathon de la Cour (1712–1777).

He wrote distinguished works such as L'État des finances de la France ("The state of French finances", 1758), the Lettres sur les peintures, sculptures et gravures exposées au salon du Louvre ("Letters discussing the paintings, sculptures and engravings exhibited at the Louvre", Paris, 1763–1767, 3 vol. duodecimo), L'Opéra d'Orphée et d'Eurydice ("The opera Orphée et Eurydice", 1765) as well as Dissertations and Discours such as Discours sur les meilleurs moyens de faire naître et d'encourager la patriotisme dans une monarchie ("Essay on the best methods of kindling and fostering patriotism in a monarchy", Paris: Cuchet et Gatty, 1788, octavo), etc. He took an interest in charitable works and created the Société Philanthropique de Lyon.

In the 1760s he considered starting a music journal called Le Rossignol, but instead helped Sautreau de Marsy with his Almanach des Muses ("Almanac of the Muses"), and in 1773 briefly edited Nicolas Framery's Journal de musique. He founded the Journal de Lyon in 1784 (12 vol. octavo).

Mathon de la Cour's generosity and distinction could not protect him during the Revolution; after the siege of Lyon he was guillotined.

== Fortuné Ricard ==
In 1785 he caught the attention of Benjamin Franklin, whom he greatly admired, with his friendly parody of Poor Richard, Testament de M. Fortuné Ricard ("Last Will and Testament of Fortunate Richard"), in which the main character leaves five lots of 100 livres in his will on the condition that each be allowed to compound for 100, 200, 300, 400 or 500 years, the resulting billions and trillions of livres then to be spent on impossibly elaborate utopian projects. Amused, Franklin responded by leaving £1,000 ($4,444) to each of Boston and Philadelphia on the condition that the money be cautiously lent at 5% interest to young men finishing their apprenticeships and continue to gather interest for no fewer than 100 years. He estimated that after a century each fund would total £131,000 ($582,000), and that £100,000 of each could then be spent on public works that he specified in detail. The remaining £31,000 could then be reinvested for another 100 years, by which time it would, he thought, be worth £4,061,000. Of this three million would be left to the government and the rest distributed among the city's inhabitants.

In fact in July 1891 the Philadelphia fund was $90,000 and the Boston fund was $391,000; by that time, the assumptions of the will were very out-of-date and the public works he had described had already been completed. Nevertheless, despite an attempt by several of Franklin's heirs to obtain the money in 1890, the funds still exist and continue to increase, and the story is often cited as an example of the power of compound interest.

== Works ==
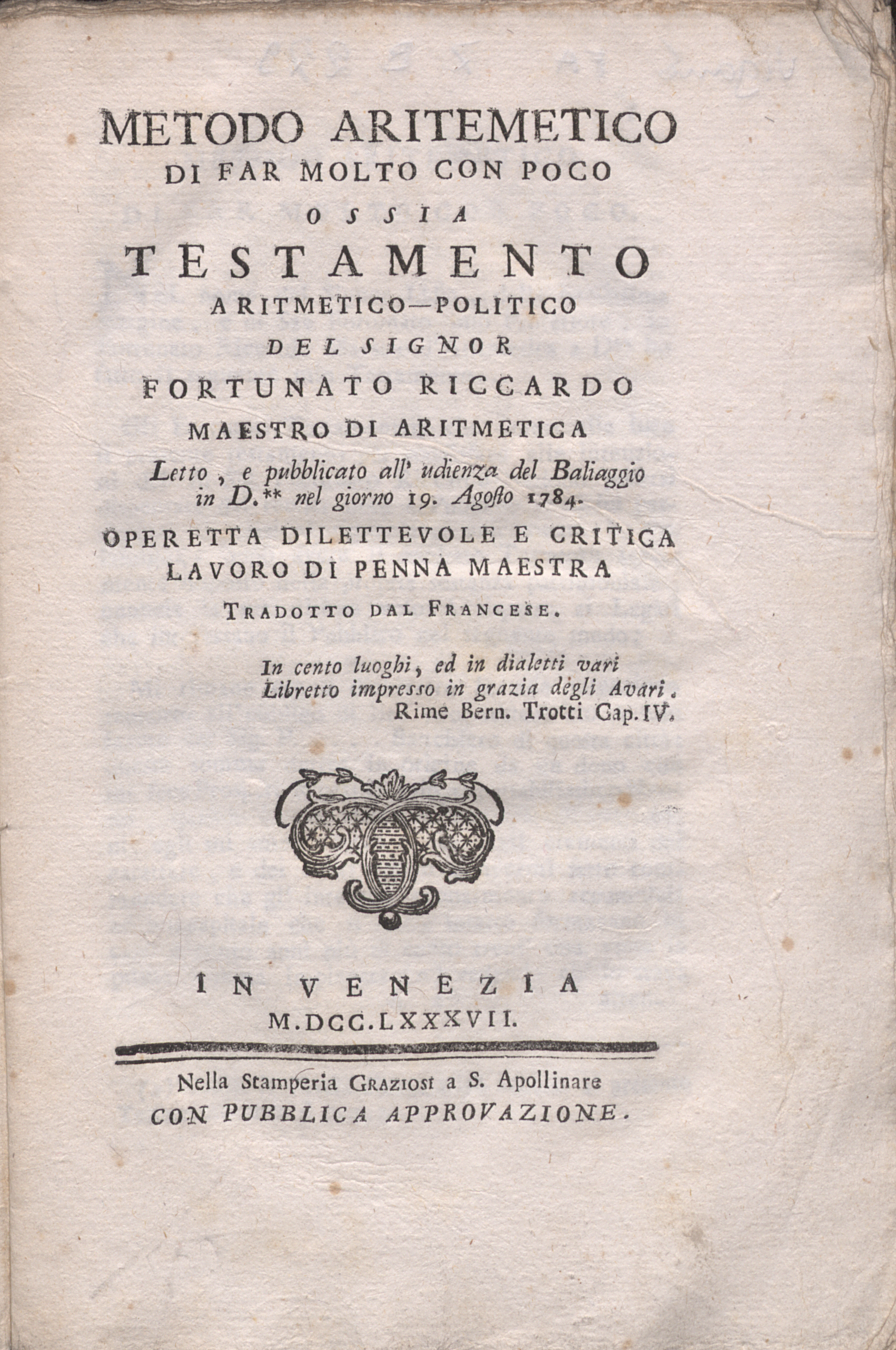
Testament de M. Fortuné Ricard, Italian ed. (1787)

- Testament de M. Fortuné Ricard (in French). 1784.
  - Metodo aritemetico di far molto con poco ossia testamento aritmetico-politico (in Italian). Venice: Antonio Graziosi. 1787.

== Bibliography ==
- Gustave Vapereau, Dictionnaire universel des littératures, Paris, Hachette, 1876, p. 1357
- Will of Fortuné Ricard
- The Last Will and Testament of Benjamin Franklin
