= Étienne Vigée =

French playwright and poet (1758–1820)

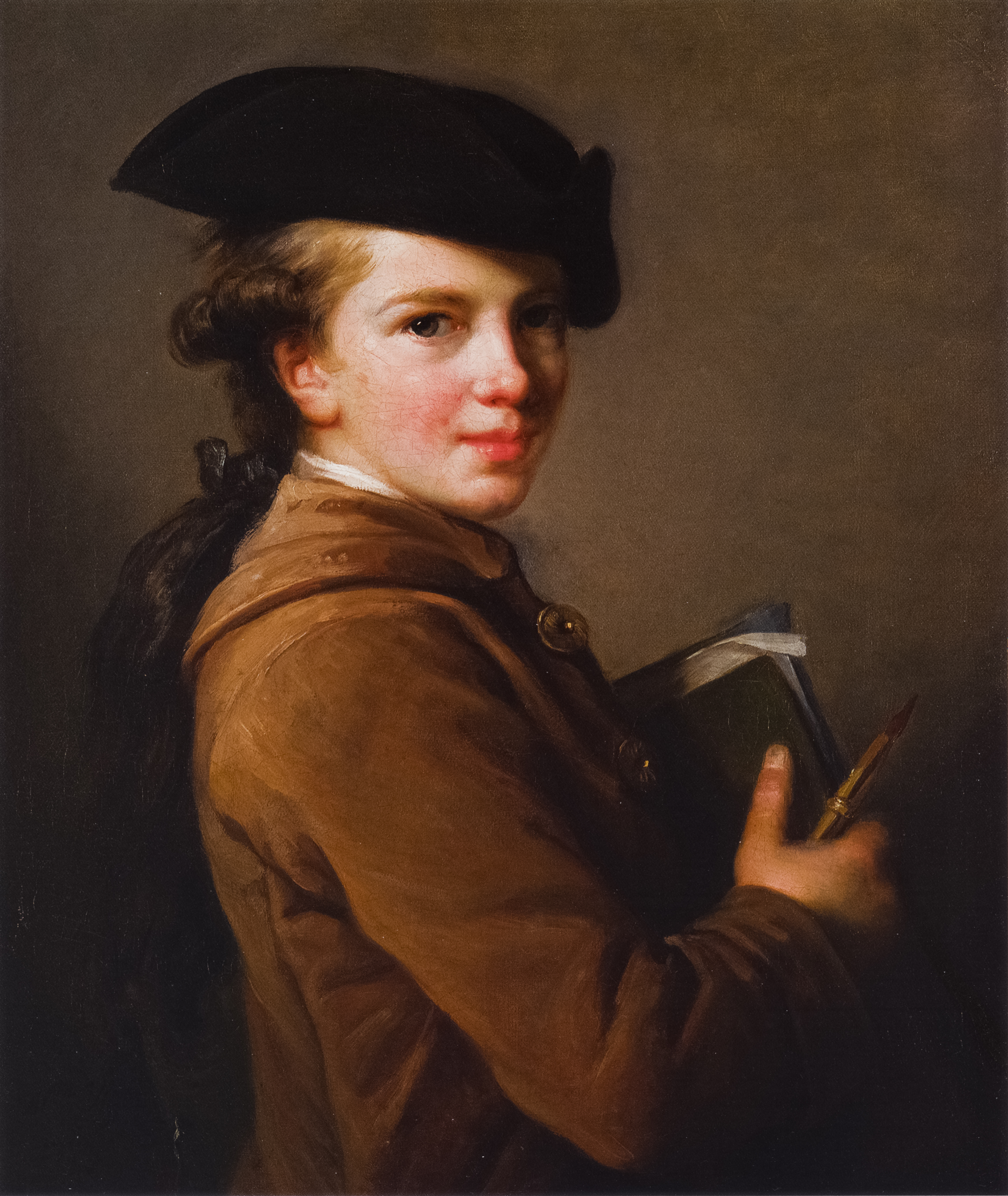
Étienne Vigée, 1773, painted by his sister

Louis-Jean-Baptiste-Étienne Vigée (2 December 1758 – 8 August 1820) was a French playwright and man of letters. He was also related to a great number of famous painters and artists.

== Early life and family ==
Born into an artistic family, he was the son of the hairdresser Jeanne Masin (1728-1800) and pastellist Louis Vigée (2 February 1715– 9 May1767) and the brother of the painter Élisabeth Vigée (16 April 1755 – 30 March 1842). He married Suzanne Marie Françoise Rivière (19 June 1764 – 8 June 1811), and they had one daughter; Charlotte Jeanne Élisabeth Louise Caroline ( 1791– 28 November 1864)

Caroline married her maternal uncle, also a painter, Jean Nicolas Louis Rivière (27 August 1778 – 13 April 1861) in 1809, aged only eighteen. They had five children:

1. Caroline Louise Léonie Rivière (16 December 1809 – 9 May1897), married the Comte de Masclary and had two daughters.
2. Léonce Georges Rivière (10 August 1811 – 22 February 1896), 5th Baron de Rivière.
3. Xavérine Rivière (12 August 1815 – 17 August 1852), married Robert de Chazal, and had four daughters.
4. Alfred Rivière (3 October 1818 – 22 November 1893), a lieutenant.
5. Xaverine Louise Amélie Rivière (1822– 17 March 1881)

== Career ==
Vigée was popular in the salons for his personality. He was employed as a secretary to Marie Joséphine of Savoy, the comtesse de Provence, wife of future King Louis XVIII, and sister-in-law of King Louis XVI and Marie Antoinette.

He wrote poetry in praise of the French Revolution, although his enthusiasm quickly faded and he was at one point arrested as a Girondist. He lived long enough to write poetry both in praise of Napoleon and Louis XVIII following the Bourbon Restoration.

He succeeded Sautreau de Marsy as editor of the poetry magazine Almanach des Muses from 1794 until 1820, and replaced Jean-François de La Harpe at the Lycée, but had nowhere near the same success as a teacher.

As a playwright, he was an imitator of Claude Joseph Dorat and Jean-Baptiste-Louis Gresset; he put together several plays over his career. [see: works]

== Honours ==
He was appointed a Knight of the Legion of Honour (Chevalier de la Légion d'honneur).

== Works ==
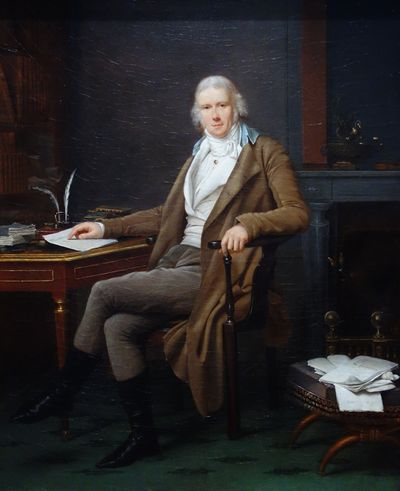
Portrait of Étienne Vigée in his study by Adèle Romany, 1800

=== Plays ===
- Les Aveux difficiles (1783), one act in verse
- La Fausse coquette (1784), three acts in verse
- Les Amants timides (1785)
- La Belle-Mère, ou les Dangers d’un second mariage (1788), five acts in verse
- L’Entrevue (1788), one act in verse
- Le Projet extravagant (1792)
- La Matinée d’une jolie femme (1792)
- La Vivacité à l’épreuve (1793)
- Ninon de Lenclos (1797)
- La Princesse de Babylone (1815)

A sample can be found in Bibliothèque dramatique (1824).

=== Other ===
- Manuel de littérature (Paris, 1809, duodecimo)
- La Tendresse filiale, poem (Paris, 1812, sextodecimo)
- Poésies, first published with Poèmes by Legouvé (1799, octavo), then alone (5th ed. Paris, 1813, octodecimo)
- Procès et mort de Louis XVI, fragments d’un poème (Paris, 1814, octavo)
- Le Pour et le Contre, dialogue en vers (Paris, 1818, octavo)

== Bibliography ==
- Élisabeth Vigée, Souvenirs, Paris, H. Fournier, 1835, 3 vol. octavo
- Gustave Vapereau, Dictionnaire universel des littératures, Paris, Hachette, 1876, p. 2032
