= Palamède de Forbin =

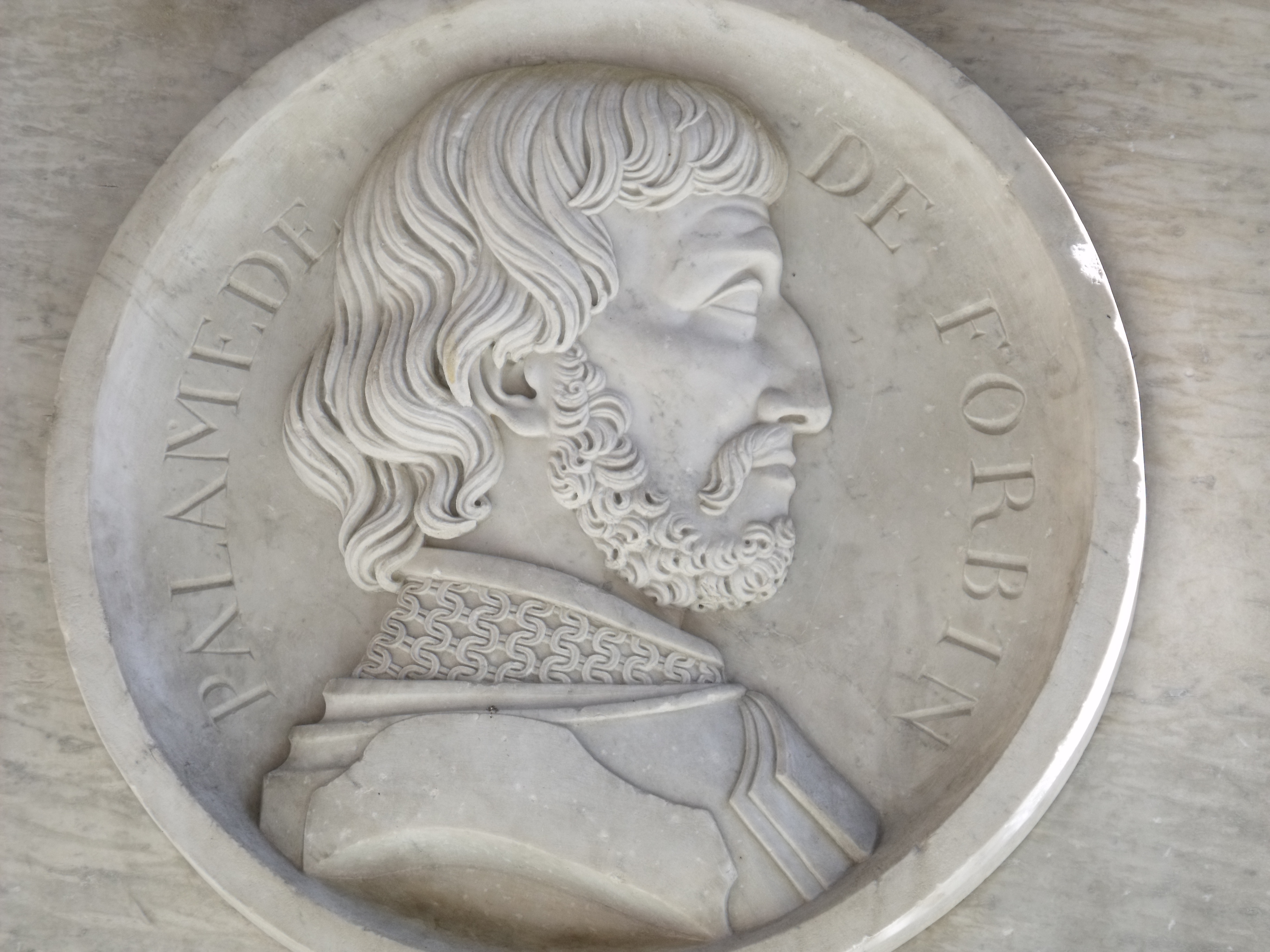
Palamède de Forbin

Pierre-Henri Révoil, René d'Anjou and Palamède de Forbin, c. 1827, a typically inconsequential anecdotal style troubadour scene, commissioned by a descendant of Forbin. Anjou has drawn a profile of Forbin on the door.

Palamède de Forbin (died 1508), seigneur of Solliès, nicknamed "the Great", was president of the Chambre des comptes and counsellor to René d'Anjou. He helped this prince decide to cede his estates to Louis XI. Louis then became his master, and made him governor of Provence in 1481.
