= Barthélemy Imbert =

18th-century French playwright, poet and novelist

- Born: 16 March 1747; Nîmes, France
- Died: 23 August 1790 (aged 43); Paris, France
- Occupations: Playwright; Poet; Novelist

Barthélemy Imbert (16 March 1747 – 23 August 1790) was an 18th-century French playwright, poet and novelist.

After his studies in his home town, Nîmes, Imbert moved to Paris where he made his reputation with The Judgment of Pâris, a poem in four songs in verses of ten syllables, published in 1772. A clever plan, a pleasant facility, a graceful elegance, made a quick success to this work. The author then wrote comedies, tragedies, novels, fables and tales in verse and prose, which fell into oblivion.

== Works ==
- 1770: Poinsinet et Molière, dialogue dédié à M. Piron
- 1771: Thérèse Danet à Euphémie, héroïde
- 1772: Le Jugement de Pâris, poëme en VI chants. Œuvres mêlées, pièces fugitives, fables
- 1773: Fables nouvelles, dédiées à Madame la Dauphine
- 1773: Élégie sur la mort de M. Piron
- 1774: Historiettes, ou Nouvelles en vers
- 1774: Lettre d'une religieuse à la Reine
- 1776: Les Bienfaits du sommeil, ou les Quatre rêves accomplis, poème en quatre chants Text online
- 1776: Les Égaremens de l'amour, ou Lettres de Fanéli et de Milfort, 2 vol.
- 1777: Œuvres poétiques, 2 vol.
- 1782: Lecture du matin, ou Nouvelles historiettes en prose
- 1783: Lectures variées, ou Bigarrures littéraires
- 1788: Choix de fabliaux mis en vers, 2 vol.
- 1806: Contes moraux'', 2 vol.

Theatre

- 1777: Gabrielle de Passi, parody of Gabrielle de Vergi, in 1 act, in prose and in vaudevilles, with Louis d'Ussieux, Théâtre italien de Paris, 30 August.
- 1778: Fanéli, ou les Égaremens de l'amour, five-act drama
- 1779: Le Lord anglois et le chevalier françois, comedy in one act and in free verse, Théâtre italien de Paris, 23 December
- 1781: Le Jaloux sans amour, comedy in 5 acts and in free verse, Théâtre italien de Paris, 8 January
- 1782: L'Inauguration du Théâtre français, one-act play in verse, Théâtre-Français, 9 April
- 1789: La Fausse apparence, ou le Jaloux malgré lui, comedy in 3 acts and in verse, Théâtre-Français, 24 April Text online
- 1781: Les Deux sylphes, comedy in 1 act and in verse, mingled with ariettes, Comédiens italiens, 18 October
- 1789: Marie de Brabant, reine de France, tragedy in 5 acts and in verse, Théâtre-Français, 9 September Text online

Literary critic

- 1778–1788: Annales poétiques ou Almanach des muses
- 1793: Réflexions sur un article du premier Mercure de janvier 1776

== Bibliography ==
- Velay, Serge; Boissard, Michel; Bernié-Boissard, Catherine (2009). Petit dictionnaire des écrivains du Gard (in French). Nîmes: Alcide. p. 125=255. Archived from the original on 2015-07-23.
