= Vige =

Vige or Vigé may refer to:

== People ==
- Vige Langevin (1898–1992), born Edwige Grandjouan, French artist, writer, and educator
- Gaëtan Vigé, French mountain biker, 2018 French National Mountain Bike Championships downhill champion
- Silje Vige (born 1976), Norwegian singer
- Theodore Vigé (1867–?), French entomologist

== Other uses ==
- Vige, a community in Vieux Fort District, Saint Lucia
- Vige or Viemo language, spoken in Burkina Faso

== See also ==
- Vigée, a French surname
