= Discourse on Inequality =

1755 treatise by Jean-Jacques Rousseau

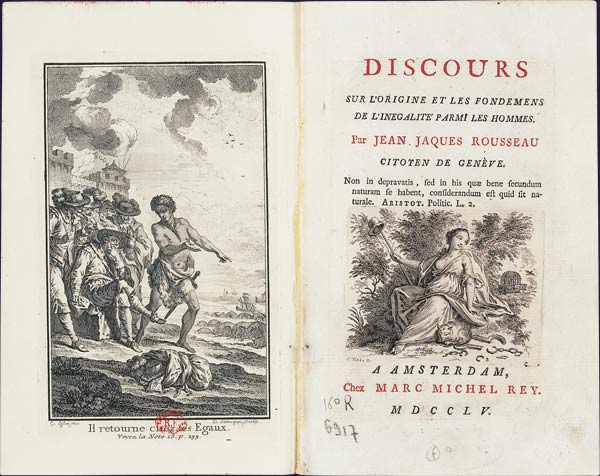
Frontispiece and title page of an edition of Rousseau's Discourse on Inequality (1754), published by Marc-Michel Rey in 1755 in Holland.

Discourse on the Origin and Basis of Inequality Among Men (French: Discours sur l'origine et les fondements de l'inégalité parmi les hommes), also commonly known as The Second Discourse, is a 1755 treatise by philosopher Jean-Jacques Rousseau, on the topic of social inequality and its origins. The work was written in 1754 as Rousseau's entry in a competition by the Academy of Dijon, and was published in 1755.

Rousseau first exposes in this work his conception of a human state of nature and of human perfectibility, an early idea of progress. He then explains the way in which, in his view, people may have established civil society, and this leads him to conclude that private property is the original source and basis of all inequality.

== Context ==
The text was written in 1754 in response to a prize competition of the Academy of Dijon, answering the prompt: "What is the origin of inequality among people, and is it authorized by natural law?" As with his Discourse on the Arts and Sciences, Rousseau answered in the negative. He did not win with his treatise (as he had for the Discourse on the Arts and Sciences); a canon of Besançon by the name of François Xavier Talbert (l'abbé Talbert) did. The Discourse on Inequality was written in part to contradict the claims made by Locke, Hobbes, and Pufendorf in their discussions of the state of nature. Rousseau published the text in 1755.

== Argument ==
Rousseau's text is divided into four main parts: the dedication, the preface, an extended inquiry into the nature of the human being and another inquiry into the evolution of the human species within society. It also includes an appendix that elaborates primarily on eighteenth century anthropological research throughout the text. Rousseau discusses two types of inequality: natural, or physical inequality, and ethical, or moral inequality. Natural inequality involves differences between one human's body and that of another—it is a product of nature. Rousseau is not concerned with this type of inequality because he claims it is not the root of the inequality found in civil society. Instead, he argues moral inequality is unique to civil society and is evinced in differences in "wealth, nobility or rank, power and personal merit." This type of inequality is established by convention. Rousseau appears to take a cynical view of civil society, where man has strayed from his "natural state" of individual independence and freedom to satisfy his individual needs and desires.

His discussion begins with an analysis of a natural man who bears, along with some developed animal species, instincts for self-preservation—a non-destructive love of self (amour de soi)—and a "natural repugnance" to suffering—a natural pity or compassion (pitié). Natural man acts only for his own sake and avoids conflicts with other animals (and humans). Rousseau's natural man is more or less like any other animal, with "self-preservation being his chief and almost sole concern" and "the only goods he recognizes in the universe" being food, a female, and sleep... Rousseau's man is a "savage" man. He is a loner and self-sufficient. Any battle or skirmish was only to protect himself. The natural man was in prime condition, fast, and strong, capable of caring for himself. He killed only for his own self-preservation.

Natural man's anthropological distinction (from the animal kingdom) is based on his capacity for "perfectibility" and innate sense of his freedom. The former, although translated as "perfectibility," has nothing to do with a drive for perfection or excellence, which might confuse it with virtue ethics. Instead, perfectibility describes how humans can learn by observing others. Human freedom does not mean the capacity to choose, which would require reason, but instead the ability to refrain from instinct. Only with such a capacity can humans acquire new habits and practices.

The most important feature of Rousseau's natural man is that he lacks reason, in contrast to most of the Western intellectual tradition. Rousseau claims natural man does not possess reason or language (in which reason's generation is rooted) or society—and these three things are mutually-conditioning, such that none can come into being without the others.

Rousseau's natural man significantly differs from, and is a response to, that of Hobbes; Rousseau says as much at various points throughout his work. He thinks that Hobbes conflates human being in the state of nature with human being in civil society. Unlike Hobbes's natural man, Rousseau's is not motivated by fear of death because he cannot conceive of that end; thus fear of death already suggests a movement out of the state of nature. Also, this natural man, unlike Hobbes's, is not in constant state of fear and anxiety. Rousseau's natural man possesses a few qualities that allow him to distinguish himself from the animals over a long period of time.

The process by which natural man becomes civilized is uncertain in the Discourse, but it could have had two or three different causes. The most likely causes are environmental, such that humans came into closer proximity and began cohabitation, which in turn facilitated the development of reason and language. Equally, human "perfectibility" could explain this change in the nature of the human being. Rousseau is not really interested in explaining the development, but acknowledges its complexity.

What is important is that with primitive social existence (preceding civil society), humans gain amour propre ("self-esteem", "self-love", or "vanity") and most of the rest of Rousseau's account is based on this. Rousseau's critique of civil society is primarily based on psychological features of civil man, with amour propre pushing individuals to compare themselves with others, to gain a sense of self corresponding to this, and to dissolve natural man's natural pity: "the savage lives within himself, sociable man, always outside himself, can only live in the opinion of others". For Rousseau, amour propre did not exist in the state of nature - amour de soi and pitié were enough to ensure survival.

The beginning of part two dramatically imagines some lone errant soul planting the stakes that first establish private property: "The first person who, having enclosed a plot of land, took it into his head to say this is mine and found people simple enough to believe him, was the true founder of civil society". But Rousseau then clarifies that this moment was presaged by a series of environmental and rational conditions that made it possible. For Rousseau, even the concept of private property required a series of other concepts in order to be formed.

The inequality that began with the establishment of private property was progressively exacerbated into slavery, despotism, and corruption. Rousseau asserted that the stage of human development associated with what he called "savages" was the best or optimal in human development, between the less-than-optimal extreme of brute animals on the one hand and the extreme of decadent civilization on the other. "...[N]othing is so gentle as man in his primitive state, when placed by nature at an equal distance from the stupidity of brutes and the fatal enlightenment of civil man". Rousseau argues that it is not possible to return to the state of nature. He did believe, however, that it was possible to correct some of the mistakes that were made in the transition to civilisation. Rousseau returned to this theme in The Social Contract.

== Dedication ==
The work is dedicated to the state of Geneva, Rousseau's birthplace. On the face of the dedication, he praises Geneva as a good, if not perfect, republic. The qualities he picks out for praise include the stability of its laws and institutions, the community spirit of its inhabitants, and its good relations with neighboring states, neither threatening them nor threatened by them, and the well-behaved women of Geneva. However, this is not how Geneva truly was. This is the type of regime Rousseau wished for. The epistle dedicatory is a highly ironic and idealized version of the Geneva Rousseau really wanted. Also, his description is in great contrast with Paris, where he had spent many years previous to writing this discourse, and which he had left bitterly. Thus, his description of Geneva is in part a statement against Paris.

== Analysis ==
The Second Discourse has prompted varying interpretations, particularly regarding Rousseau's views on the state of nature. In the work, Rousseau describes the state of nature as "a state which no longer exists, which perhaps never existed, which probably never will exist, and yet about which it is necessary to have accurate notions in order to judge properly our own present state." According to one view, Rousseau's account of the state of nature is no more than a philosophical device to separate the natural and artificial parts of human psychology. Another view holds that Rousseau approached the transition from nature to society as a historical reality. According to David Wootton, Rousseau was the first social contract theorist to take this approach, whereas preceding theorists treated the state of nature as a theoretical, not historical, condition that exists where government is absent (e.g. on the open ocean). A third interpretation asserts that Rousseau intended his account of the state of nature as "a fiction or myth" which would make its readers nostalgic for a past which never existed.

== Translations ==
- First English translation: John James Rousseau [i.e., Jean-Jacques Rousseau] (1761). A Discourse upon the Origin and Foundation of the Inequality among Mankind. By John James Rousseau, Citizen of Geneva. London: Printed for R[obert] and J[ames] Dodsley, in Pallmall. OCLC 1015508300.
