= Louis d'Ussieux =

- Born: Louis Dussieux; 30 March 1744; Angoulême
- Died: 21 August 1805 (aged 61); Saint-Maurice-Saint-Germain, Eure-et-Loir
- Occupations: Historian, journalist, translator, agronomist

Louis d'Ussieux, real name Louis Dussieux, (30 March 1744 in Angoulême – 21 August 1805 in château des Vaux, Eure-et-Loir) was an 18th-century French writer, historian, journalist, translator and agronomist.

In 1777, he was among the founders and editors of the Journal de Paris and collaborated with the Collection universelle des mémoires particuliers relatifs à l'histoire de France. A Girondin, he was banned before being elected in 1795 a member of the Council of Ancients until 1799.

== Works ==
- 1770: Histoire abrégée de la découverte et de la conquête des Indes par les Portugais
- 1772–1774: Le Décaméron français, 2 vol. Text online 1 2

Tome 1 : I. Henriette et Luci, ou les Amies rivales, nouvelle écossaise. II. Jeanne Gray, anecdote anglaise. III. Berthold, prince de Moravie, anecdote historique Text online. IV. Clémence d'Entragues, ou le Siège d'Aubigny, anecdote française. V. Élizène, anecdote ottomane.
Tome 2 : VI. Les Princes d'Arménie, nouvelle Text online. VII. Jean sans Peur, duc de Bourgogne, nouvelle française Text online. VIII. Raymond et Mariane, nouvelle portugaise Text online. IX. Roger et Victor de Sabran, nouvelle française Text online. X. Thélaïre, nouvelle mexicaine Text online.

- 1774: Les Héros français, ou le Siège de Saint-Jean-de-Lone, drame héroïque in 3 actes et en prose, suivi d'un Précis historique de cet événement Text online
- 1777: Gabrielle de Passi, parodie de Gabrielle de Vergi, en un acte, en prose et en vaudevilles, avec Barthélemy Imbert, Théâtre italien de Paris, 30 August
- 1783: Les Nouvelles françaises, 3 vol.
- 1786: Bibliothèque universelle des dames. Botanique, 2 vol.
- 1801: Traité théorique et pratique sur la culture de la vigne, avec l'art de faire le vin, les eaux-de-vie, esprit de vin, vinaigres, with Antoine Parmentier and Jean-Antoine Chaptal, 2 vol. Text online 1 2

Translations

- 1770: Christoph Martin Wieland: Le Nouveau Don Quichotte
- 1771: Christoph Martin Wieland: Contes comiques Text online
- 1771: Christoph Martin Wieland: Les Grâces
- 1772: Collectif : Nouvelles espagnoles, traduites de différentes auteurs, 2 vol.
- 1775–1783: Ludovico Ariosto: Roland furieux, 4 vol.
- 1786: Christoph Martin Wieland: Les Aventures merveilleuses de Don Silvio de Rosalva

== Bibliography ==
- "Louis d'Ussieux", in Adolphe Robert and Gaston Cougny, Dictionnaire des parlementaires français (1789–1891), Bourloton, Paris, 1889 Edition details Wikisource
- Dictionnaire des Journalistes, sous la dir. de Jean Sgard, Voltaire Foundation, Oxford, 1999, notice n° 789 rédigée par Nicole Brondel.
- Roger Caratini, Dictionnaire des personages de la Révolution
