= Charles-Pierre Colardeau =

French poet (1732–1776)

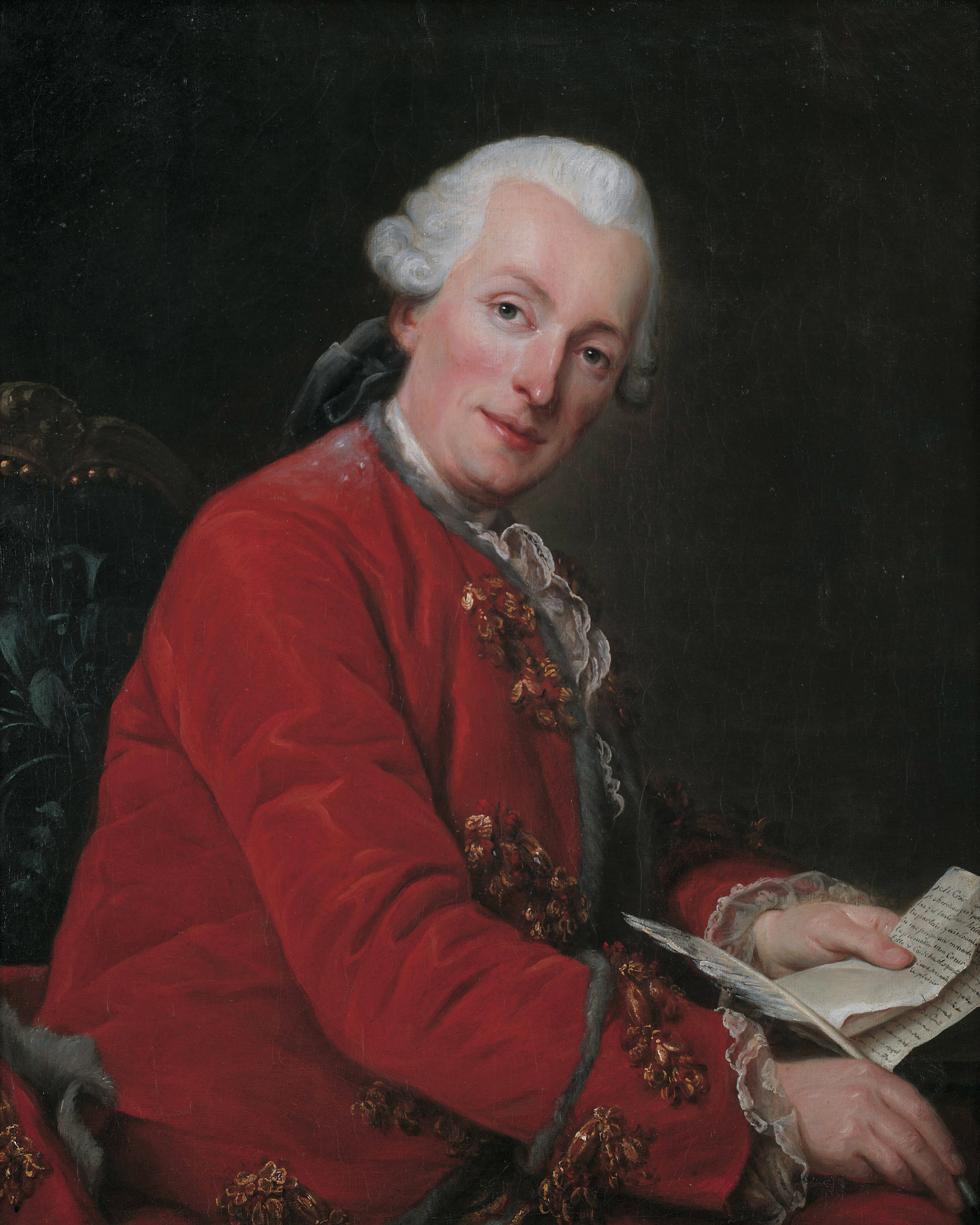
- Born: 12 October 1732; Janville, France
- Died: 7 April 1776 (aged 43); Paris, France
- Writing career
- Genres: poetry drama
- Notable work: Lettre d'Héloïse à Abailard

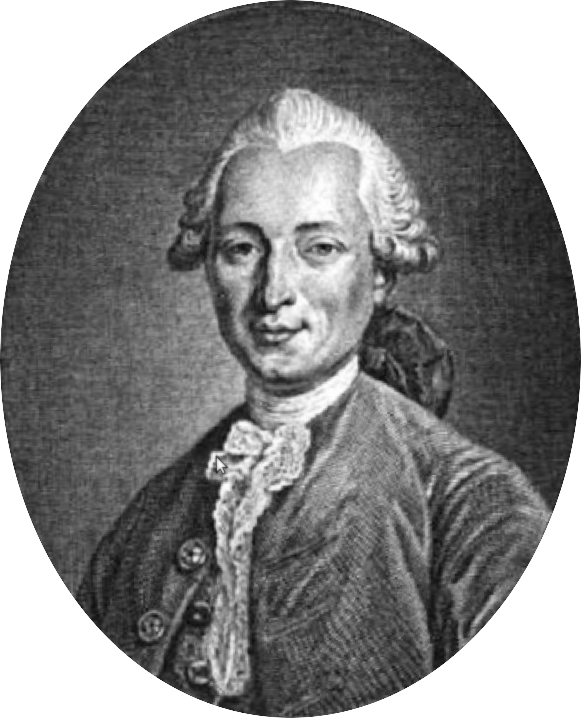

Charles-Pierre Colardeau (12 October 1732 in Janville – 7 April 1776 in Paris) was a French poet. His most notable works are an imitation of Eloisa to Abelard by Alexander Pope and a translation of the first two sections of Night-Thoughts by Edward Young. They witness to the pre-Romantic sensibility of the 18th century, as also seen in the works of Rousseau, Diderot and Prévost. He also naturalized Ovid's term. Heroides, as 'héroïdes', imaginary poetic letters by famous people. The relatively small size of his œuvre is attributed by some to his fragile health (he died aged only 43) and by others to proverbial laziness.

== Life and work ==
=== Early life ===
Charles-Pierre Colardeau was the son of Charles Colardeau, collector of salt warehouse of Janville and his wife Jeanne Regnard. Orphaned at age 13, he was raised by his maternal uncle, pastor of Pithiviers who sent him to the college of Meung-sur-Loire to complete the humanities that he had begun with the Jesuits of Orléans. Then he came to his philosophy at College of Beauvais in Paris and then returned to Pithiviers.

His uncle had got him a position as a secretary to a lawyer at the Parliament of Paris, with the intention to prepare for the study of law and the legal profession. Colardeau then returned to the capital in 1753 but remained there for only a short time as his health faltered and he had to return to Pithiviers where he indulged his penchant for poetry, translated into verse fragments of holy scripture, undertook the writing of his tragedies Nicephore and Astarbé, the subject of the first having been taken from the Bible and that of the second from the Aventures de Télémaque (Adventures of Telemachus) of Fénelon .

=== Literary career ===
In 1755, with the recall of the Parliaments, Colardeau was able to return to Paris where he finished his tragedy Astarbé which he read to the Comédiens-Français in July 1756. Before the welcome given to his work, he decided to abandon the law to devote himself entirely to his literary career. Astarbé however, was not performed immediately, and the assassination of Damiens led Colardeau to withdraw it, however, he composed an imitation of Pope's Eloisa to Abelard, which was a great success and made him immediately famous.

Astarbé was eventually performed in April 1758 and was well received. The same year, continuing in the vein of verse epistles, Colardeau produced an héroïde entitled Armide à Renaud.

His second tragedy, Calista, represented in 1760, had some success through the talent of Mademoiselle Clairon but provoked critical comments, particularly because of its scabrous subject (rape). Colardeau undertook a translation into French of Torquato Tasso's Jerusalem Delivered, but he destroyed the manuscript before his death. He then tried his hand at a translation of Virgil's Aeneid which he abandoned when he heard that Father Delille was working on an identical project.

In 1762, his poem Patriotism brought him to the attention of the Duc de Choiseul and earned him a biting satire to which he responded in his Epître à Minette (Letter to Minette).

Returned to Pithiviers in 1766, he wrote a comedy in five acts and in verse, Les perfidies à la mode, which was not performed. In 1770, he put into verse the first two parts of Edward Young's Night-Thoughts, whose French translation had just been published. In 1772 he published a Temple de Gnide composed a decade earlier, adapted from Montesquieu, as the poem by Nicolas-Germain Léonard appeared shortly before. In 1774 he published his Epître à M. Duhamel de Denainvilliers (Letter to Mr. Duhamel Denainvilliers) on the charms of the countryside and a descriptive poem Les Hommes de Prométhée (The Men of Prometheus) which describes the awakening of romantic love in the first two human beings.

=== Family life ===
The Mémoires Secrets pour servir à l'histoire de la République des Lettres en France attributed the death of the writer to a venereal disease contracted during a fleeting relationship with a "courtesan ungrateful and treacherous". The siren that Mémoires ... designate as Demoiselle Verrières would be Marie Rinteau, called Marie Verrières or De Verrières . Marie and her sister had a welcoming house at Auteuil and provided a beautiful theatre. A liaison with Maurice de Saxe produced a girl born in 1748, Aurore, who became the grandmother of George Sand. Marie was unable to make provisions for her education and the Dauphine took Aurore from her mother to be educated in a convent: after the death of Marshal Saxe (1750) Marie's name is associated in the chronicles of the time with a number of gentlemen among whom there is the enduring presence of Denis Joseph Lalive d'Epinay, from a family of fermiers généraux, husband of Louise d'Epinay (who was a lover of Louis Dupin Francueil Aurore, future husband and grandfather of George Sand). The romance of Marie with Colardeau—a penniless poet—was an all too brief interlude, and poor Charles-Pierre was first requested "to leave for two years" to make way for a richer protector and then finally returned to his desk. The chronicle of Mémoires ... for the year of his death informs us that, once convinced of his disgrace, Charles-Pierre circulated in Paris a "bloody satire" in which Marie was cruelly treated.

Colardeau lived for several years up to his death—as did many penniless writers of his time—in the house of an aristocrat, the Marquise de Viéville, of whom the Mémoires ... say "she was a woman of wit and philosophy, adding that "the rumor was that she had married or would marry him (Colardeau)". It seems that the marquise fought hard to get her poet made a member of the Académie française but bear in mind that—again according to the authors of Mémoires ...—Colardeau had a reputation in the world of letters for writing very little but to be the best versifier in France.

In January 1776, Colardeau succeeded Duc de Saint-Aignan in the Académie française. But he did not even have time to deliver his acceptance speech as he died on 7 April 1776, aged 43.

== Works ==
- Lettre d'Héloïse à Abailard, in imitation of Alexander Pope, (1756);
- Astarbé (1758), tragédie;
- Armide à Renaud (1758);
- Caliste (1760), tragédie;
- Le Patriotisme (1762);
- Epître à Minette (1762);
- Les Perfidies à la Mode (1766), comédie;
- Les Nuits d'Young (1770);
- Le Temple de Gnide (1772);
- Epître à M. Duhamel de Denainvilliers (1774);
- Les Hommes de Prométhée (1774).

His works form 2 volumes in-8, 1779.

== Bibliography ==
- Renata Carocci, Les Héroïdes dans la seconde moitié du XVIIIe siecle, Fasano et Paris, Schena-Nizet, 1988
- [Pierre Jabineau de la Voûte], « Vie de M. Colardeau », in : Œuvres de Colardeau, Paris, Billard et Le Jay, 1779, 2 vol.
- Jean-Noël Pascal, La belle Pénitente (La belle Pénitente de Mauprié, Caliste de Colardeau), Presses Universitaires de Perpignan, 2001
