= François Xavier Talbert =

French preacher and writer (1725–1805)

François Xavier Talbert, dit l'abbé Talbert (1725, Besançon – 4 June 1805, Lviv, Ukraine), was an 18th-century French preacher and writer.

He was a canon in Besançon and later in Paris before emigrating to Ukraine where he died. Concurrently with Jean-Jacques Rousseau, he treated the question proposed by the Académie de Dijon on l'Origine de l'inégalité parmi les hommes (1754) and won the prize.

In addition to his Sermons, he wrote Éloges of Louis XV, Montaigne, Bossuet, Massillon and other great French figures, crowned by several academies.

He contributed the article "preux" (brave, gallant, doughty) to the Supplement of the Encyclopédie by Diderot and D’Alembert.

He was one of the founding members of the Académie des sciences, belles-lettres et arts de Besançon et de Franche-Comté.
