= Claude-Sixte Sautreau de Marsy =

French journalist and man of letters

Claude-Sixte Sautreau de Marsy (1740 – 8 May 1815) was a French journalist and man of letters.

He is best remembered for founding the Almanach des Muses in 1765. He wrote articles for the Année littéraire and other magazines; he edited the Selected Works (1786) of Dorat, the Mémoires secrets sur les règnes de Louis XIV et de Louis XV (1790), by Duclos, the letters of Madame de Maintenon (1800), and other publications.

== Publications ==
- Réflexions d’un homme de lettres, à un de ses amis retiré en province, sur la tragédie du Comte de Warvik ("Reflexions of a man of letters on the tragedy of the Comte de Warvik, addressed to one of his friends who had retired to the countryside"), Paris, Dans un caffé. 1763
- Almanach des muses ("Almanac of the muses"), Paris, Delalain, 1766-1833
- Éloge de Charles V, roi de France ("Eulogy of Charles V of France"), Geneva, 1767
- Nouvelle anthologie françoise ou choix des épigrammes & madrigaux de tous les poètes françois depuis Marot jusqu'à ce jour ("New French anthology of epigrams and madrigals by all the French poets from Marot to this day"), Paris, Delalain, 1769-1787, 2 vol.
- Recueil des meilleurs contes en vers (Perrault, Sénécé, Voltaire, Grécourt, etc.) ("Collection of the best tales in verse"), Geneva and Paris, Delalain, 1774-1784, 2 vol.
- Le Petit Chansonnier françois, ou, Choix des meilleures chansons, sur des airs connus ("The little French songster, or Selected best songs, on familiar airs"), Geneva and Paris, Veuve Duchesne, 1778-1780, 3 vol.
- Annales poétiques, depuis l’origine de la poésie française ("Poetical annals, from the beginnings of French poetry"), with Barthélemy Imbert, 1778-1788, 10 vol.
- Pièces écha[p]pées aux seize premiers almanachs des Muses ("Selected pieces from the first sixteen Muses' Almanacs"), Paris V, Duchêne, 1781
- Nouvelle bibliothèque de société, contenant des faits intéressans, des mélanges de littérature & de morale, des variétés historiques, un choix de bons mots, des poésies fugitives, des contes en vers & en prose, &c. ... ("New Social Cyclopedia, containing interesting facts, blends of literature and morals, historical medleys, a selection of witticisms, occasional poems, tales in verse and in prose, etc..."), London [etc.] Delalain l'aîné, 1782
- Poésies satyriques du dix-huitième siècle ("Satyric poems of the 18th century"), London (i.e. Paris, Cazin), 1782-1788, 2 vol.
- Tablettes d’un curieux, ou Variétés historiques, littéraires et morales ("Study-tables of an enquiring mind"), Brussels, Dujardin and Paris, Defer de Maisonneuve, 1789, 2 vol.
- Nouveau Siècle de Louis XIV, ou Poésies-anecdotes du règne et de la cour de ce prince; avec notes historiques et des éclairicissemens ("New Sun-King Century, or Poem-anecdotes of the reign and court of this prince"), with François-Joseph-Michel Noël, Paris, F. Buisson, 1793, 4 vol.

== Bibliography ==
- Gustave Vapereau, Dictionnaire universel des littératures, Paris, Hachette, 1876, p. 1347
