= Pierre-André Le Suire =

French painter

Pierre-André Le Suire (30 November 1742 – ?) was a French enameller. He married Justine de Corranson (born c.1753, Paris), who appears in issue 467 of the Livret du salon de 1791 as a miniature painter. There are very few documents on his existence and his work.

== Life ==
His father's brothers were the writer Robert-Martin Lesuire and Louis-Antoine-Bernard Le Suire the elder, first painter to the duchess of Kingston and Catherine II of Russia

According to his son Théodore, he was once deputy-director of the Manufacture de Sèvres, though he does not appear on the long lists of directors, employees and artists at that factory published by Champfleury. His son also stated he was accredited to the Académie royale de peinture, but the lists of accredited members and academicians again do not feature Le Suire's name. His son finally stated that he received a state pension.

== Works ==
A set of miniatures were bought from their longtime owner M. Bourgneuf for the Musées de Laval by Daniel Œhlert, curator of Laval's archaeology museum. M. Bourgneuf had bought them from an old serving was an amateur collector and had bought them from an old servant of Lesuire's son Théodore - the servant had been born in Saint-Barthélémy parish of Paris and died around 1840 in Laval. Most of them were signed by Le Suire or his wife.
