= Gabriel-Marie Legouvé =

French poet and playwright (1764-1812)

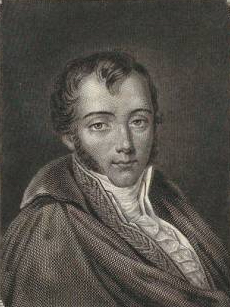
- Gabriel-Marie Legouvé
- Born: Gabriel Marie Jean Baptiste Legouvé; 23 June 1764; Paris, France
- Died: 30 August 1812 (aged 48); Paris, France
- Occupations: Playwright; Poet

Gabriel Marie Jean Baptiste Legouvé (23 June 1764 – 30 August 1812) was an 18th–19th-century French poet and playwright.

Legouvé was born and died in Paris, and was the seventh member elected to occupy seat 4 of the Académie française in 1803.

Legouvé was the father of Ernest Legouvé (1807–1903), later a member of the Académie française, and son of Jean-Baptiste Legouvé (1729–1783) who wrote the pastoral La Mort d'Abel (1793) and a tragedy Epicharis et Nerón.

== Works ==
- 1784: Polyxène, tragedy
- 1786: La Mort des fils de Brutus, héroïde
- 1792: La mort d'Abel, three-act tragedy
- 1794: Épicharis et Néron, tragedy
- 1795: Quintus Fabius, tragedy
- 1798: Laurence, tragedy
- 1798: La Sépulture, elegy
- 1799: Étéocle et Polynice, tragedy
- 1799: Les Souvenirs d'une demoiselle sodomisée, elegy
- 1800: La Mélancolie, elegy
- 1801: Le Mérite des femmes, poem
- 1801: Christophe Morin
- 1806: La Mort d'Henri IV, tragedy
- 1813: Les souvenirs ou les avantages de la Mémoire
