= Louis-Élisabeth de La Vergne de Tressan =

French soldier, physician, scientist, medievalist and writer

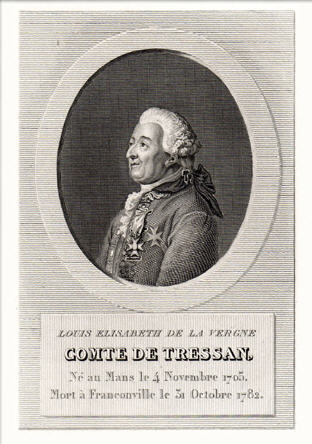
Porträt of Tressan. Engraving from Alexandre Desenne, 1824

Louis-Élisabeth de la Vergne, comte de Tressan (4 November 1705, Le Mans – 31 October 1783, from a fall from a carriage en route to Saint-Leu-la-Forêt) was a French soldier, physician, scientist, medievalist and writer, best known for his adaptations of "romans chevaleresques" of the Middle Ages, which contributed to the rise of the Troubadour style in the French arts.

== Biography ==
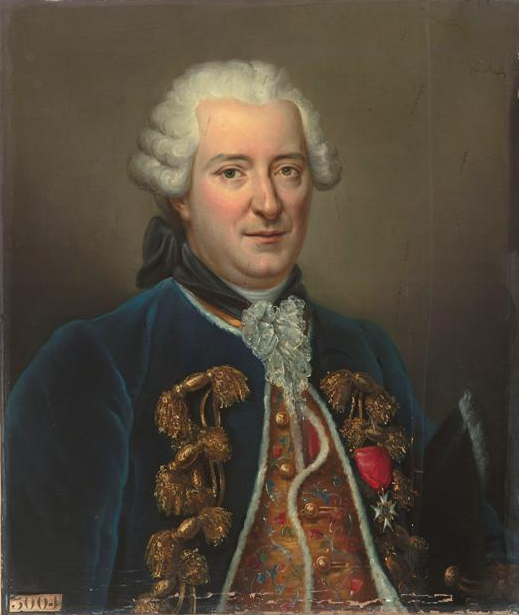
Louis-Élisabeth de la Vergne de Tressan

Aged 13, he was the companion of the young Louis XV; he served as an enseigne in the 1st Scottish company of the Gardes du Corps since 1735, being promoted to lieutenant in June 1743. He was with the king as his aide de camp at the battle of Fontenoy and became General-lieutenant in 1748. He was made governor of Toul and was summoned by king Stanislas to his court at Lunéville, where he received the title of grand marshal.

The first director of the Société Royale des Sciences et Belles-Lettres of Nancy in 1751 and a member of several other academies in France and abroad, he was elected a member of the Académie des sciences in 1749 and of the Académie française in 1780.

A friend of Voltaire and Buffon, he frequented the salon of Mme de Tencin and composed several odes as well as adaptations of chivalric romances, which he translated and adapted from Spanish and Old French, into editions which would be re-issued several times. He was also the author of one of the first treatises on electricity in French, and collaborated on volumes VII and XI of the Encyclopédie of Diderot and D’Alembert.

== Works ==
- Amadis de Gaule, traduction libre (1779)
- Roland furieux. Poème héroïque de l’Arioste (4 volumes, 1780)
- Essai sur le fluide électrique, considéré comme agent universel (2 volumes, 1786). Online text :
- Corps d’extraits de romans de chevalerie (4 volumes, 1782). Containing

I. Discours préliminaire sur les romans françois. Tristan de Léonois, fils de Meliadus. Artus de Bretagne. Flores et Blanche-Fleur. Cléomades et Claremonde (d’après Adenet le Roi). Extrait du Roman de la Rose, précédé d’une courte dissertation sur l’état de la littérature française sous les règnes de Louis VI, Louis VII, Philippe-Auguste, Louis VIII, S. Louis, Philippe le Hardi et Philippe le Bel; extrait du commencement du Roman de la Rose et des 4150 premiers vers qui nous sont restés de Guillaume de Loris. Pierre de Provence et la Belle Maguelone.
II. La Fleur des batailles, ou Histoire des hauts faits de Doolin de Mayence. Huon de Bordeaux. Guérin de Montglave.
III. Dom Ursino le Navarin et Dona Inès d’Oviédo. Histoire et plaisante chronique du petit Jehan de Saintré et de la Dame des Belles-cousines (after Antoine de La Sale). Les Apparences trompeuses, extrait de l’histoire du très noble et chevaleureux prince Gérard, comte de Nevers (after Gerbert de Montreuil).
IV. Recherches sur l’origine des romans inventés avant l’ère chrétienne. Histoire de Rigda et de Regner Lodbrog. Zélie, ou l’Ingénue.

- Le Chevalier Robert, ou Histoire de Robert surnommé le Brave (1800)
- Rose Summers, ou les Dangers de l’imprévoyance traduit librement de l’anglais (1805)
- Œuvres (8 volumes, 1822–23)
