= Troubadour style =

19th-century French historical painting

Pierre-Henri Révoil, René d'Anjou and Palamède de Forbin, c. 1827, a typically inconsequential anecdotal scene, in this case commissioned by a descendant of Forbin, whose features conveniently were recorded on a relief.

Taking its name from medieval troubadours, the Troubadour Style (French: Style troubadour) is a rather derisive term, in English usually applied to French historical painting of the early 19th century with idealised depictions of the Middle Ages and the Renaissance. In French it also refers to the equivalent architectural styles. It can be seen as an aspect of Romanticism and a reaction against Neoclassicism, which was coming to an end at the end of the Consulate, and became particularly associated with Josephine Bonaparte and Caroline Ferdinande Louise, duchesse de Berry. In architecture the style was an exuberant French equivalent to the Gothic Revival of the Germanic and Anglophone countries. The style related to contemporary developments in French literature, and music, but the term is usually restricted to painting and architecture.

== History ==
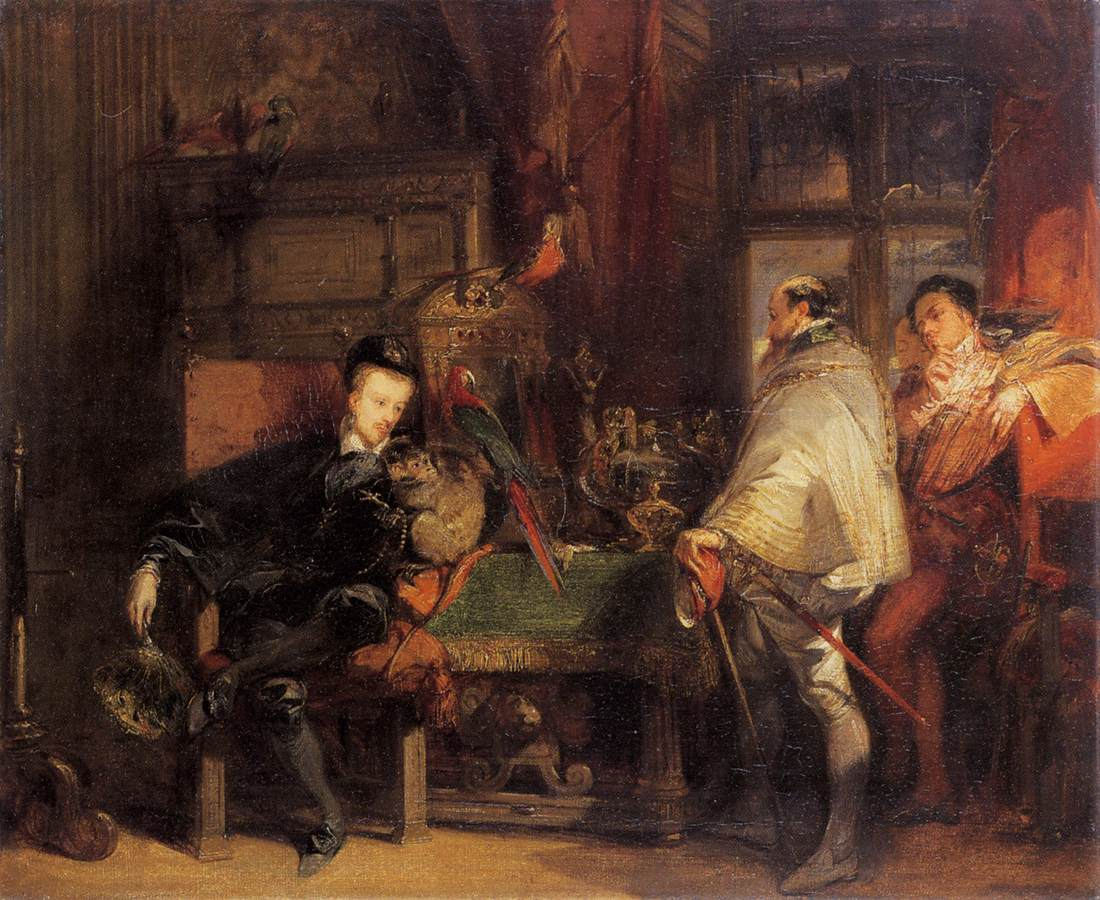
Richard Parkes Bonington, Henri III and the English Ambassador, 1827

The rediscovery of medieval civilization was one of the intellectual curiosities of the beginning of the 19th century, with much input from the Ancien Régime and its institutions, rites (the coronation ceremony dated back to the 16th century) and the medieval churches in which family ceremonies occurred.

Even while exhuming the remains of the kings and putting on the market a multitude of objects, works of art and elements of medieval architecture, the revolutionaries brought them back to life, it could be said. The Musée des Monuments français (Museum of French Monuments), established in the former convent that would become Paris's École nationale supérieure des Beaux-Arts, presented all this glorious debris of the Middle Ages as subjects of admiration for the public and as models of inspiration for students of the departments of engraving, painting and sculpture, but not those of architecture since teaching of this subject had been dissociated from the "beaux-arts" and placed in the École centrale des travaux publics under the direction of J.N.L Durand, a harsh promoter of the neoclassical architecture that characterized the styles of the Convention and Consulate. Later, from the Bourbon Restoration and under the impulse of Quatremère de Quincy and Mérimée, a new tradition of teaching architecture put it back under the fine arts umbrella, in the margins of the declining official school, beginning with private workshops that behaved as diocesan architects working for historic monuments that would give rise to the Société Centrale des Architectes and make Troubador-style architecture possible.

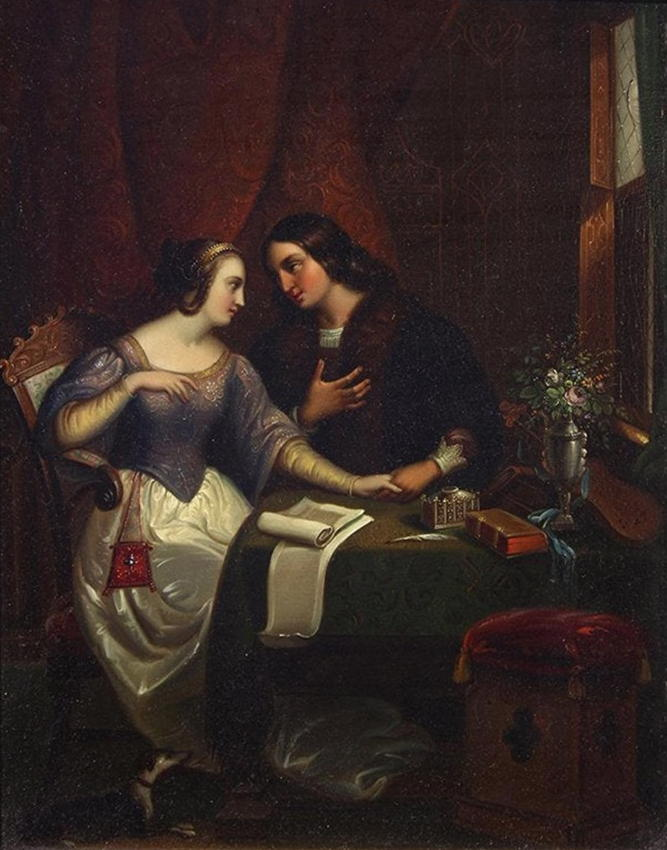
Jean-Baptiste Goyet, Héloïse et Abailard, oil on copper, 1829.

The resurgence of Christian feeling and in Christianity in the arts, with the publication in 1800 of Le Génie du Christianisme ('the Genius of Christianity'), played a major role in favour of edifying painting, sculpture and literature, often inspired by religion.

Artists and writers rejected the neo-antique rationalism of the French Revolution and turned towards a perceived glorious Christian past. The progress of the history and archaeology in the course of the 18th century began to bear fruit, at first, in painting. Paradoxically these painters of the past were unaware of the primitives of French painting, finding it too academic and not sufficiently filled with anecdote.

Napoleon himself did not disdain this artistic current: he took as his emblem the golden beehive on the grave of the Merovingian king Childeric I, rediscovered in the 17th century, and saw himself as the heir of the French monarchy. He also gave official recognition to the Middle Ages in the forms of his coronation, and tried to profit from other trappings of the medieval French kings, perhaps even their miraculous curative powers (Bonaparte visiting the plague-victims of Jaffa by Antoine-Jean Gros was read as a modern re-envisgaing of the thaumaturgical kings).

== Literature ==
Public interest in the Middle Ages in literature first manifested itself in France and above all England. In France, this came with the adaptation and publication from 1778 of ancient chivalric romances by the Comte de Tressan (1707–1783) in his Bibliothèque des romans, and in England with the first fantastical romances and gothic novels, such as The Castle of Otranto (1764). These English romances inspired late 18th-century French writers to follow suit, such as Donatien de Sade with his Histoire secrete d'Isabelle de Baviere, reine de France. The Le Troubadour, poésies occitaniques (1803) by Fabre d'Olivet popularized the term, and may have led to the naming of the style in art. The Waverley Novels of Walter Scott were hugely popular across Europe, and a major influence on both painting and French novelists such as Alexandre Dumas and Victor Hugo.

== Painting ==
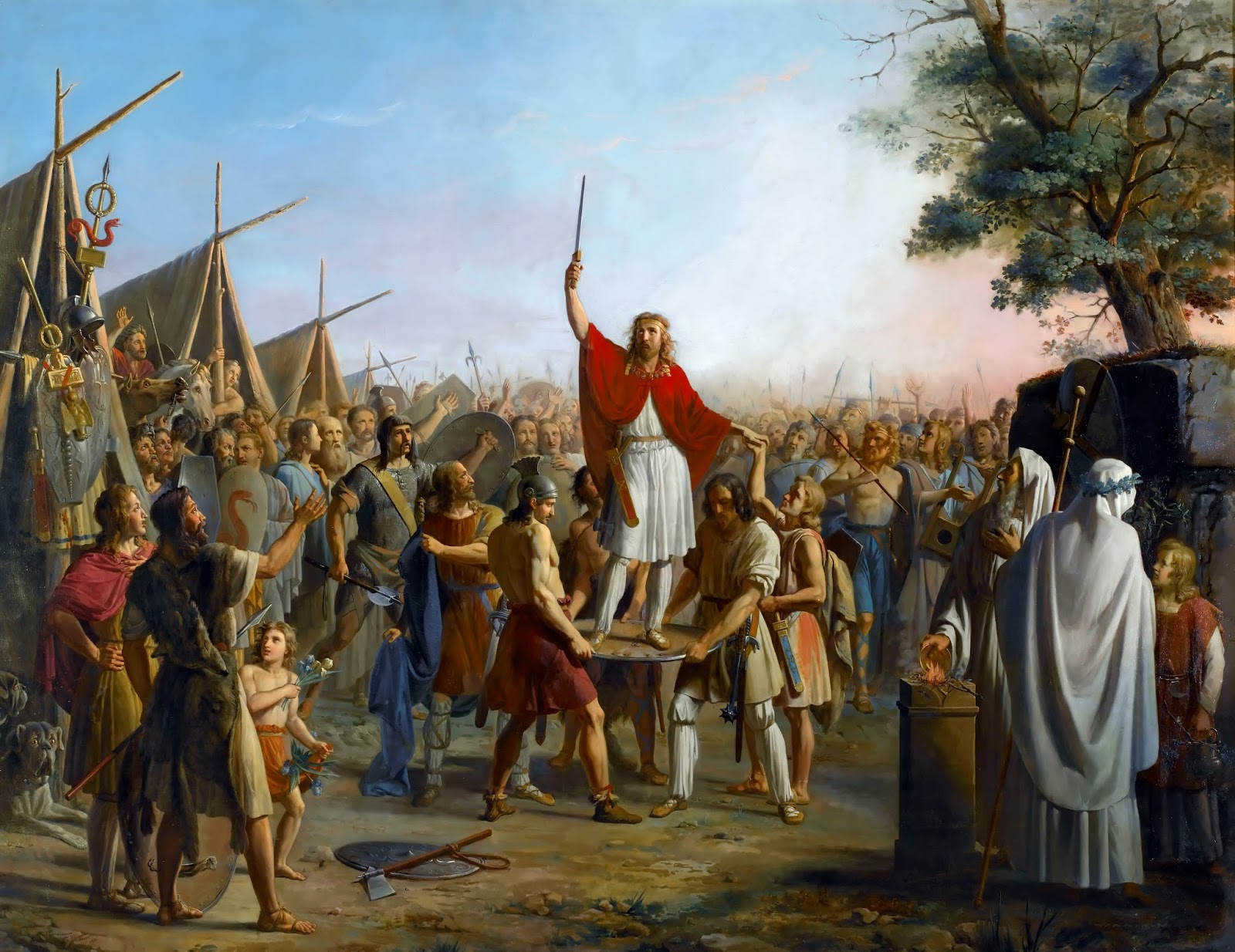
Pharamond lifted on a shield by the Franks, by Pierre-Henri Révoil and Michel Philibert Genod, 1845

In painting, the troubadour style was represented by history painting portraying edifying historical episodes, often borrowing its smoothness, its minute and illusionistic description of detail, its rendering of fabrics, the intimate character of its familiar scenes and its other technical means from Dutch Golden Age painting. The paintings were typically rather small cabinet paintings, often showing quiet intimate anecdotal moments rather than moments of high drama, though these were both depicted. As well as figures from political history, famous artists and authors of the past were often shown, especially Raphael and Dante. Ingres' Death of Leonardo da Vinci in the arms of King Francois I of France is one of several works bringing rulers and artists together. A number of paintings by Ingres are in the style, and lesser artists such as Pierre-Henri Révoil (1776–1842) and Fleury-François Richard (1777–1852) specialized in the style. The Belgian Henri Leys painted in a more sombre version of the style much influenced by Northern Renaissance painting. Richard Parkes Bonington is better remembered for his landscapes, but also painted in the style, as did Eugène Delacroix. The peak period was brought to an end by the Revolution of 1848, and later the arrival of Realism, although the style arguably merged into late 19th-century academic painting. The transition can be seen in the work of Paul Delaroche.

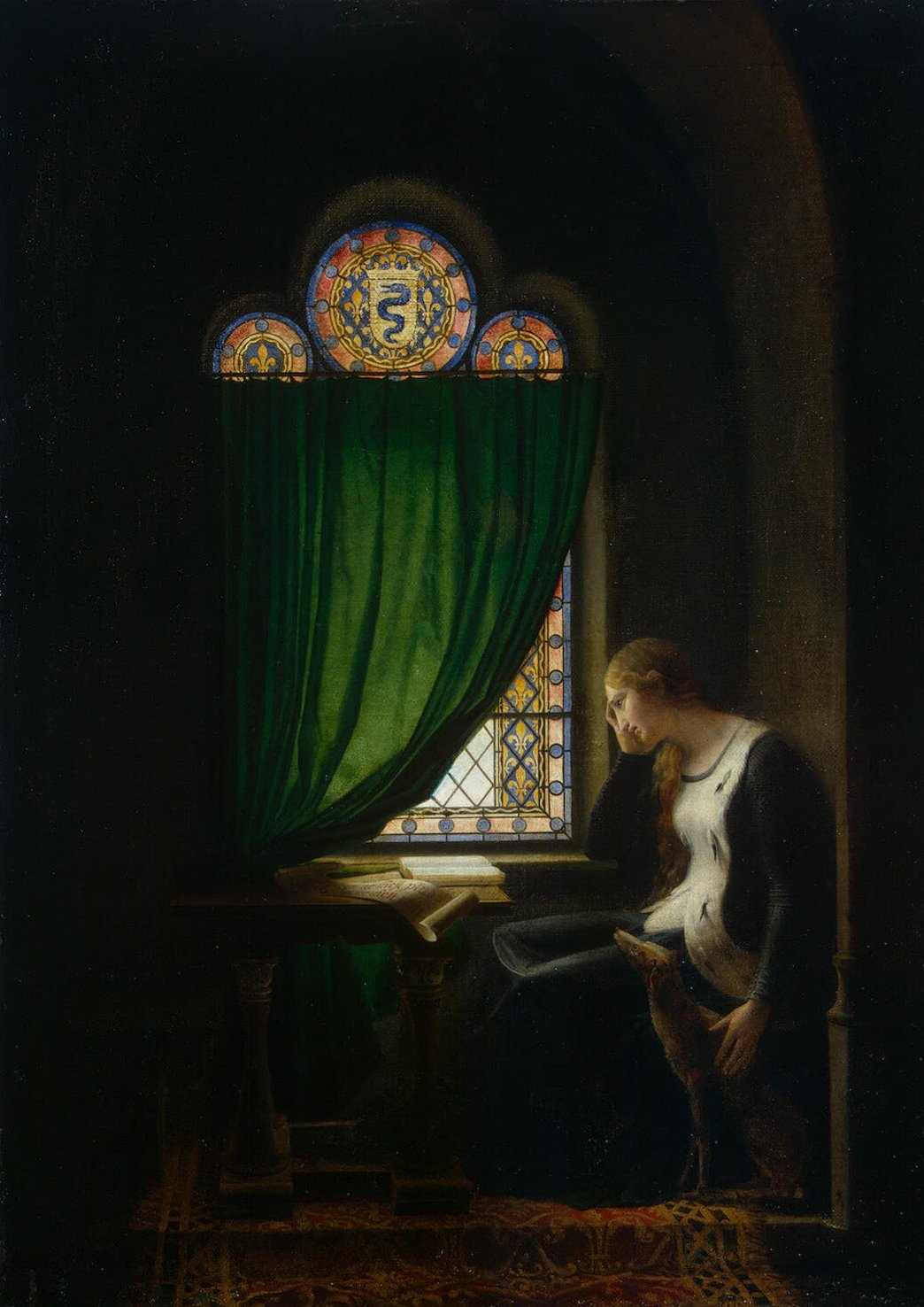
Valentine of Milan Mourning Her Husband the Duke of Orléans by François Fleury-Richard (c. 1802) Hermitage Museum, Saint-Petersburg

Arguably the first troubadour painting was presented at the Salon of 1802, under the French Consulate. It was a work by Fleury-Richard, Valentine of Milan weeping for the death of her husband, a subject which had come to the artist during a visit to the "musée des monuments français", a museum of French medieval monuments. A tomb from this museum was included in the painting as that of the wife. Thanks to its moving subject matter, the painting was an enormous success – seeing it, David cried "This resembles nothing anyone else has done, it's a new effect of colour; the figure is charming and full of expression, and this green curtain thrown across this window renders the illusion complete". Compositions lit from the back of the scene, with the foreground in semi-darkness, became rather a trademark of the early years of the style.

Fragonard's painting of François Premier reçu chevalier par Bayard (Francis I knighted by Bayard, Salon of 1819) has to be read not as a rediscovery of a medieval past, but as a memory of a recent monarchic tradition.

=== Examples ===
- Pierre-Nolasque Bergeret, Aretino in the studio of Tintoretto, Salon of 1822.
- Madame Cheradame, née Bertaud, The Education of Saint Louis.
- Michel Martin Drölling, The Last Communion of Marie-Antoinette, Paris, Conciergerie.
- Louis Ducis, Le Tasse reading a passage from his poem Jerusalem Delivered to Princess Éléonore d’Este, formerly in the collection of the Empress Joséphine. Arenenberg, Musée Napoléonien.
- Alexandre-Évariste Fragonard, Don Juan, Zerlina and Lady Elvira, Clermont-Ferrand, Musée des Beaux-arts.
- Alexandre-Évariste Fragonard, The time approaches.
- Alexandre-Evariste Fragonard, François Premier armé chevalier par Bayard (Francis I knighted by Bayard), Meaux, Musée Bossuet.
- Baron François Gérard, The Recognition of the Duke of Anjou as King of Spain, Château de Chambord.
- Hortense de Beauharnais, The Knight's Departure c.1812, Château de Compiègne, originally at the château de Pierrefonds.
- Jean-Auguste-Dominique Ingres, Francesco da Rimini and Paolo Malatesta, frame designed by Claude-Aimé Chenavard, (1789–1838), Angers, musée des Beaux-arts.
- Jean-Baptiste Isabey, A couple descending the staircase of the tourelle at the château d’Harcourt, Salon of 1827
- Alexandre Menjaud, Francis I and "la Belle Ferronnière", 1810.
- Nicolas-André Monsiau, Saint Vincent de Paul welcoming the exposed children, Paris, church of Saint Germain l'Auxerrois, copy at Toulouse, musée de la Médecine.
- Pierre Révoil,
  - René d’Anjou passing the night at the château of Palamède de Forbin, commissioned by the comte de Forbin, a descendant of René d’Anjou.
  - The Tourney, 1812, Lyon, musée des Beaux-arts;
  - The convalescence of Bayard, 1817, Paris, musée du Louvre;
- Fleury-Richard, Jacques Molay, Grand Master of the Templars, Acquired after the 1806 Salon by the Empress Joséphine. Inherited from Hortense de Beauharnais.
- Louis Rubio, The unlucky Loves of Francesca da Rimini, 1832.
- Marie-Philippe Coupin de la Couperie, The Tragic Love of Francesca da Rimini, 1812.
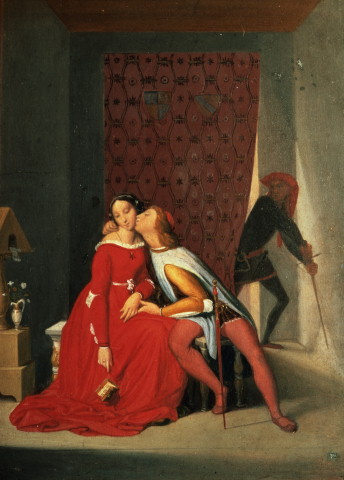
Ingres, Gianciotto Discovers Paolo and Francesca, 1819

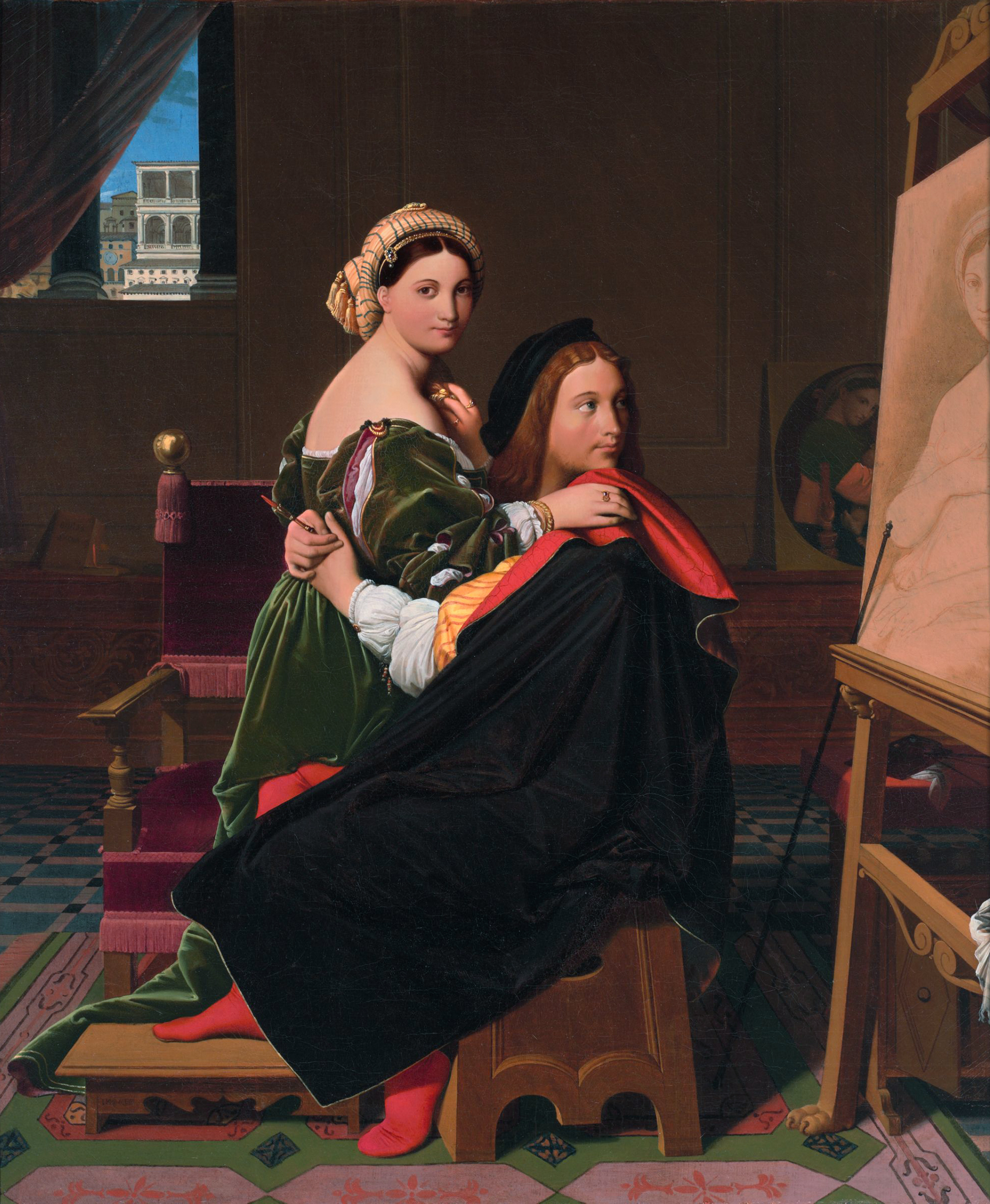
Ingres, Raphael and "La Fornarina" his mistress, 1814

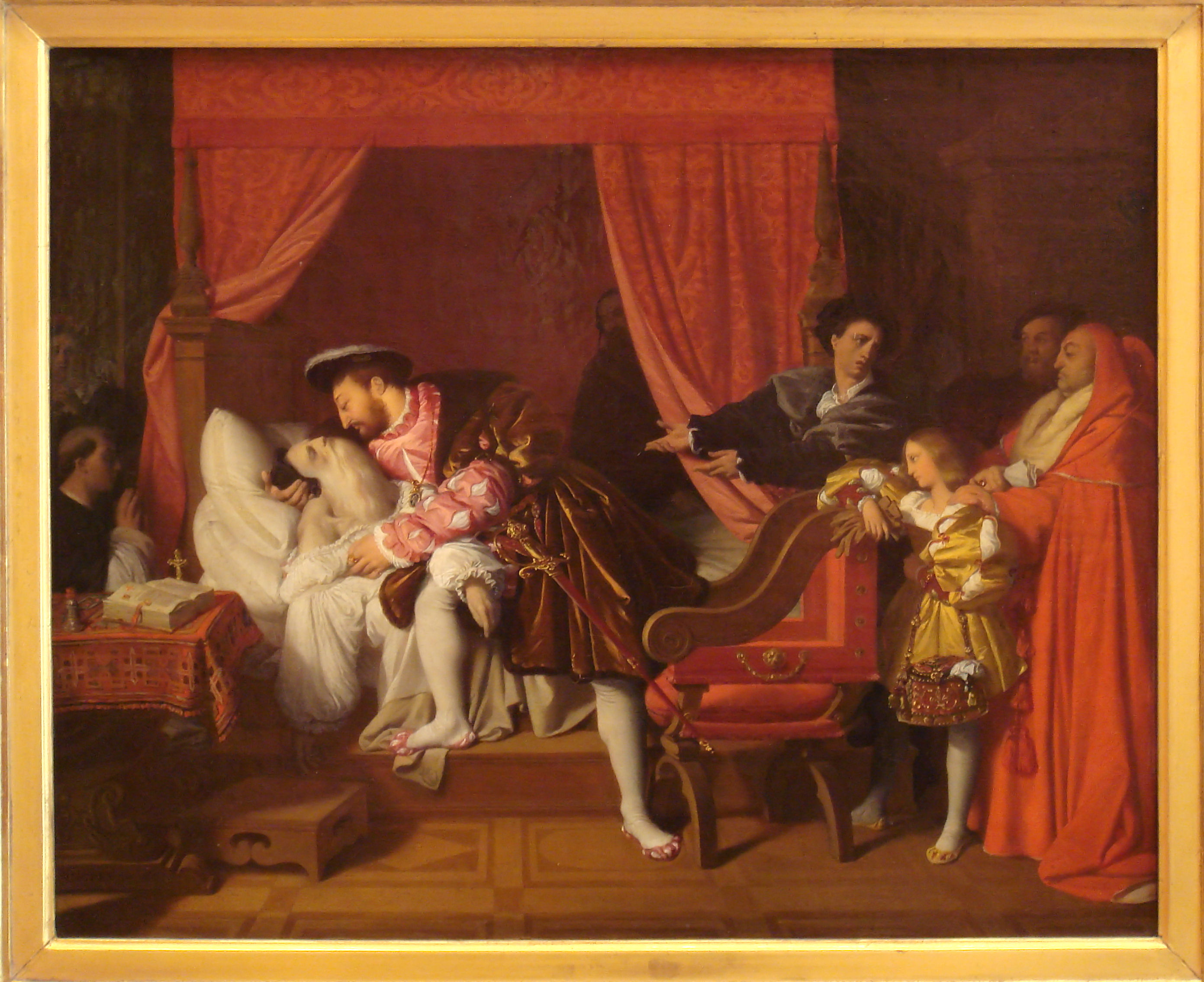
Ingres, Francois I receives the last breaths of Leonardo da Vinci

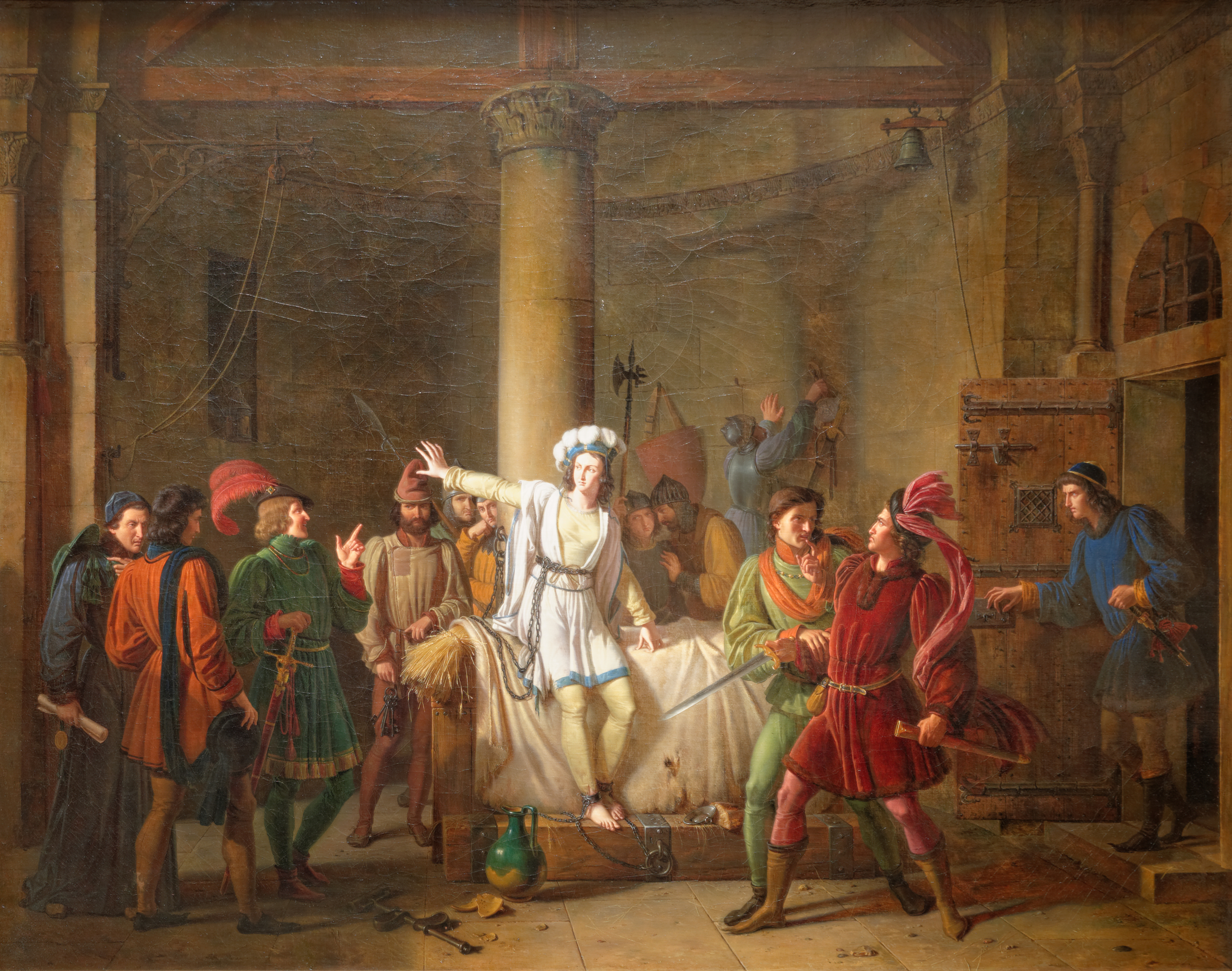
Joan of Arc Imprisoned in Rouen by Pierre Révoil, 1819

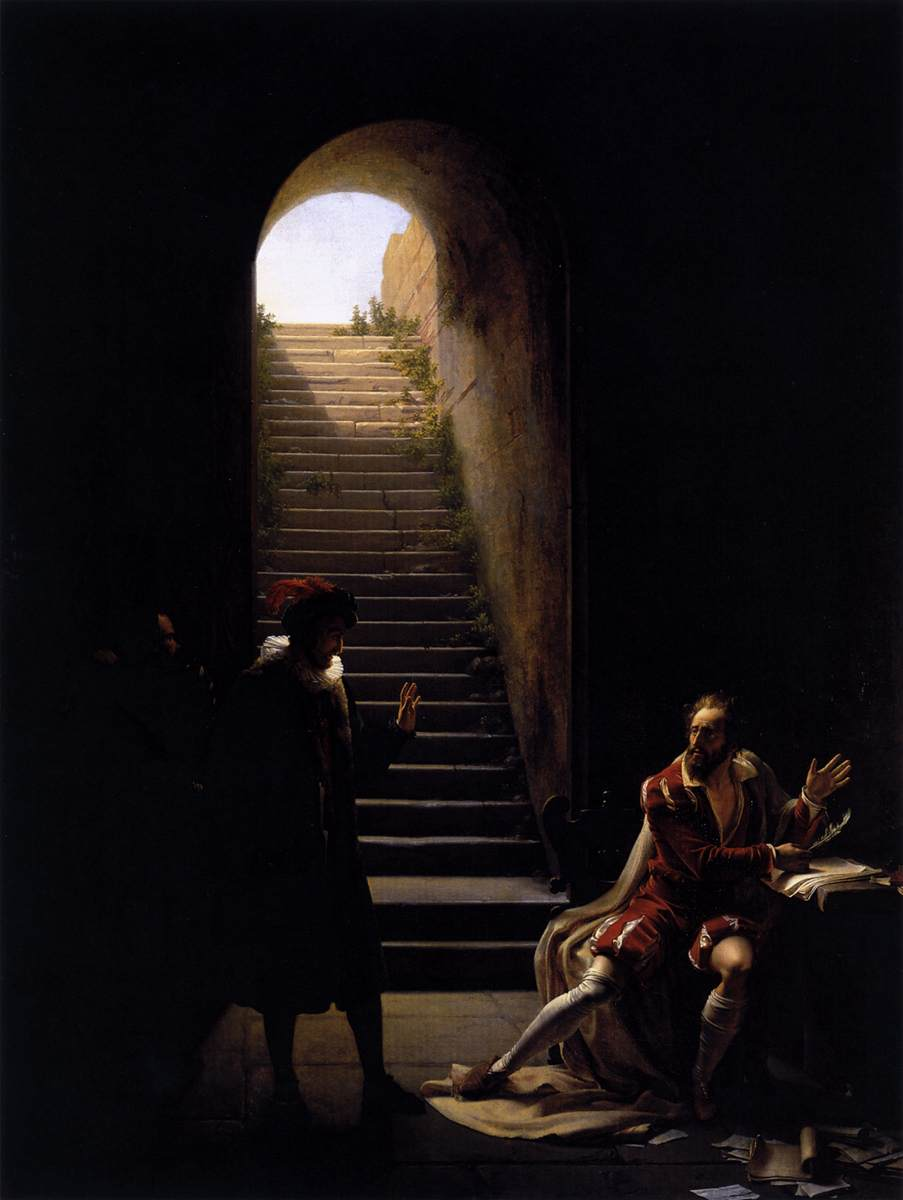
Fleury-François Richard, Montaigne and Tasso, 1822

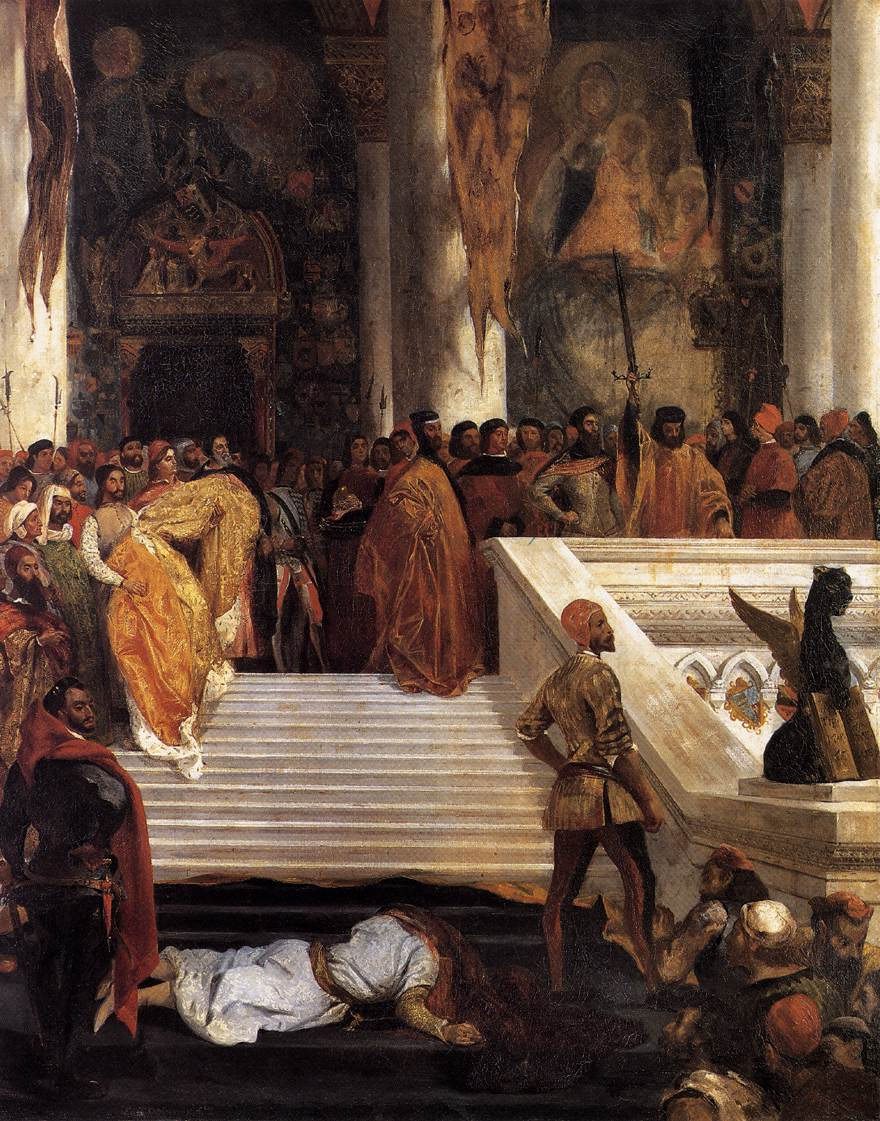
Eugène Delacroix, The Execution of Doge Marino Faliero

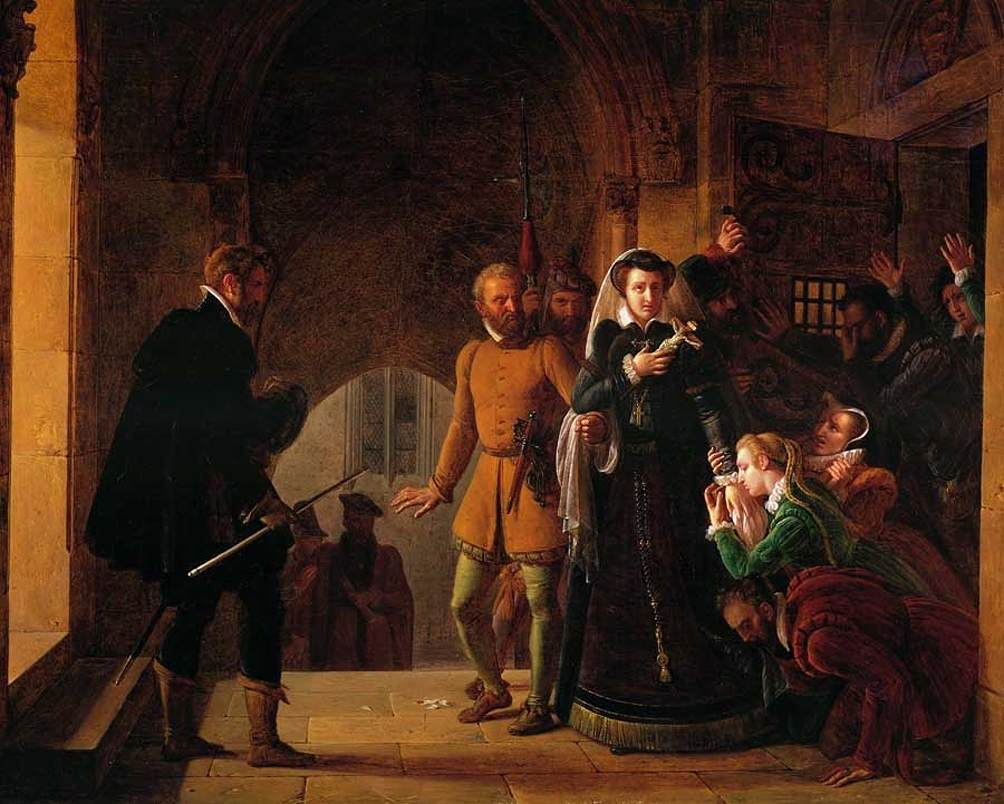
Pierre-Henri Révoil, Mary, Queen of Scots, Separated from Her Followers, 1822

== Reaction ==
Reaction to this genre, as to the Pre-Raphaelites in England, has been mixed. It can be seen as overly sentimental or unrealistically nostalgic, treating its subjects in a way "later associated with Hollywood costume dramas." To its proponents, the archaic details were regarded as a rallying cry for a new, localized nationalism, purged of classical (or neo-classical) and Roman influence. The small size of many of the canvases was considered a reference to Northern, primitive painting, devoid of Italian influence. To others, the small canvas sizes represent the artworks' insignificance and lack of vigor. All the brass, gilding, carving and inlaid historical detail of the headboards of the world could not redeem such objects as anything other than interior decoration.

== Architecture ==
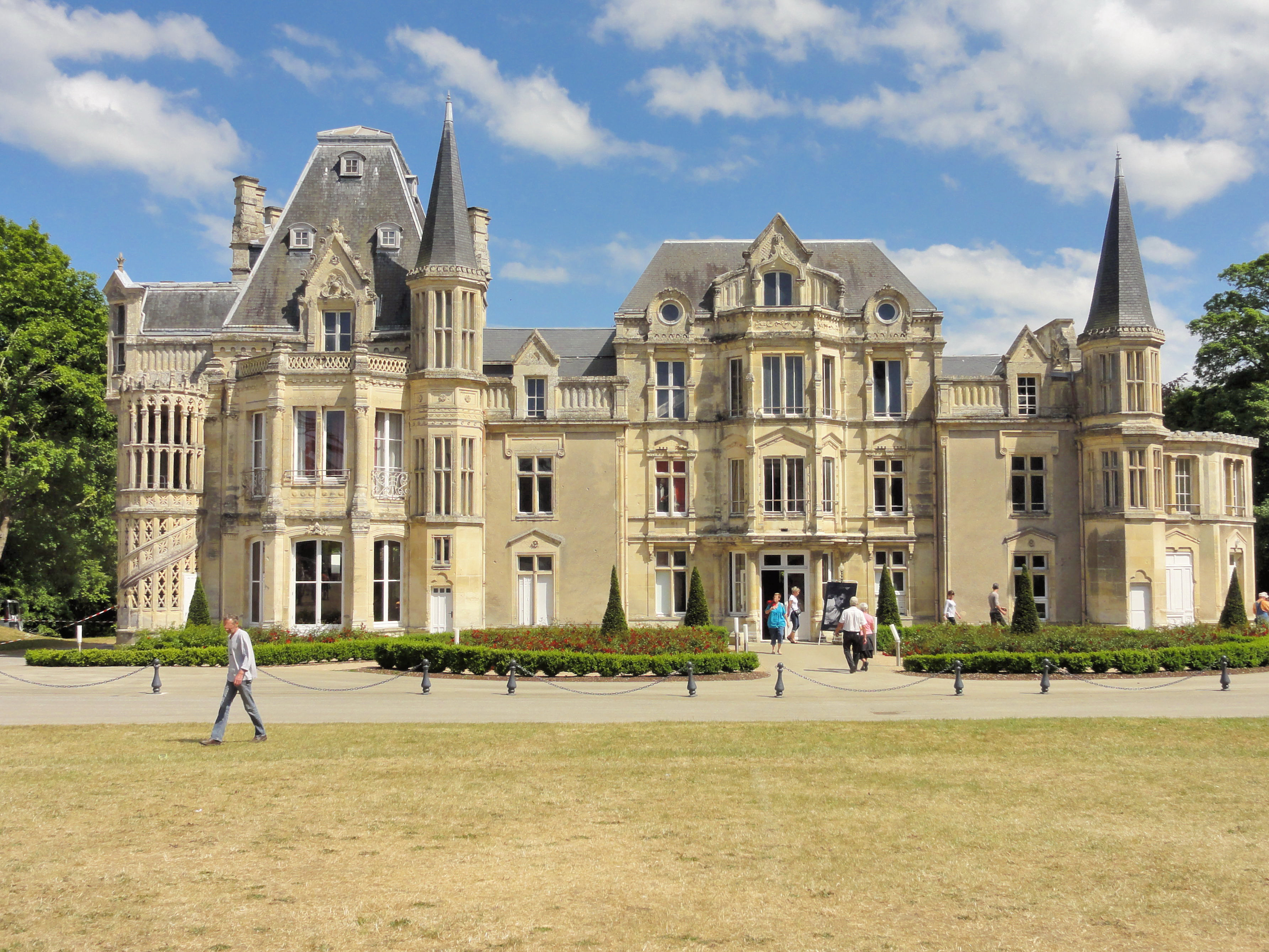
Chateau de Beauregard, Calvados, 1864

A fashion for medieval architecture may be seen throughout 19th century Europe, originating in England, and a blooming of the Neogothic style, but in France this remains limited to certain 'feudal' buildings in the parks surrounding châteaux. After the Troubadour style disappeared in painting, around the time of the 1848 French Revolution, it continued (or re-emerged) in architecture, the decorative arts, literature and theatre.

=== Troubador buildings ===
- Château d'Aulteribe, at Semantizon, rebuilt by Henriette Onslow, daughter of the musician George Onslow.
- Château du Barry, at Lévignac, a Neo-Gothic wing, by the brothers Auguste Virebent and Pascal Virebent (1745–1831), architects in Toulouse.
- Château de Clavières-Ayrens, at Ayrens, built by Ernest de La Salle de Rochemaure
- Château de Maulmont at Saint-Priest-de-Bramefant, architect Pierre-François-Léonard Fontaine, formerly a hunting lodge on the royal domain of Randan which was one of Louis-Philippe of France's residences.
- Château de Pierrefonds, Eugène Viollet-le-Duc architect.
- Château de la Rochepot, reconstruction by Marie Pauline Cécile Dupond-White (1841–1898), widow Sadi-Carnot.
- Gallerie Saint-Louis, Palais de justice de Paris, built in 1835 by Gisors (1796–1866), in place of a gothic gallery he had demolished.
- Château de Vigny

== Decorative arts ==
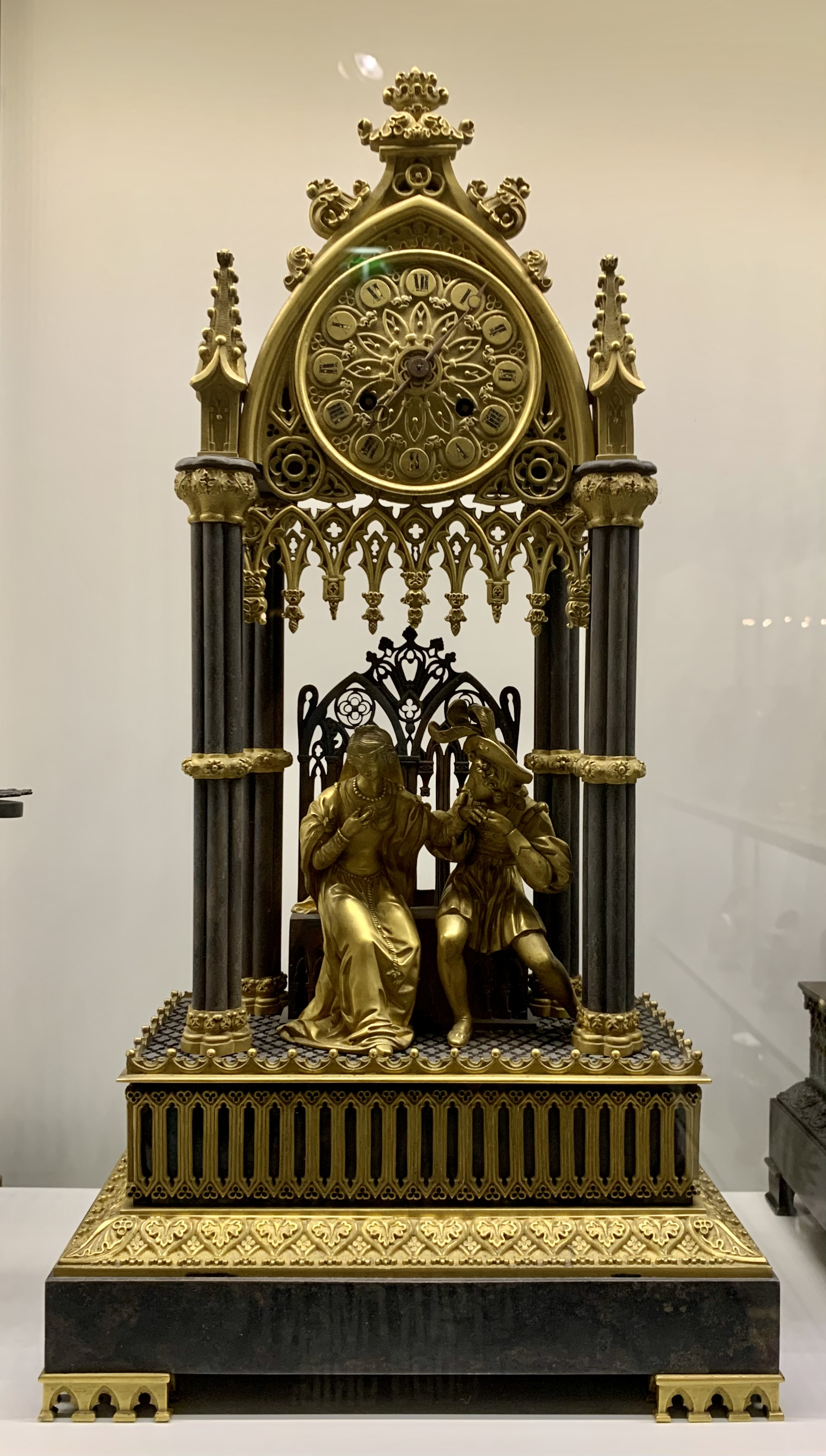
Clock, unknown French maker, c.1835-1840, gilt and patinated bronze, Museum of Decorative Arts, Paris

Besides fine arts and architecture, the style also manifested in furniture, metalworks, ceramics and other decorative arts during the 19th century. In France, it was the first reaction against the hegemony of Neoclassicism. At the end of the Restoration (1814–1830) and during the Louis-Philippe period (1830-1848), Gothic Revival motifs start to appear in France, together with revivals of the Renaissance and of Rococo. During these two periods, the vogue for medieval things led craftsmen to adopt Gothic decorative motifs in their work, such as bell turrets, lancet arches, trefoils, Gothic tracery and rose windows.

=== Troubador objects ===
- Horloge au troubadour, in the Empire-troubadour style, 1810, by Masure à Étampes
- Service à chocolat Du Gesclin, Manufacture de Sèvres, cartoon by Alexandre-Évariste Fragonard (1780–1850)

== Bibliography ==
- Aux sources de l'ethnologie française, l'Académie celtique, 1995, Nicole Belmont. This work traces the birth of the fashion for premodern architecture and literature, from the middle of the 18th century of the fad for the monuments of the architecture and literature (Middle Ages, High Middle Ages and Early Middle Ages) and the beginnings of new inventorising and research work on the topic among the Benedictines of Saint-Maur.

=== Painting ===
- Exhibition catalogue, Le Style Troubadour, Bourg-en-Bresse, musée de Brou 1971.
- Marie-Claude Chaudonneret, La Peinture Troubadour, deux artistes lyonnais, Pierre Révoil (1776–1842), Fleury Richard (1777–1852), Arthéna, Paris, 1980.
- Marie-Claude Chaudonneret, "Tableaux Troubadour", Revue du Louvre, n° 5/6, 1983, pages 411–413.
- François Pupil, Le Style Troubadour ou la nostalgie du bon vieux temps, Nancy, Presses. Universitaires de Nancy, 1985.
- Guy Stair Sainty (editor), Romance and Chivalry: History and Literature Reflected in Early Nineteenth-Century French Painting, Stair Sainty Mathiesen Gallery, New York, 1996.
- Maïté Bouyssy (editor), "Puissances du gothique", Sociétés & Représentations, n° 20, décembre 2005, edited by Bertrand Tillier.

=== Literature ===
- Comte de Tressan, Oeuvres choisies de Tressan, corps d'extraits de romans de chevalerie, 1782–1791, 12 volumes, chez Garnier, à Paris, hôtel Serpente, comprising Amadis de Gaule, Rolland Furieux, Flore et Blanchefleur, Histoire du petit Jehan de Saintré, Cléomade et Claremonde, Le Roman de la Rose, Arthus de Bretagne, Fleurs de batailles, Dom Ursino de Navarin et Dona Inès d'Ovidéo, Gérard de Nevers, etc.. Its accompanying illustrative engravings, showing decorated and figured troubador scenes, were a great success.
- Horace Walpole, The Castle of Otranto

=== Architecture ===
- Guy Massin-Le Goff, Châteaux néo-gothiques en Anjou, Éditions Nicolas Chaudun, Paris, 2007.

=== Fashion ===
- Mackrell, Alice (January 1998). "Dress in Le Style Troubadour". Costume. 32 (1): 33–44. doi:10.1179/cos.1998.32.1.33.
