= Louis Vigée =

French painter

- Born: 2 February 1715
- Died: 9 May 1767 (52 years)
- Children: Élisabeth Vigée Le Brun; Étienne Vigée
- Relatives: Julie Le Brun (granddaughter)

Louis Vigée (2 February 1715 – 9 May 1767) was a French portraitist. He was also a fan painter, artist in pastels and a member of the Académie de Saint-Luc.

In 1750, he married Jeanne Maissin Vigée (1728–1800). In 1755, Jeanne gave birth to their first child Élisabeth Louise Vigée (1755–1842), who became a painter and portraitist, and in 1758, Jeanne gave birth to their second child Étienne Vigée (1758–1820), whom became a playwright and man of letters.

Vigée died in May 1767.

== Gallery ==
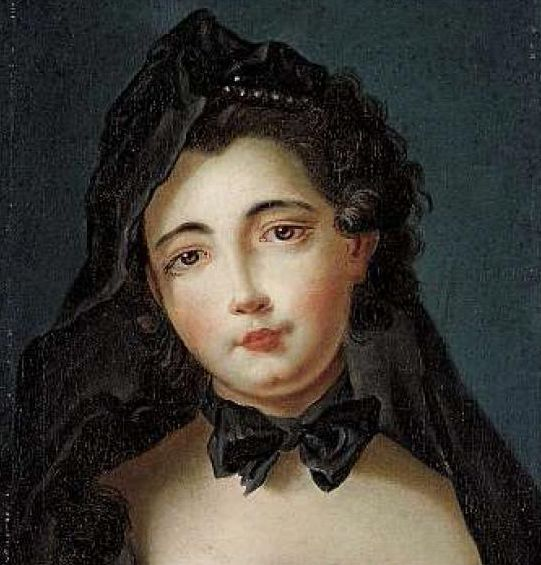
Louis Vigée, Portrait of a young widowed woman

Marie-Justine-Benoîte Cabaret du Ronceray, Madame Favart, as pilgrim, presumed portrait, Nationalmuseum, Stockholm
