= Héroïde =

Type of verse letter in French literature

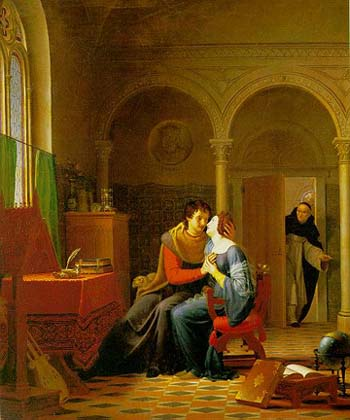
The letters of Heloise and Abelard has provided the subject matter for several héroïdes.

An héroïde (French pronunciation: [eʁɔid]) is a term in French literature for a letter in verse, written under the name of a hero or famous author, derived from the Heroides by Ovid. It was invented by Charles-Pierre Colardeau. The héroïde is a form of tragedy under the form of epistle as it is not mandatory that the héroïde be written under the name of a famous character, and it is not enough either that the epistle is either to be defined under the term. What the héroïde consists of is more that the nature of the subject needs to be serious, sad and belong to epic poetry and the elegy. The dramatic action is psychological, the story replaces the dialogue and the reader's imagination must be taken sufficiently to make it able to reconstitute the evolution of the drama to which it is only given the view of one of the characters.

According to Marmontel: "The poet is both the decorator and engineer, not only must he trace back in his verses the location of the stage, but also reconstitute the action, the movement, in one word everything that would be missed if the poem was dramatic." Making one of the characters of the drama speak, the author must choose the most important of them, and make it express all the feelings related to it, summarize in the character all the importance and consequences of the action.

The number of héroïdes in French literature is limited. The letters of Heloise and Abelard supplied Beauchamps, Colardeau and Dorat material for several héroïdes. Gabrielle d’Estrées à Henri IV composed in 1767 by Antoine-Alexandre-Henri Poinsinet, Barthe produced one in his 'Lettre de l’abbé de Rancé'. The epistle of Dido to Aeneas by Gilbert can also be referred to.

The héroïde is a style long abandoned. Modern writers, freeing themselves from the constraints enforced on poetry by earlier poetics, also abandoned old didactic modes, such as the elegy, the ode, the dithyramb the stanza and the héroïde, letting them fuse in either the meditation or the complaint, only forms under which the poet seems to want to express his thoughts.

== Sources ==
- Artaud de Montor, Encyclopédie des gens du monde, v. 13, Paris, Treuttel et Würtz Treuttel et Würtz, 1840, p. 762-3.
