= List of awards and nominations received by Chris Cornell =

Chris Cornell awards and nominations
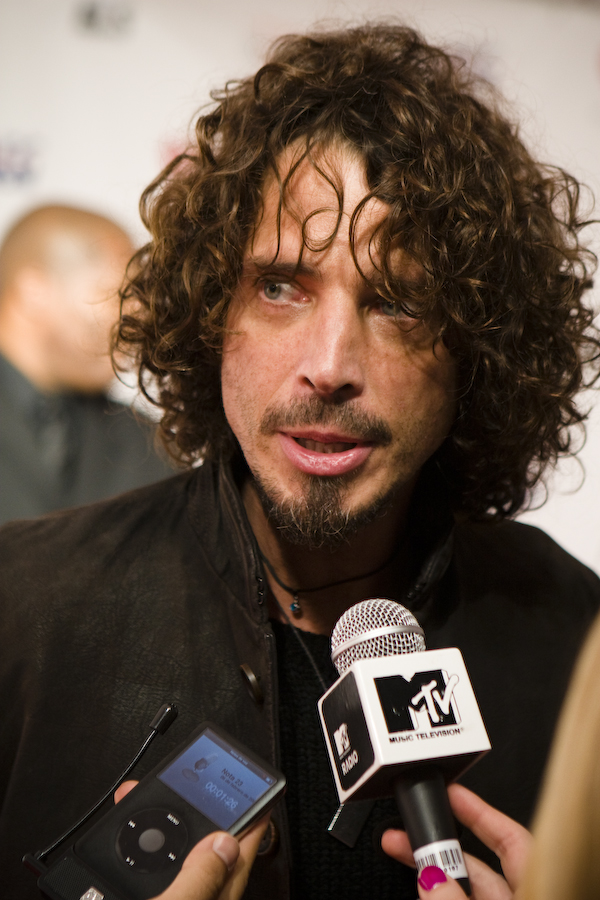
- Cornell in 2009
Awards and nominations
Award	Wins	Nominations
Grammy	3	18
Golden Globe Awards	0	1

Totals (Note: Certain award groups do not simply award one winner. They acknowledge several different recipients, have runners-up, and have third place. Since this is a specific recognition and is different from losing an award, runner-up mentions are considered wins in this award tally. For simplification and to avoid errors, each award in this list has been presumed to have had a prior nomination.)
- Wins: 15
- Nominations: 100

The following is a list of awards and nominations received by American rock musician Chris Cornell.

== Clio Awards ==
Year	Nominee / work	Award	Result	Ref.
1995	Black Hole Sun (with Soundgarden)	Alternative Music Video	Won	

== GAFFA Awards ==
The GAFFA Awards is an annual awards ceremony established in 1991 by the Danish magazine of the same name.

Year	Nominee / work	Award	Result	Ref.
1999	Chris Cornell	Foreign New Act	Nominated	
2006	Chris Cornell	Foreign Singer of the Year	Nominated	

== Grammy Awards ==
The Grammy Awards are awarded annually by the National Academy of Recording Arts and Sciences.

Year	Nominee / work	Award	Result	Ref.
1990	Ultramega OK (with Soundgarden)	Best Metal Performance	Nominated	
1992	Badmotorfinger (with Soundgarden)	Best Metal Performance	Nominated	
1993	"Into the Void (Sealth)" (with Soundgarden)	Best Metal Performance	Nominated	
1995	"Spoonman" (with Soundgarden)	Best Metal Performance	Won	
1995	"Black Hole Sun" (with Soundgarden)	Best Hard Rock Performance	Won	
1995	"Black Hole Sun" (with Soundgarden)	Best Rock Song	Nominated	
1995	Superunknown (with Soundgarden)	Best Rock Album	Nominated	
1997	"Pretty Noose" (with Soundgarden)	Best Hard Rock Performance	Nominated	
2000	"Can't Change Me"	Best Male Rock Vocal Performance	Nominated	
2004	"Like a Stone" (with Audioslave)	Best Hard Rock Performance	Nominated	
2004	Audioslave (with Audioslave)	Best Rock Album	Nominated	
2006	"Doesn't Remind Me" (with Audioslave)	Best Hard Rock Performance	Nominated	
2008	"You Know My Name" from Casino Royale	Best Song Written for a Motion Picture, Television or Other Visual Media	Nominated	
2011	"Black Rain" (with Soundgarden)	Best Hard Rock Performance	Nominated	
2018	"The Promise" from The Promise	Best Rock Performance	Nominated	
2019	"When Bad Does Good"	Best Rock Performance	Won	
2022	"No One Sings Like You Anymore, Vol. 1"	Best Rock Album	Nominated	
2022	"Nothing Compares 2 U"	Best Rock Performance	Nominated	

== Golden Globe Awards ==
Year	Nominee / work	Award	Result	Ref.
2012	"The Keeper" from Machine Gun Preacher	Best Original Song	Nominated	

== Hollywood Music in Media Award ==
Year	Nominee / work	Award	Result	Ref.
2017	"The Promise" from The Promise	Original Song - Feature Film	Nominated	

== MTV Video Music Awards ==
The MTV Video Music Awards is an annual awards ceremony established in 1984 by MTV.

Year	Nominee / work	Award	Result	Ref.
1994	"Black Hole Sun" (with Soundgarden)	MTV Video Music Award for Best Rock Video	Won	

== MTV Europe Music Awards ==
Year	Nominee / work	Award	Result	Ref.
1994	Soundgarden	Best Rock	Nominated	

== MusiCares MAP Fund ==
The Stevie Ray Vaughan Award is given annually by the MusiCares MAP Fund honoring musicians for their devotion to helping other addicts struggling with the recovery process.

Year	Nominee / work	Award	Result	Ref.
2007	Chris Cornell	Stevie Ray Vaughan Award	Won	

== Northwest Area Music Awards ==
The Northwest Area Music Awards (NAMA) was an awards ceremony held by the Northwest Area Music Association.

Year	Nominee / work	Award	Result	Ref.
1991	Chris Cornell	Best Male Vocalist	Won	
1991	Soundgarden	Best Rock Group	Won	
1992	Chris Cornell	Best Male Vocalist	Won	
1992	Badmotorfinger	Best Metal Album	Won	
1992	Soundgarden	Best Metal Group	Won	

== Revolver Golden Gods Awards ==
The Revolver Golden Gods Awards is an annual awards ceremony held by Revolver, an American hard-rock and heavy metal magazine.

Year	Nominee / work	Award	Result	Ref.
2013	King Animal (with Soundgarden)	Album of the Year	Nominated	
2013	Soundgarden	Comeback of the Year	Nominated	
2013	Chris Cornell	Best Vocalist	Nominated	

== Satellite Awards ==
Year	Nominee / work	Award	Result	Ref.
2006	"You Know My Name" from Casino Royale	Best Original Song	Won	
2018	"The Promise" from The Promise	Best Original Song	Nominated	

== World Soundtrack Awards ==
Year	Nominee / work	Award	Result	Ref.
2007	"You Know My Name" from Casino Royale	Best Original Song Written Directly for a Film	Won	
