= Flushed Away (soundtrack) =

2006 film soundtrack album

Flushed Away (Music from the Motion Picture)

Soundtrack album by various artists
- Released: 31 October 2006
- Genre: Film soundtrack
- Length: 36:16
- Labels: EMI; Astralwerks
- Producers: Errol Kolosine; Lisa Wohl

Flushed Away (Music from the Motion Picture) is the soundtrack album to the 2006 DreamWorks Animation and Aardman Animations film Flushed Away directed by David Bowers and Sam Fell. The soundtrack was released under the EMI and Astralwerks record labels on the occasion of Halloween (31 October) 2006 and featured 15 songs including dialogues and musical performances from the cast that performed successful covers and original score composed by Harry Gregson-Williams.

== Track listing ==
No.	Title	Artist	Length
1.	"Be Seeing You My Friend"		0:04
2.	"Dancing with Myself"	Billy Idol	4:49
3.	"Are You Gonna Be My Girl"	Jet	3:34
4.	"She's a Lady"	Tom Jones	2:54
5.	"Ice Cold Rita"	Hugh Jackman & The Slugs	0:44
6.	"Bohemian Like You"	The Dandy Warhols	3:32
7.	"Marcel / That's Not Rice You're Eating"	Harry Gregson-Williams & The Slugs	0:55
8.	"What's New Pussycat?"	Tom Jones	2:17
9.	"Yakety Sax"	Boots Randolph	2:01
10.	"Mr. Lonely"	The Slugs	0:27
11.	"Don't Worry, Be Happy (with The Slugs intro)"	Bobby McFerrin	4:22
12.	"Proud Mary"	Tina Turner	5:25
13.	"Wonderful Night"	Fatboy Slim	2:37
14.	"Life in the Sewer"	Harry Gregson-Williams	4:40
15.	"Beware...Beware"	The Slugs	0:35
Total length:			36:16

== Reception ==
Heather Phares of AllMusic called it an "enjoyable, but not particularly ambitious, collection". Ben Simon of Animated Views wrote "Harry Gregson-Williams brings a bright and involving score to proceedings, which sometimes sounds reminiscent of other works (the main theme plays very close to one from John Williams’ music for Hook), but carries the action along with panache and certainly adds a layer of epic-ness. Flushed Away is also one of the few animated films of recent times to use source tracks and re-recorded cover versions extremely well within its soundtrack and not just as an excuse for filling a noise crack to suggest an action sequence more frantic than it actually is." Timothy Wheeler of Catholic Exchange wrote that "the soundtrack crams in a few too many pop hits". Nyk Zietari of Eye for Film said that the film "benefits from an excellent soul/rock soundtrack, blessedly Disney free".

== Personnel ==
Credits adapted from liner notes:

- Soundtrack producer – Errol Kolosine, Lisa Wohl
- Executive soundtrack producer – Sunny Park
- Music coordinator – Charlene Huang, Julie Imboden Keel, Ken "Kaz" Smith, Robert Vasquez, Vince Villanueva
- Mastering and compilation – Dave Donnelly
- Project manager – Ashley Warren
- Art direction and design – Unknown Graphic Services
- Music clearance – Julie Butchko, Kevin Carson, Tonya Puerto
- Music business affairs – David Tockman, Lenny Wohl, Lori Blackstone
- Executive in charge of music – Cynthia Sexton

== Chart performance ==
Chart (2009)	Peak position
UK Soundtrack Albums (OCC)	44
US Top Soundtracks (Billboard)	23

== Awards ==
Award	Date of ceremony	Category	Recipient(s)	Result	Ref.
Online Film & Television Awards	January 2007	Best Adapted Song	"Mr. Lonely" – the Slugs	Nominated	
World Soundtrack Awards	October 20, 2007	Film Composer of the Year	Harry Gregson-Williams (Note: also for Déjà Vu (2006), Shrek the Third and The Number 23 (both 2007))	Nominated	
World Soundtrack Awards	October 20, 2007	Best Original Film Score of the Year	Harry Gregson-Williams	Nominated	
