= Toni Cornell =

American singer, songwriter, and philanthropist (born 2004)

- Born: September 18, 2004 (age 22); Los Angeles, California, U.S.
- Occupations: Singer, songwriter
- Father: Chris Cornell
- Relatives: Peter Cornell (uncle)

Toni Cornell (born September 18, 2004) is an American singer, songwriter, and philanthropist. She first gained public attention in 2015 with a duet performance of Bob Marley's "Redemption Song" with her father, Chris Cornell, the lead vocalist of Temple of the Dog, Soundgarden, and Audioslave, at The Beacon Theatre. In 2019, she released her debut single, “Far Away Places”, which she wrote at age 12 and was produced by her father. In addition to her musical work, Cornell is involved in numerous philanthropic endeavors. She co-founded the "STOP THE STIGMA" initiative in partnership with the Addiction Policy Forum and the Chris and Vicky Cornell Foundation, which focuses on reducing the stigma associated with addiction and mental health.

Following her father's death in 2017, Cornell performed Leonard Cohen's "Hallelujah" with OneRepublic on Good Morning America, a tribute that received widespread media coverage. Cornell has since appeared on major platforms such as The Tonight Show Starring Jimmy Fallon and The Late Late Show with James Corden, where she performed tributes to her father and demonstrated her own musical style. Her rendition of Prince's "Nothing Compares 2 U" has been streamed widely and raised funds for various charities, including the International Rescue Committee. In 2022, she became the youngest ambassador for the International Rescue Committee, where she advocates for refugee support and international aid efforts.

== Early life and education ==
Toni Cornell was born on September 18, 2004, in Los Angeles, California. She is the daughter of the late musician Chris Cornell and Vicky Cornell. Her uncle is singer Peter Cornell.

== Influences ==
Cornell draws inspiration from her own experiences and emotions, channeling both moments of distress and happiness into her songwriting. Her music is deeply influenced by a diverse range of iconic artists, including Stevie Nicks, Joni Mitchell, Freddie Mercury, Jim Morrison, David Bowie, The Beach Boys, Johnny Cash, Joan Baez, and Pink Floyd. Known for her passion for storytelling, Cornell strives to craft lyrics that are not only emotive but also thought-provoking, with the goal of capturing listeners' attention and making them pause to reflect.

== Career ==
Cornell's career in music began with a duet of Bob Marley's “Redemption Song” with her father in 2015, performed live at The Beacon Theatre in New York. Following this debut, she continued to appear in tribute performances and has gradually developed her own music career. In 2019, she released her first original song, Far Away Places, which her father helped produce. Cornell's performances, especially those honoring her father's legacy, have garnered widespread media attention.

=== Original music releases ===
Far Away Places, released in 2019, marked Cornell's first venture into original music. Written at age 12, the song showcases her lyrical and vocal talent, with production support from Chris Cornell. It was featured in a short film of the same name and earned awards in the short film festival circuit. Since then, Cornell has performed several other songs, including renditions of "Nothing Compares 2 U", which raised funds for charitable organizations.

=== Television appearances ===
Cornell made her television debut in 2017 on Good Morning America, performing a tribute to her father alongside OneRepublic. She has also appeared on The Tonight Show Starring Jimmy Fallon and The Late Late Show with James Corden, where her performances of "Nothing Compares 2 U" honored her father's memory. Each of these appearances has been praised for their emotional resonance and vocal depth.

== Philanthropy and advocacy ==
=== Charity work and social initiatives ===
Proceeds from Cornell's performances and releases, including her cover of "Nothing Compares 2 U", have been donated to organizations like the International Rescue Committee (IRC) and the New York Society for the Prevention of Cruelty to Children (NYSPCC). She has also volunteered with foster care programs and disaster relief efforts, preparing meals and assembling emergency care packages for hurricane victims.

=== Stop the stigma initiative ===
In 2020, Cornell and her brother Christopher launched the STOP THE STIGMA initiative to address addiction education and reduce the stigma around substance use disorders. In partnership with the Addiction Policy Forum and the Chris and Vicky Cornell Foundation, the program is designed for high schools across the U.S. and aims to educate students on the science of addiction as a health issue, promoting a peer-to-peer support model. They also launched a podcast to explore these topics with experts, including Dr. Nora Volkow of the National Institute on Drug Abuse.

=== Ambassadorship ===
In 2022, Cornell became the youngest ambassador for the International Rescue Committee (IRC), where she advocates for refugee support and international aid. Her role has involved both fundraising and awareness campaigns, utilizing her public platform to speak on global issues affecting displaced populations and marginalized communities.

== Discography ==
Year	Artist	Album	Song	Co-written with
2024	Toni Cornell	Non-album single	"Sunset of Your Love"	Dave Hamelin, Mozella, Toni Cornell
2019	Toni Cornell	Non-album single	"Far Away Places"	Chris Cornell
2018	Toni Cornell, Chris Cornell	Cover	"Nothing Compares 2 U" – Cover with Chris Cornell (Father's Day Tribute)	

== Awards and nominations ==
- Global Music Award for "Far Away Places" (Lyrics and Songwriter)
- Diamond Award for "Far Away Places" (LA Shorts International Film Festival)
- Oniros Film Award as Honorable Mention for "Far Away Places"
