= Statue of Chris Cornell =

Statue by Nick Marra in Seattle, Washington, U.S.

- The statue in 2021
- Interactive map of Statue of Chris Cornell
- Location: Museum of Pop Culture, Seattle, Washington, U.S.
- Coordinates: 47.62120°N 122.34784°W
- Type: Statue
- Material: Bronze
- Dedicated date: 2018
- Dedicated to: Chris Cornell

A bronze sculpture depicting late Soundgarden vocalist Chris Cornell (called Chris Cornell in Performance) is installed outside Seattle's Museum of Pop Culture (MoPop), in the U.S. state of Washington. The statue was created by sculptor and special effects artist Nick Marra.

Chris's widow Vicky Cornell announced in August 2017 that Wayne Toth had been commissioned to create the sculpture. The sculpture created by Nick Marra was first displayed to the public on October 7, 2018, in a ceremony attended by his widow, three children, and remaining members of Soundgarden. The life-size statue shows the musician holding a guitar. Vicky Cornell donated the statue to the MoPop museum.

The statue was vandalized in August 2020.

== See also ==
- 2018 in art
