= Ray's Boathouse =

Restaurant in Seattle, Washington, U.S.

Coordinates: 47.6734°N 122.4076°W

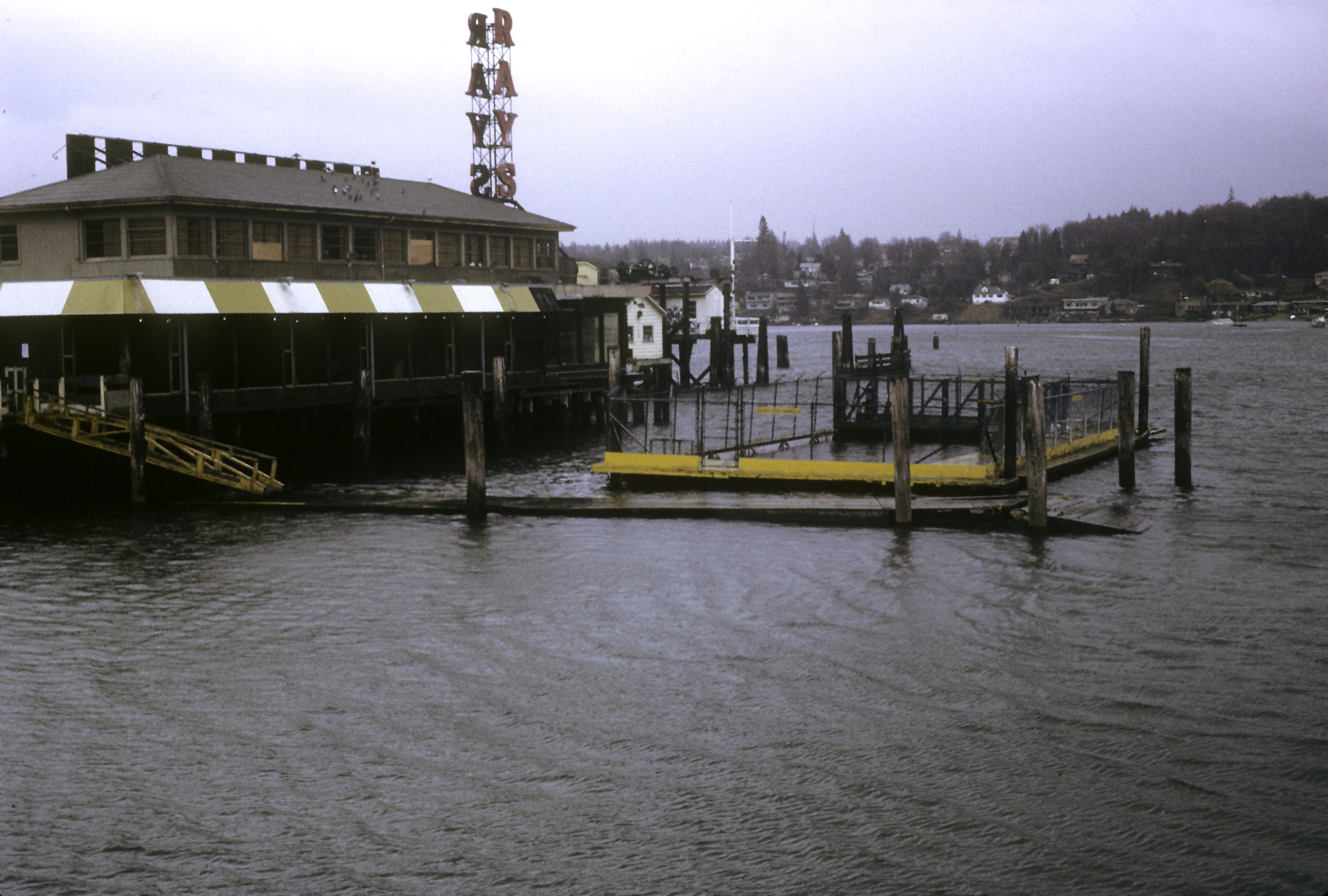
- Ray's Boathouse in the 1970s
- Interactive map of Ray's Boathouse

Restaurant information
- Food type: Seafood
- Location: Seattle, Washington, U.S.
- Website: www.rays.com

Ray's Boathouse is a restaurant in the Ballard neighborhood of Seattle, Washington, United States, located on Shilshole Bay along the Puget Sound shoreline. It is noted for its seafood and views of Puget Sound and the Olympic Mountains, and has been listed as one of the city's top restaurants alongside The Herbfarm.

== History ==
In 1939, founder Ray Lichtenberger, moved his growing boat rental and bait house to the current location and opened a coffeehouse in 1945. By 1952, he’d built the neon sign that flashes “RAY’S” in bold, red letters on the dock.

In 1973, Russ Wohlers led a group of local entrepreneurs in transforming the place into a full-service fresh seafood restaurant. The restaurant originally opened in June 1973. In 1983, Ray's was one of four restaurants that began serving fresh Copper River salmon for the first time, and is credited with bringing awareness of local food to Seattle's fish consumers. That year the restaurant also introduced commercially harvested Olympia oysters to its menu, heralding a "comeback" for the species which had had a total harvest measured in hundreds of gallons a few years earlier.

In 2002, Ray's was awarded in the America's Classics category of the James Beard Foundation Awards. In 2004, its then-executive chef Charles Ramseyer was recognized as one of the nation's most innovative fish chefs by Wine Spectator. The establishment was refurbished in 2013.

== In popular culture ==
It appeared in 1,000 Places to See in the USA and Canada Before You Die, and has featured on lists of tourist destinations by Moon Guides (Williams), Fodor's and Frommer's, among others.

At one time the restaurant employed Chris Cornell as a chef, prior to him co-founding the rock band Soundgarden. Cornell attended the retirement party at Ray's of longtime chef Wayne Ludvigsen in 1997.

== Bibliography ==
- Amrine, Eric (2011). Top 10 Seattle. Eyewitness Top 10 Travel Guides. DK Publishing. ISBN 978-0-7566-8729-8.
- Fodor's Seattle. Fodor's Gold Guides. Fodor's Travel Publications. 2004. p. 25. ISBN 978-1-4000-1330-2.
- Johnson, C.; Johnson, B.; Van Gytenbeek, K. (2005). Savor Greater Seattle Cookbook: Seattle's Finest Restaurants, Their Recipes and Their Histories. Chuck and Blanche Johnson's savor cookbook. Wilderness Adventures Press. ISBN 978-1-932098-08-2.
- Samson, K.; Aukshunas, J. (2001). Frommer's Seattle and Portland 2001. Frommers Seattle & Portland, 2001. John Wiley & Sons Inc. p. 73. ISBN 978-0-7645-6191-7.
- Schultz, Patricia (2011). 1,000 Places to See in the United States and Canada Before You Die. A 1,000 ... before you die book. Workman Pub. ISBN 978-0-7611-6336-7.
- Smith, Giselle (1999). Best Places Seattle. Sasquatch Books. ISBN 978-1-57061-155-1.
- Williams, Allison (2017). Moon Seattle. Moon Handbooks. Avalon Publishing. ISBN 978-1-63121-328-1.
