= Peter Cornell (singer) =

American musician (born 1961)

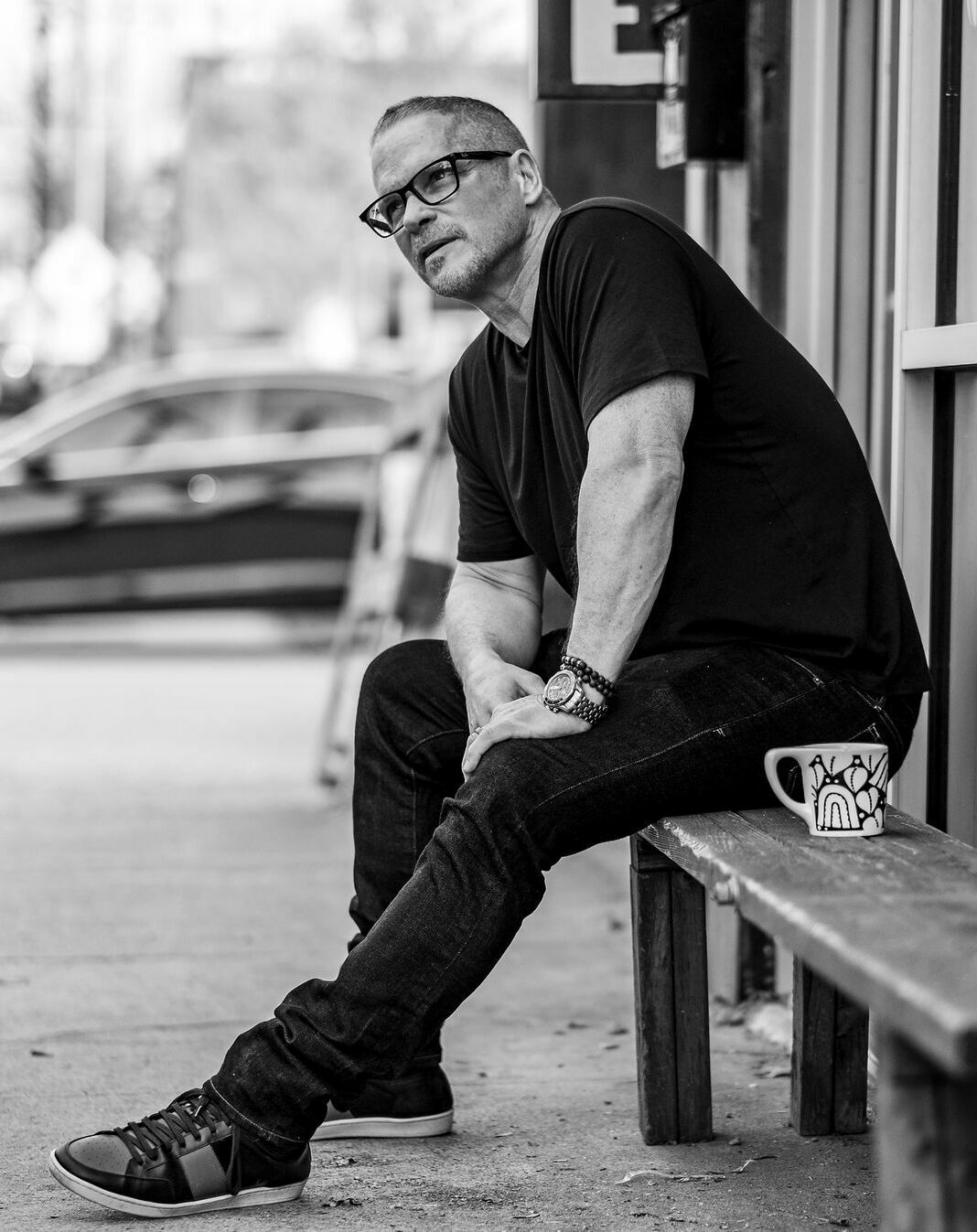
- Cornell in 2021.
- Born: Peter Boyle; April 19, 1961 (age 65); Seattle, Washington, U.S.
- Occupations: Singer; songwriter; musician
- Years active: 1993–present
- Relatives: Chris Cornell (brother); Toni Cornell (niece)
- Musical career
- Genres: Alternative metal; heavy metal; grunge; alternative rock; hard rock
- Instruments: Vocals, guitar
- Formerly of: Inflatable Soule, Somnambulist, Black Market Radio

Peter Cornell (né Boyle; born April 19, 1961) is an American singer, songwriter, and musician.

== Biography ==
Cornell was born Peter Boyle on April 19, 1961, in Seattle, Washington, where he was raised. His parents are Edward F. Boyle, a pharmacist of Irish Catholic descent, and Karen Cornell, an accountant of Jewish background and self-proclaimed psychic.

Cornell was one of six children; he had two brothers and three younger sisters. He was musician Chris Cornell's older brother. After his parents' divorce when he was a teenager, he and his siblings adopted their mother's maiden name, Cornell, as their surname. With his brother Chris, he listened to The Beatles, The Who, The Guess Who, Led Zeppelin and Pink Floyd. "We both listened to the Beatles and Zepp. I think he liked Rush more and I was a Bowie fan." At the age of 20 he learned to play guitar. "I had desire to learn how to write a song [...]. I learned every Beatles song I could."

In the nineties, he sang with his sisters Suzy (percussion/vocals) and Katy (flute/vocals) Cornell in a band called Inflatable Soule; the band was managed by Chris' wife Susan Silver (Soundgarden, Alice in Chains). In 2001 he moved to New York City. With bassist Keith Mannino, he created hard rock band Black Market Radio. "When I wrote BMR I listened to only three things; The Complete Zepp catalogue, the first Cars record, and Alice Cooper's greatest hits."

In 2014, he released his first solo album Champion, featuring Pearl Jam's drummer Dave Abbruzzese on drums. For this bluesy rock album he "listened to a ton of Curtis Mayfield (didn't influence the sound of my record) Chris Cornell's solo records, Alain Johannes, STP, and all things Zepp [...]. I built my own studio and wrote and played everything myself (except for drums which came later)." Two songs appeared in The Vampire Diaries: "Madman" (episode 19, season 6) and "Wash" (episode 4, season 8).

After the death of his brother Chris in 2017, Peter Cornell started a campaign to raise awareness on depression and suicide prevention.

In 2021, he co-wrote, with Kevin Martin, the single "Let Me Down Easy" and produced the acoustic version of the song "Riptide" for Candlebox's new album "Wolves". He became an entrepreneur and opened the Cornell Brothers Coffee Espresso Bar in Nolensville, Tennessee, in memory of his late grandfather and three uncles.

== Personal life ==
Cornell was married to veteran music industry executive and former Soundgarden manager Amy Decker.

== Discography ==
=== Inflatable Soule ===
- 1993: Inflatable Soule
- 1994: So Sad
- 1996: Golden Boy

=== Somnambulist ===
- 2001: The Paranormal Humidor

=== Black Market Radio ===
- 2006: Suicide Parlour
- 2007: Better than a Killer

=== Solo ===
- 1998: Grace, EP
- 2014: Champion

=== Collaboration ===
- 2021: Let Me Down Easy for Candlebox
