= World Soundtrack Awards 2007 =

Belgian music awards ceremony

7th World Soundtrack Awards

October 20, 2007

Best Original Soundtrack:
The Fountain

The 7th World Soundtrack Awards were given on 20 October 2007 in Ghent, Belgium.

== Winners ==
- Soundtrack Composer of the Year:
  - Alexandre Desplat for The Painted Veil and The Queen
- Best Original Soundtrack of the Year:
  - The Fountain - Clint Mansell
- Best Original Song Written for a Film:
  - "You Know My Name" from Casino Royale
    - performed by Chris Cornell
- Public Choice Award:
  - The Fountain - Clint Mansell
- Discovery of the Year:
  - Daniel Tarrab and Andres Goldstein - XXY, Inheritance
- Lifetime Achievement Award:
  - Mikis Theodorakis
