= Widow =

Person whose spouse has died

A widow (female) or widower (male) is a person whose spouse has died and who has not remarried. The male form, "widower", is first attested in the 14th century, by the 19th century supplanting "widow" with reference to men. The adjective for either sex is widowed. These terms are not applied to a divorcé(e) following the death of an ex-spouse.

The state of having lost one's spouse to death is termed widowhood. The term widowhood can be used for either sex, at least according to some dictionaries, but the word widowerhood is also listed in some dictionaries. An archaic term for a widow is "relict", literally "someone left over"; this word can sometimes be found on older gravestones. Occasionally, the word viduity is used.

== Effects on health ==
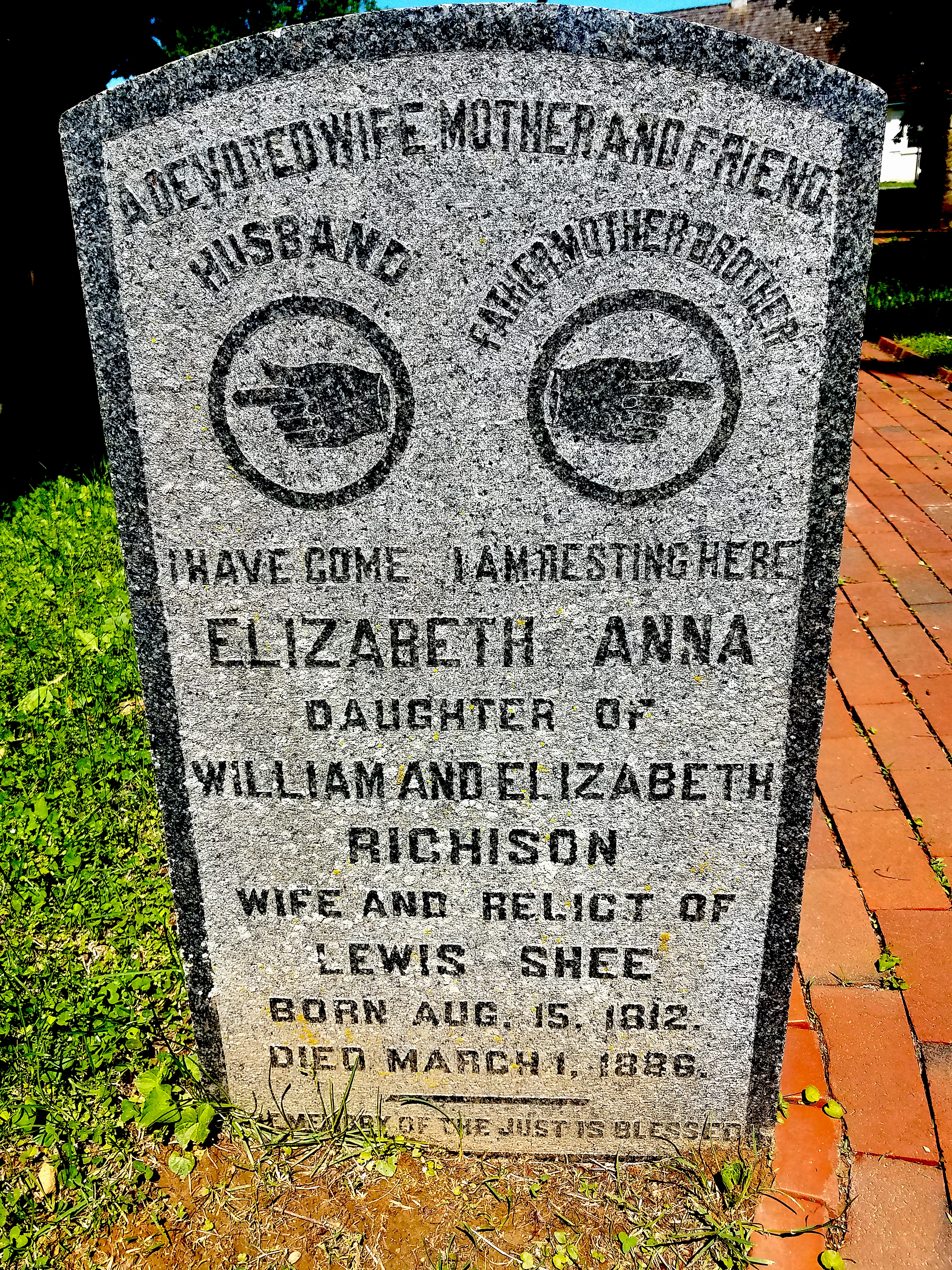
Nineteenth-century gravestone illustrating "relict" used to mean "widow." Located in the churchyard of St. Peter's Church in the Great Valley, Chester County, Pennsylvania.

The increased mortality rate after the death of a spouse is called the widowhood effect. It is "strongest during the first three months after a spouse's death, when they had a 66-percent increased chance of dying". There remains controversy over whether women or men are worse off, and studies have attempted to make each case, while others suggest there are no sex differences.

While it is disputed as to whether sex plays a part in the intensity of grief, sex often influences how a person's lifestyle changes after a spouse's death. Research has shown that the difference falls in the burden of care, expectations, and how they react after the spouse's death. After being widowed, men and women may react very differently and frequently change their lifestyles. Women tend to miss their husbands more if they died suddenly; men tend to miss their wives more if they died after suffering a long terminal illness. In addition, both men and women have been observed to experience lifestyle habit changes after the death of a spouse. Both sexes tend to have a harder time looking after themselves without their spouse to help, though these changes may differ based on the sex of the widow and the role the spouse played in their life.

The older spouses grow, the more aware they are of being alone due to the death of their husband or wife. This negatively impacts the mental as well as physical well-being in both men and women.

== Mourning practices ==
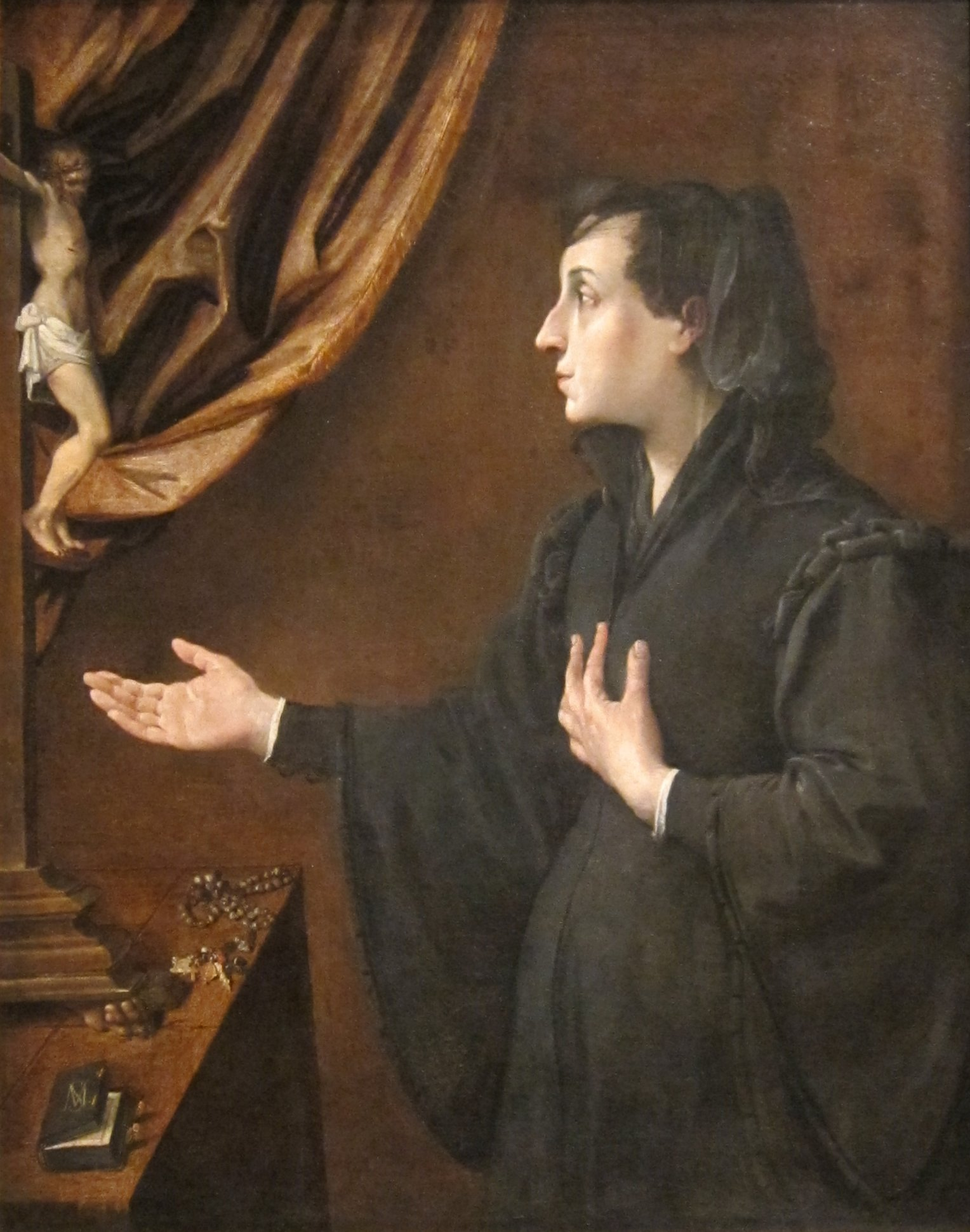
Portrait of a Widow, Ludovico Carracci (circa 1585).

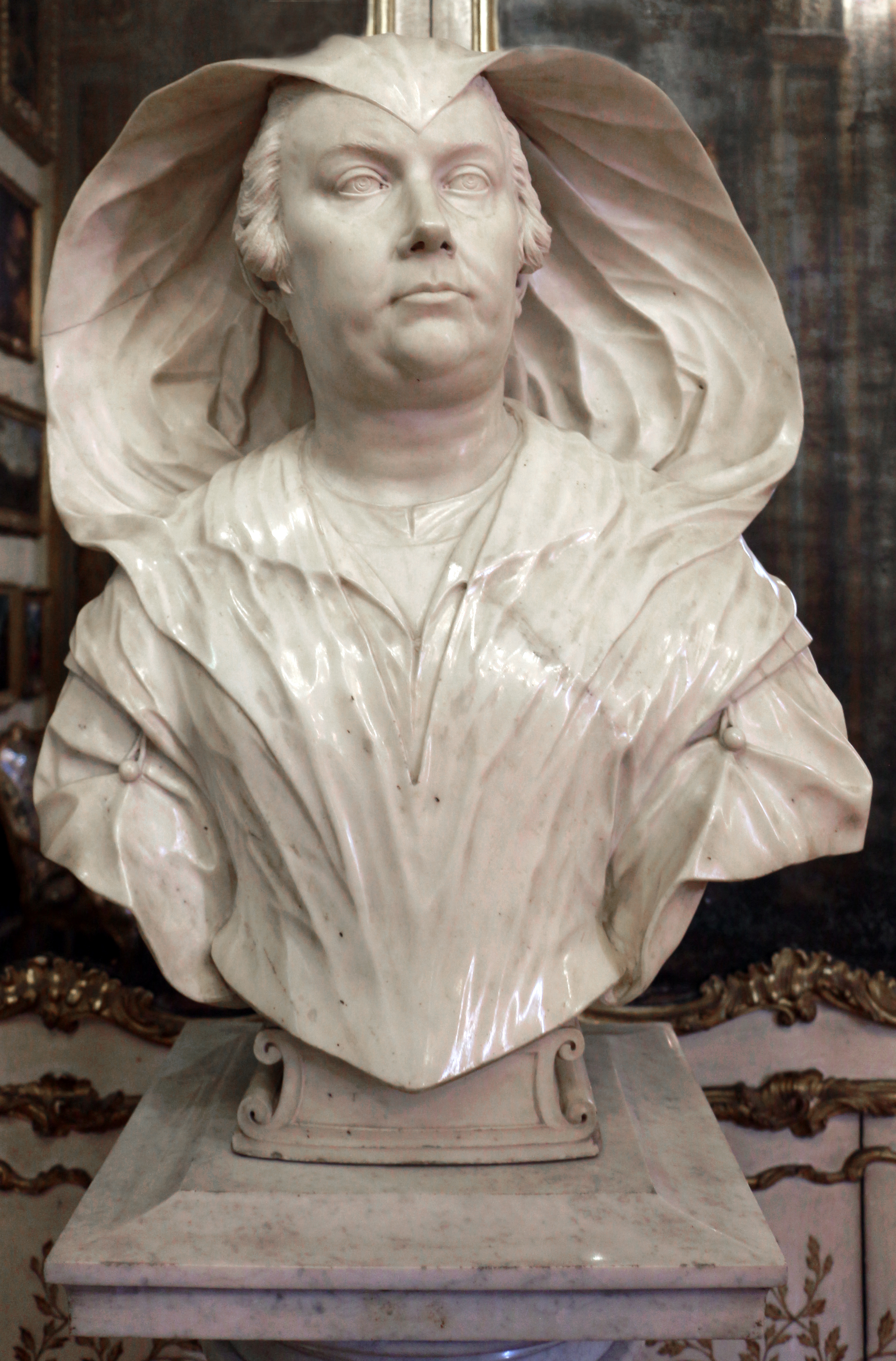
Sculpture of Olimpia Maidalchini wearing a widow's hood.

In some parts of Europe and Latin America, including Russia, Slovakia, the Czech Republic, Greece, Italy, Portugal, Spain and Mexico, widows used to wear black for the rest of their lives to signify their mourning, a practice that has largely died out. Orthodox Christian immigrants may wear lifelong black in the United States to signify their widowhood and devotion to their deceased husband.

After the Hindu Widows' Remarriage Act, 1856 in India, the status of widowhood for Hindu women was accompanied by a body symbolism - The widow's head was shaved as part of her mourning, she could no longer wear a red dot sindoor on her forehead, was forbidden to wear wedding jewellery, had to keep her bosoms uncovered and was expected to walk barefoot. These customs are still prevalent among some Hindus.

In some parts of South Asia, a woman is often accused of causing her husband's death and is not allowed to look at another person as her gaze is considered bad luck.

Some Nigerians prefer a widow to drink the water her dead husband's body was washed in, or otherwise sleep next to her husband's grave for three days.

In the folklore of Chiloé of southern Chile, widows and black cats are important elements that are needed when hunting for the treasure of the carbunclo.

== Economic position ==
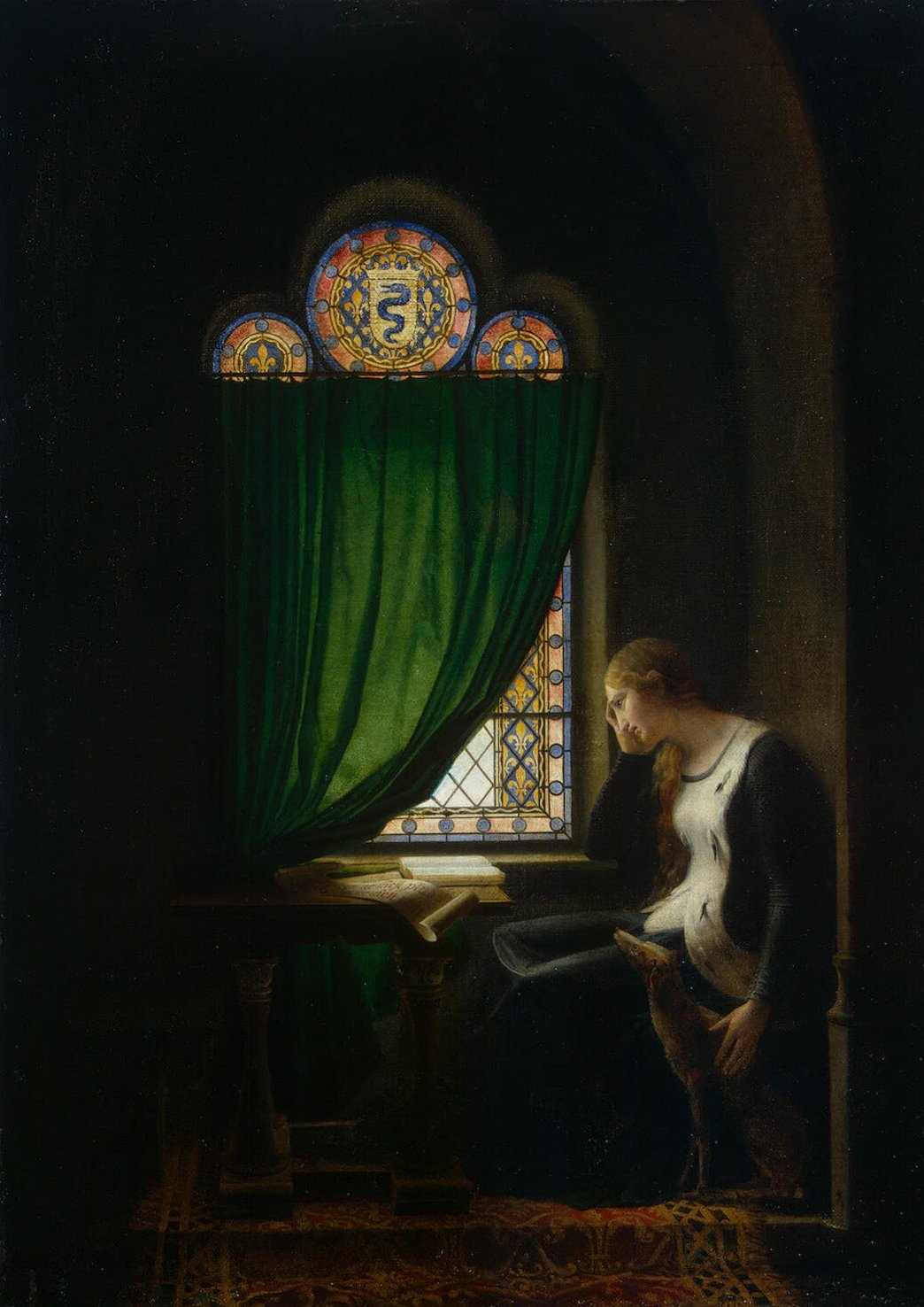
Valentine of Milan Mourning Her Husband the Duke of Orléans, by Fleury-François Richard, 1802. A Troubadour style painting it depicts the aftermath of the Assassination of the Duke of Orleans in 1407.

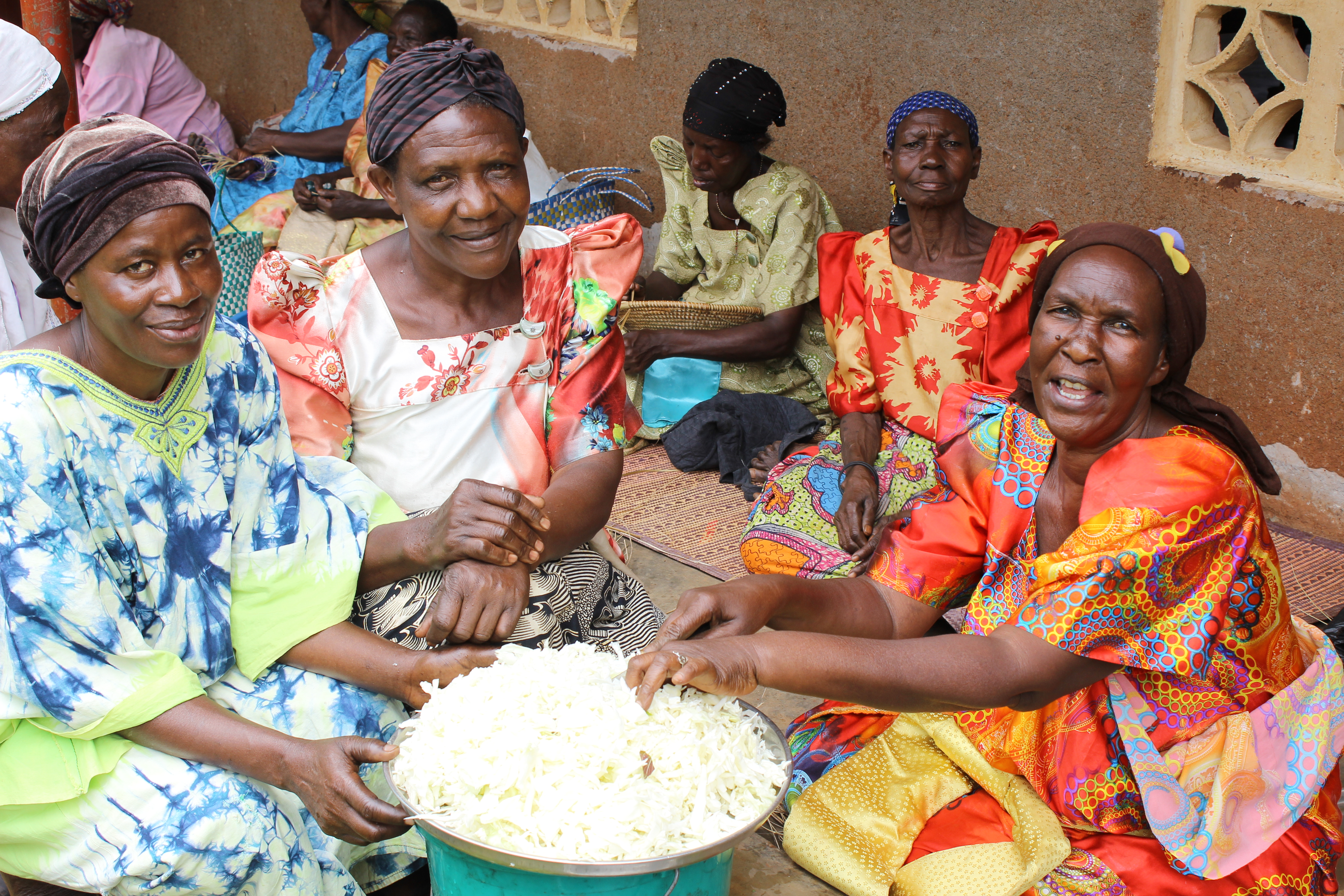
Widows of Uganda supporting each other by working on crafts in order to sell them and make an income

In societies where the husband is the sole provider, his death can leave his family destitute. The tendency for women generally to outlive men can compound this.

The Bible has written several commandments about caring for the widow, the prohibition against harming her and the duty to make her happy during the holidays, for example: "Be joyful at your festival—you, your sons and daughters, your male and female servants, and the Levites, the foreigners, the fatherless and the widows who live in your towns".(Hebrew Bible, Book of Deuteronomy 16:14)

In 19th-century Britain, widows had greater opportunity for social mobility than in many other societies. Along with the ability to ascend socio-economically, widows—who were "presumably celibate"—were much more able (and likely) to challenge conventional sexual behaviour than married women in their society.

It may be necessary for a woman to comply with the social customs of her area because her fiscal stature depends on it, but this custom is also often abused by others as a way to keep money within the deceased spouse's family. It is also uncommon for widows to challenge their treatment because they are often "unaware of their rights under the modern law…because of their low status, and lack of education or legal representation.". Unequal benefits and treatment generally received by widows compared to those received by widowers globally has spurred an interest in the issue by human rights activists. During the HIV pandemic, which particularly hit gay communities, companions of deceased men had little recourse in estate court against the deceased’s family. Not yet able to have been legally married the term widower was not considered socially acceptable. This situation was usually blessed with an added stigma being attached to the surviving man.

As of 2004, women in United States who were widowed younger are at greater economic hardship risk. Married women who are in a financially unstable household are more likely to become widows "because of the strong relationship between mortality [of the male head] and wealth [of the household]." In underdeveloped and developing areas of the world, conditions for widows continue to be much more severe. The United Nations Convention on the Elimination of All Forms of Discrimination against Women (ratified by 135 countries) while slow, is working on proposals which will make certain types of discrimination and treatment of widows (such as violence and withholding property rights) illegal in the countries that have joined CEDAW.

In the United States, Social Security offers a Survivor's Benefit to qualified people once for a loss through their 50th birthday after which a second marriage may be considered when applying for benefits. The maximum still remains the same but here the survivor has options between accessing their earned benefits or one of their qualifying late spouses at chosen intervals to maximize the increased benefits for delaying a filing (i.e. at age 63 claim husband one's reduced benefit, then husband two's full amount at 67 and your own enhanced benefit at 68).

== Abuse ==
=== Sexual violence ===
In parts of Africa, such as Kenya, widows are viewed as impure and in need of cleansing. This often requires having sex with someone. Those refusing to be cleansed risk getting beaten by superstitious villagers, who may also harm the woman and her late husband's children. It is argued that this notion arose from the idea that if a husband dies, the woman may have performed witchcraft against him.

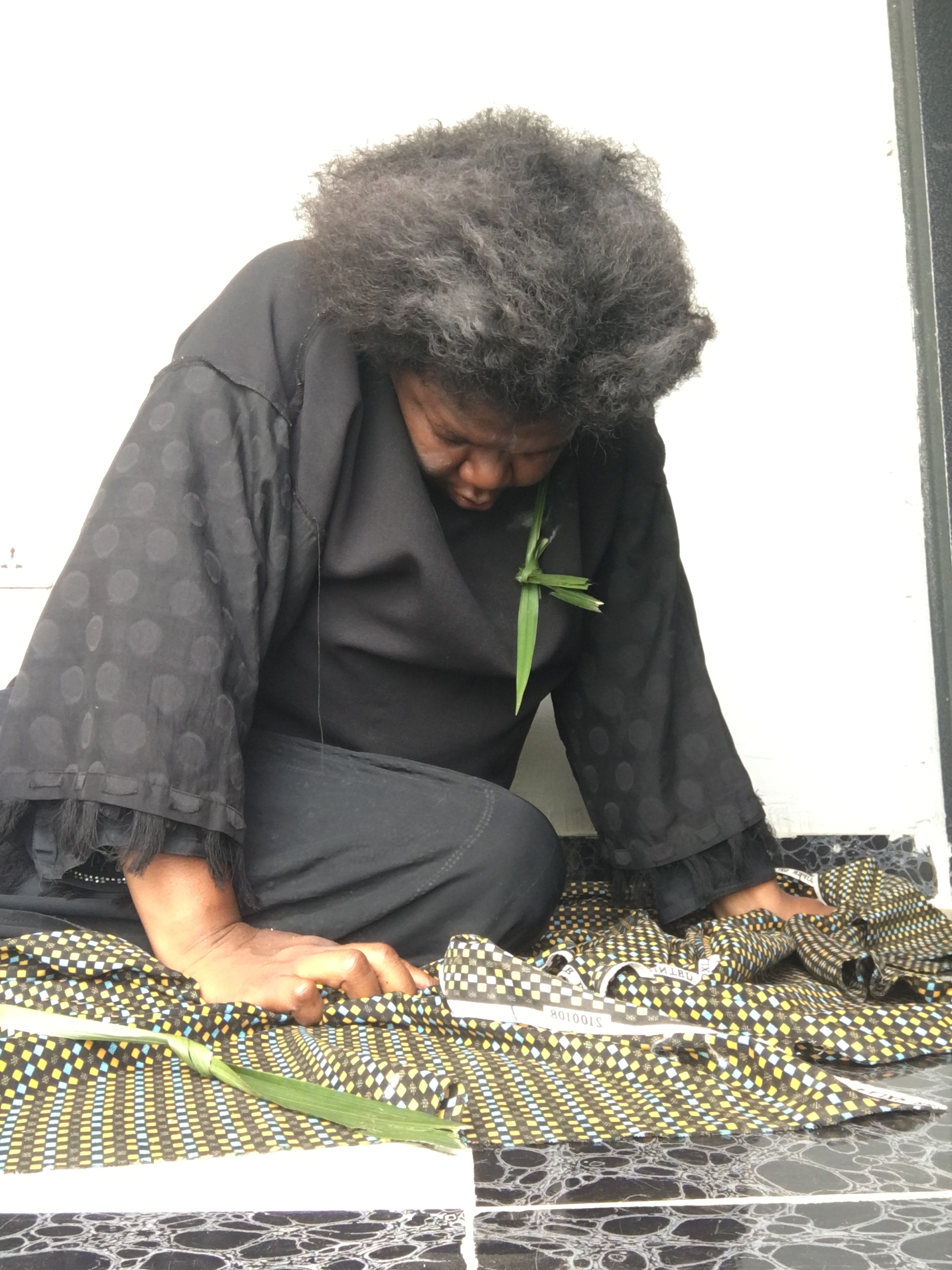
A widow in Nigeria

Use of widows in harem has been recorded in Ancient Egypt, medieval Europe, and Islamic empires.

=== Ritual killing ===
Sati was a practice in South Asia where a woman would immolate herself upon her husband's death. These practices were outlawed in 1827 in British India and again in 1987 in independent India by the Sati Prevention Act, which made it illegal to support, glorify or attempt to commit sati. Support of sati, including coercing or forcing someone to commit sati, can be punished by the death sentence or life imprisonment, while glorifying sati is punishable with one to seven years in prison.

The people of Fiji practised widow-strangling. When Fijians adopted Christianity, widow-strangling was abandoned.

=== Witch hunts ===
Those likely to be accused and killed as witches, such as in Papua New Guinea, are often widows.

=== Forced remarriage ===
Widow inheritance (also known as bride inheritance) is a cultural and social practice whereby a widow is required to marry a male relative of her late husband, often his brother.

=== Banned remarriage ===
The Hindu Widows' Remarriage Act, 1856, enacted in response to the campaign of the reformer Pandit Ishwar Chandra Vidyasagar, to encourage widow remarriage and provided legal safeguards against loss of certain forms of inheritance for remarrying a Hindu widow, though, under the Act, the widow forsook any inheritance due her from her deceased husband.

Social stigma in Joseon Korea required that widows remain unmarried after their husbands' death. In 1477, Seongjong of Joseon enacted the Widow Remarriage Law, which strengthened pre-existing social constraints by barring the sons of widows who remarried from holding public office. In 1489, Seongjong condemned a woman of the royal clan, Yi Guji, when it was discovered that she had cohabited with her slave after being widowed. More than 40 members of her household were arrested and her lover was tortured to death.

=== Theft ===
In some parts of the world, such as Zimbabwe, the property of widows, such as land, is often taken away by her in-laws. While illegal, since most marriages are conducted under customary law and not registered, redressing the issue of property grabbing is complicated.

== See also ==
- Estate planning
- Iddah – a stage of widowhood in Islamic law
- International Widows Day
- Orphan
- Remarriage
- Single parent
- Sati – a rite in Hinduism involving widows
- Widow conservation – the re-marriage of a pastor's widow
- Saint Bridget of Sweden – patron saint of widows
