= Monastery Interior =

Painting by Fleury Rrançois Richard

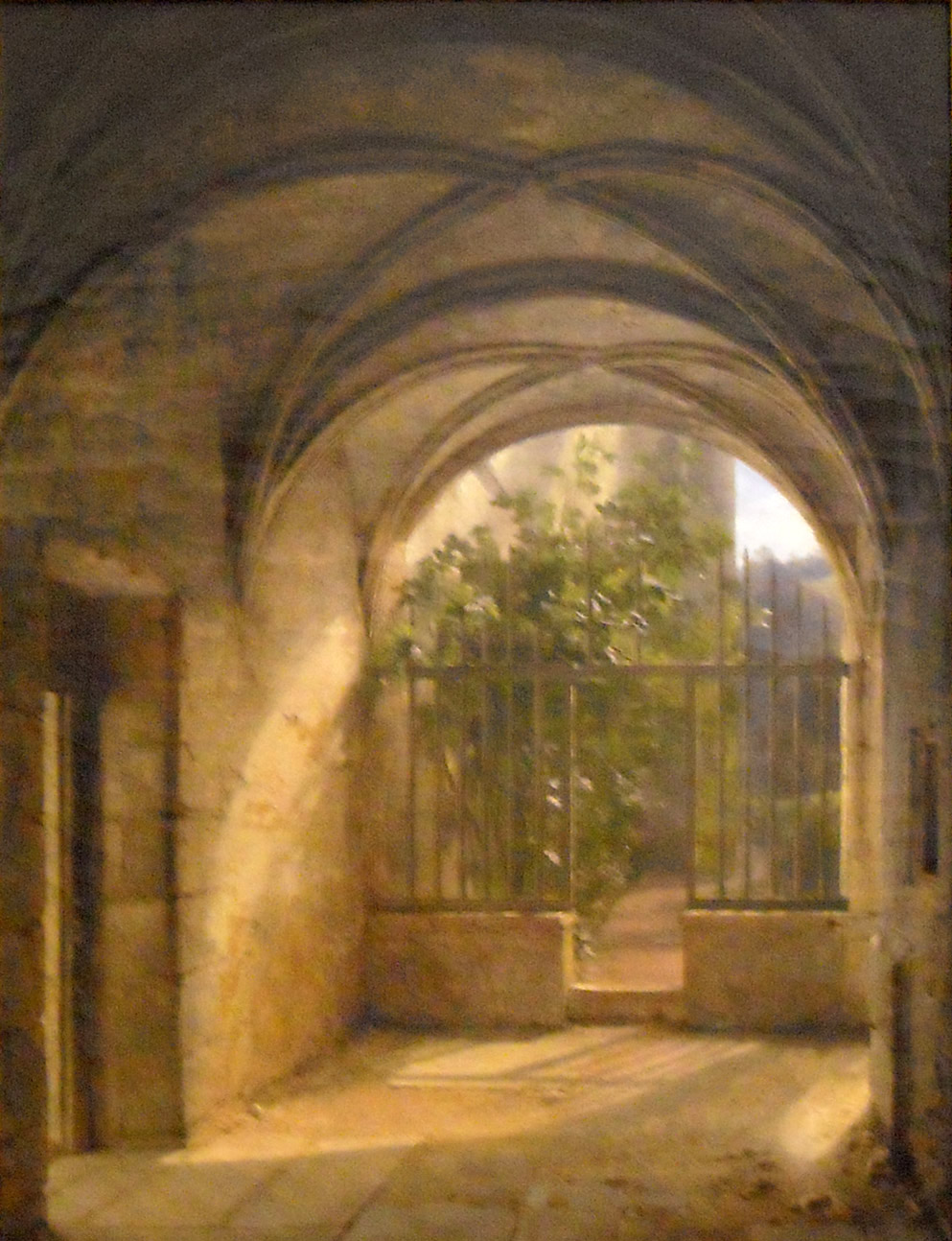
Monastery Interior by Fleury François Richard

Monastery Interior (full title – Monastery Interior - the Cordeliers de l'Observance Monastery) is a 19th-century painting by Fleury François Richard, now in the Museum of Fine Arts of Lyon. It shows part of the former Cordeliers (Franciscan) monastery on the site known as 'Clos des Deux-Amants' – the site is now occupied by the Conservatoire national supérieur de musique et de danse de Lyon.

== Sources ==
- Sylvie Ramond (dir.), Gérard Bruyère et Léna Widerkher, Le Temps de la peinture : Lyon, 1800–1914, Lyon, Fage éditions, 2007, 335 p., ill. en coul. (ISBN 978-2-84975-101-5)
