= Young Woman at a Fountain =

Painting by Fleury François Richard

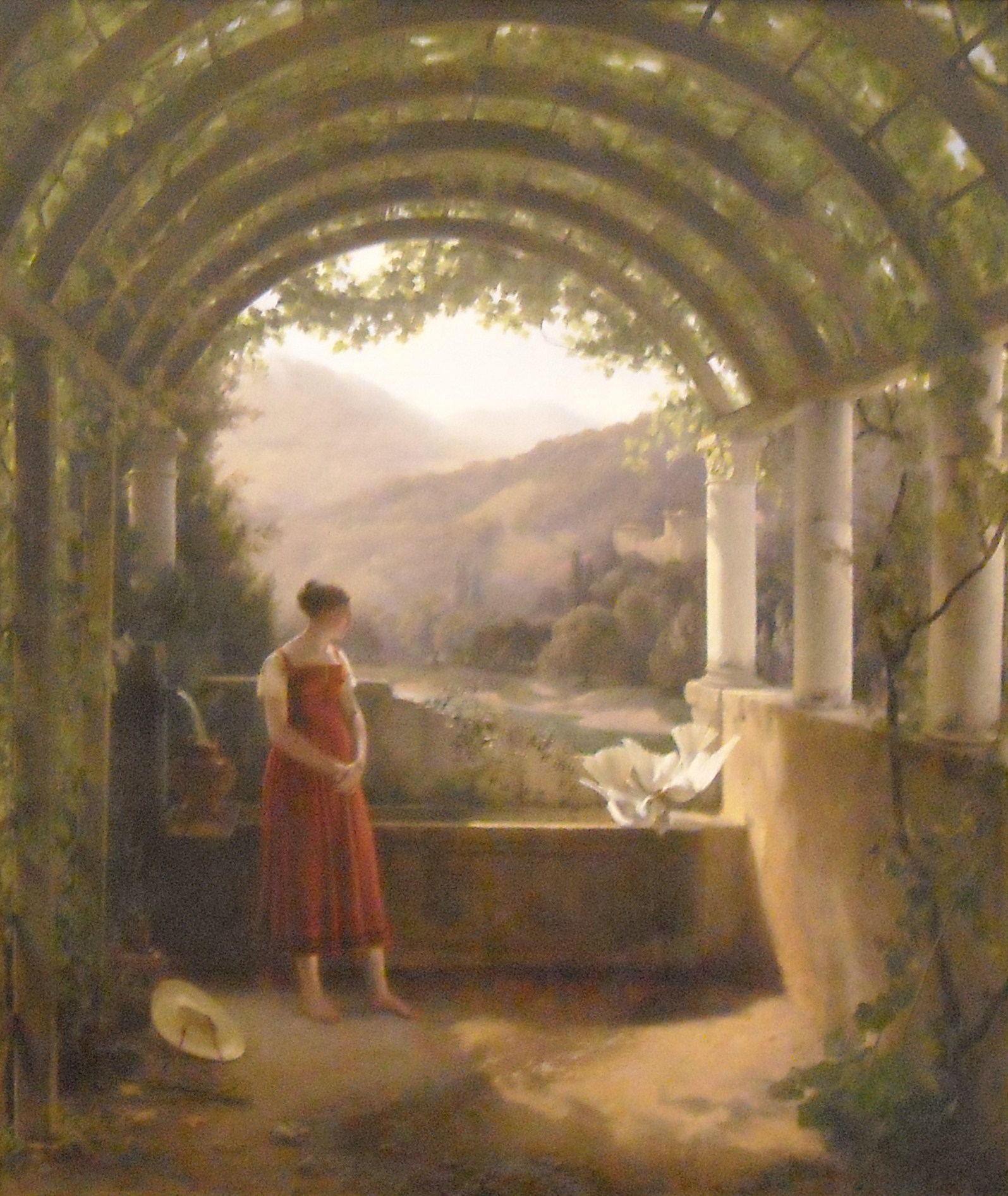
- Artist: Fleury François Richard
- Year: 1824
- Medium: oil on canvas
- Dimensions: 109 cm × 93 cm (43 in × 37 in)
- Location: Museum of Fine Arts of Lyon; Lyon

Young Woman at a Fountain is an oil on canvas painting by French painter Fleury François Richard, from 1824. It is held in the Museum of Fine Arts of Lyon. He painted it from one of his studies of monuments on Île Barbe. It shows a young woman filling a vessel at a fountain whose basin is an ancient Roman sarcophagus reused in the construction of the abbey on the island in 400.

== Sources ==
- Sylvie Ramond (dir.), Gérard Bruyère et Léna Widerkher, Le Temps de la peinture : Lyon, 1800-1914, Lyon, Fage éditions, 2007, 335 p., ill. en coul. (ISBN 978-2-84975-101-5)
