= Vert-Vert (Richard) =

Painting by Fleury François Richard

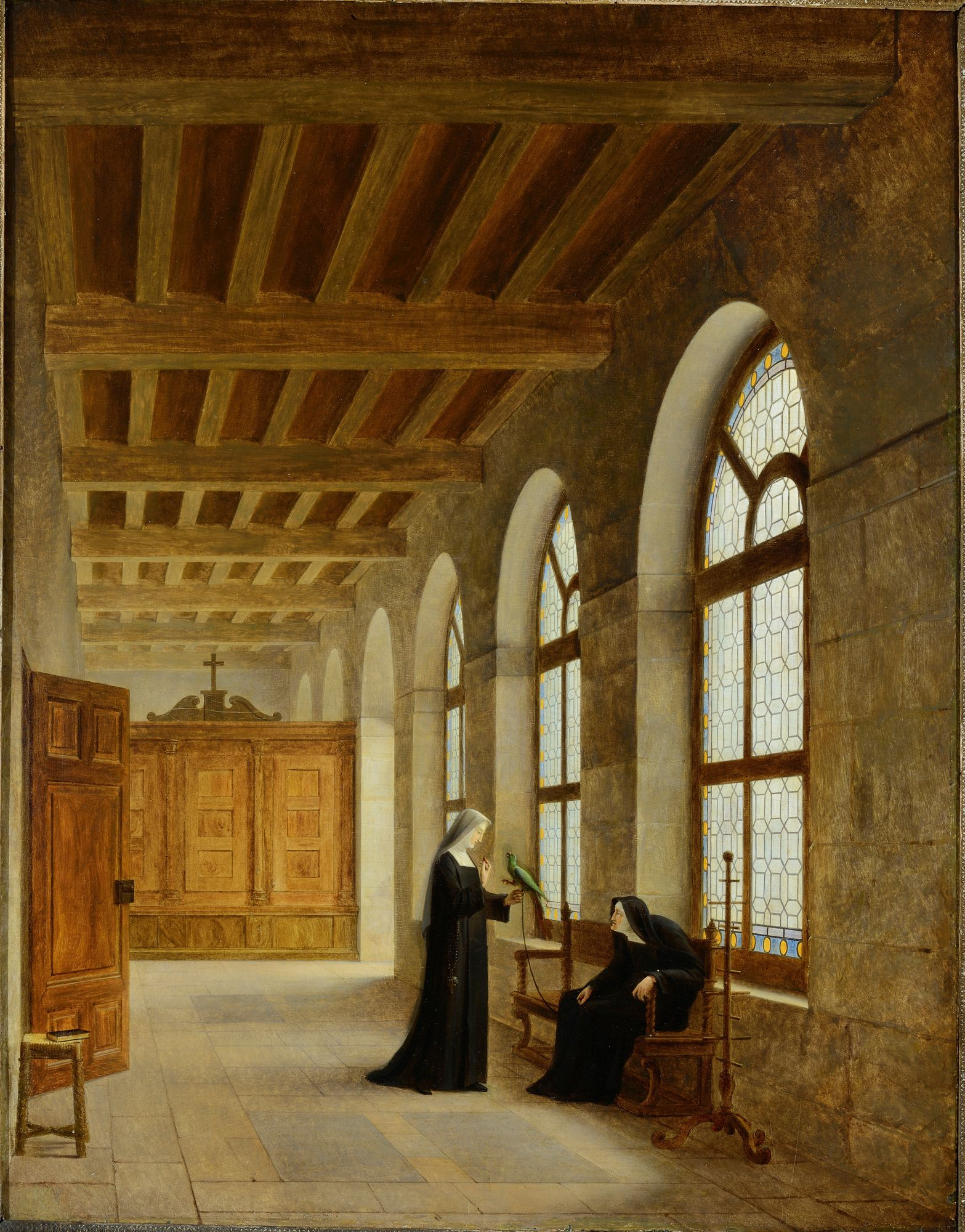
- Artist: Fleury François Richard
- Year: 1804
- Medium: oil on canvas
- Dimensions: 58 cm × 41 cm (23 in × 16 in)
- Location: Museum of Fine Arts of Lyon, Lyon

Vert-Vert is an oil on canvas painting by French painter Fleury François Richard, from 1804. It is named after Vert-Vert, the parrot and eponymous hero of the poem Vert-Vert ou le Voyage du Perroquet de Nevers (1734) by Jean-Baptiste Gresset. Richard exhibited it at the Salon of 1804. It has been in the collection of the Museum of Fine Arts of Lyon since 1820.

== Bibliography ==
- "Fleury François Richard", in Sylvie Ramond (dir.), Gérard Bruyère and Léna Widerkher, Le Temps de la peinture: Lyon, 1800–1914, Lyon, Fage éditions, 2007, 335 p. (ISBN 978-2-84975-101-5) (notice BnF no FRBNF41073771)
