= A Knight at Prayer in a Chapel, Preparing Himself for Combat =

Painting by Fleury Rrançois Richard

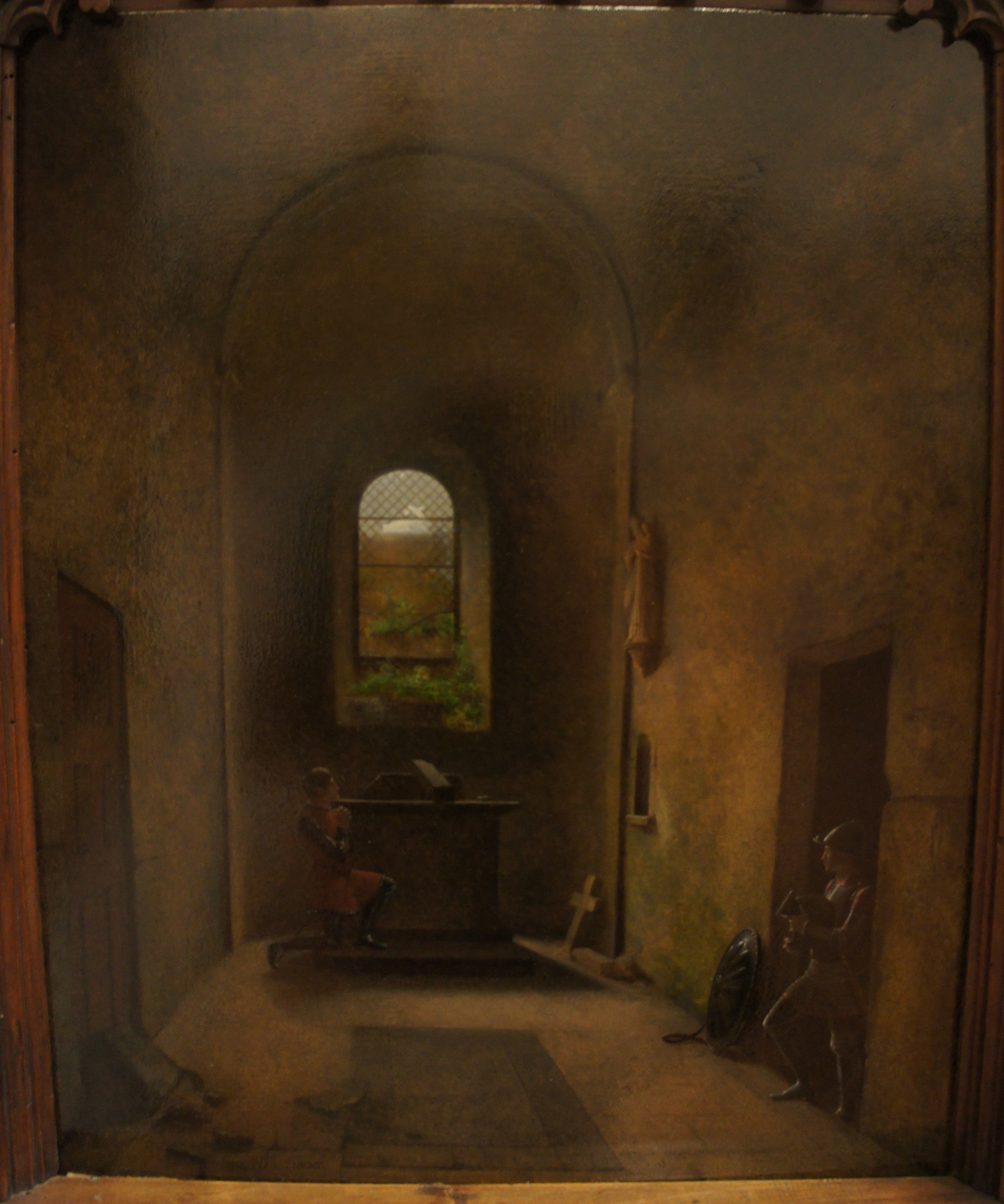
- Artist: Fleury François Richard
- Year: c. 1805
- Medium: oil on wood
- Dimensions: 46.2 cm × 38 cm (18.2 in × 15 in)
- Location: Museum of Fine Arts of Lyon, Lyon

A Knight at Prayer in a Chapel, Preparing Himself for Combat (French: Un Chevalier se préparant au combat) is an oil on wood painting by French painter Fleury François Richard, created c. 1805. It is held at the Musée des Beaux-Arts de Lyon, since 1981.

== History and description ==
According to the artist's description, the painting depicts a knight praying in the chapel of the Église Saint-Irénée de Lyon, which had been ruined by the Baron des Adrets in 1562. The knight is seen kneeling in a prayer in front a tomb, beneath a window. The interior of the chapel is very dark and devoided of any significant decoration. Another knight is seen, at the right, by the door, possibly his squire. He holds the knight's helmet at his hands, while his shield can be seen at his left, leaning at the wall. The light that illuminates the scene comes from the narrow window, at the center of the composition. At the right, an image of the Virgin Mary with the Child Jesus is seen at the upper wall. Another larger door is seen at the left.

== Reception ==
The painting was shown in the Paris Salon of 1806, and highly praised by Pierre-Jean-Baptiste Chaussard, although he argued that if the date was supposed to be after 1562 as the artist stated, then the armour was of the wrong period, and the walls of the chapel insufficiently ruined.
