= Comminges and Adelaide in the Trappist Monastery =

Painting by Fleury François Richard

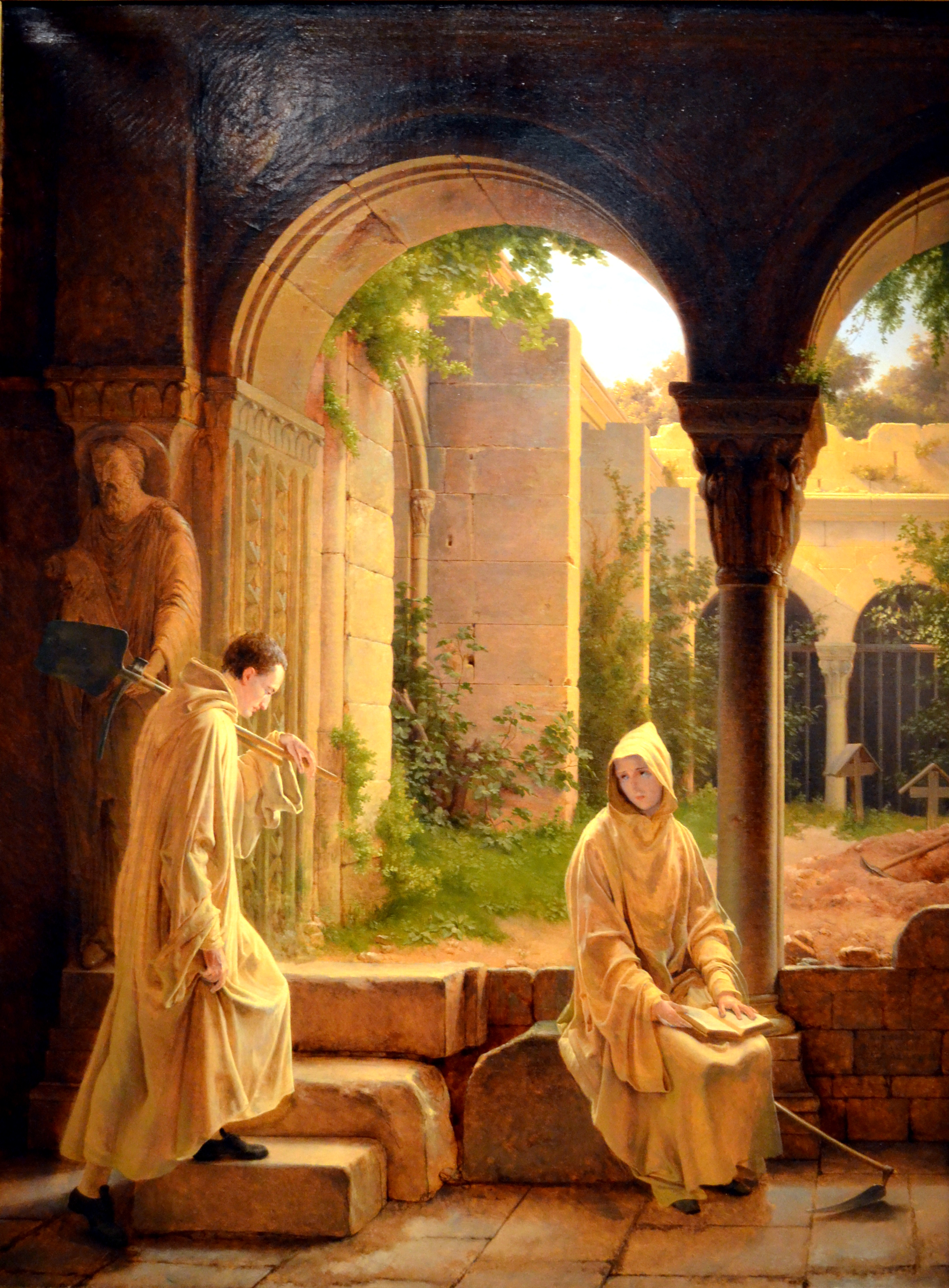
- Artist: Fleury François Richard
- Year: c. 1822-1844
- Medium: oil on canvas
- Dimensions: 125 cm × 92.5 cm (49 in × 36.4 in)
- Location: Museum of Fine Arts of Lyon; Lyon

Comminges and Adelaide in the Trappist Monastery or Comminges digging his own tomb watched by Adelaide disguised as a monk is the final painting by Fleury François Richard, produced between 1822 and 1844 and now in the Museum of Fine Arts of Lyon.

== History and description ==
Its subject is drawn from Les Amans malheureux, ou le Comte de Comminge (1764), a play adapted by François-Thomas-Marie de Baculard d'Arnaud from the tragic love story of Mémoires du comte de Comminge (1735) by Claudine Guérin de Tencin.

The painting depicts "Comminges digging his own grave under the eyes of Adelaide disguised as a monk”. In this tragic love story, similarly to Romeo and Juliet or Tristan and Isolde, Comminges and Adélaïde see their loves thwarted by their respective families. Comminges believing that Adelaide is dead moves to La Trappe Abbey. Adelaide, having found him, decides to use the disguise of a monk to live with him without his knowledge. Its only at the time of Adelaide's death that Comminges finally recognizes her.

The painting is set in the cloister of the convent, Comminges is seen coming from the left, sadly carrying a shovel, that he is using to dig a grave, seen at the background. Adelaide is seated in her monk disguise, with a book in her lap, looking sadly in his direction. She also has her own shovel nearby.

== Sources ==
- Marie-Claude Chaudonneret, Fleury Richard et Pierre Révoil: la peinture troubadour, Paris, Arthena, 1980, 217 p.
