= Montaigne Visiting Torquato Tasso in Prison (Richard) =

1821 painting by Fleury François Richard

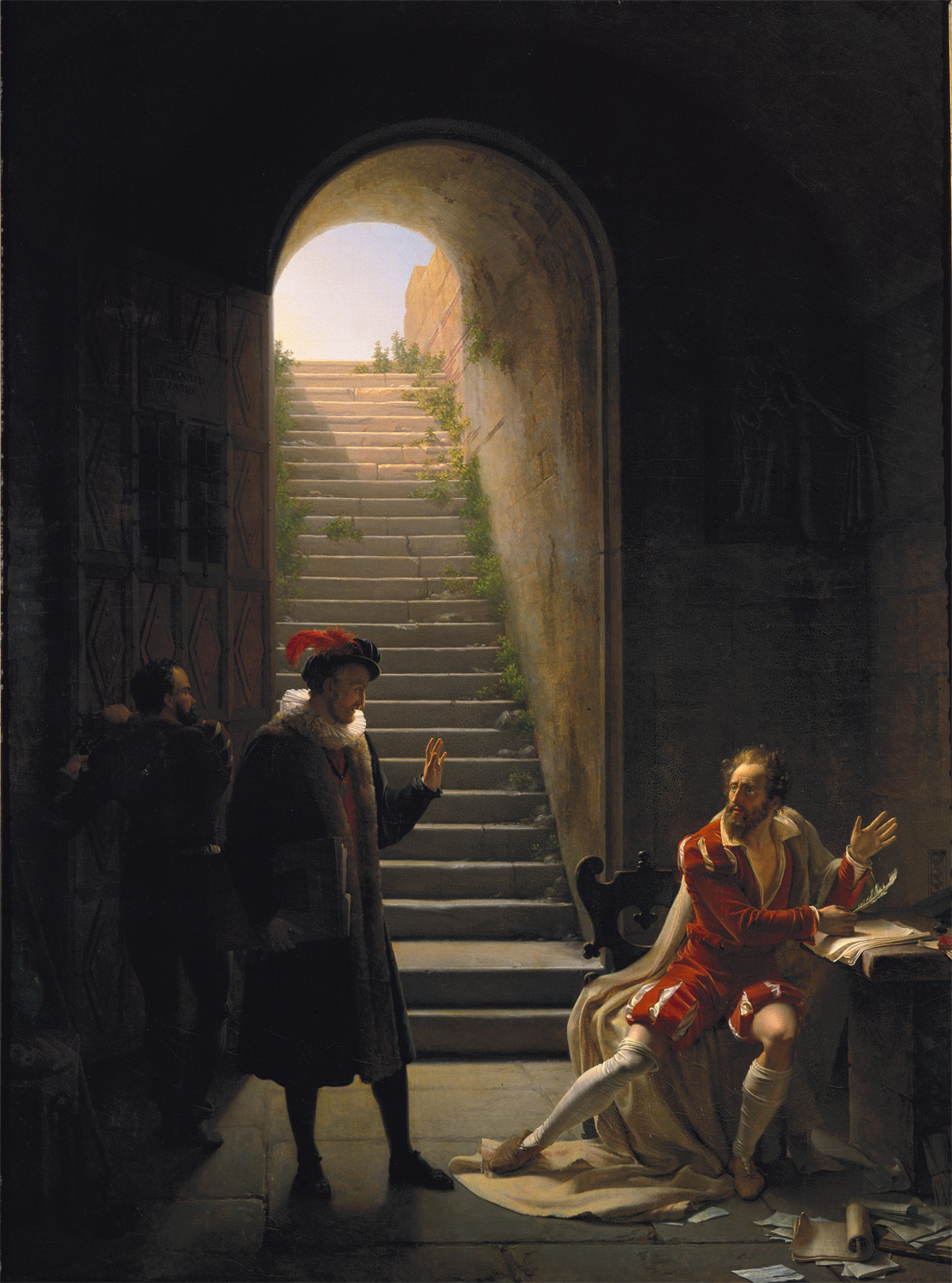
- Artist: Fleury François Richard
- Year: 1821
- Medium: Oil on canvas
- Dimensions: 135 cm × 100 cm (53 in × 39 in)
- Location: Museum of Fine Arts of Lyon; Lyon

Montaigne Visiting Torquato Tasso in Prison (French: Le Tasse en prison visité par Montaigne or Le Tasse et Montaigne) is an oil on canvas painting by French painter Fleury François Richard, created in 1821. It was acquired by the Museum of Fine Arts of Lyon, in 1822, at the request of baron Rambaud, mayor of Lyon. It was first exhibited at the Paris Salon of 1822. It is one of the artist's last paintings, showing Torquato Tasso being visited by Montaigne while in prison.

== History ==
Contrary to what the title implies, Tasso was not imprisoned. He was actually locked up in a hospital for the insane in Ferrara, Italy, the Ospedale di Sant' Anna, due to a mental illness. The fact that the hospital here takes the appearance of a chapel shows the little importance that the artist gives to the conditions of Tasso's confinement as well as to the historical context of the situation: what matters is the condition of the character, both physical and psychological, and the representation of the setting is in line with the perception he himself may have of it.

This painting is inspired by a real event, the visit that Montaigne paid to Tasso in the asylum where he was locked up, but does not respect the historical truth. Here, the place does not appears to be a hospital, nor any place of confinement, nor a prison (a term which is nevertheless used as the title of the painting). It is represented as a chapel, with its vaults and refined architecture.

== Description ==
The work is quite imposing and is inspired by a historical event, when the French philosopher Montaigne visited Tasso in the Ferrara hospital. Richard stages the scene in an underground chapel, in order to represent strong contrasts of light, a feature which fascinated him. The chapel is represented as an underground space which is reached by a narrow staircase. Monasticism was a theme appreciated by the author, and cloisters one of his favorite settings, so it is not surprising to find its characteristics here. The dark walls seem that are made of stone, as does the floor, which takes on a light, matte shade where the sun hits it. The architecture, even if there are only a few elements here, is medieval in style. The stairs are represented in a very sober manner, and the vault which overhangs them accentuates the effect of narrowness and darkness of the place, in opposition to the bright light which comes from outside.

No great attention is given to the details of the decor, the emphasis is placed instead on the characters, in particular those who are at the center of the painting.

On the left, dressed in dark clothes, Montaigne blends into the darkness of the prison. On the right, Tasso is shown seated on a chair, dressed in the exuberance of colors characteristic of the Renaissance. The opposition between these two figures is clearly represented: the shadow which hides the face and the silhouette of the philosopher is opposed by the light that bathes Tasso, surrounded by the confusion and disorder representative of his inner state. The light on the character highlights his condition, and according to François Pupil, the "scattered papers are an obvious sign of Tasso's desperate inspiration." His brightly colored attire and the presence of the color red, sometimes a symbol of madness, contrast with the calm, careful appearance and reserved elegance of Montaigne.

== Analysis ==
In this work, the painter stages a theatrical and stereotyped madness thanks to the dramatization created by the arrival of the light from the front, which illuminates Tasso. According to the book La peinture lyonnaise au XIXe siècle (1995), "The lighting points are very localized; restricted to a single central bay which creates a simple, theatrical and striking effect". Montaigne, for his part, detaches himself from the light. In addition, a strong contrast is created between dark areas and bright ones. The theatricality also comes from the opposition in the representation of the outfits of the two main characters, produced with extreme care, even if the difference of lighting predominates and relegates them to the background. These lighting effects are inspired by the chapel of Saint Irenaeus, which is also the setting for another painting by Richard, Saint Blandina.

This work shows a miserable image of a man through the character of Tasso, mad and exposed to everyone's gaze, and seeks to inspire pity with this representation which directly questions psychology and the human condition.

== Influence ==
Richard's painting, with the simplicity of his features, his Dutch inspired execution and the serene expression of his characters, inspired Jacquand for his painting Thomas Morus.

The subject of Tasso in prison can be found in several contemporary painters. However, it was the work of Eugène Delacroix, Tasso In the Madhouse, painted in 1839, exploring the same subject, which became the most renowned, because it highlights the tragedy of the scene by representing more of the violence and malice of Tasso than of the wisdom and humanity of Montaigne. This painting inspired the poet Charles Baudelaire to write the sonnet On Tasso in Prison, in the collection Les Épaves.

== Sources ==
- M. Stuffmann, N. Miller, K. Stierle, Eugène Delacroix, Reflections: Tasso In the Madhouse, 2008.
