= Scene in a Ruined Chapel =

Painting by Fleury Rrançois Richard

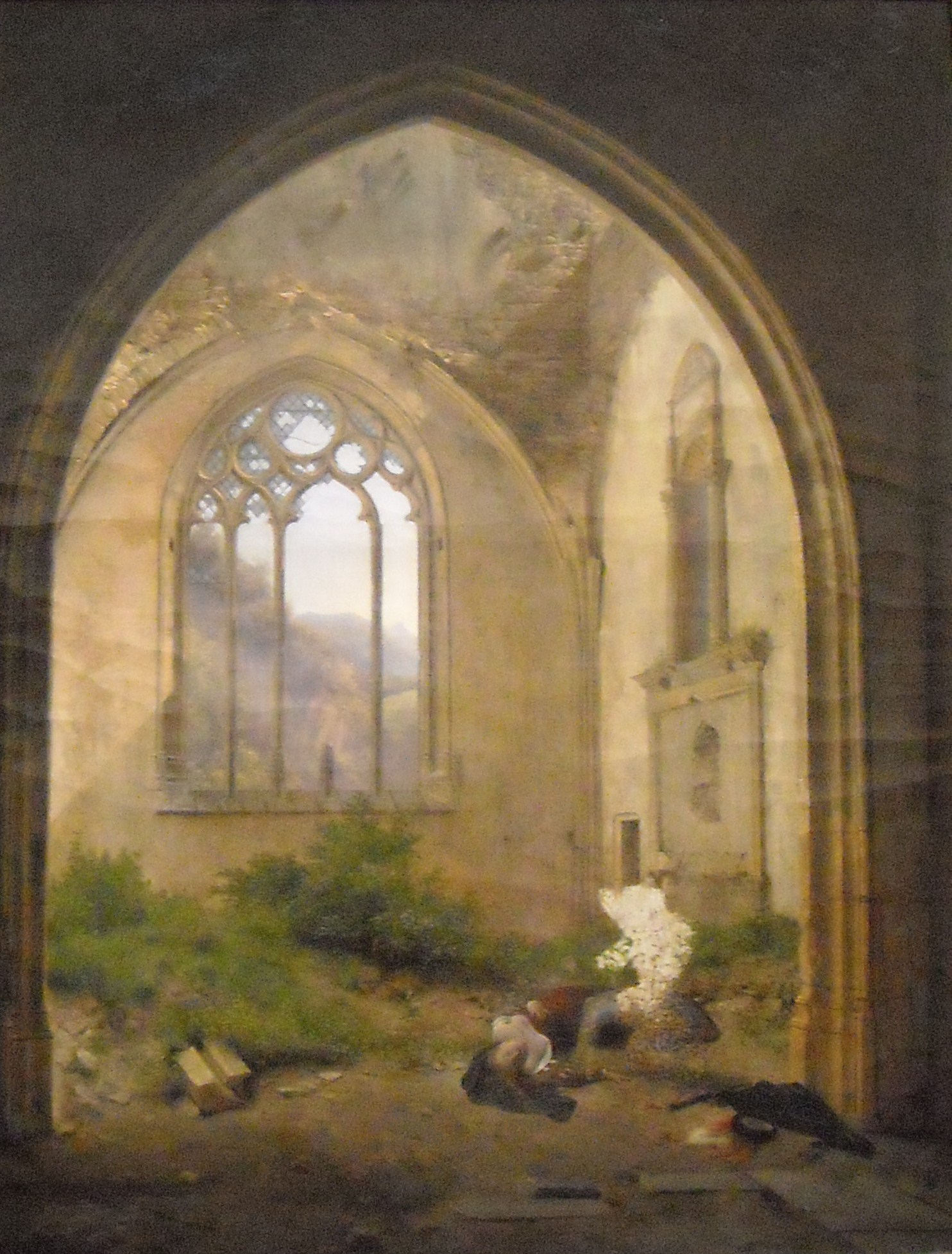
- Artist: Fleury François Richard
- Year: 1824
- Medium: oil on canvas
- Dimensions: 48.5 cm × 38 cm (19.1 in × 15 in)
- Location: Museum of Fine Arts of Lyon; Lyon

Scene in a Ruined Chapel is an oil on canvas painting by French painter Fleury François Richard, from 1824. It is held at the Museum of Fine Arts of Lyon.

== Description ==
The scene shows a typical interest of romantic painters, the ruins of ancient religious or secular buildings, often from the Middle Ages. In this case, Richard depicts the interior of a long ruined chapel of church. A woman lies enigmatically in the ground, at the center of the composition, for unknown reasons. Her presence there adds to the mystery of the scene.
