= Jean-Marie Jacomin =

French painter (1789–1858)

Jean-Marie Jacomin (1789, Lyon - 6 May 1858, Lyon) was a French painter.

== Life ==
The son of Jean Antoine Jacomin and Marie Hélène Ravier, he studied at the drawing school in Lyon before being taught by Pierre Révoil in the École des Beaux-arts de Lyon from 1807 to 1813. He painted military subjects, genre paintings, portraits and interiors and also produced engravings and lithographs, such as Portrait of the artist, Eight heads of artists from Lyon and The Good Samaritan. His works include A sculptor's studio and the interior of a cloister (Paris, 1819), Wounded soldier telling war stories (Paris, 1822), Leaving for hospital (Paris, 1824), Young woman surprised by an escaping bird (Lyon, 1827). His works are held in museums and galleries in Avignon, Lons-le-Saunier and Lyon (MBA) among others.

In Lyon he exhibited portraits of abbé François Rozier, Révoil and the painters Thiénat, Fleury François Richard and Antoine Berjon, along with his own self-portrait. He married the painter Françoise Riondellet (1803-1853).

== Bibliography ==
- Exhibition catalogue for Les années romantiques, la peinture française de 1815 à 1850, musée des Beaux-arts de Nantes 1995-1996 et Galeries nationales du Grand-Palais Paris 1996.
