= Marriage and health =

Marriage and health are closely related. Married people experience lower morbidity and mortality across such diverse health threats as cancer, heart attacks, and surgery. There are gender differences in these effects that may be partially due to men's and women's relative status. Most research on marriage and health has focused on heterosexual couples, and more work is needed to clarify the health effects on same-sex marriage. Simply being married, as well as the quality of one's marriage, has been linked to diverse measures of health. Research has examined the social-cognitive, emotional, behavioral and biological processes involved in these links.

== Compared to other relationships ==
Beyond marriage, social relationships more broadly have a powerful impact on health. A meta-analysis of 148 studies found that those with stronger social relationships had a 50% lower risk of all-cause mortality. Conversely, loneliness is associated with increased risk for cardiovascular disease, and all-cause mortality. Little work has directly compared the health impacts of marriage compared to those of non-romantic relationships, such as connections with friends or colleagues. However, there are several reasons why marriage may exert a greater health impact than other relationships, even other cohabiting relationships: married couples spend time together during a wide variety of activities, such as eating, leisure, housekeeping, child-care and sleep. Spouses also share resources and investments such as joint finances or home-ownership. Relative to other relationships, the increased interdependence of marriage serves as a source for more intense support.

Romantic couples who live together, but are unmarried, may represent a middle ground in health benefits between those who are married, and those who self-identify as single. However, people live together without getting married for many different reasons; cohabitation may serve as a prelude to marriage. Selection factors of race, ethnicity, and social-economic status predispose certain groups to cohabit unmarried, and these factors also affect the health benefits of marriage and cohabitation.

== Same-sex marriage ==
Most research on marriage and health has studied heterosexual couples. Same-sex and opposite-sex couples share many similarities. Both begin marriage with high levels of relationship satisfaction, followed by later declines, and both argue with similar frequency about similar issues.

However, same-sex couples resolve conflicts more effectively, and distribute household labor more fairly compared to their heterosexual counterparts. Same-sex marriage is or was illegal in many countries, including many parts of the United States (where much research on marriage and health has been conducted) until 2015. In these regions same-sex couples are not granted the institutional protections of marriage or its accompanying legal barriers to relationship dissolution. Moreover, same-sex couples are more likely to experience discrimination against their sexual orientation, contributing to problems with mental health and relationship quality.

== Gender differences ==
The health-protective effect of marriage is stronger for men than women. Marital status — the simple fact of being married — confers more health benefits to men than women. Women's health is more strongly impacted than men's by marital conflict or satisfaction, such that unhappily married women do not enjoy better health relative to their single counterparts. Laboratory studies indicate that women have stronger physiological reactions than men in response to marital conflict.

These gender differences may be partially due to men's and women's relative status in a relationship. Research in humans and animals suggests subordinate status is linked to greater physiological reactions to social stress. Indeed, subordinate spouses show greater physiological reactions to arguments with their partner. Both husbands and wives show stronger physiological reactions to arguments when making demands for change from their partner. Women's heightened physiological reactions to marital conflict may be due to their relative subordinate position in marriage.

== Measuring health ==
Research on the links between marriage and health has measured diverse outcomes. These are broadly categorized as clinical endpoints, surrogate endpoints, and biological mediators. Clinical endpoints are variables which affect how people feel, function, and survive. They are recognized as important outcomes by health care providers and patients, for instance being hospitalized, or having a heart-attack.

Surrogate endpoints and biological mediators are types of biomarkers—objective indicators of normal or pathological physiological processes. Surrogate endpoints serve to substitute for clinical endpoints. They are expected to predict clinical endpoints, based on scientific evidence. For example, elevated blood pressure has been found to predict cardiovascular disease.

Biological mediators reflect short-term sources of stress which affect health outcomes through repeated or persistent activation. These processes do not have a sufficient evidence base linking them to clinical endpoints in order be elevated to the class of surrogate endpoints. Examples include changes in hormone levels, or immune measures.

== Links to health ==
=== Selection and protection ===
The health benefits of marriage are a result of both selection and protection effects. People with better health, more resources, and less stress are more likely to marry, and marriage brings resources, and social support. The health benefits of marriage persist even after controlling for selection effects, indicating that being married is protective of health.

=== Social support: two models ===
Research on marriage and health is part of the broader study of the benefits of social relationships. Social ties provide people with a sense of identity, purpose, belonging and support. Two main models describe how social support influences health.

The main-effects model proposes that social support is good for one's health, regardless of whether or not one is under stress. The stress-buffering model proposes that social support acts as a buffer against the negative effects of stress occurring outside the relationship. Both models have received empirical support, depending on how social support is conceptualized and measured. Marriage should be a strong source of social support in both models.

=== Observed social dynamics of couples ===
There are several interesting social norms between couples that are relevant towards forming health-related habits. Couples have a higher chance of accomplishing a goal when they collaborate, as opposed to achieving the same goal as individuals. In addition, couples' habits play an important role in influencing the health habits of their children. As a result, shared activities among couples can help develop stronger relationships that can lead to other health and long-term benefits. There are several interesting social norms between couples that are relevant towards forming health-related habits. Examples include:

- Eating Dynamics: Couples like to eat together, and although they perform divergent activities during the day, they often 'come together and look forward to dinner'. In addition, couples have an affinity to grocery-shop together, which is an important opportunity to make household decisions towards healthy eating.
- Reduced Exercise Patterns: Time constraints and other obligations often deter couples from regularly exercising. In particular, their stable relationships often propel them to "let go" and be less concerned about their physique. In societies with strong conformist dynamics, some partners are less likely to exercise unless they go with a companion.
- Re-evaluation of Attitudes Towards Health: As couples adopt to new lifestyles, they concurrently re-assess their current attitudes towards health. In this crucial phase, partners are more likely to integrate new knowledge and practical skills towards a health-related lifestyles.
- Encouragement and Praise vs. Criticism and Nagging: Verbal support from a spouse, such as encouragement and praise, helps improve physical activity achievement, whereas support disguised as "criticism" and nagging are often detrimental.
- Comparison Anxiety: Anecdotal accounts provide hints on the detrimental effects of comparing exercise progress. Couples may have different rates of progress, and for some partners, comparisons could lead to discouragement. A more collaborative approach towards a unified goal has been found to be more beneficial.

=== Spousal adherence to fitness programs ===
There exists several studies specifically examining the effect of spousal engagement on exercise program adherence. For example, one study examined healthy couples' behavior based on a 12-month fitness program where researchers tracked the behaviors between 30 married individuals vs. 32 married pairs- that is, people who had joined the exercise program together (as pairs) or by themselves (individually). Their results reveal statistically significant differences: at the end of the study, 6.3% of the married-pairs had dropped out of the program, compared to 43% of the married individuals. These findings are consistent with previous research, and they point to the notion that social support in the form of "spousal participation" exerts beneficial effect on adherence towards fitness programs, or in general, most types of health-related joint endeavor.

== Links to mental health ==
Consistently, studies have shown that couples with marital status have shown to have lower rates of mental health disorders than their counterparts being divorced or never married. Marriage has been seen to be beneficial to meeting the social and intimacy needs of individuals as well as increasing their sense of social status among their peers.

== Marital quality ==
While simply being married is associated on average with better health, the health impacts of marriage are affected by marital quality. High marital quality is typically characterized as high self-reported satisfaction with the relationship, generally positive attitudes toward one's spouse, and low levels of hostile and negative behavior. Conversely, low marital quality is characterized as low self-reported satisfaction with the relationship, generally negative attitudes toward one's spouse, and high levels of hostile and negative behavior. A troubled marriage is a significant source of stress, and limits one's ability to seek support from other relationships. Unmarried people are, on average, happier than those unhappily married. A meta-analysis of 126 studies found that greater marital quality is related to better health, with effect sizes comparable to those of health behaviors such as diet and exercise. Explanations for the links between marital quality and health focus on social-cognitive and emotional processes, health behaviors, and a bidirectional association with mental illness.

=== Social-cognitive processes ===
People in happy marriages may think about their relationship differently from people in troubled marriages. Unhappily married people often hold their partner responsible for negative behaviors, but attribute positive behavior to other factors—for example, "she came home late because she doesn't want to spend time with me; she came home early because her boss told her to." Blaming one's partner for their negative behavior is associated with prolonged elevations of the stress hormone cortisol after an argument. Spouses in troubled marriages are also likely to misattribute their partners' communication as criticism. However, the links between these social-cognitive processes and health remain understudied.

=== Emotional processes ===
Higher levels of negative emotions and less effective emotional disclosure may be involved in linking marital quality and health. People in troubled marriages experience more negative emotions, particularly hostility. Negative emotions have been linked to elevated blood pressure and heart rate, and to increased levels of stress hormones, which may lead to ill health. Emotional disclosure often occurs in well-functioning marriages, and is linked to a host of health benefits, including fewer physician visits and missed work days. However, people in troubled marriages are less skillful in emotional disclosure.

=== Health behaviors ===
Health behaviors such as diet, exercise and substance use, may also affect the interplay of marital quality and health. The health behaviors of married couples converge over time, such that couples who have been married many years have similar behavior. One explanation is that spouses influence or control one another's health behaviors. A spouse's positive control techniques, such as modeling a healthy behavior, increase their partner's intentions to improve health behaviors, whereas negative control techniques, such as inducing fear, do not affect intentions. Marital support may increase the psychological resources—such as self-efficacy, and self-regulation—needed to improve one's health behaviors.

=== Mental illness ===
Marital problems predict the onset of mental illness, including anxiety, mood, and substance use disorders. Much research has focused on depression, showing a bidirectional connection with marital conflict. Marital distress interacts with existing susceptibility, increasing risk for depression. Conversely, depressive behavior such as excessive reassurance-seeking can be burdensome for one's spouse, who may respond with criticism or rejection. The links between depression and ill health are well established; depression is associated with immune system dysregulation, and poor health behaviors, such as lack of exercise, poor sleep and diet, and increased substance abuse.

=== Biological pathways ===
Dysregulation of the cardiovascular, neuroendocrine and immune systems is implicated in the links between marital quality and health.

==== Cardiovascular reactivity ====
Marital conflict, and seeking change from one's spouse evokes a cardiovascular reaction, increasing heart rate and blood pressure. Couples who are more hostile during arguments have stronger cardiovascular reactions. Heightened cardiovascular reactions are associated with increased risk for cardiovascular disease.

==== Neuroendocrine system ====
Hormones produced by the sympathetic-adrenal-medullary axis (SAM) and hypothalamic-pituitary-adrenal axis (HPA) have wide-ranging effects across the body. Both axes have been implicated in the links between psychological factors and physical health. SAM activity can be measured by levels of circulating catecholamines—epinephrine and norepinephrine. Negative interactions with one's spouse have been linked to elevated catecholamine levels, both during and after conflict.

Daily fluctuations in the level of cortisol—a stress hormone—are an important marker of health; flatter slopes of cortisol change throughout the day are strongly associated with cardiovascular disease and related mortality. Lower marital satisfaction has been linked with flatter cortisol slopes across the day, lower waking levels of cortisol, and higher overall cortisol levels. However a meta-analysis found no relationship between marital quality and cortisol slopes.

==== Immune pathways ====
Low marital satisfaction, and hostility during arguments with one's spouse are associated with increased inflammation. Inflammation is part of a healthy response to injury and infection, however chronic and persistent inflammation damages the surrounding tissue. Chronic inflammation is implicated as a central mechanism linking psychosocial factors and diseases such as atherosclerosis and cancer. Beyond inflammation, lower marital quality is also related to poorer functioning of the adaptive immune system. Marital dissatisfaction and hostility during arguments with one's spouse are related to poorer ability to control the Epstein-Barr virus, a latent virus which infects most adults.

== See also ==
- Widowhood effect
