= Widowhood effect =

Increase in the probability of a person dying after their spouse has died

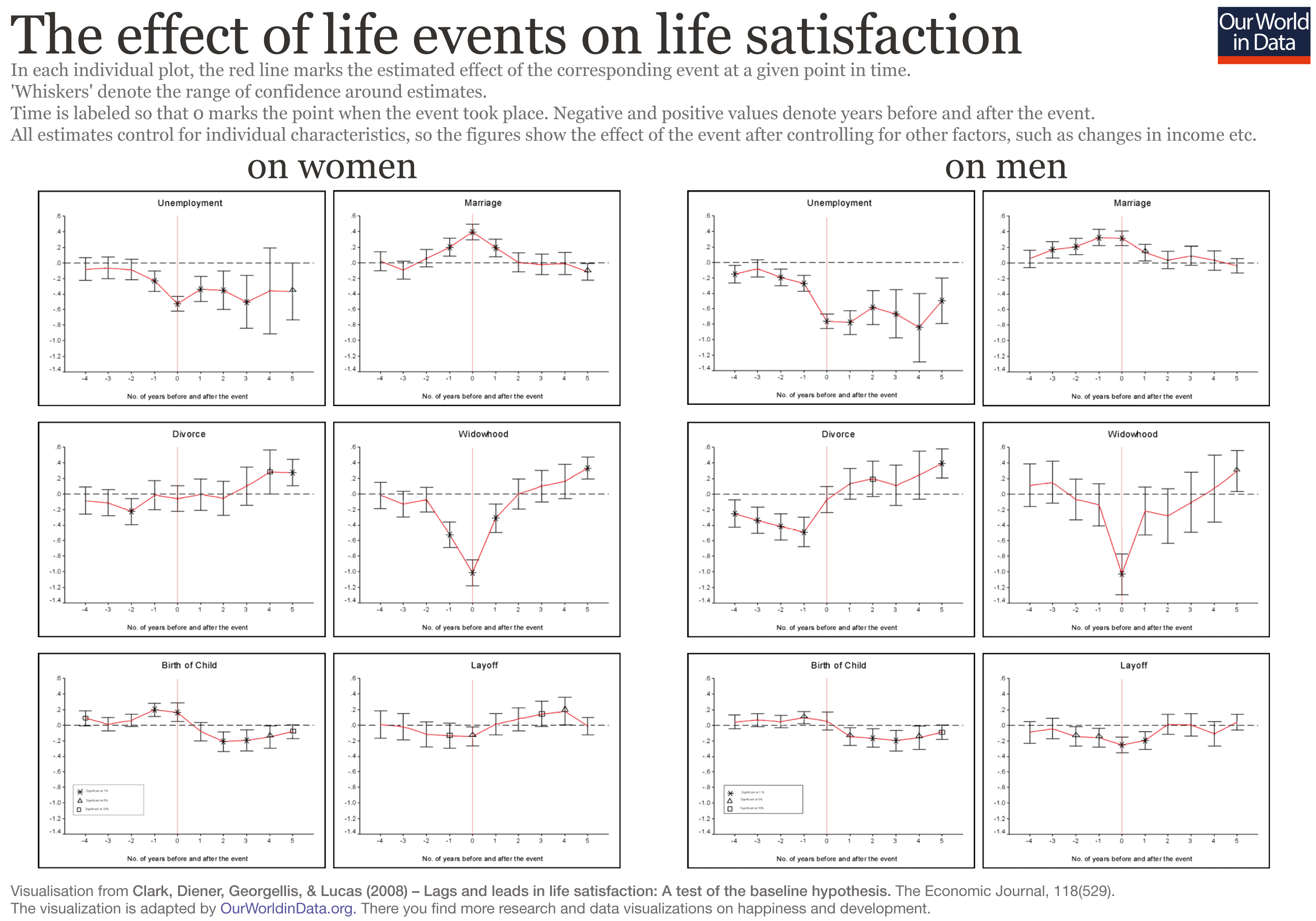
The effect of various life events on life satisfaction. Widowhood is one of the life events associated with the steepest decline in life satisfaction.

The widowhood effect is the increase in the probability of a person dying a relatively short time after a long-time spouse has died. It can also be referred to as "dying of a broken heart." Being widowed increases the likelihood of developing severe mental disorders along with psychological and physical illnesses.

== Health effects ==
=== Mental ===
The death of a spouse can have a major impact on one's mental health. Each individual may respond to their spouse's death differently. After the death of a spouse, many widows began to take more prescription medications for mental health issues. The mental health effects differ between men and women. Men may become more depressed in widowhood compared to women. Married men also report a higher rate of happiness in their marriage which could be drastically altered after the partners death. Men and women both show greater rates of depression after the death of a spouse but the rates of depression in men tend to be higher than in women.

A 2021 systematic review and meta-analysis by Singham, Bell, Saunders, and Stott reported that significant life stressors, such as the loss of a spouse, may be considered a risk factor in cognitive decline.

=== Dietary ===
Research has found that surviving spouses tended to experience significant weight loss after the death of their partner. It was theorized that these changes in weight are the result of differences in dietary intake before and after the death of a spouse. Danit Shahar and colleagues surveyed 116 older individuals in order to track their weight and eating habits over the course of their longitudinal study. Half of the participants were widowed, and the other half were non-widowed. The study found that the widowed subjects were more likely to eat meals alone than the married individuals. The diets of the widowed subjects also consisted of more commercial foods than their counterparts. The authors hypothesized that this weight loss was the result of the widowed participants not finding as much enjoyment in eating as they did before their spouse’s death. Widowed subjects had less of an appetite and as a result, lost weight over the course of the study.

=== Takotsubo ===
Takotsubo cardiomyopathy, also referred to as broken heart syndrome, has been discussed in contexts surrounding great physical and emotional stress, such as when someone has been widowed. In addition, emotional stress has long been associated with myocardial infarction. In their research, Brenn and Ytterstad reported an increase in the death of women 55–64 years old due to heart disease in the first week of widowhood than married women 55–64 years old (2016). Although takotsubo is not considered to be the direct cause of death at this time, it is an observed phenomenon.

== Effects on social life ==
Elderly widows usually experience changes in their social lives prior to and following the deaths of their spouses. A study conducted by Utz and colleagues revealed that elderly persons experiencing widowhood spent more time with family and friends than non-widowed counterparts, based on the lifestyle changes that occur in elderly couples. Although widowed subjects were more likely to socialize with family and friends, they were no more likely to visit church or volunteer than the intact couples. This study also found that healthy spouses were reclusive while their significant other was on their deathbed, but due to a network of family and friends; the surviving spouse entered society being more social than they had been prior to the death of their husband or wife. Elderly widows were more or less involved socially depending on the amount of support they had from family and friends. It has been noted that widows who have a close and supportive social network can counteract the effects of widowhood by remaining active in their social group. Losing a spouse can have a profound impact on a person's overall well-being, affecting various aspects of their life. This can include their psychological, social, physical, practical, and economic well-being. With all of these aspects of a widowed individual being affected maintaining a sense of normality is important to help avoid depression-like symptoms. Social support, as well as creating new lasting relationships through social interaction can help the process of bereavement go smoother for individuals who experience the widow effect.

== Possible causes ==
It has been suggested that the widowhood effect was a mere coincidence resulting from the selection of partners with similar health risks. In a recent study by Boyle and colleagues, it was concluded that the increased mortality rate of widows is caused by the death of their spouse. Researchers in the study used data from the Scottish Longitudinal Study to compare the ratios of death in widowed males and females. The male and female subjects were categorized into different groups depending on the manner in which their spouse died. The results provided evidence that suggests a causal relationship between mortality rate and widowhood.

In April 2016, the American Heart Association published an article regarding the phenomenon referred to as "broken heart syndrome". This particular syndrome seems to occur when a person experiences an overwhelming amount of stress in their life in a short period of time. The cases mentioned involved both positive events like winning the lottery as well as negative events like experiencing the death of a spouse. Though broken heart syndrome has been misdiagnosed as a heart attack, the differences between the two phenomena are clear. Heart attacks are the result of a blockage of arteries, but broken heart syndrome is the result of a hormone-induced enlargement of a portion of the heart. The enlarged region of the heart is less effective in regard to pumping blood, and the normal-sized regions of the heart are forced to work harder as a result.

== Urban, rural, and race variations ==
A 2015 study conducted by Wright and colleagues revealed that there is a significant difference in urban-rural variation in the social environment as well as in health outcomes. There is evidence that social support from family and friends has better health outcomes on mortality rates. Investigations showed that the race of the partner influences the widowhood effect; whites in endogamous marriages had greater mortality risks that were not obvious among blacks, which the authors concluded was due to a high level of family support for the elderly among black families versus white families. Moreover, the study also found differences in urban and rural areas around the world. They found that elderly married couples in the US suffered significant mortality risks compared to those in Ireland where older people living in more rural areas receive more social support from their families, and they live with their children, while in the US elderly people live in care homes. As a result, mortality rates are greater in urban areas and less in rural areas.

In a study done by Elwert and Christakis, they found that there was no widowhood effect found in endogamous marriages involving black men or women. Analyzing this finding, they proposed that this might be because black people are able to extend their marital survival advantage into widowhood. This is likely because black people are prone to have kin nearer to help take care of them, they may be more self-sufficient than their white counterparts, and there is greater religious participation in black people that may help them with spiritual comfort. White people were found to have "a large and enduring widowhood effect" because there is no reparation to make up for the survival advantages that marriage gave them, even if they have been widowed for years.

A large study in Northern Ireland found increases in mortality risk in the early widowhood period appeared to have a higher impact in rural and intermediate areas compared to urban areas. It is known that the size of family and social network coincides with physical functioning; the bigger the social group one belongs to the better they can physically function. Residential areas near green areas are associated with an increase in physical activity and lowered mortality. Researchers measured peak flow to show the increases or decrease in physical functioning, and the results suggest that married subjects have a higher peak flow compared to those divorced or widowed.

== Religious differences ==
A 2009 study by Abel and Kruger compared the likelihood of death between Catholic and Jewish widows, based on the graves of Jewish and Catholic couples in the Midwest. The data suggested that the widowhood effect was stronger in Jewish couples than in Catholic couples. One study proved that Catholic women lived 11 years after the death of their spouse, while Jewish women lived nine and a half years after the deaths of their husbands. Similarly, the Jewish men lived five years after the death of their wives, while the Catholic men lived about eight years after the death of their wives.

== See also ==
- Marriage and health
