= Valentine of Milan Mourning Her Husband the Duke of Orléans =

Painting by Fleury François Richard

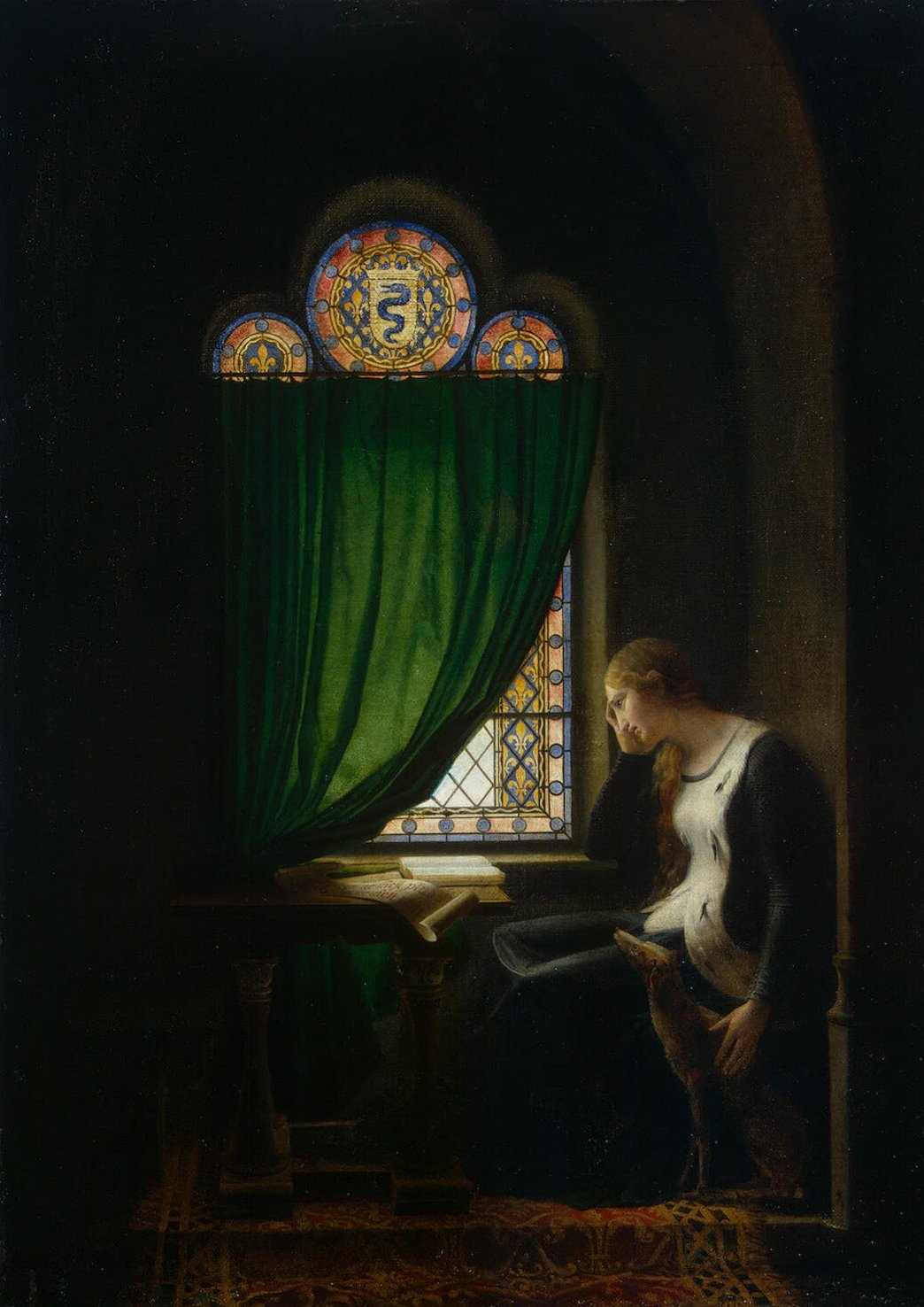
- Artist: Fleury François Richard
- Year: 1802
- Type: Oil on canvas, history painting
- Dimensions: 55 cm × 43 cm (22 in × 17 in)
- Location: Hermitage Museum; Saint Petersburg

Valentine of Milan Mourning Her Husband the Duke of Orléans is an 1802 history painting by the French artist Fleury François Richard. Presenting a scene from the Medieval era, it depicts Valentina Visconti, Duchess of Orléans mourning the death of her husband Duke of Orléans. He had been assassinated in 1407 during a power struggle at the French court.

It is considered to be one of the earliest examples of Troubadour style painting, a genre that flourished during the Romantic period of the early nineteenth century. The work was exhibited at the Salon of 1802 at the Louvre in Paris. Today it is in the collection of the Hermitage Museum in Saint Petersburg.

== Bibliography ==
- Palmer, Allison Lee. Historical Dictionary of Romantic Art and Architecture. Scarecrow Press, 2011.
- Smith, Anthony D. The Nation Made Real: Art and National Identity in Western Europe, 1600–1850. OUP Oxford, 2013.
