= Greatest Hits (2005 Blondie album) =

2005 album by Blondie

Greatest hits album by Blondie
- Released: November 8, 2005 (UK); March 6, 2006 (International)
- Recorded: 1976–2005
- Genres: New wave, punk rock, rock
- Label: EMI/Capitol Records
- Producers: Richard Gottehrer; Mike Chapman; Giorgio Moroder; Craig Leon; Super Buddha; Paolo Cilione; Claudio Camaione; Steve Thompson; Mark Vidler

Blondie chronology
Live by Request (2004)	Greatest Hits (2005)	Panic of Girls (2011)

Professional ratings
Review scores
Source	Rating
Allmusic	3.5/5 stars

Greatest Hits (not to be confused with the 2002 compilation of the same name) is a CD/DVD compilation album by the band Blondie released in the UK on November 8, 2005, and internationally on March 6, 2006. It peaked at number 48 on the UK Albums Chart and charted for 7 weeks. This was the first Blondie hits package to combine the CD and DVD formats.

== Overview ==
The CD contains the band's greatest hits including their comeback hit "Maria", a UK #1 in 1999, as well as tracks from their latest studio album The Curse of Blondie, a new remix of "In The Flesh" and a mashup of "Rapture" and The Doors' "Riders on the Storm" entitled "Rapture Riders", which was a top ten hit on the U.S. Hot Dance Club Play chart in 2005. The DVD includes videos of seventeen of the band's greatest hits.

The compilation was initially released under Greatest Hits title with a sticker Sight + Sound on the cover. It was later internationally released as Greatest Hits: Sound & Vision in early 2006. The new version omits "X Offender" and "(I'm Always Touched by Your) Presence, Dear" on both the CD and DVD, but adds the music video for "Rapture Riders" on the DVD.

The digital version of the album further omits "Maria" and "Rapture Riders".

== Track listing ==
CD
No.	Title	Writer(s)	Album	Length
1.	"Heart of Glass" (UK 7" Version)	Deborah Harry, Chris Stein	Parallel Lines	4:12
2.	"Sunday Girl"	Stein	Parallel Lines	3:15
3.	"Atomic"	Harry, Jimmy Destri	Eat to the Beat	4:39
4.	"Call Me"	Giorgio Moroder, Harry	American Gigolo (soundtrack)	3:32
5.	"The Tide Is High" (7" Edit)	John Holt, Tyrone Evans, Howard Barrett	Autoamerican	3:52
6.	"Rapture" (7" Edit)	Harry, Stein	Autoamerican	4:59
7.	"Maria"	Destri	No Exit	4:10
8.	"In the Flesh (Remix)"	Harry, Stein	Blondie	3:07
9.	"X Offender" (UK Only)	Harry, Gary Valentine	Blondie	3:14
10.	"Rip Her to Shreds"	Harry, Stein	Blondie	3:22
11.	"Denis"	Neil Levenson	Plastic Letters	2:19
12.	"(I'm Always Touched by Your) Presence, Dear" (UK Only)	Valentine	Plastic Letters	2:42
13.	"Picture This"	Harry, Stein, Destri	Parallel Lines	2:54
14.	"Fade Away and Radiate"	Stein	Parallel Lines	3:59
15.	"Hanging on the Telephone"	Jack Lee	Parallel Lines	2:22
16.	"One Way or Another"	Harry, Nigel Harrison	Parallel Lines	3:28
17.	"Dreaming"	Harry, Stein	Eat to the Beat	3:06
18.	"Union City Blue"	Harry, Harrison	Eat to the Beat	3:20
19.	"Island of Lost Souls"	Harry, Stein	The Hunter	4:41
20.	"Good Boys (Blow-Up Mix)"	Kevin Griffin, Harry	The Curse of Blondie	6:05
21.	"End to End"	Harry, Romy Ashby, Stein	The Curse of Blondie	4:01
22.	"Rapture Riders" (7" Edit)	Harry, Stein, The Doors		3:51

DVD
No.	Title	Writer(s)	Album	Length
1.	"In the Flesh"	Harry, Stein	Blondie
2.	"X Offender" (UK Only)	Harry, Valentine	Blondie
3.	"Denis"	Levenson	Plastic Letters
4.	"Detroit 442"	Destri, Stein	Plastic Letters
5.	"(I'm Always Touched by Your) Presence, Dear" (UK Only)	Valentine	Plastic Letters
6.	"Picture This"	Harry, Stein, Destri	Parallel Lines
7.	"Hanging on the Telephone"	Lee	Parallel Lines
8.	"Heart of Glass"	Harry, Stein	Parallel Lines
9.	"Dreaming"	Harry, Stein	Eat to the Beat
10.	"The Hardest Part"	Harry, Stein	Eat to the Beat
11.	"Union City Blue"	Harry, Harrison	Eat to the Beat
12.	"Atomic"	Harry, Destri	Eat to the Beat
13.	"The Tide Is High"	Holt, Evans, Barrett	Autoamerican
14.	"Rapture"	Harry, Stein	Autoamerican
15.	"Island of Lost Souls"	Harry, Stein	The Hunter
16.	"Maria"	Destri	No Exit
17.	"Good Boys"	Griffin, Harry	The Curse of Blondie
18.	"Rapture Riders" (International Version Only)	Harry, Stein, The Doors

== Production audio disc ==
- Mike Chapman - producer tracks 1–3, 5, 6 & 13–19
- Giorgio Moroder - producer track 4
- Craig Leon - producer track 7, co-producer track 21
- Super Buddha - remix producer track 8
- Richard Gottehrer - original producer track 8, producer tracks 9–12
- Paolo Cilione - producer track 20
- Claudio Camaione - producer track 20
- Steve Thompson - co-producer track 21
- Mark Vidler - producer track 22 for Go Home productions
