= Greatest Hits (Blondie album) =

Greatest hits album by Blondie
- Released: September 19, 2002
- Recorded: 1976–1998
- Genres: Pop, new wave
- Length: 67:53
- Label: Capitol
- Producers: Mike Chapman; Richard Gottehrer; Craig Leon

Blondie chronology
Live (1999)	Greatest Hits (2002)	The Curse of Blondie (2003)

Alternative cover
- UK edition

Professional ratings
Review scores
Source	Rating
Allmusic	4.5/5 stars
Rolling Stone	4/5 stars

Greatest Hits is a compilation album of recordings by the band Blondie released by EMI/Capitol Records in 2002.

== Overview ==
Following the re-issue of the six original studio albums in 2001, this was the first Blondie "Best of" compilation to be digitally remastered, the first Blondie "Best of" to be officially sanctioned by the band for over 20 years, and also the first to include their comeback hit "Maria", a UK #1 in February 1999.

Compiled by Capitol's Kevin Flaherty and London-based music journalist Steve Pafford, who also wrote the album sleeve notes, Greatest Hits features all of the tracks from the band's very first hits compilation, 1981's The Best of Blondie, including all four long-deleted 'special mixes' by producer Mike Chapman. Author Pafford was in the early stages of working with Debbie Harry on a lavish illustrated coffee table book entitled BlondieStyle (the sequel to his acclaimed BowieStyle, published by Omnibus Press), though as of 2010 the project is still on hold.

The album charted at #38 on the UK's Top 75 Album Chart and charted for 31 weeks. In New Zealand the album reached #15 and charted for 8 weeks.

As of August 9, 2005 it has sold 85,000 copies in United States.

The album was accompanied by a DVD release, Greatest Video Hits, which included the original 1981 Best of Blondie video album. However, the songs "Call Me" and "Sunday Girl" were not listed on the cover. The 2002 version added the videos for "The Hardest Part" (1979), "Island of Lost Souls" (1982) and the uncensored version of "Maria" (1999).

== Track listing ==
=== CD ===
No.	Title	Writer(s)	Album	Length
1.	"Dreaming"	Deborah Harry, Chris Stein	Eat to the Beat 1979	3:06
2.	"Call Me"	Giorgio Moroder, Harry	American Gigolo (soundtrack) 1980	3:32
3.	"One Way or Another"	Harry, Nigel Harrison	Parallel Lines 1978	3:33
4.	"Heart of Glass" (The Best of Blondie Special Mix)	Harry, Stein	Parallel Lines	4:33
5.	"The Tide Is High"	John Holt, Tyrone Evans, Howard Barrett	Autoamerican 1980	4:41
6.	"X Offender"	Harry, Gary Valentine	Blondie 1976	3:14
7.	"Hanging on the Telephone"	Jack Lee	Parallel Lines	2:21
8.	"Rip Her to Shreds"	Harry, Stein	Blondie	3:22
9.	"Rapture" (The Best of Blondie Special Edit)	Harry, Stein	Autoamerican	5:36
10.	"Atomic"	Harry, Jimmy Destri	Eat to the Beat	4:39
11.	"Picture This"	Harry, Stein, Destri	Parallel Lines	2:54
12.	"In the Flesh" (The Best of Blondie Special Mix)	Harry, Stein	Blondie	2:29
13.	"Denis"	Neil Levenson	Plastic Letters 1978	2:16
14.	"(I'm Always Touched by Your) Presence, Dear"	Valentine	Plastic Letters	2:42
15.	"Union City Blue"	Harry, Harrison	Eat to the Beat	3:18
16.	"The Hardest Part"	Harry, Stein	Eat to the Beat	3:37
17.	"Island of Lost Souls"	Harry, Stein	The Hunter 1982	4:41
18.	"Sunday Girl" (The Best of Blondie Special Mix)	Stein	Parallel Lines	3:03
19.	"Maria" (radio edit)	Destri	No Exit 1999	4:10

=== DVD ===
The Best of Blondie
No.	Title	Writer(s)	Album	Length
1.	"In the Flesh"	Harry, Stein	Blondie
2.	"X Offender"	Harry, Valentine	Blondie
3.	"Denis"	Levenson	Plastic Letters
4.	"Detroit 422"	Destri, Stein	Plastic Letters
5.	"(I'm Always Touched by Your) Presence, Dear"	Valentine	Plastic Letters
6.	"Picture This"	Harry, Stein, Destri	Parallel Lines
7.	"Hanging on the Telephone"	Lee	Parallel Lines
8.	"Heart of Glass"	Harry, Stein	Parallel Lines
9.	"Dreaming"	Harry, Stein	Eat to the Beat
10.	"Union City Blue"	Harry, Harrison	Eat to the Beat
11.	"Atomic"	Harry, Destri	Eat to the Beat
12.	"The Tide Is High"	Holt, Evans, Barrett	Autoamerican
13.	"Rapture"	Harry, Stein	Autoamerican
14.	"The Hardest Part"	Harry, Stein	Eat to the Beat
15.	"Island of Lost Souls"	Harry, Stein	The Hunter
16.	"Maria"	Destri	No Exit
17.	"Good Boys"	Harry, Griffin, May	Curse of Blondie

== Charts ==
=== CD ===
Chart (2002)	Peak position
Australian Albums (ARIA)	73
New Zealand Albums (RMNZ)	15
Spanish Albums (Promusicae)	81
Swedish Albums (Sverigetopplistan)	30
UK Albums (Official Charts)	38

=== DVD ===
Year	Country	Position
2017	Sweden	3

== Certifications ==
Certifications for Greatest Hits
Region	Certification	Certified units/sales
United Kingdom (BPI)	2× Platinum	600,000^{‡}
^{‡} Sales+streaming figures based on certification alone.
