= Atomic: The Very Best of Blondie =

Greatest hits album by Blondie
- Released: July 13, 1998
- Genre: New wave
- Length: 77:44 (Atomic); 58:02 (Atomix)
- Label: Chrysalis
- Producers: Mike Chapman; Richard Gottehrer; Giorgio Moroder

Blondie chronology
Picture This – The Essential Blondie Collection (1998)	Atomic: The Very Best of Blondie (1998)	No Exit (1999)

Alternative cover
- Cover art for the two-disc edition of the album, retitled Atomic/Atomix

Professional ratings
Review scores
Source	Rating
AllMusic	2.5/5 stars
Select	5/5 stars

Atomic: The Very Best of Blondie is a greatest hits album by American rock band Blondie, released on July 13, 1998, by Chrysalis Records, at the time when the band reunited and shortly before the beginning of their successful comeback tour.

== Overview ==
Atomic: The Very Best of Blondie includes the band's best known songs from the 1970s and 1980s, as well as two new remixes of the title track. The compilation reached number 12 on the UK Albums Chart and has been certified platinum by the British Phonographic Industry (BPI).

The compilation was reissued in June 1999 as a limited-edition two-CD set titled Atomic/Atomix: The Very Best of Blondie, including a second disc of previously available remixes with the exception of another new remix of the title track.

On October 31, 2011, the compilation was reissued again as a single disc with identical track listing, but with the title being changed to Essential, which was certified gold by the BPI on September 21, 2018.

== Track listing ==
Disc one – Atomic: The Very Best of Blondie
No.	Title	Writer(s)	Original album	Length
1.	"Atomic" (7″ Mix)	Jimmy Destri; Debbie Harry	Eat to the Beat (1979)	3:50
2.	"Heart of Glass" (7″ Mix)	Harry; Chris Stein	Parallel Lines (1978)	4:11
3.	"Sunday Girl"	Stein	Parallel Lines	3:15
4.	"Call Me"	Harry; Giorgio Moroder	American Gigolo soundtrack (1980)	3:32
5.	"The Tide Is High" (7″ Edit)	Harry; Stein	Autoamerican (1980)	3:52
6.	"Denis"	Neil Levenson	Plastic Letters (1978)	2:18
7.	"Dreaming"	Harry; Stein	Eat to the Beat	3:06
8.	"Rapture" (7″ Mix)	Harry; Stein	Autoamerican	4:59
9.	"Hanging on the Telephone"	Jack Lee	Parallel Lines	2:22
10.	"(I'm Always Touched by Your) Presence, Dear"	Gary Valentine	Plastic Letters	2:42
11.	"Island of Lost Souls" (7″ Edit)	Harry; Stein	The Hunter (1982)	3:50
12.	"Picture This"	Destri; Harry; Stein	Parallel Lines	2:57
13.	"Union City Blue"	Nigel Harrison; Harry	Eat to the Beat	3:22
14.	"War Child"	Harrison; Harry	The Hunter	4:00
15.	"Rip Her to Shreds"	Harry; Stein	Blondie (1976)	3:21
16.	"One Way or Another"	Harrison; Harry	Parallel Lines	3:28
17.	"X Offender"	Harry; Valentine	Blondie	3:10
18.	"I'm Gonna Love You Too"	Joe B. Mauldin; Norman Petty; Niki Sullivan	Parallel Lines	2:07
19.	"Fade Away and Radiate"	Stein	Parallel Lines	3:59
20.	"Atomic '98" (Xenomania Mix)	Destri; Harry		4:33
21.	"Atomic '98" (Tall Paul Mix)	Destri; Harry		8:43

Disc two – Atomix: The Very Best of Blondie Remixed
No.	Title	Writer(s)	Original album	Length
1.	"Atomic" (Diddy's 12″ Mix)	Destri; Harry	Beautiful: The Remix Album (1995)	6:51
2.	"Dreaming" (Utah Saints Mix))	Harry; Stein	Beautiful: The Remix Album	6:21
3.	"Denis" (Danny D Remix)	Levenson	Once More into the Bleach (1988)	5:23
4.	"Call Me" (Original 12″ Version)	Harry; Moroder	American Gigolo soundtrack	8:04
5.	"Heart of Glass" (Original 12″ Instrumental)	Harry; Stein	UK & US "Heart of Glass" 12″ single (1979)	5:14
6.	"Rapture" (US Disco Version)	Harry; Stein	US "Rapture" 12″ single (1981)	7:13
7.	"War Child" (12″ Version)	Harrison; Harry	UK "War Child" 12″ single (1982)	8:01
8.	"Atomic '98" (Dana Intellectual Mix)	Destri; Harry		6:35
9.	"Sunday Girl" (French Version) (Hidden track)	Stein		3:15

== Charts ==
=== Weekly charts ===
Weekly chart performance for Atomic: The Very Best of Blondie
Chart (1998–2001)	Peak position
Dutch Albums (Album Top 100)	48
European Albums (Music & Media)	51
New Zealand Albums (RMNZ)	18
UK Albums (Official Charts)	12

=== Year-end charts ===
Year-end chart performance for Atomic: The Very Best of Blondie
Chart (1999)	Position
UK Albums (OCC)	83

== Certifications ==
Certifications for Atomic: The Very Best of Blondie
Region	Certification	Certified units/sales
New Zealand (RMNZ)	Gold	7,500^{‡}
United Kingdom (BPI)	Platinum	300,000^{^}
United Kingdom (BPI) Reissue	Platinum	300,000^{‡}
^{^} Shipments figures based on certification alone.^{‡} Sales+streaming figures based on certification alone.
