= Live (Blondie album) =

Live album by Blondie
- Released: November 23, 1999
- Recorded: November 22, 1998 –August 14, 1999
- Genre: New wave
- Length: 75:51 (Live); 76:10 (Livid)
- Label: Beyond; Eagle
- Producer: Blondie; Randy Nicklaus

Blondie chronology
No Exit (1998)	Live (1999)	Greatest Hits (2002)

Alternative cover
- UK edition

Professional ratings
Review scores
Source	Rating
AllMusic	link
Entertainment Weekly	A− link
Robert Christgau	link
Spin	8/10 link

Live is the second live album by the band Blondie released in the US on November 23, 1999, and in the UK on April 25, 2000.

As of August 9, 2005, it has sold 129,000 copies in United States.

== Overview ==
The album was recorded during Blondie's successful 1998-99 comeback tour in support of their 1999 album, No Exit, and features all their best-known songs, including "Atomic", "The Tide Is High", "Call Me", and "Heart of Glass", as well as the 1999 UK #1 "Maria". The last track on the album is a manipulated live version of the song "One Way or Another" with the audience noise removed, which was used as a theme song for American dramedy TV series Snoops.

The UK edition of the album was renamed Livid and released on April 25, 2000. It featured the actual live version of "One Way or Another" instead of the Snoops theme version.

The album was also released on DVD twice, the first time in 1999 by Beyond Music and the second time in 2005 by EV Classics. The DVD edition captures the band filmed live on stage on February 23, 1999, at New York's Town Hall for their first hometown gig in 17 years, kicking off their 1999 US tour. The track listing of 2005 release is identical, but the running order is different.

== Track listing ==
CD
No.	Title	Writer(s)	Length
1.	"Dreaming" (recorded November 22, 1998 at Lyceum Ballroom, London)	Deborah Harry, Chris Stein	3:27
2.	"Hanging on the Telephone" (recorded November 22, 1998 at Lyceum Ballroom, London)	Jack Lee	2:23
3.	"Screaming Skin" (recorded March 10, 1999 at House of Blues, Las Vegas)	Harry, Stein, Romy Ashby, Leigh Foxx	5:32
4.	"Atomic" (recorded March 10, 1999 at House of Blues, Las Vegas)	Harry, Jimmy Destri	6:56
5.	"Forgive and Forget" (recorded February 23, 1999 at Town Hall, New York City)	Stein	4:35
6.	"The Tide Is High" (recorded June 25, 1999 at Glastonbury Festival)	John Holt, Tyrone Evans, Howard Barrett	4:04
7.	"Shayla" (recorded November 22, 1998 at Lyceum Ballroom, London)	Stein	5:08
8.	"Sunday Girl" (recorded November 22, 1998 at Lyceum Ballroom, London)	Stein	3:28
9.	"Maria" (recorded March 10, 1999 at House of Blues, Las Vegas)	Destri	4:49
10.	"Call Me" (recorded November 22, 1998 at Lyceum Ballroom, London)	Giorgio Moroder, Harry	4:46
11.	"Under the Gun" (recorded August 14, 1999 at Riviera Theater, Chicago)	Stein	4:54
12.	"Rapture" (recorded November 22, 1998 at Lyceum Ballroom, London)	Harry, Stein	6:24
13.	"Rip Her to Shreds" (recorded March 10, 1999 at House of Blues, Las Vegas)	Harry, Stein	3:20
14.	"X Offender" (recorded March 10, 1999 at House of Blues, Las Vegas)	Harry, Gary Valentine	3:24
15.	"No Exit" (recorded August 14, 1999 at Riviera Theater, Chicago)	Harry, Destri, Ashby, Stein, Coolio	4:08
16.	"Heart of Glass" (recorded August 14, 1999 at Riviera Theater, Chicago)	Harry, Stein	4:52
17.	"One Way or Another ('Snoops' Theme Song)" (recorded March 10, 1999 at House of Blues, Las Vegas)	Harry, Nigel Harrison	3:38

- Track 17 is replaced with the actual live version on the UK edition with length 4:10

DVD
No.	Title	Writer(s)	Length
1.	"Dreaming" (from Eat to the Beat, 1979)	Deborah Harry, Chris Stein
2.	"Maria" (from No Exit, 1999)	Jimmy Destri
3.	"Rip Her to Shreds" (from Blondie, 1977)	Harry, Stein
4.	"Hanging on the Telephone" (from Parallel Lines, 1978)	Jack Lee
5.	"Call Me" (from American Gigolo, 1980)	Giorgio Moroder, Harry
6.	"X Offender" (from Blondie, 1977)	Harry, Gary Valentine
7.	"Screaming Skin" (from No Exit, 1999)	Harry, Stein, Romy Ashby, Leigh Foxx
8.	"Boom Boom in the Zoom Zoom Room" (from No Exit, 1999)	Harry, Ashby, Clem Burke, Kathy Valentine, Denny Freeman
9.	"Atomic" (from Eat to the Beat, 1979)	Harry, Destri
10.	"Forgive and Forget" (from No Exit, 1999)	Stein
11.	"One Way or Another" (from Parallel Lines, 1978)	Harry, Nigel Harrison
12.	"Shayla / Union City Blue" (from Eat to the Beat, 1979)	Stein
13.	"In the Flesh" (from Blondie, 1977)	Harry, Stein
14.	"Heart of Glass" (from Parallel Lines, 1978)	Harry, Stein
15.	"Sunday Girl" (from Parallel Lines, 1978)	Stein
16.	"Rapture" (from Autoamerican, 1980)	Harry, Stein

Bonus video
No.	Title	Writer(s)	Length
17.	"Nothing Is Real but the Girl" (from No Exit, 1999)	Destri

== Personnel ==
Blondie

- Deborah Harry - vocals
- Chris Stein - guitar
- Jimmy Destri - keyboards
- Clem Burke - drums

Additional musicians

- Paul Carbonara - guitar
- Leigh Foxx - bass guitar
- Matt O'Connor - percussion

== Production ==
CD

- Tracks 1, 2, 7, 8, 10 and 12 recorded at Lyceum, London, November 22, 1998, by The BBC Live Music Mobile.
- Tracks 3, 4, 9, 13, 14 and 17 recorded at House Of Blues, Las Vegas, March 10, 1999. Mobile recording by Westwood One.
- Track 5 recorded at Town Hall, New York City, February 23, 1999. Recorded by All Mobile Video Truck.
- Track 6 recorded at 1999 Glastonbury Festival, June 25, 1999. Recorded by The BBC Live Music Mobile.
- Tracks 11, 15 and 16 recorded at Riviera Theater, Chicago, August 14, 1999. Recorded by Metro Music Recording, Glenview, IL.
