= The Best of Blondie =

Greatest hits album by Blondie
- Released: October 16, 1981
- Recorded: 1976–1980
- Genre: New wave
- Length: 43:37
- Label: Chrysalis
- Producers: Mike Chapman; Richard Gottehrer; Giorgio Moroder

Blondie chronology
Autoamerican (1980)	The Best of Blondie (1981)	The Hunter (1982)

Professional ratings
Review scores
Source	Rating
AllMusic	5/5 stars
Christgau's Record Guide	A−
The Rolling Stone Album Guide	4.5/5 stars
Smash Hits	9.5/10 stars

The Best of Blondie (released in Germany and the Netherlands as Blondie's Hits) is the first greatest hits album by American rock band Blondie. It was released in October 1981, by Chrysalis Records. The album peaked at number four in the United Kingdom and number 30 in the United States, while becoming the band's only number-one album in Australia.

== Background ==
The album was issued in several versions with different track inclusion and running order which varied slightly between North American and international editions of The Best of Blondie, highlighting the popularity of particular songs in different countries. The US and Canadian editions included "One Way or Another", which was not issued as a single in Europe. The international version of the album included three songs that were not on the North American release: "Denis", "Picture This" and "Union City Blue".

Blondie's producer Mike Chapman remixed three tracks specially for this album. The special mix of "Heart of Glass" is a version that combines elements from the original album version (also the 7″ single mix in the UK) and the instrumental version. The special mix of "In the Flesh" is a Phil Spector-esque mix, with much echo. The special mix of "Sunday Girl" mixes vocals from the previously released French-language version of the song with the original English version. Additionally, "Rapture" appears in an edited version of the 12″ Disco Mix released in the UK and Europe and includes an extra verse that did not appear on the album Autoamerican, on which the song was originally issued.

The album cover was shot in June 1978 by British photographer Martyn Goddard on a rooftop in Midtown Manhattan.

=== Video version ===
A video version of the album was released on VHS, featuring the band's music videos. The video was interspersed with footage of a New York City taxi driver who would see Blondie videos being played on television screens throughout the city. During the intro sequence the song "Call Me" is played, making it another music video. "Sunday Girl" (incomplete) is played during the end credits. The Best of Blondie video album was re-released on DVD in 2002 as a part of Greatest Video Hits to coincide with the release of the album Greatest Hits. The songs "Call Me" and "Sunday Girl" were omitted from the track listing, but not from the video itself. In addition to the entirety of The Best of Blondie, this DVD also includes three bonus tracks not on the original release: "The Hardest Part", "Island of Lost Souls", and "Maria".

== Track listing ==
All tracks are produced by Mike Chapman, except "In the Flesh", "(I'm Always Touched by Your) Presence, Dear", "Rip Her to Shreds" and "Denis", produced by Richard Gottehrer, and "Call Me", produced by Giorgio Moroder. All special mixes are produced by Chapman.

=== US and Canadian version ===
Side one
No.	Title	Writer(s)	Album	Length
1.	"Heart of Glass" (special mix)	Debbie Harry; Chris Stein	Parallel Lines	4:33
2.	"Dreaming"	Harry; Stein	Eat to the Beat	3:06
3.	"The Tide Is High"	John Holt	Autoamerican	4:41
4.	"In the Flesh" (special mix)	Harry; Stein	Blondie	2:29
5.	"Sunday Girl" ((French version) (special mix))	Stein	Parallel Lines	3:03
6.	"Hanging on the Telephone"	Jack Lee	Parallel Lines	2:21

Side two
No.	Title	Writer(s)	Album	Length
7.	"Rapture"	Stein; Harry	Autoamerican	5:36
8.	"One Way or Another"	Harry; Nigel Harrison	Parallel Lines	3:33
9.	"(I'm Always Touched by Your) Presence, Dear"	Gary Valentine	Plastic Letters	2:42
10.	"Call Me"	Moroder; Harry	American Gigolo	3:32
11.	"Atomic"	Harry; Jimmy Destri	Eat to the Beat	4:39
12.	"Rip Her to Shreds"	Harry; Stein	Blondie	3:22
Total length:				43:37

=== International version ===
Side one
No.	Title	Writer(s)	Album	Length
1.	"Heart of Glass" (special mix)	Harry; Stein	Parallel Lines	4:33
2.	"Denis"	Neil Levenson	Plastic Letters	2:18
3.	"The Tide Is High"	Holt	Autoamerican	4:41
4.	"In the Flesh" (special mix)	Harry; Stein	Blondie	2:29
5.	"Sunday Girl" (special mix)	Stein	Parallel Lines	3:03
6.	"Dreaming"	Harry; Stein	Eat to the Beat	3:06
7.	"Hanging on the Telephone"	Lee	Parallel Lines	2:21

Side two
No.	Title	Writer(s)	Album	Length
8.	"Rapture"	Stein; Harry	Autoamerican	5:36
9.	"Picture This"	Harry; Stein; Destri	Parallel Lines	2:55
10.	"Union City Blue"	Harry; Harrison	Eat to the Beat	3:21
11.	"(I'm Always Touched by Your) Presence, Dear"	Valentine	Plastic Letters	2:42
12.	"Call Me"	Moroder; Harry	American Gigolo	3:31
13.	"Atomic"	Harry; Destri	Eat to the Beat	4:39
14.	"Rip Her to Shreds"	Harry; Stein	Blondie	3:22
Total length:				48:37

=== Video version ===
No.	Title	Writer(s)	Album	Length
1.	"Call Me"	Moroder; Harry	American Gigolo	3:42
2.	"In the Flesh"	Harry; Stein	Blondie	2:27
3.	"X Offender"	Harry; Valentine	Blondie	4:31
4.	"Denis"	Levenson	Plastic Letters	2:10
5.	"Detroit 442"	Destri; Stein	Plastic Letters	9:34
6.	"(I'm Always Touched by Your) Presence, Dear"	Valentine	Plastic Letters	2:46
7.	"Picture This"	Harry; Stein; Destri	Parallel Lines	3:04
8.	"Hanging on the Telephone"	Lee	Parallel Lines	4:31
9.	"Heart of Glass"	Harry; Stein	Parallel Lines	4:31
10.	"Dreaming"	Harry; Stein	Eat to the Beat	2:58
11.	"Union City Blue"	Harry; Harrison	Eat to the Beat	4:39
12.	"Atomic"	Harry; Destri	Eat to the Beat	4:03
13.	"The Tide Is High"	Holt	Autoamerican	3:56
14.	"Rapture"	Stein; Harry	Autoamerican	4:55
15.	"Sunday Girl"	Stein	Parallel Lines	3:21

== Personnel ==
Credits adapted from the liner notes of the US and Canadian edition of The Best of Blondie.

=== Blondie ===
- Clem Burke – drums
- Jimmy Destri – keyboards
- Nigel Harrison – bass
- Debbie Harry – vocals
- Frank Infante – guitar
- Chris Stein – guitar

=== Technical ===
- Mike Chapman – production (tracks 1–3, 5–8, 11); special mix production (tracks 1, 4, 5)
- Richard Gottehrer – production (tracks 4, 9, 12)
- Giorgio Moroder – production (track 10)

=== Artwork ===
- Peter Wagg – art direction
- Martyn Goddard – front cover photography
- Brian Cooke – back cover photography

== Charts ==
=== Weekly charts ===
Chart (1981–1982)	Peak position
Australian Albums (Kent Music Report)	1
Canada Top Albums/CDs (RPM)	15
Dutch Albums (Album Top 100)	46
New Zealand Albums (RMNZ)	1
UK Albums (Official Charts)	4
US Billboard 200	30

=== Year-end charts ===
Chart (1981)	Position
Canada Top Albums/CDs (RPM)	81
UK Albums (OCC)	18

Chart (1982)	Position
Australian Albums (Kent Music Report)	14
New Zealand Albums (RMNZ)	34

== Certifications and sales ==
Region	Certification	Certified units/sales
Australia	—	200,000
Hong Kong (IFPI Hong Kong)	Gold	10,000^{*}
New Zealand (RMNZ)	Platinum	15,000^{^}
United Kingdom (BPI)	2× Platinum	600,000^{^}
United States (RIAA)	2× Platinum	2,000,000^{^}
^{*} Sales figures based on certification alone.^{^} Shipments figures based on certification alone.
