= Picture This – The Essential Blondie Collection =

Picture This - The Essential Blondie Collection

Compilation album by Blondie
- Released: April 6, 1998
- Recorded: Compilation
- Genre: New wave
- Length: 57:10
- Label: EMI

Blondie chronology
Picture This Live (1997)	Picture This - The Essential Blondie Collection (1998)	Atomic: The Very Best of Blondie (1998)

Picture This – The Essential Blondie Collection is a compilation album of recordings by the band Blondie released by EMI in 1998. It contains a selection of album tracks, singles, one b-side, one demo and two remixes taken from 1995 remix compilation Beautiful: The Remix Album. Track listing of this compilation is almost the same as the previous Blondie compilation Denis.

== Track listing ==
No.	Title	Writer(s)	Album	Length
1.	"Hanging on the Telephone"	Jack Lee	Parallel Lines	2:23
2.	"The Tide Is High"	John Holt / Howard Barrett / Tyrone Evans	Autoamerican	3:51
3.	"Picture This"	Harry / Stein / Jimmy Destri	Parallel Lines	2:55
4.	"In the Flesh"	Harry / Stein	Blondie	2:30
5.	"X Offender"	Harry / Gary Valentine	Blondie	3:12
6.	"Denis"	Neil Levenson	Plastic Letters	2:17
7.	"Island of Lost Souls"	Stein / Harry	The Hunter	3:50
8.	"For Your Eyes Only"	Stein / Harry	The Hunter	3:07
9.	"Rifle Range"	Stein / Ronnie Toast	Blondie	3:40
10.	"Susie and Jeffrey"	Harry / Nigel Harrison	B-side to "The Tide Is High" single	4:08
11.	"War Child"	Harrison / Harry	The Hunter	4:01
12.	"Platinum Blonde"	Harry	The Platinum Collection	2:18
13.	"Die Young Stay Pretty"	Harry / Stein	Eat to the Beat	3:33
14.	"Atomic" (Diddy's 12" Mix)	Destri	Beautiful: The Remix Album	6:51
15.	"Union City Blue" (Diddy's Power & Passion Mix)	Harry / Harrison	Beautiful: The Remix Album	8:34
