= Picture This Live =

Live album by Blondie
- Released: October 7, 1997
- Recorded: Walnut Street Theatre, Philadelphia, November 6, 1978; McFarlin Memorial Auditorium, Dallas, August 5, 1979
- Genre: New wave
- Length: 75:12
- Label: Chrysalis
- Producer: Cheryl Pawelski

Blondie chronology
Denis (1996)	Picture This Live (1997)	Picture This – The Essential Blondie Collection (1998)

Alternative cover
- 1999 re-issue

Professional ratings
Review scores
Source	Rating
Allmusic	link
Robert Christgau	A− link
Encyclopedia of Popular Music	2/5 stars

Picture This Live is the first live album by the band Blondie released by EMI subsidiary Chrysalis Records as a limited edition full-price album in 1997 in the United States. It was later released in the United Kingdom and Europe as a mid-price release with alternate artwork under the title Blondie Live: Philadelphia 1978 / Dallas 1980 in 1999.

As of August 9, 2005, it has sold 22,000 copies in United States.

== Overview ==
Picture This Live was released as part of a series of limited edition albums celebrating EMI's 100th anniversary in 1997. The album contains two performances originally recorded for the King Biscuit Flower Hour radio show.

The song "A Shark in Jets Clothing" which is joined with "I Know but I Don't Know" on track 11 is omitted from the track listing of all editions of the album.

Live versions of "I Know but I Don't Know" and "Hanging on the Telephone" from this album were later added as bonus tracks to the 2001 remastered edition of Blondie's 1978 album Parallel Lines. The song "Detroit 442" from the Philadelphia performance is not present on this album, however it was issued as a bonus track on the 2001 remastered edition of Blondie's other 1978 album, Plastic Letters.

== Track listing ==
No.	Title	Writer(s)	Length
1.	"Dreaming" (from Eat to the Beat, 1979)	Deborah Harry, Chris Stein	4:07
2.	"In the Sun" (from Blondie, 1977)	Stein	2:47
3.	"Hanging on the Telephone" (from Parallel Lines, 1978)	Jack Lee	2:18
4.	"Look Good in Blue" (from Blondie)	Jimmy Destri	3:38
5.	"Slow Motion" (from Eat to the Beat)	Laura Davis, Destri	3:22
6.	"Sunday Girl" (from Parallel Lines)	Stein	3:38
7.	"X Offender" (from Blondie)	Harry, Gary Valentine	2:59
8.	"Picture This" (from Parallel Lines)	Harry, Stein, Destri	2:54
9.	"Denis" (from Plastic Letters, 1978)	Neil Levenson	3:10
10.	"Fade Away and Radiate" (from Parallel Lines)	Stein	5:06
11.	"A Shark in Jets Clothing" / "I Know but I Don't Know" (from Blondie / from Parallel Lines)	Destri / Frank Infante	8:25
12.	"One Way or Another" (from Parallel Lines)	Harry, Nigel Harrison	6:47
13.	"Heart of Glass" (from Parallel Lines)	Harry, Stein	6:21
14.	"11:59" (from Parallel Lines)	Destri	4:14
15.	"Bang a Gong (Get It On)" / "Funtime" (T. Rex cover / Iggy Pop cover)	Marc Bolan / Iggy Pop, David Bowie	15:26

- Tracks 1–6 and 13–15 recorded live August 5, 1979, in Dallas (incorrectly listed on the album as 1980, the original radio broadcast date)
- Tracks 7–12 recorded live November 6, 1978, at the Walnut Street Theatre in Philadelphia

== Personnel ==
=== Blondie ===
- Deborah Harry – vocals
- Chris Stein – guitar
- Clem Burke – drums
- Jimmy Destri – keyboards
- Nigel Harrison – bass guitar
- Frank Infante – guitar

=== Additional Personnel ===
- Cheryl Pawelski – Compilation Producer, Producer
- Bernadette Fauver – Producer
- Kevin Flaherty – Associate Producer, Liner Notes
- Marc Rashba – Executive Producer
- Lisa Reddick – Producer
- Adam Varon – Producer
- Ann King Speer – Production Coordination
- Johnny Lee – Art Direction
- Ricky Mintz – Art Direction
- John O'Brien – Design
