= Denis (album) =

Compilation album by Blondie
- Released: November 11, 1996
- Recorded: Compilation
- Genre: New wave
- Length: 44:54
- Label: Disky Communications (Netherlands); EMI (UK & Europe)

Blondie chronology
Remixed Remade Remodeled: The Remix Project (1995)	Denis (1996)	Picture This Live (1997)

Alternative cover
- The cover of 1997 UK edition

Professional ratings
Review scores
Source	Rating
Allmusic	2/5 stars

Denis is a midprice compilation album of recordings by the band Blondie first released by Disky Records in the Netherlands in 1996. It includes a number of singles, album tracks, b-sides and a demo of "Platinum Blonde" which previously appeared on the 1994 compilation album The Platinum Collection.

The compilation has since been re-released in UK and Europe by EMI under the title The Essential Collection in 1997 and then again in 1999.

The compilation is notable for including at least one song from every Blondie album at that point, but omitting the band's biggest hits such as "Heart of Glass", "Call Me", and "Rapture".

== Track listing ==
No.	Title	Writer(s)	Album	Length
1.	"Denis"	Neil Levenson	Plastic Letters	2:17
2.	"The Tide Is High"	John Holt / Howard Barrett / Tyrone Evans	Autoamerican	3:50
3.	"Hanging on the Telephone"	Jack Lee	Parallel Lines	2:21
4.	"Rip Her to Shreds"	Debbie Harry / Chris Stein	Blondie	3:19
5.	"Picture This"	Harry / Stein / Jimmy Destri	Parallel Lines	2:55
6.	"X Offender"	Harry / Gary Valentine	Blondie	3:11
7.	"Rifle Range"	Stein / Ronnie Toast	Blondie	3:39
8.	"For Your Eyes Only"	Stein / Harry	The Hunter	3:06
9.	"Susie and Jeffrey"	Harry / Nigel Harrison	B-side to "The Tide Is High" single	4:07
10.	"Die Young Stay Pretty"	Harry / Stein	Eat to the Beat	3:31
11.	"Island of Lost Souls"	Stein / Harry	The Hunter	3:48
12.	"Platinum Blonde"	Harry	The Platinum Collection	2:17
13.	"War Child"	Harrison / Harry	The Hunter	3:59
14.	"In the Flesh"	Harry / Stein	Blondie	2:30
