= Blonde and Beyond =

Compilation album by Blondie
- Released: November 16, 1993
- Recorded: Compilation
- Genre: New wave
- Length: 70:02
- Label: EMI/Chrysalis

Blondie chronology
The Complete Picture: The Very Best of Deborah Harry and Blondie (1991)	Blonde and Beyond (1993)	The Platinum Collection (1994)

Professional ratings
Review scores
Source	Rating
AllMusic	3/5 stars
Calgary Herald	B+
Music Week	3/5 stars
NME	8/10
Select	4/5 medals

Blonde and Beyond is a compilation album of recordings by Blondie released on Chrysalis Records in 1993.

As of August 9, 2005 it has sold 43,000 copies in United States.

== Overview ==
Blonde and Beyond is a compilation that gathers some of the band's hit singles like "Heart of Glass", "Denis", "X Offender", "Picture This" and "Island Of Lost Souls" along with album tracks, single b-sides and previously unreleased recordings, which include three demos ("Underground Girl", "Scenery" and "Once I Had A Love") and a live cover of T. Rex's "Bang a Gong (Get It On)".

Most of the single b-sides and previously unreleased songs included on Blonde and Beyond have since been recycled as bonus tracks on 2001 reissues of the band's studio albums or other EMI compilations.

== Track listing ==
1. "Underground Girl" (Frank Infante) - 3:54
  - Demo from Parallel Lines sessions, 1978
2. "English Boys" (Debbie Harry, Chris Stein) - 3:48
  - From the album The Hunter, 1982
3. "Sunday Girl" (French Version) (Stein) - 3:02
  - From the UK 12" single "Sunday Girl", 1978
4. "Susie And Jeffrey" (Harry, Nigel Harrison) - 4:08
  - B-side of "The Tide Is High" single, 1980
5. "Shayla" (Stein) - 3:56
  - From the album Eat to the Beat, 1979
6. "Denis" (Neil Levenson) - 2:17
  - From the album Plastic Letters, 1978
7. "X Offender" (Harry, Gary Valentine) - 3:11
  - From the album Blondie, 1977
8. "Poets Problem" (Jimmy Destri) - 2:19
  - B-side to "(I'm Always Touched By Your) Presence, Dear" single, 1978
9. "Scenery" (Valentine) - 3:08
  - Demo from Blondie sessions, 1976
10. "Picture This" (Harry, Stein, Destri) - 2:55
  - From the album Parallel Lines, 1978
11. "Angels on the Balcony" (Laura Davis, Destri) - 3:37
  - From the album Autoamerican, 1980
12. "Once I Had a Love" (Harry, Stein) - 3:11
  - The early version of "Heart of Glass", 1976.
13. "I'm Gonna Love You Too" (Joe B. Mauldin, Niki Sullivan, Norman Petty) - 2:08
  - From the album Parallel Lines, 1978
14. "Island of Lost Souls" (Stein, Harry) - 3:49
  - Original version appears on album The Hunter, 1982
15. "Call Me" (Spanish Version) (Giorgio Moroder, Harry) - 3:31
  - From the 12" single "Call Me", 1980
16. "Heart of Glass" (Disco Version) (Harry, Stein) - 5:48
  - Original version appears on the album Parallel Lines, 1978
17. "Ring of Fire" (Live) (June Carter, Merle Kilgore) - 3:30
  - From the soundtrack album "Roadie", 1980
18. "Bang a Gong (Get It On)" (Live) (Marc Bolan) - 5:22
  - Recorded live at The Paradise Club, Boston on November 4, 1978.
19. "Heroes" (Live) (David Bowie, Brian Eno) - 6:28
  - Recorded live at The Hammersmith Odeon on January 12, 1980. From the UK 12" single "Atomic", 1980
- Tracks 1, 9, 12, 18 were previously unreleased

== Personnel ==
Blondie

- Deborah Harry – vocals
- Chris Stein – guitar
- Clem Burke – drums
- Jimmy Destri – keyboards
- Nigel Harrison – bass guitar
- Frank Infante – guitar

Additional musicians

- Robert Fripp - guitar (track 19)

Production

- Bruce Harris - executive producer
- Dan Loggins - compilation producer, audio mixer (track 12)
- Larry Walsh - mastering, audio mixer (track 12)
- Vincent M. Vero - project coordinator, discography research
- Ira Robbins - liner notes
- Henry Marquez - artwork/art direction
- Susan Bibeau - artwork/design
- Blondie - producers (tracks 17, 18)
- Mike Chapman - producer (tracks 1 to 5, 10, 11, 13, 14, 16)
- Richard Gottehrer - producer (tracks 6 to 9)
- Giorgio Moroder - producer (track 15)
- Chris Stein - producer (track 19)
- Jimmy Destri - producer (track 19)
- Paddy Maloney - producer (track 19)
- The producer of track 12 is unknown
