= The Platinum Collection (Blondie album) =

Compilation album by Blondie
- Released: November 1, 1994
- Recorded: 1975–1982, 1994
- Genre: New wave
- Length: 154:04
- Label: EMI, Chrysalis

Blondie chronology
Blonde and Beyond (1993)	The Platinum Collection (1994)	Beautiful - The Remix Album (1995)

Alternative cover
- UK edition

Professional ratings
Review scores
Source	Rating
AllMusic	4.5/5 stars
Music Week	4/5 stars

The Platinum Collection is a two disc compilation album of recordings by Blondie released by EMI/Chrysalis in 1994. The forty-seven track compilation contains the A- and B-sides of all singles issued by the band in the US and the UK between the years 1976 and 1982 in chronological order, five demo recordings made before the release of their debut album including an alternative version of "Heart of Glass", as well as two 1994 dance remixes of their hits "Atomic" and "Rapture".

The liner notes contain extensive interviews with band members Clem Burke, Jimmy Destri, Nigel Harrison, Frank Infante and Gary Valentine.

As of August 9, 2005, it had sold 53,000 copies in United States.

== Track listing ==
Disc one:

1. "X Offender" (Original LP Version) (Harry, Valentine) – 3:10
2. "In The Flesh" (Harry, Stein) – 2:26
3. "Man Overboard" (Harry) – 3:20
4. "Rip Her to Shreds" (Harry, Stein) – 3:18
5. "Denis" (Levenson) – 2:16
6. "Contact in Red Square" (Destri) – 1:56
7. "Kung Fu Girls" (Destri, Harry, Valentine) – 2:29
8. "I'm on E" (Harry, Stein) – 2:12
9. "(I'm Always Touched by Your) Presence, Dear" (Valentine) – 2:40
10. "Poets Problem" (Non-Album B-Side of 'I'm Always Touched By Your, Presence Dear') (Destri) – 2:19
11. "Detroit 442" (Destri, Stein) – 2:24
12. "Picture This" (Destri, Harry, Stein) – 2:53
13. "Fade Away (and Radiate)" (Stein) – 3:57
14. "I'm Gonna Love You Too" (Mauldin, Petty, Sullivan) – 2:03
15. "Just Go Away" (Harry) – 3:21
16. "Hanging on the Telephone" (Lee) – 2:17
17. "Will Anything Happen" (Lee) – 2:55
18. "Heart of Glass" (Disco Version - UK 7" Edit) (Harry, Stein) – 4:10
19. "Rifle Range" (Stein, Toast) – 3:37
20. "11:59" (Destri) – 3:19
21. "Sunday Girl" (7" Single Mix) (Stein) – 3:12
22. "I Know But I Don't Know" (Infante) – 3:53
23. "One Way or Another" (7" Version) (Harrison, Harry) – 3:31
24. "Dreaming" (Harry, Stein) – 3:03
25. "Sound-A-Sleep" (Harry, Stein) – 4:12
26. "Living in the Real World" (Destri) – 2:38

Disc two:

1. "Union City Blue" (Harrison, Harry) – 3:18
2. "The Hardest Part" (Harry, Stein) – 3:37
3. "Atomic" (7" Mix) (Destri, Harry) – 3:50
4. "Die Young Stay Pretty" (Harry, Stein) – 3:27
5. "Slow Motion" (Aborted Single Issue) (Davis, Destri) – 3:25
6. "Call Me" (7" Mix) (Harry, Moroder) – 3:30
7. "The Tide Is High" (7" Edit) (Barrett, Evans, Holt) – 3:51
8. "Susie and Jeffrey" (Non-Album B-Side from 'The Tide Is High') (Harrison, Harry) – 4:08
9. "Rapture" (UK 7" Edit) (Harry, Stein) – 4:57
10. "Walk Like Me" (Destri) – 3:46
11. "Island of Lost Souls" (7" Edit) (Harry, Stein) – 3:48
12. "Dragonfly" (Harry, Stein) – 5:58
13. "War Child" (Harrison, Harry) – 3:58
14. "Little Caesar" (Harry, Stein) – 2:57
15. "Out in the Streets" (1975 demo recording) (Barry, Greenwich) – 2:19
16. "Platinum Blonde" (1975 demo recording) (Harry) – 2:15
17. "The Thin Line" (1975 demo recording) (Harry, Stein) – 2:25
18. "Puerto Rico" (1975 demo recording) (Harry, Stein) – 2:05
19. "Once I Had a Love" (a.k.a. "The Disco Song", 1975 demo recording, early version of "Heart of Glass") (Harry, Stein) – 3:56
20. "Atomic" (Diddy Remix – Radio Edit) (Destri, Harry) – 4:03
21. "Rapture" (K-Klass Remix – Radio Edit) (Harry, Stein) – 4:20

== Production ==
- Producer – Alan Betrock (tracks: 2.15 to 2.19)
- Producer – Mike Chapman (tracks: 1.12 to 1.18, 1.20 to 1.26, 2.01 to 2.05, 2.07 to 2.14, 2.20, 2.21)
- Producer – Richard Gottehrer (tracks: 1.01 to 1.11, 1.19)
- Producer - Giorgio Moroder (track: 2.06)

== Certifications ==
Region	Certification	Certified units/sales
United Kingdom (BPI)	Gold	100,000^{‡}
^{‡} Sales+streaming figures based on certification alone.
