= No Exit (Blondie album) =

1999 studio album by Blondie

Studio album by Blondie
- Released: February 15, 1999
- Recorded: 1998
- Studios: Red Night Recording, Electric Lady and Chung King House of Metal (New York City)
- Genre: Alternative rock
- Length: 59:05
- Label: Beyond Music
- Producer: Craig Leon

Blondie chronology
Atomic: The Very Best of Blondie (1998)	No Exit (1999)	Live (1999)

Singles from No Exit
- 1. "Maria" Released: February 1, 1999 (UK); 2. "Nothing Is Real but the Girl" Released: May 31, 1999; 3. "No Exit" Released: October 22, 1999

Professional ratings
Review scores
Source	Rating
AllMusic	2.5/5 stars
The Encyclopedia of Popular Music	3/5 stars
Entertainment Weekly	C
Robert Christgau	A−
Rolling Stone	2.5/5 stars
The Rolling Stone Album Guide	3/5 stars

No Exit is the seventh studio album by American rock band Blondie, released on February 15, 1999, by Beyond Music. It was the band's first album in 17 years and features the UK number-one single "Maria". As of March 2006, the album had sold two million copies worldwide.

== Overview ==
As was customary for a Blondie album, No Exit dabbled in many genres, including pop, ska, country, jazz, and hip-hop. Mike Chapman, who had produced all but the first two of Blondie's previous albums, produced some of the early demos for the album, though final production of the album fell to Craig Leon.

A cover of the Shangri-Las' 1965 song "Out in the Streets" is included on the album. Blondie first recorded a version of the song in 1975 while they were trying to get a record deal. The 1975 demo version was first issued on EMI's 1994 anthology The Platinum Collection and was later included on the 2001 remastered version of the band's eponymous debut studio album.

The song "Under the Gun" is a tribute to musician Jeffrey Lee Pierce of The Gun Club, a longtime friend of the band who died in 1996.

A comeback promotional tour, the No Exit Tour, was launched preceding the release of the album, which spanned 13 months and visited Europe, North America and Oceania.

== Release and reception ==
No Exit reached number three on the UK Albums Chart, and was certified gold by the British Phonographic Industry (BPI) for sales in excess of 100,000 copies. It was preceded by the single "Maria", which became Blondie's sixth UK number one, exactly 20 years after the band's first number one, "Heart of Glass", making them the first American band to have chart-topping UK singles in three different decades: 1970s, 1980s, and 1990s. A second single, "Nothing Is Real but the Girl", peaked at number 26 on the UK Singles Chart. The title track, "No Exit", was released as a limited-edition third single in Europe, and is a fusion of classical, hip-hop and rock, and featuring raps by Mobb Deep, Coolio, U-God, and Inspectah Deck. "Screaming Skin" was released as a promo single in the US in late 1999.

The album was released in several editions in different countries with various bonus tracks, mainly live versions of songs recorded during the band's No Exit Tour. It was also reissued in 2001 along with all of Blondie's other studio albums.

Chris Stein commented on the title of the album in a 2004 interview: "The title was taken from a Sartre play, which says there's no madness in individuals, it's all in groups. I think that's probably what all these reality TV shows are about. Maybe we were a reality TV show before there was reality TV."

The album was not available on streaming platforms or digital music stores for several years, most likely because of a possible dispute in licensing or distribution rights, although the song "Maria" from the album could still be found on these platforms and stores on compilation albums. No Exit and its follower The Curse of Blondie (2003) were added to all streaming platforms on November 16, 2023.

== Track listing ==
No.	Title	Lyrics	Music	Length
1.	"Screaming Skin"	Deborah Harry; Romy Ashby	Chris Stein; Leigh Foxx	5:37
2.	"Forgive and Forget (Pull Down the Night)"	Stein	Stein	4:31
3.	"Maria"	Jimmy Destri	Destri	4:51
4.	"No Exit"	Destri; Harry; Ashby; Coolio	Destri; Stein	4:19
5.	"Double Take" (featuring Candy Dulfer)	Harry	Stein	4:12
6.	"Nothing Is Real but the Girl"	Destri	Destri	3:13
7.	"Boom Boom in the Zoom Zoom Room"	Harry; Ashby	Clem Burke; Kathy Valentine; Denny Freeman	4:08
8.	"Night Wind Sent"	Harry; Ashby	Foxx; Stein	4:40
9.	"Under the Gun" (for Jeffrey Lee Pierce)	Stein	Stein	4:09
10.	"Out in the Streets"	Ellie Greenwich; Jeff Barry	Greenwich; Barry	3:03
11.	"Happy Dog" (for Caggy)	Harry; Ashby	Stein	3:24
12.	"The Dream's Lost on Me"	Ashby	Stein; Harry	3:19
13.	"Divine"	Burke; Valentine	Burke; Valentine	4:14
14.	"Dig Up the Conjo"	Destri	Stein; Harry; Destri	4:55

US and Canadian edition bonus tracks
No.	Title	Writer(s)	Length
15.	"Dreaming" (live at Lyceum Ballroom, London, November 22, 1998) (hidden track)	Harry; Stein	3:22
16.	"Call Me" (live at Lyceum Ballroom, London, November 22, 1998) (hidden track)	Giorgio Moroder; Harry	4:47
17.	"Rapture" (live at Lyceum Ballroom, London, November 22, 1998) (hidden track)	Stein; Harry	7:07

Australian edition bonus tracks
No.	Title	Writer(s)	Length
15.	"Call Me" (live at Lyceum Ballroom, London, November 22, 1998)	Moroder; Harry	4:47
16.	"Rapture" (live at Lyceum Ballroom, London, November 22, 1998)	Stein; Harry	7:07
17.	"Heart of Glass" (live at Lyceum Ballroom, London, November 22, 1998)	Harry; Stein	6:49

Limited edition bonus EP
No.	Title	Writer(s)	Length
1.	"Call Me" (live at Lyceum Ballroom, London, November 22, 1998)	Moroder; Harry	4:47
2.	"Rapture" (live at Lyceum Ballroom, London, November 22, 1998)	Stein; Harry	7:07
3.	"Dreaming" (live at Lyceum Ballroom, London, November 22, 1998)	Harry; Stein	3:21
4.	"Heart of Glass" (live at Lyceum Ballroom, London, November 22, 1998)	Harry; Stein	6:49

Japanese edition bonus track
No.	Title	Writer(s)	Length
15.	"Hot Shot"	Andrew Kahn; Kurt Borusiewicz	3:46

2001 reissue bonus tracks
No.	Title	Writer(s)	Length
15.	"Hot Shot"	Kahn; Borusiewicz	3:46
16.	"Rapture" (live at Lyceum Ballroom, London, November 22, 1998)	Stein; Harry	7:07
17.	"Heart of Glass" (live at Lyceum Ballroom, London, November 22, 1998)	Harry; Stein	6:49

2025 Deluxe Edition bonus tracks
No.	Title	Writer(s)	Length
1.	"Hot Shot" (David Wrench 2025 remix)	Kahn; Borusiewicz
2.	"Maria" (Ether Dub Mix)	Destri
3.	"Nothing Is Real but the Girl" (Boilerhouse Lounge Mix)	Destri
4.	"No Exit" (Urban Version Main Mix)	Destri; Harry; Stein; Ashby; Coolio
5.	"Maria" (Talvin Singh Rhythmic Remix Edit)	Destri
6.	"Nothing Is Real but the Girl" (Danny Tenaglia Heart of Trance)	Destri
7.	"Forgive and Forget (Pull Down the Night)" (Ben's Mix)	Stein
8.	"Maria" (White Trash Mix)	Destri

=== Notes ===
- On the 2001 reissue, tracks 15 to 17 are sequenced as one track with a total duration of 17:51.

== Personnel ==
Credits adapted from the liner notes of No Exit.

=== Blondie ===
- Clem Burke
- Jimmy Destri
- Deborah Harry
- Chris Stein

=== Additional musicians ===
- Leigh Foxx – bass guitar
- Paul Carbonara – guitar
- James Chance – saxophone
- Candy Dulfer – saxophone (track 5)
- Helen Hooke – violin
- Frank Pagano – percussion
- Dave Ironside – saxophone
- Robert Aaron – tenor saxophone, baritone saxophone, flute
- Rick Davies – trombone
- Ken Fradley – trumpet
- Rik Simpson – drum programming
- Coolio – vocals (track 4)
- Donna Destri – backing vocals
- Cassell Webb – backing vocals
- Jeffrey Lee Pierce – backing vocals
- Nancy West – backing vocals
- Theo Kogan – backing vocals
- Romy Ashby – backing vocals

=== Technical ===
- Craig Leon – production, recording (all tracks); mixing (tracks 1, 7, 9–11, 13, 14)
- Cassell Webb – production assistance
- Mike Shipley – mixing (tracks 2–6, 8)
- Randy Nicklaus – mixing (track 12)
- Michael Tocci – engineering assistance
- John Wydrycs – engineering assistance
- Ian Blanch – engineering assistance
- Milton Chan – engineering assistance
- Tal Miller – engineering assistance
- John Tamburello – technical installation
- Michael Block – technical installation
- Steve Hall – mastering

=== Artwork ===
- Rob Roth – art direction, design, photography
- Jana Paterson – design

== Charts ==
=== Weekly charts ===
Weekly chart performance for No Exit
Chart (1999)	Peak position
Australian Albums (ARIA)	72
Austrian Albums (Ö3 Austria)	20
Belgian Albums (Ultratop Flanders)	45
Canada Top Albums/CDs (RPM)	34
Dutch Albums (Album Top 100)	80
European Albums (Music & Media)	8
French Albums (SNEP)	25
German Albums (Offizielle Top 100)	18
Greek Albums (IFPI)	2
Irish Albums (IRMA)	10
Portuguese Albums (AFP)	6
Scottish Albums (Official Charts)	3
Spanish Albums (AFYVE)	16
Swedish Albums (Sverigetopplistan)	36
Swiss Albums (Schweizer Hitparade)	21
UK Albums (Official Charts)	3
US Billboard 200	18

=== Year-end charts ===
Year-end chart performance for No Exit
Chart (1999)	Position
European Albums (Music & Media)	86
German Albums (Offizielle Top 100)	66
UK Albums (OCC)	76

== Certifications and sales ==
Certifications and sales for No Exit
Region	Certification	Certified units/sales
Portugal	—	8,000
Spain (Promusicae)	Gold	50,000^{^}
United Kingdom (BPI)	Gold	100,000^{^}
United States	—	417,000
Summaries
Worldwide	—	2,000,000
^{^} Shipments figures based on certification alone.
