= No Exit Tour =

1998–99 concert tour by Blondie

- World tour by Blondie
- Location: Europe; North America; Oceania
- Associated album: No Exit
- Start date: October 26, 1998
- End date: November 27, 1999
- Legs: 8
- No. of shows: 113

Blondie concert chronology
- Tracks Across America (1982); No Exit Tour (1998–99); Blondie 2002 Tour (2002)

The No Exit Tour was a 1998–1999 worldwide concert tour by American new wave band Blondie to promote their revival and reformation as a band and their latest album No Exit, which was released during the tour. The tour marked the band's first live performances in 16 years, save for small festival appearances in 1997.

== Background ==
The tour was announced in 1998 and 1999, with tickets going on sale soon after the announcements. The second leg of the North American dates was announced through NBC's Today Show in June 1999.

The 13-month-long tour visited venues across Europe, with a UK and Ireland leg, Australia, before progressing to North America for the 1999 dates, with the USA leg beginning with a heavily promoted 'Blondie's Back' concert on the same day as the release of the album No Exit.

Several songs recorded during the tour were released as No Exit single's B-sides and bonus tracks on several editions of the album itself. Elements of five individual shows were later collected together into the 1999 Live live album. Blondie's performance on February 23, 1999 at New York's Town Hall was released on the Live video album.

== Tour dates ==
Date	City	Country	Venue
Europe
October 26, 1998	Stockholm	Sweden	Cirkus
October 28, 1998	Copenhagen	Denmark	Store Vega
November 1, 1998	Brussels	Belgium	Ancienne Belgique
November 2, 1998	Hamburg	Germany	Docks
November 4, 1998 (Note: The November 4, 1998 concert in Paris was part of Festival Fnac Inrockuptibles.)	Paris	France	Bataclan
November 5, 1998	Amsterdam	Netherlands	Melkweg
November 7, 1998	Berlin	Germany	Columbiahalle
November 9, 1998	Wolverhampton	England	Wolverhampton Civic Hall
November 10, 1998	Newcastle	England	Newcastle City Hall
November 12, 1998	Manchester	England	Manchester Apollo
November 13, 1998	Sheffield	England	Sheffield City Hall
November 15, 1998	Campione d'Italia	Italy	Salone delle Feste del Casinò Municipale
November 17, 1998	Dublin	Ireland	Olympia Theatre
November 18, 1998	Dublin	Ireland	Olympia Theatre
November 19, 1998	Glasgow	Scotland	Barrowland Ballroom
November 21, 1998	London	England	Lyceum Theatre
November 22, 1998	London	England	Lyceum Theatre
November 23, 1998	Nottingham	England	Nottingham Royal Concert Hall
November 25, 1998	Newport	Wales	Newport Centre
November 26, 1998	Reading	England	Rivermead Leisure Complex
November 28, 1998	Poole	England	Poole Arts Centre
November 29, 1998	Plymouth	England	Plymouth Pavilions
Oceania
December 31, 1998 (Note: The December 31, 1998 concert in Lorne was part of Falls Festival.)	Lorne	Australia	Lorne Falls Festival Site
January 2, 1999	Sydney	Australia	Capitol Theatre
North America
February 23, 1999	New York City	United States	The Town Hall
March 10, 1999	Paradise	United States	House of Blues
Europe
April 30, 1999	Leganés	Spain	La Cubierta
May 1, 1999	San Sebastián	Spain	Velódromo de Anoeta
May 2, 1999	Barcelona	Spain	Palau Sant Jordi
North America
May 14, 1999	Uncasville	United States	Wolf Den
May 15, 1999	Boston	United States	Orpheum Theater
May 16, 1999	Toronto	Canada	Massey Hall
May 18, 1999	Upper Darby Township	United States	Tower Theater
May 19, 1999	Washington, D.C.	United States	Nation
May 22, 1999 (Note: The May 22, 1999 concert in Tinley Park was part of Q101 Jamboree.)	Tinley Park	United States	New World Music Theatre
May 23, 1999	Detroit	United States	Fox Theatre
May 25, 1999	Denver	United States	Fillmore Auditorium
May 27, 1999	Paradise	United States	The Joint
May 28, 1999	Los Angeles	United States	Universal Amphitheatre
May 29, 1999	San Diego	United States	SDSU Open Air Theatre
May 30, 1999	San Francisco	United States	The Warfield
June 1, 1999	Seattle	United States	Paramount Theatre
June 2, 1999	Portland	United States	Portland Civic Auditorium
June 10, 1999	New York City	United States	The Theater at Madison Square Garden
June 12, 1999 (Note: The June 12, 1999 concert in Los Angeles was part of Wango Tango.)	Los Angeles	United States	Dodger Stadium
June 13, 1999 (Note: The June 13, 1999 concert in East Troy was part of Tibetan Freedom Concert 1999.)	East Troy	United States	Alpine Valley Music Theatre
Europe
June 16, 1999	Dublin	Ireland	Point Theatre
June 18, 1999	Manchester	England	Manchester Evening News Arena
June 19, 1999	Glasgow	Scotland	Clyde Auditorium
June 21, 1999	Birmingham	England	National Exhibition Centre
June 22, 1999	London	England	Wembley Arena
June 25, 1999 (Note: The June 25, 1999 concert in Pilton was part of Glastonbury Festival.)	Pilton	England	Worthy Farm
June 26, 1999 (Note: The June 26, 1999 concert in St. Gallen was part of Open Air St. Gallen.)	St. Gallen	Switzerland	Sittertobel
June 27, 1999 (Note: The June 27, 1999 concert in The Hague was part of Parkpop.)	The Hague	Netherlands	Zuiderpark
June 28, 1999	Odemira	Portugal	Sede da Juventude Boavista dos Pinheiros
June 29, 1999	Porto	Portugal	Pavilhão Rosa Mota
June 30, 1999	Lisbon	Portugal	Parque das Nações
July 2, 1999 (Note: The July 2, 1999 concert in Turku was part of Ruisrock.)	Turku	Finland	Ruissalo
July 3, 1999 (Note: The July 3, 1999 concert in Hamburg was part of Stadtpark OpenAir.)	Hamburg	Germany	Hamburg Stadtpark
July 4, 1999 (Note: The July 4, 1999 concert in Roskilde was part of Roskilde Festival. The concert in London was part of Party in the Park.)	Roskilde	Denmark	Darupvej
July 4, 1999	London	England	Hyde Park
July 6, 1999 (Note: The July 6, 1999 concert in Dunkirk was part of Festival Côte d'Opale.)	Dunkirk	France	Kursaal Dunkirk
July 8, 1999 (Note: The July 8, 1999 concert in Montreux was part of Montreux Jazz Festival.)	Montreux	Switzerland	Auditorium Stravinski
July 9, 1999 (Note: The July 9, 1999 concert in Belfort was part of Eurockéennes.)	Belfort	France	Presqu'île de Malsaucy
July 10, 1999 (Note: The July 9, 1999 concert in Belfort was part of Nuits de Fourvière.)	Lyon	France	Ancient Theatre of Fourvière
North America
August 6, 1999	Atlantic City	United States	Grand Cayman Ballroom
August 8, 1999	Wantagh	United States	Jones Beach Amphitheater
August 10, 1999	Hampton Beach	United States	Hampton Beach Casino Ballroom
August 11, 1999	Boston	United States	BankBoston Pavilion
August 12, 1999	Cleveland	United States	State Theatre
August 14, 1999	Chicago	United States	Riviera Theatre
August 15, 1999 (Note: The August 15, 1999 concert in West Allis was part of Wisconsin State Fair.)	West Allis	United States	Wisconsin State Fair Park
August 16, 1999	Minneapolis	United States	Guthrie Theater
August 18, 1999	West Valley City	United States	E Center
August 20, 1999	Concord	United States	Concord Pavilion
August 21, 1999	Santa Barbara	United States	Santa Barbara Bowl
August 22, 1999	Los Angeles	United States	Universal Amphitheatre
August 24, 1999	Phoenix	United States	Celebrity Theatre
August 25, 1999	Santa Fe	United States	Paolo Soleri Amphitheater
August 27, 1999	Dallas	United States	Bronco Bowl
August 28, 1999	Houston	United States	Aerial Theater
August 31, 1999	Miami Beach	United States	Jackie Gleason Theater
September 1, 1999	Tampa	United States	USF Sun Dome
September 3, 1999	Atlanta	United States	Tabernacle
September 4, 1999	Myrtle Beach	United States	House of Blues
September 5, 1999	Orlando, Florida	United States	House of Blues
September 17, 1999 (Note: The September 17, 1998 concert in Chicago was part of 1999 Zazz Bash.)	Chicago	United States	Excalibur
October 10, 1999 (Note: The October 10, 1999 concert in Foxborough was part of Mix 98.5 MIXFest 1999.)	Foxborough	Foxboro Stadium	
Europe
October 21, 1999	Vienna	Austria	Libro Music Hall
October 22, 1999	Zagreb	Croatia	Dom Sportova
October 23, 1999	Ljubljana	Slovenia	Tivoli Hall
October 26, 1999	Offenbach	Germany	Stadthalle Offenbach
October 27, 1996	Munich	Germany	Colosseum Munich
October 29, 1999	Madrid	Spain	Sala Universal
October 30, 1999	Brussels	Belgium	Forest National
October 31, 1999	Cologne	Germany	Palladium
November 2, 1999	Fürth	Germany	Stadthalle Fürth
November 3, 1999	Leipzig	Germany	Haus Avensee
November 4, 1999	Berlin	Germany	Columbiahalle
November 7, 1999	London	England	Wembley Arena
November 9, 1999	Cardiff	Wales	Cardiff International Arena
November 10, 1999	Bournemouth	England	Bournemouth International Centre
November 11, 1999	St Austell	England	Cornwall Coliseum
November 13, 1999	London	England	Dockland Arena
November 14, 1999	Brighton	England	Brighton Centre
November 16, 1999	Newcastle	England	Telewest Arena
November 17, 1999	Aberdeen	Scotland	Aberdeen Exhibition and Conference Centre
November 19, 1999	Dublin	Ireland	Point Theatre
November 21, 1999	Belfast	Northern Ireland	King's Hall
November 22, 1999	Manchester	England	Manchester Apollo
November 23, 1999	Birmingham	England	National Exhibition Centre
November 25, 1999	Sheffield	England	Sheffield Arena
November 26, 1999	Glasgow	Scotland	Clyde Auditorium
November 27, 1999	Aberdeen	Scotland	Aberdeen Exhibition and Conference Centre

== Personnel ==
- Debbie Harry – vocals
- Chris Stein – guitars
- Clem Burke – drums
- Jimmy Destri – keyboards
- Paul Carbonara – guitars
- Leigh Foxx – bass
- Peter Danilowitz – auxiliary keyboards
- Matt O'Connor – auxiliary percussion
