= Maria (Blondie song) =

1999 song by Blondie

- Standard non-US artwork

Single by Blondie

from the album No Exit
- Released: January 5, 1999
- Studio: Red Night Recording; Electric Lady; Chung King House of Metal (New York City)
- Genre: Power pop; alternative rock
- Length: 4:51 (album version); 4:09 (radio edit)
- Label: Logic; Beyond
- Songwriter: Jimmy Destri
- Producer: Craig Leon

Blondie singles chronology
"War Child" (1982)	"Maria" (1999)	"Nothing Is Real but the Girl" (1999)

Alternative cover
- Artwork variant for the US edition

Audio sample
- "Maria": file; help

Music video
- "Maria" on YouTube

"Maria" is a song by the American rock band Blondie. It was written by the band's keyboardist Jimmy Destri and was produced by Craig Leon. Taken from their seventh album, No Exit (1999), it was Blondie's first new release since 1982. "Maria" was released to US radio stations on January 5, 1999, then was issued as a retail single in Europe six days later. The song reached number one in the United Kingdom, giving Blondie their sixth UK chart-topper. The song also topped the charts of Greece and Spain, becoming a top-20 hit across Europe and in New Zealand. Its accompanying music video was directed by Roman Coppola.

== Background and composition ==
"Maria" was written by the band's keyboardist, Jimmy Destri, who had penned some of their earlier hits such as "Atomic". He wrote the song while reflecting on his days in Catholic school, when he fantasized about meeting the ideal girl. According to Destri, the track is about teenage desire. A line from the song: "...like a millionaire/walking on imported air", was used in the previous Blondie track "Walk Like Me" (also written by Destri) from the album Autoamerican (1980), and the track shares a similar lyrical motif with their 1977 single "Rip Her to Shreds". "Maria" is written and composed in the key of A major, with Harry's range in the song spanning from the low note of E_{3} to the high note of C♯_{5}.

== Release ==
"Maria" was serviced to all US radio formats on January 5, 1999, guitarist Chris Stein's 49th birthday. A CD release followed in Europe on January 11, 1999. In the United Kingdom, "Maria" was issued as a CD and cassette on February 1, 1999. The CD contains two remixes of the song, and the cassette contains only one of the remixes.

== Critical reception ==
A reviewer from Billboard magazine described the song as a "delectable track", and a "skillfully arranged array of passionate Debbie Harry vocals, great guitar and drum thrusts, and neat harmonica passages that climb into the toll of cathedral bells." It was also noted that "all these touches are in the service of a cool rock/pop intelligence powered by the street smarts that are the Blondie trademark." Scottish newspaper Daily Record commented, "Almost two decades after their last No 1, comeback stars Blondie have gone back to their 'new wave' roots" with "Maria". The Daily Vault's Mark Millan called it a "pop gem", that "kicks off". He added that the singer's "commanding performance" really shows off her impressive range, and stated that "this one is still one of their best singles to date." Troy J. Augusto from Variety named it an "infectious standout song". In 2025, Classic Pop magazine ranked "Maria" number two in their list of "Top 20 Comeback Singles".

== Chart performance ==
"Maria" debuted at number one on the UK Singles Chart on February 7, 1999, giving Blondie their sixth UK number-one single and first chart-topper since "The Tide Is High" in November 1980. It spent 17 nonconsecutive weeks in the top 100, ending the year as the UK's 33rd-best-selling hit. The release of "Maria" came exactly 20 years after "Heart of Glass", Blondie's first UK number-one hit. Across the rest of Europe, "Maria" topped the charts in Greece and Spain and was a top-10 hit in Austria, Flanders, Germany, Iceland, Ireland, Sweden, and Switzerland. It additionally reached the top 20 in Italy and the Netherlands and attained a peak of number five on the Eurochart Hot 100.

"Maria" was not as successful in North America, stalling at number 82 on the US Billboard Hot 100 and number 43 on the Canadian RPM 100 Hit Tracks chart; however, it did enter the top 20 on the Billboard Adult Top 40, Dance Club Play, and Maxi-Singles Sales charts. The single also underperformed in Australia, where it peaked at number 59, but fared better in New Zealand, reaching number 16 during its third week on the country's chart.

== Music video ==
The music video for "Maria" was directed by American filmmaker Roman Coppola (credited as Alan Smithee), and takes place in New York City. Parts of New York through night-vision goggles are seen before zooming into an apartment where Blondie are performing the song. Mysterious dark-clothed individuals are seen around different buildings setting up surveillance equipment to monitor the band. Toward the end of the video, one of the dark-clothed individuals aims a sniper rifle towards lead singer Deborah Harry, and fires a bullet at her. In slow motion, the bullet smashes through a window, a light bulb and the microphone towards her, but Harry (moving in real time) simply plucks the bullet from the air before it hits her.

== Track listings ==
- US 12-inch single

A1. "Maria" (Soul Solution full remix)
A2. "Maria" (Soul Solution Bonus Beats)
B1. "Maria" (Talvin Singh remix)
B2. "Maria" (Talvin Singh Rhythmic remix edit)
B3. "Maria" (album version)

- US maxi-CD single (The Remixes)
1. "Maria" (Soul Solution full remix) – 9:27
2. "Maria" (Talvin Singh remix) – 7:27
3. "Maria" (Talvin Singh Rhythmic remix edit) – 4:39
4. "Maria" (album version) – 4:51
- UK CD single
1. "Maria" (radio edit)
2. "Maria" (Soul Solution remix radio edit)
3. "Maria" (Talvin Singh remix edit)
- UK cassette single

A. "Maria" (radio edit)
B. "Maria" (Soul Solution remix radio edit)

- European CD single
1. "Maria" (radio edit) – 4:09
2. "Maria" (Talvin Singh Rhythmic remix) – 7:26
- European limited-edition CD single
1. "Maria" (radio edit)
2. "Screaming Skin" (live)
3. "In the Flesh" (live)
- European maxi-CD single and Australian CD single
1. "Maria" (radio edit) – 4:09
2. "Maria" (Talvin Singh Rhythmic remix) – 7:26
3. "Maria" (Soul Solution remix radio edit) – 4:08
4. "Maria" (album version) – 4:51

== Credits and personnel ==
Credits are lifted from the UK and US single liner notes.

Studios

- Recorded at Red Night Recording, Electric Lady Studios, Chung King House of Metal (New York City)
- Mixed at Encore Studios (Los Angeles)

Blondie

- Jimmy Destri – writing, keyboards
- Deborah Harry – vocals
- Chris Stein – guitar
- Clem Burke – drums

Additional musicians

- Leigh Foxx – bass guitar
- Paul Carbonara – guitar

Production

- Craig Leon – production, recording
- Cassell Webb – production assistance
- Mike Shipley – mixing
- Steve Hall – mastering
- Rob Roth – art direction, photography

== Charts ==
=== Weekly charts ===
Weekly chart performance for "Maria"
Chart (1999)	Peak position
Australia (ARIA)	59
Austria (Ö3 Austria Top 40)	2
Belgium (Ultratop 50 Flanders)	3
Belgium (Ultratop 50 Wallonia)	30
Canada Top Singles (RPM)	43
Canada Adult Contemporary (RPM)	28
Estonia (Eesti Top 20)	14
Europe (Eurochart Hot 100)	5
France (SNEP)	31
Germany (GfK)	3
Greece (IFPI)	1
Iceland (Íslenski Listinn Topp 40)	10
Ireland (IRMA)	3
Italy (Musica e dischi)	15
Italy Airplay (Music & Media)	9
Netherlands (Dutch Top 40)	17
Netherlands (Single Top 100)	19
New Zealand (Recorded Music NZ)	16
Poland Airplay (Music & Media)	1
Scottish Singles Sales (Official Charts)	1
Spain (Promusicae)	1
Sweden (Sverigetopplistan)	7
Switzerland (Schweizer Hitparade)	3
UK Singles (Official Charts)	1
US Billboard Hot 100	82
US Adult Pop Airplay (Billboard)	14
US Dance Club Songs (Billboard)	9
US Dance Singles Sales (Billboard)	3

=== Year-end charts ===
Year-end chart performance for "Maria"
Chart (1999)	Position
Austria (Ö3 Austria Top 40)	13
Belgium (Ultratop 50 Flanders)	18
Europe (Eurochart Hot 100)	19
Germany (Media Control)	11
Italy (Musica e dischi)	98
Netherlands (Dutch Top 40)	70
Netherlands (Single Top 100)	78
Romania (Romanian Top 100)	54
Spain (AFYVE)	8
Sweden (Hitlistan)	31
Switzerland (Schweizer Hitparade)	20
UK Singles (OCC)	33
UK Airplay (Music Week)	26
US Adult Top 40 (Billboard)	46
US Maxi-Singles Sales (Billboard)	24

== Certifications ==
Region	Certification	Certified units/sales
Belgium (BRMA)	Gold	25,000^{*}
Germany (BVMI)	Platinum	500,000^{^}
Spain (Promusicae)	Gold	30,000^{‡}
Sweden (GLF)	Platinum	30,000^{^}
United Kingdom (BPI)	Platinum	600,000^{‡}
Summaries
Worldwide	—	1,500,000
^{*} Sales figures based on certification alone.^{^} Shipments figures based on certification alone.^{‡} Sales+streaming figures based on certification alone.

== Release history ==
Region	Date	Format(s)	Label(s)	Ref.
United States	January 5, 1999	All radio formats	Beyond	
Europe	January 11, 1999	CD	Beyond	
United Kingdom	February 1, 1999	CD; cassette	Beyond	
