= (I'm Always Touched by Your) Presence, Dear =

- UK vinyl single picture sleeve

Single by Blondie

from the album Plastic Letters
- B-side: "Poet's Problem"; "Detroit 442"
- Released: April 1978
- Recorded: 1977
- Studio: Plaza Sound Studios
- Genre: New wave
- Length: 2:43
- Label: Chrysalis (UK)
- Songwriter: Gary Valentine
- Producer: Richard Gottehrer

Blondie singles chronology
"Denis" (1978)	"(I'm Always Touched by Your) Presence, Dear" (1978)	"Picture This" (1978)

Audio sample
- file; help

Music video
- "(I'm Always Touched by Your) Presence, Dear" on YouTube

"(I'm Always Touched by Your) Presence, Dear" is a song by the American band Blondie, from their 1978 album Plastic Letters. Written by former Blondie bassist Gary Valentine, the song was based on the telepathic connections that Valentine believed he experienced with his girlfriend, journalist Lisa Jane Persky, while on tour. Though Valentine had recently left the band, drummer Clem Burke convinced the band to record the song for Plastic Letters.

"Presence, Dear" was released in 1978 as the second single from Plastic Letters, reaching number 10 in the UK singles chart in May 1978. It was never released as a single in the US. The song has since seen critical acclaim and has been ranked by some music writers as one of the band's best songs.

== Background ==
It was written by Blondie bass player Gary Valentine for his then-girlfriend, the actress and journalist Lisa Jane Persky, before his departure from the band. Valentine had also written the band's first single, "X Offender". In a 2012 interview, Valentine jokingly explained that the song concerns a telepathic connection between him and Persky.

"That was about these paranormal experiences I was having with my girlfriend at the time. We were in telepathic contact with each other when I was on tour. We would discover we’d be having the same dreams and we always seemed to know what the other was doing, which sometimes proved uncomfortable!"

More seriously, in New York Rocker: My Life in the Blank Generation Valentine wrote: "During the Iggy [Pop] tour we discovered we were having the same kind of dreams or found we were thinking of each other at the same time. Although we were thousands of miles apart, we were still in touch. Thinking of this one afternoon, it all came together in a song." The lyrics include references to kismet, theosophy, R.E.M, levitation and the stratosphere.

Though Valentine had left the band by the recording of the band's second album, Plastic Letters, drummer Clem Burke convinced the band to record "Presence, Dear" for the album. Gary Valentine's version of the song was released on the 2003 compilation of his work in music, titled Tomorrow Belongs to You.

== Release ==
"Presence, Dear" was released as the second single from Plastic Letters. It was issued in both 7" and 12" formats in the UK, with two songs on the B-side, as were previous singles, "Rip Her to Shreds" and "Denis". One of the single's B-side tracks was "Detroit 442", and the other was Jimmy Destri's "Poets Problem", which was not on the original release of Plastic Letters. "Poets Problem" was first issued on CD on the 1993 rarities compilation Blonde and Beyond and later as a bonus track on both the 1994 and 2001 re-releases of Plastic Letters.

As the follow-up to the UK hit "Denis," "Presence, Dear" was a commercial success in the UK, reaching number ten on the UK singles chart. The single also reached number ten in the Netherlands and number 14 in Belgium. The single did not chart in the US.

Blondie performed the song on the BBC2 television show The Old Grey Whistle Test in 1978.

== Reception ==
"Presence, Dear" has seen critical acclaim since its release. Stewart Mason of AllMusic wrote, "It's one of the group's early highlights, a sweet little power pop love song that features a brilliantly starry-eyed lyric set to an addictive jangly guitar riff. The missing link between Big Star's #1 Record and the dB's Stands for Decibels, '(I'm Always Touched By Your) Presence, Dear' pulls off the difficult trick of being dryly ironic and utterly sincere at the same moment." The Rolling Stone Album Guide called the song a "catchy single" that "taps into Harry's emotional reserves."

GQ ranked the song as Blondie's second best, writing, "If you ever doubted Blondie's ability to be funny, intelligent, culty and yet bubblegum, it's here in the lines of this song: 'We could navigate together, psychic frequencies / Coming into contact with outer entities / We could entertain each one with our theosophies.'" The Daily Telegraph ranked it as one of the band's ten best songs, praising Harry's "glacial" vocals and describing the melody as "so insistent, you might need an exorcist to get it out of your head." New Times Broward-Palm Beach named the song as one of Blondie's five most underrated, noting, "Harry made its sweet ode to infatuation convincing."

== Cover versions ==
Tracey Ullman covered the song in her 1983 album You Broke My Heart in 17 Places. In 1995, Annie Lennox covered it as the B-side of her single "A Whiter Shade of Pale". 10,000 Maniacs covered the song and released it digitally in 2000.

== Release history ==
UK 7" and 12" (CHS 2217)

=== Side one ===
1. "(I'm Always Touched by Your) Presence, Dear" (Gary Valentine) – 2:43

=== Side two ===
1. "Poets Problem" (Jimmy Destri) – 2:20
2. "Detroit 442" (Jimmy Destri, Chris Stein) – 2:28

== Charts ==
Chart performance for "(I'm Always Touched by Your) Presence, Dear"
Chart (1978)	Peak position
Belgium (Ultratop 50 Flanders)	14
Netherlands (Dutch Top 40)	10
Netherlands (Single Top 100)	8
UK Singles (OCC)	10
