= Sunday Girl =

Single by Blondie

from the album Parallel Lines
- B-side: "I Know But I Don't Know"
- Released: May 1979
- Recorded: Record Plant, New York City June/July 1978
- Genre: Power pop; sunshine pop
- Length: 3:05
- Label: Chrysalis (UK)
- Songwriter: Chris Stein
- Producer: Mike Chapman

Blondie singles chronology
"Heart of Glass" (1979)	"Sunday Girl" (1979)	"One Way or Another" (1979)

Audio sample
- file; help

Music video
- "Sunday Girl" (TopPop, 1978) on YouTube

"Sunday Girl" is a song recorded by the American new wave band Blondie, from the band's 1978 album Parallel Lines. Written by guitarist Chris Stein, the song was inspired by Debbie Harry's cat, who was named Sunday Man—the cat had recently run away, inspiring the song's "plaintive" nature.

"Sunday Girl" was released as the follow-up single to the band's number-one hit, "Heart of Glass", in the UK and Europe (though not in the US). The single was a number-one hit in the UK and Ireland and reached the top ten in several European countries. It has since seen critical acclaim and has been included on several compilation albums.

== Background ==
"Sunday Girl" was written solely by Blondie guitarist Chris Stein. Stein recalled, "I wrote that one all by myself, but I was so nervous about having my own song, I asked [Debbie Harry] to put her name on it. ... We left [the credit] to me in the long run." Stein wrote the song for Harry's cat, who was named Sunday Man. Stein explained, "The cat ran away and we were very sad. It was just a sort of plaintive, evocative number."

The early demo of the song had impressed producer Mike Chapman, who was initially wary of the band's sloppy performing. This early demo featured a Latin-influenced arrangement, which would transform into a more pop-inspired performance on the final album. Like Blondie's earlier single, "Hanging on the Telephone", the drumming pattern of "Sunday Girl" employs a double backbeat rhythm.

Blondie recorded a French-language version of the track. This version was released in the UK on the "Sunday Girl" 12" single; in France and the Netherlands, it was the B-side of the 7". It also appears on the cassette release of Eat to the Beat. For Blondie's first greatest hits album The Best of Blondie in 1981, producer Mike Chapman created a special mix which incorporated one verse sung in French. The bilingual version appears on the 2002 compilation Greatest Hits.

== Release ==
"Sunday Girl" was released as the follow-up single to "Heart of Glass" in the UK and much of Europe. The single reached number one in the UK, topping the charts for three weeks in May 1979. "Sunday Girl" was the band's second consecutive number one hit in the country and would later rank number eight on the year-end UK charts of 1979. The single also reached number one in Ireland and was a top ten hit across Europe. Despite the commercial success abroad, the song was not released as a single in the band's home country of the US, where "One Way or Another" was picked as the next single instead.

"Sunday Girl" was initially released in Australia as the lead single from Parallel Lines, but failed to chart; however, it was later re-released as a double A-side with "Heart of Glass", on the back of its UK success, resulting in the song reaching number five in the country.

In 2013, Blondie themselves re-recorded the song and offered it to be included in the CBGB's film soundtrack. This version was included on their 2014 compilation album Greatest Hits Deluxe Redux. The compilation was part of a 2-disc set called Blondie 4(0) Ever which included their 10th studio album Ghosts of Download and marked the 40th anniversary of the forming of the band.

In 2022, UMC/Numero Group released a 2x7" pack for Record Store Day. Limited to 3000 copies, it included 4 versions of Sunday Girl over two 7" singles with previously unreleased demo and live version. One of the singles was pressed on yellow vinyl, while the other was pressed on red vinyl. The EP became available digitally later that year.

== Reception ==
"Sunday Girl" has seen critical acclaim since its release. Rolling Stone wrote of the song, "The melting, metallic 'Sunday Girl' features Debbie Harry's voice at its thickest and most cynically sweet, proving she was always a one-girl girl group." Tom Maginnis of AllMusic wrote, "The song is pure pop, a dulcet, charming throwback to the innocent sounds of the Beach Boys and uninhibited music of early rock, particularly that of girl vocal groups such as the Ronnettes and the Shangri-Las." Pitchfork wrote that the song "conveys a sense of elegance," while Slant Magazine wrote "The '60s-girl-group-pop meets '70s-new-wave of 'Pretty Baby' and 'Sunday Girl' give Parallel Lines its two most whimsical moments."

Paste ranked the song as the band's seventh best, calling it "among the band's best pop efforts" and writing, "Slick lines like 'I know a girl from a lonely street, cold as ice cream but still as sweet' bolster the catchy hook and show the band's reverence for complicated-but-all-too-familiar teen love stories." uDiscoverMusic named it as one of the 20 best Blondie songs, writing that the song is a "standout, a piece of sweet pop perfection that sounds ever sweeter in French."

== Cover versions ==
British post-punk band Family Fodder covered the song twice on their debut album Sunday Girls (A Tribute To Blondie By Family Fodder And Friends) in 1979, creating "Pt. 1" and "Pt. 2" variations on the original.

The shoegazing band Lush performed the French version of this song for their 1994 Black Sessions. Lush frontwoman Miki Berenyi stated during an interview that she had been "completely obsessed" with Blondie when she was younger, praising the band's lyricism.

In 2010 a remake of this song was made by the English performer Florrie. It had slightly different lyrics and was used for a Nina Ricci perfume commercial. The song was covered in 2013 by the band She & Him on the album Volume 3.

In 2022, The Wiggles covered this song on disc 2 of the double album ReWiggled.

== Track listing ==
UK 7" (Chrysalis / CHS 2320)
No.	Title	Writer(s)	Length
1.	"Sunday Girl"	Chris Stein	3:01
2.	"I Know But I Don't Know"	Frank Infante	3:53

UK 12" (Chrysalis / CHS 12 2320)
No.	Title	Writer(s)	Length
1.	"Sunday Girl"	Chris Stein	3:01
2.	"Sunday Girl (French Version)"	Chris Stein	3:01
3.	"I Know But I Don't Know"	Frank Infante	3:53

UK 2x7" (RSD 2022) (UMC / 5393433)
No.	Title	Writer(s)	Length
1.	"Sunday Girl (Original Single)"	Chris Stein	3:01
2.	"Sunday Girl (French Version)"	Chris Stein	3:01
3.	"Sunday Girl (Demo)"	Chris Stein	2:50
4.	"Sunday Girl (Live)"	Chris Stein	2:58

== Chart performance ==
=== Weekly charts ===
Chart (1978–1979)	Peak Position
Austria (Ö3 Austria Top 40)	5
Belgium (Ultratop 50 Flanders)	23
Finland (Suomen virallinen lista)	12
Ireland (IRMA)	1
Netherlands (Dutch Top 40)	22
Netherlands (Single Top 100)	13
Norway (VG-lista)	5
Sweden (Sverigetopplistan)	18
South Africa (Springbok Radio)	8
Switzerland (Schweizer Hitparade)	5
UK Singles (Official Charts)	1
West Germany (GfK)	6

Chart (2023)	Peak Position
Hungary (Single Top 40)	5

=== Year-end charts ===
Chart (1979)	Position
UK Singles (OCC)	8
West Germany (Official German Charts)	35

== Certifications ==
Region	Certification	Certified units/sales
United Kingdom (BPI)	Gold	500,000^{^}
^{^} Shipments figures based on certification alone.

== See also ==
- List of number-one singles of 1979 (Ireland)
- List of UK Singles Chart number ones of the 1970s
