= Frank Infante =

American guitarist and bassist (born 1951)

- Born: Frank William Infante; November 15, 1951 (age 74); Jersey City, New Jersey, U.S.
- Genres: Rock; punk rock; pop; new wave; blues
- Occupation: Musician
- Instruments: Guitar; bass
- Years active: 1970s–present
- Labels: EMI; Chrysalis; Warner Bros.

Frank William Infante (born November 15, 1951) is an American guitarist and bassist best known as a former member of the new wave band Blondie.

== Early career and Blondie ==
Infante began his music career playing guitar in hard rock and electric blues groups such as The Elegant End and World War III. He joined Sniper in 1975 and then Blondie in 1977 as a session player, replacing bassist Gary Valentine. Blondie released their second album Plastic Letters in 1978. Infante played bass and guitar on the album but was not pictured on its cover. Later in 1978, Blondie recruited bassist Nigel Harrison, which allowed Infante to switch to guitar full-time. Record producer Mike Chapman has said that he considered Infante to be an "amazing guitarist" and the most technically proficient member of Blondie when he began producing Parallel Lines in 1978. Although the group was already a commercial force in the UK and Australia, Parallel Lines and its follow-up Eat to the Beat (1979) proved to be Blondie's commercial breakthroughs in the US.

After sessions for the band's 1980 album Autoamerican, Infante sued the group for his alleged minimal involvement in the recording (which would affect his royalties), but the matter was settled out of court. Infante stayed on as an official member of Blondie for the 1982 album The Hunter, but Deborah Harry has claimed in interviews that despite receiving credit, Infante's participation in the sessions was essentially non-existent. Infante was no longer a member of the group during their tour in July and August 1982, and Blondie officially broke up by the end of the year.

Throughout his time with Blondie, Infante contributed to writing a handful of their songs, including "Victor" and "I Know but I Don't Know", plus a demo from the Parallel Lines sessions titled "Underground Girl". Infante was not asked to rejoin when Blondie reformed in the late 1990s, and he, along with Harrison (who was also unsuccessful in rejoining), sued the other members of the band for reforming without them, but the lawsuits were unsuccessful.

== After Blondie ==
During Blondie's hiatus in 1981, Infante went on to work on Joan Jett's album Bad Reputation. He also worked on albums by Stiv Bators and Sylvain Sylvain. Shortly afterward, he toured and recorded with acts including Iggy Pop and Divinyls. Iggy Pop's German compilation Nuggets in 1999 and UK box set Where The Faces Shine in 2009 both feature live tracks with Infante on guitar.

Blondie were inducted into the Rock and Roll Hall of Fame in March 2006. Seven members were invited to the ceremony, which resulted in an on-stage spat between the extant group and Infante, who asked during the live broadcast of the ceremony that he and Nigel Harrison be allowed to perform with the group. Their request was refused by Deborah Harry, who stated that the band's current line-up were already prepared for the performance.

In 2010, Infante toured and performed with The New York Dolls in shows at The Cluny, Newcastle upon Tyne, England. He also played guitar on their album Dancing Backward in High Heels, released in March 2011.

Infante currently lives in Los Angeles. He continues to record and perform with Infante's Inferno with Infante on guitar, former Blondie bandmate Clem Burke (drums), and Steve Fishman (bass). The trio performed at the Rhino Records Pop Up Store in Los Angeles in 2011.

In December 2018, he was recruited by Divinyls guitarist Mark McEntee to participate in an Australian reunion tour, intended to commence in February 2019 but cancelled on the 6th of that month.

== Discography ==
With Blondie

- Plastic Letters (1978)
- Parallel Lines (1978)
- Eat to the Beat (1979)
- Autoamerican (1980)
- The Hunter (1982)

With Joan Jett

- Joan Jett (1980); re-released as Bad Reputation (1981)

With New York Dolls

- Dancing Backward in High Heels (2011)
