= Dreaming (Blondie song) =

Single by Blondie

from the album Eat to the Beat
- B-side: "Sound-A-Sleep"; "Living in the Real World"
- Released: September 14, 1979
- Genre: Power pop; pop-punk; new wave
- Length: 3:08
- Label: Chrysalis
- Songwriters: Chris Stein; Debbie Harry
- Producer: Mike Chapman

Blondie singles chronology
"One Way or Another" (1979)	"Dreaming" (1979)	"Union City Blue" (1979)

Audio sample
- Dreaming: file; help

Music video
- "Dreaming" on YouTube

"Dreaming" is a song by American new wave band Blondie. Released in 1979, the song was the opening track from their fourth album, Eat to the Beat. Written by guitarist Chris Stein and singer Debbie Harry and partially inspired by ABBA's "Dancing Queen", the song also features an active drum performance by drummer Clem Burke, who did not expect the final recording to feature his busy drum track.

"Dreaming" was released as the lead single from Eat to the Beat in September 1979, reaching number two on the UK singles chart and number 27 on the US Billboard Hot 100. The band saw this as a disappointing performance, though the song remained one of the band's highest-charting singles to that point. The song's single release was accompanied by a music video.

The song has since become one of Blondie's most famous tracks, appearing on several compilation albums and becoming a mainstay of the band's live set list. It has since seen critical acclaim, and several music writers have named the song as one of the band's best.

== Background ==
The lyrics for "Dreaming" originated from the line "dreaming is free", which band member Chris Stein thought of. After hearing the music for the song that Stein wrote, Debbie Harry wrote the rest of the lyrics. Harry explained the process of writing the lyrics in an interview with Entertainment Weekly, saying, "Sometimes Chris will come up with a track or a feel and pass it on to me, and he'll say, 'I was thinking "Dreaming/Dreaming is free",' and then I'll fill it out with a story line or some more phrases. A lot of times it's the rhythm track that suggests what the lyric is going to be. I like working like that."

Musically, "Dreaming" is a fast-paced new wave song. Stein has since claimed that "Dreaming" is "pretty much a cop" of "Dancing Queen" by ABBA; he continued, "I don't know if that was where we started, or if it ended just happening to sound like that." Michael Gallucci of Ultimate Classic Rock said the song "tak[es] a cue from Phil Spector's Wall of Sound." Billboard described "Dreaming" as a "driving rocker that moves with rollercoaster intensity" and described Harry's lead vocals as "mesmerizing."

According to the band's keyboardist Jimmy Destri, the song, like many from the Eat to the Beat album, was recorded live in the studio. The song also features a frantic drum performance written by drummer Clem Burke. Burke said of his drumming on the song:

'Dreaming' came out the way it did... because [producer Mike Chapman] really gave me free rein and it was really a surprise. That take of 'Dreaming' was just me kind of blowing through the song. It's not like I expected that to be the take. I was consciously overplaying just for the sake of it because it was a run-through.

== Release ==
The song was released on September 14, 1979 as the first single from Eat to the Beat. While the US release of the single had "Living in the Real World" as the B-side, the British version used "Sound-A-Sleep" instead. Both of those songs likewise feature on Eat to the Beat. A music video was produced to promote the single featuring Debbie Harry wearing a solid blue unitard and matching sheer blouse designed by Stephen Sprouse.

"Dreaming" was most successful as a single in the UK, peaking at number two on the UK singles chart. Burke later expressed disappointment at the song's inability to reach number one in Britain unlike other Blondie singles, saying, "English audiences are notoriously fickle. They go off on people after a while. It's been done before. We're so spoiled by having all those number ones."

The single was also successful in Ireland and Canada, reaching number three and number four respectively. In the US, it peaked at number 27 on the Billboard Hot 100, becoming Blondie's third Top 40 hit there (after "Heart of Glass" (number one) and "One Way or Another" (number 24) earlier in the year). Clem Burke attributed the song's relatively lower chart position to his drumming, saying, "I always say 'Dreaming' would have been a bigger hit had I not played like that. It was Top 40, but it was never a huge hit."

"Dreaming" has since been featured on multiple compilation albums, such as The Best of Blondie (1981), The Complete Picture: The Very Best of Deborah Harry and Blondie (1991), Atomic: The Very Best of Blondie (1998) and Greatest Hits Deluxe Redux in 2014, for which Blondie re-recorded the song.

In 2019, "Dreaming" was used as the opening credits theme song for the third and final season of the HBO drama The Deuce.

== Reception ==
Since its release, "Dreaming" has seen critical acclaim from music writers. Stewart Mason of AllMusic praised Stein's guitar work and Burke's drumming on the song, writing of the latter, "It's an amazing performance, possibly the most over-the-top effort by a rock & roll drummer in the entire 1970s, and a must to hear." Debra Rae Cohen of Rolling Stone wrote that "'Dreaming' makes the keynote statement [of Eat to the Beat]." Christian John Wikane of PopMatters praised Harry's vocals on the song, writing, "She sings with a vocal power unknown to audiences, at the time, who were only familiar with the synthetic thrills on 'Heart of Glass.'" Jim Beviglia of American Songwriter praised the song's "poignancy" and stated, "Blondie's songs tend to be so much fun that's it's easy to overlook their depth and the craft behind them. Don't make that mistake with 'Dreaming,' or you might miss the hurting yet ultimately hopeful heart beating inside that pristine pop shell." Cash Box said it has "a pounding, chugging rhythm and Harry's distinctive 'girl-group' vocals" and more "pop power" than the Knack. Billboard called it a "a driving rocker that moves at rollercoaster intensity" and praised Debbie Harry's lead vocals as "clear and mesmerizing."

Several critics have ranked "Dreaming" as one of Blondie's best songs. Billboard writers named "Dreaming" as the fourth-best Blondie song, writing, "The feel-good, uplifting vibes of this power pop ballad still hold their influence today." Ultimate Classic Rock named it the band's fifth-best song, stating, "'Dreaming' wraps everything Blondie did so well—girl-group bounce, big pop hook, the meshing of styles and eras—in the thickest battalion of drums and backing vocals they ever recorded." uDiscoverMusic named the song as one of the top 20 Blondie songs. In 2021, it was listed at No. 414 on Rolling Stone's "Top 500 Best Songs of All Time".

== Live performances ==
"Dreaming" has become a staple of Blondie's live performances, being performed for a time as the second track in the band's set list. Blondie notably performed the song live on a fifth-season episode of Saturday Night Live hosted by Steve Martin in 1979, a performance that ended with Burke jumping over his drum set toward the camera. Burke later described the video of the performance as "awesome".

Lead singer Debbie Harry performed a version of the song with the Dum Dum Girls at South by Southwest in 2014. Josh Terry of Consequence of Sound described the rendition as "woozy" and "upbeat".

== Cover versions ==
- American alternative rock band The Smashing Pumpkins released a cover of "Dreaming" as a b-side to their smash-hit single "Bullet with Butterfly Wings", released on October 16, 1995; in the next year it would be included on their compilation album The Aeroplane Flies High, released on November 26, 1996.
- American indie rock band Yo La Tengo released a cover of "Dreaming" on the 1992 new wave compilation/tribute album Freedom of Choice: Yesterday's New Wave Hits as Performed by Today's Stars.
- American rock/pop punk band Green Day released a cover of "Dreaming" as a standalone single on May 22, 2020. Its music video features the band reminiscing about days gone by, while also featuring footage from past tours of the band both on the road and performing live.

== Charts ==
=== Weekly charts ===
Chart (1979)	Peak position
Australia (Kent Music Report)	53
Austria (Ö3 Austria Top 40)	18
Belgium (Ultratop 50 Flanders)	16
Canada Top Singles (RPM)	4
Finland (Suomen virallinen lista)	20
Ireland (IRMA)	3
Netherlands (Dutch Top 40)	18
Netherlands (Single Top 100)	12
New Zealand (Recorded Music NZ)	9
Norway (VG-lista)	6
Sweden (Sverigetopplistan)	19
UK Singles (Official Charts)	2
US Billboard Hot 100	27
US Cash Box Top 100	20
US Record World	23
West Germany (GfK)	26

=== Year-end charts ===
Chart (1979)	Position
Canada Top Singles (RPM)	60
UK Singles (OCC)	35

== Certifications ==
Region	Certification	Certified units/sales
United Kingdom (BPI)	Silver	250,000^{^}
^{^} Shipments figures based on certification alone.

== Release history ==
UK 7" (CHS 2359, September 1979)

1. "Dreaming" (Deborah Harry, Chris Stein) — 3:08
2. "Sound-A-Sleep" (Harry, Stein) — 4:18

US 7" (CHS 2379, September 1979)

1. "Dreaming" (Deborah Harry, Chris Stein) — 3:08
2. "Living in the Real World" (Jimmy Destri) — 2:53

US 12" Promo (CHS14-PDJ, September 1979)

1. "Dreaming" (Deborah Harry, Chris Stein) — 3:08
2. "Dreaming" (Deborah Harry, Chris Stein) — 3:08
