= Rip Her to Shreds =

Single by Blondie

from the album Blondie
- B-side: "In the Flesh"; "X Offender"
- Released: November 1977
- Recorded: 1976
- Genre: Punk rock; new wave; synth-rock; pop-punk
- Length: 3:23
- Label: Chrysalis (UK)
- Songwriters: Deborah Harry, Chris Stein
- Producer: Richard Gottehrer

Blondie singles chronology
"In the Flesh" (1976)	"Rip Her to Shreds" (1977)	"Denis" (1978)

"Rip Her to Shreds" is a song by American new wave band Blondie, which features on the band's self-titled debut album.

== Single information ==
In a BBC Radio documentary about Blondie, lead singer Debbie Harry stated that "Rip Her to Shreds" is about what gossip columns do to people's lives. According to guitarist Chris Stein, the song is an homage to the Velvet Underground song "I'm Waiting for the Man".

"Rip Her to Shreds" was Blondie's first UK single, released on Chrysalis Records in the UK in late 1977, though it did not chart. The single peaked at No. 81 in Australia in March 1978. The B-sides to this single were "In the Flesh" and "X Offender", both previously issued as A-side singles by Private Stock Records, and both moderately successful in certain territories. As a promotional gimmick the song was also released as a 12" single, at that time a relative rarity, selling for 99p.

"Rip Her to Shreds" was included on Blondie's first greatest hits compilation The Best of Blondie, released in October 1981.

Two versions of the song are featured in the 2011 film Bridesmaids where the original studio version plays in the opening of the film and the live version plays during the end credits.

Blondie re-recorded the song for their 2014 compilation album Greatest Hits Deluxe Redux. The compilation was part of a 2-disc set called Blondie 4(0) Ever which included their 10th studio album Ghosts of Download and marked the 40th anniversary of the forming of the band.

== Charts ==
Chart (1978)	Peak
Australia (Kent Music Report)	81

== Release history ==
UK 7", 12" (CHS 2180)

1. "Rip Her to Shreds" (Deborah Harry / Chris Stein) – 3:22
2. "In the Flesh" (Harry / Stein) – 2:33
3. "X Offender" (Harry / Gary Valentine) – 3:14

== Covers ==
Pop duo Boomkat recorded a version of the song for 2004 film Mean Girls.
