= In the Flesh (Blondie song) =

Single by Blondie

from the album Blondie
- B-side: "Man Overboard"
- Released: October 1976 (Private Stock); 1977 (Chrysalis)
- Recorded: 1976
- Genre: New wave
- Length: 2:33
- Label: Private Stock; Chrysalis
- Songwriter(s): Deborah Harry, Chris Stein
- Producer(s): Richard Gottehrer

Blondie singles chronology
"X Offender" (1976)	"In the Flesh" (1976)	"Rip Her to Shreds" (1977)

Music video
- "In the Flesh" on YouTube

Alternative cover
- Australian edition of the "In The Flesh" single, the first Blondie single to be issued on the Chrysalis label.

"In the Flesh" is a song by American band Blondie and their first to chart. Originally from the band's self-titled debut album, Blondie, the song was Blondie's second and final single on the Private Stock label.

== Song information ==
The song has a feel reminiscent of Phil Spector-produced pop music from the early 1960s, with prominent piano, female backing vocals, and a time signature of 12/8.

Record World said that "Deborah Harry's vocal is a knockout."

In Australia, after the song was played by mistake (instead of "X Offender") on the nationally broadcast music program Countdown, it was well received by the viewing audience. Chrysalis Records re-released the song as a single in Australia, again with "Man Overboard" as the B-side. When it reached number two on the Kent Music Report in November 1977, Australia became the first territory in which Blondie achieved a hit single. In Countdown host Ian "Molly" Meldrum's 2014 autobiography, Debbie Harry elaborated saying "We met Ian in 1977... he asked if we had any videos [and] we gave him videos for "X Offender" and "In the Flesh". On Countdown, they were meant to play "X Offender", but they played "In the Flesh" instead. So our success in Australia was one big mistake."

"In the Flesh" was featured in the 1982 film The Last American Virgin. The song was also featured in the film 200 Cigarettes (1999) and A Nightmare on Elm Street 4: The Dream Master and was featured on the ABC show Wicked City. The song was covered by fictional band Low Shoulder in the 2009 film Jennifer's Body.

== Release history ==
U.S. 7" (PS-45.141) / (PVT 1329 SP)

1. "In the Flesh" (Harry / Stein) – 2:33
2. "Man Overboard" (Harry) – 3:22

US 7" Promo (PSR-45.141)

1. "In the Flesh" (Stereo Version)
2. "In the Flesh" (Mono Version)
- Labeled as a promo. Contains stereo and mono versions on opposite sides

UK 7" (PVT 105)

1. "In the Flesh" (Harry, Chris Stein) – 2:33
2. "X Offender" (Harry, Valentine) – 3:13

Australia 7" 1st release: Private Stock (PVT-11532) 2nd release: Chrysalis (K-6932)

1. "In the Flesh" (Harry / Stein) – 2:33
2. "Man Overboard" (Harry) – 3:22

== Charts ==
=== Weekly charts ===
Chart (1977)	Peak position
Australia (Kent Music Report)	2
Chart (1982)	Peak position
Belgium (Ultratop 50 Flanders)	40

=== Year-end charts ===
Chart (1977)	Position
Australia (Kent Music Report)	36
