= Autoamerican =

Studio album by Blondie
- Released: November 19, 1980
- Recorded: 1980
- Studios: United Western Recorders (Hollywood, California)
- Genre: Art rock
- Length: 46:39 (LP); 50:54 (Cassette)
- Label: Chrysalis
- Producer: Mike Chapman

Blondie chronology
Eat to the Beat (1979)	Autoamerican (1980)	The Best of Blondie (1981)

Singles from Autoamerican
- 1. "The Tide Is High" Released: October 31, 1980; 2. "Rapture" Released: January 12, 1981

Professional ratings
Review scores
Source	Rating
AllMusic	3/5 stars
Christgau's Record Guide: The '80s	B−
Encyclopedia of Popular Music	2/5 stars
Record Mirror	3/5 stars
Rolling Stone	1/5 stars
The New Rolling Stone Album Guide	3/5 stars

Autoamerican is the fifth studio album by American rock band Blondie. It was released in the US on November 19, 1980 and in the UK on November 29, 1980 and reached No. 3 in the UK charts, No. 7 in the US and No. 8 in Australia. The album spawned two singles, "The Tide Is High" and "Rapture". "The Tide Is High" hit number one in several countries, including the US and the UK. "Rapture" became the first rap song ever to reach number one on the singles chart in the US. It also reached number five in the UK, number four in Australia and number three in Canada.

== Background ==
The album was a radical departure for Blondie, with the opening track "Europa" setting the pace. The track is a dramatic instrumental overture featuring orchestral arrangements and ending with vocalist Debbie Harry declaiming a passage about automobile culture over an electronic soundtrack. Besides rock and pop tracks, the band explored a wide range of other musical genres: "Here's Looking at You" and "Faces" show jazz and blues influences, "The Tide Is High" was a cover of the Paragons' 1967 Jamaican rocksteady song, whereas "Rapture" combined funk, rock, jazz and even saw them embracing the then-emerging genre of rap. The closing track, "Follow Me", was a cover of a torch song from Alan Jay Lerner and Frederick Loewe's 1960 Broadway musical Camelot.

Producer Mike Chapman insisted the band record in Los Angeles. Guitarist Chris Stein lamented: "Every day we get up, stagger into the blinding sun, [and] drive past a huge Moon-mobile from some ancient sci-fi movie." Drummer Clem Burke welcomed the change: "Autoamerican was fun. We got to spend two months in California. I'm always up for a free ride." However, the band insisted on the cover artwork shot being from their hometown, posing on a roof near New York's Broadway and Eighth (more precisely 300 Mercer Street). The image was taken from a commissioned painting by artist Martin Hoffman (1935–2013).

In a 2020 interview with American Songwriter, to mark the 40th anniversary of the album, Stein revealed the intended title was Coca Cola, as it sounded "very American" but The Coca-Cola Company declined the idea.

The band released two singles from this album, "The Tide Is High" and "Rapture". "The Tide Is High" hit number one in several countries, including on the US Billboard Hot 100 and the UK singles chart. "Rapture" became the first rap song ever to reach number one on the singles chart in the US. It also reached number five in the UK and number four in Australia. Though these singles proved successful, the record company was initially hesitant about the album's commercial prospects. Burke recalled, "When we gave the album to the record company, they basically said they didn't hear any hits. And that was their quote: 'We don't hear a single'. It had two number ones! And both were very innovative as well."

Autoamerican was digitally remastered and reissued with two bonus tracks by Chrysalis Records in the UK in 1994 which included the extended 12″ Special Disco Mix versions of "Rapture" and its B-side "Live It Up", from 1981. The album was again remastered and re-released by EMI-Capitol in 2001, again featuring the extended version of "Rapture" along with the full-length version of their number-one single "Call Me" (from the film soundtrack to American Gigolo), as well as "Suzy & Jeffrey", which was originally the B-side to "The Tide Is High".

== Reception ==
In Rolling Stone, Tom Carson said, "Autoamerican is a terrible album. After Parallel Lines gave Chris Stein a carte blanche, it was only a matter of time until he started living out his fantasies of himself as a deep thinker. Stein is no longer depriving the world of his "genius", because Autoamerican is his LP all the way. Indeed, it’s such an anthology of intellectual onanism that it’s almost the rock equivalent of a godawful Ken Russell movie. I wonder if the reason Chris Stein is so eager to proclaim the death of pop culture is so he can beat the hyenas to its bones."

== Track listing ==
Side one
No.	Title	Writer(s)	Length
1.	"Europa"	Chris Stein	3:32
2.	"Live It Up"	Stein	4:10
3.	"Here's Looking at You"	Debbie Harry; Stein	2:58
4.	"The Tide Is High"	John Holt	4:42
5.	"Angels on the Balcony"	Laura Davis; Jimmy Destri	3:36
6.	"Go Through It"	Harry; Stein	2:40

Side two
No.	Title	Writer(s)	Length
7.	"Do the Dark"	Destri	3:53
8.	"Rapture"	Stein; Harry	6:33
9.	"Faces"	Harry	3:51
10.	"T-Birds"	Nigel Harrison; Harry	3:58
11.	"Walk Like Me"	Destri	3:46
12.	"Follow Me"	Alan Jay Lerner; Frederick Loewe	3:00

Cassette edition bonus track
No.	Title	Writer(s)	Length
7.	"Susie and Jeffrey" (B-side to "The Tide Is High" single)	Harry; Harrison	4:10

1994 CD reissue bonus tracks
No.	Title	Writer(s)	Length
13.	"Rapture" (Special Disco Mix)	Stein; Harry	9:59
14.	"Live It Up" (Special Disco Mix)	Stein	8:13

2001 CD reissue bonus tracks
No.	Title	Writer(s)	Length
13.	"Call Me" (Original Long Version)	Giorgio Moroder; Harry	8:06
14.	"Suzie and Jeffrey" (B-side to "The Tide Is High" single)	Harry; Harrison	4:10
15.	"Rapture" (Special Disco Mix)	Stein; Harry	9:59

Japanese limited release bonus 7" tracks
No.	Title	Writer(s)	Length
1.	"Call Me (Spanish Version)"	Harry; Moroder	3:29
2.	"Heroes (Live with Robert Fripp)"	David Bowie	6:15

== Personnel ==
Credits adapted from the liner notes of Autoamerican.

=== Blondie ===
- Clem Burke – drums
- Jimmy Destri – electric keyboards
- Nigel Harrison – bass guitar
- Deborah Harry – vocals
- Frank Infante – guitar
- Chris Stein – guitar, tympani

=== Additional musicians ===
- Wah Wah Watson – guitar on "Live It Up"
- Howard Kaylan – vocals on "T-Birds"
- Mark Volman – vocals on "T-Birds"
- Tom Scott – saxophone on "Rapture" and "Faces", Lyricon on "Do the Dark"
- Ollie Brown – percussion on "The Tide Is High"
- Emil Richards – percussion on "The Tide Is High"
- Alex Acuña – percussion on "The Tide Is High"
- Steve Goldstein – piano on "Faces", synthesizers on "Follow Me"
- B-Girls – backing vocals on "Live It Up"
- Jimmie Haskell – string and horn arrangements on "Here's Looking at You", "The Tide Is High", "Europa" and "Go Through It"
- Ray Brown – bass guitar on "Faces"
- Scott Lesser – percussion on "Live It Up"

=== Technical ===
- Mike Chapman – production
- Lenise Bent – engineering
- Doug Schwartz – engineering assistance
- Gary Boatner – engineering assistance
- Kevin Flaherty – production (2001 reissue)

=== Artwork ===
- Martin Hoffman – painting
- John Van Hamersveld – design
- Karen Knecht – peach
- Billy Bass – art direction

== Charts ==
=== Weekly charts ===
Weekly chart performance for Autoamerican
Chart (1980–1981)	Peak position
Australian Albums (Kent Music Report)	8
Austrian Albums (Ö3 Austria)	18
Canada Top Albums/CDs (RPM)	3
Dutch Albums (Album Top 100)	16
Finnish Albums (Suomen virallinen lista)	16
German Albums (Offizielle Top 100)	42
Italian Albums (Musica e dischi)	17
New Zealand Albums (RMNZ)	6
Norwegian Albums (VG-lista)	12
Swedish Albums (Sverigetopplistan)	11
UK Albums (Official Charts)	3
US Billboard 200	7
US Top R&B/Hip-Hop Albums (Billboard)	25

=== Year-end charts ===
1980 year-end chart performance for Autoamerican
Chart (1980)	Position
UK Albums (BMRB)	41

1981 year-end chart performance for Autoamerican
Chart (1981)	Position
Australian Albums (Kent Music Report)	28
Canada Top Albums/CDs (RPM)	23
New Zealand Albums (RMNZ)	31
US Billboard 200	28

== Certifications ==
Certifications for Autoamerican
Region	Certification	Certified units/sales
Canada (Music Canada)	3× Platinum	300,000^{^}
New Zealand (RMNZ)	Gold	7,500^{^}
United Kingdom (BPI)	Platinum	300,000^{^}
United States (RIAA)	Platinum	1,000,000^{^}
^{^} Shipments figures based on certification alone.
