= Plastic Letters =

Studio album by Blondie
- Released: February 1978
- Recorded: June–July 1977
- Studio: Plaza Sound (New York City)
- Genre: New wave; pop rock; punk rock
- Length: 34:46
- Label: Chrysalis
- Producer: Richard Gottehrer

Blondie chronology
Blondie (1976)	Plastic Letters (1978)	Parallel Lines (1978)

Singles from Plastic Letters
- 1. "Kidnapper" Released: 1977 (Japan only); 2. "Denis" Released: February 1978; 3. "(I'm Always Touched by Your) Presence, Dear" Released: April 1978

Plastic Letters is the second studio album by American rock band Blondie, released in February 1978 by Chrysalis Records. An earlier version with a rearranged track listing was released in Japan in late December 1977.

== Overview ==
This is the second and final Blondie album to be produced by Richard Gottehrer. "Denis", a cover of Randy & the Rainbows' 1963 song "Denise", was successful across Europe, reaching No. 2 in March 1978 in the United Kingdom, and also reached No. 19 in Australia. "(I'm Always Touched by Your) Presence, Dear" was the second single from the album, reaching No. 10 in the UK in May 1978. The song was written by the band's second bassist, Gary Valentine, shortly before he left for a solo career prior to the recording of Plastic Letters; his departure necessitated hiring Frank Infante on a session basis to play bass and rhythm guitar. (Infante would be promoted to being a full member of the band shortly after this album was released.) Blondie member Chris Stein is also credited with playing bass on the album, as well as guitar. During recording Blondie was still signed to their old label, Private Stock Records. The album peaked at No. 10 in the UK and has been certified Platinum by the British Phonographic Industry (BPI). The pink dress Debbie Harry wears in the cover art was designed by Anya Phillips. New friend Joan Jett of the Runaways is thanked on the back cover of the record.

In an interview in 2024, Frank Infante said, “There’s a lot of misinformation out there. If you look on Wikipedia, it says that the band did Plastic Letters as a four-piece and that Chris Stein played guitar and bass. No – I played guitar and bass. I did all the bass." Infante, not yet an official band member at the time of recording, is credited on all issues of the album (as Frank "The Freak" Infante) with rhythm guitar and bass. Stein is credited with lead guitar, bass, e-bow and vibes.

Plastic Letters has been remastered digitally and reissued twice: the first time by Chrysalis Records in 1994 with two bonus tracks, and the second in 2001 by EMI-Capitol with four bonus tracks. The latter issue features the earliest demo of the band's future hit "Heart of Glass", then known as "The Disco Song".

== Critical reception ==
Professional ratings
Review scores
Source	Rating
AllMusic	3.5/5 stars
Christgau's Record Guide	B+
The Encyclopedia of Popular Music	3/5 stars
Entertainment Weekly	A−
Mojo	4/5 stars
Q	4/5 stars
Rolling Stone	4/5 stars
The Rolling Stone Album Guide	3/5 stars
Spin Alternative Record Guide	4/10

The Globe and Mail wrote that "some of Blondie's hardness has been made pliable with curious arrangements and an attempt to make the band seem more formidable than it really is."

== Track listing ==
Side one
No.	Title	Writer(s)	Length
1.	"Fan Mail"	Jimmy Destri	2:35
2.	"Denis"	Neil Levenson	2:15
3.	"Bermuda Triangle Blues (Flight 45)"	Chris Stein	2:45
4.	"Youth Nabbed as Sniper"	Stein	2:56
5.	"Contact in Red Square"	Destri	1:56
6.	"(I'm Always Touched by Your) Presence, Dear"	Gary Valentine	2:40
7.	"I'm on E"	Deborah Harry; Stein	2:13

Side two
No.	Title	Writer(s)	Length
8.	"I Didn't Have the Nerve to Say No"	Harry; Destri	2:50
9.	"Love at the Pier"	Harry	2:24
10.	"No Imagination"	Destri	2:54
11.	"Kidnapper"	Destri	2:34
12.	"Detroit 442"	Destri; Stein	2:24
13.	"Cautious Lip"	Ronnie Toast; Stein	4:21

1994 CD reissue bonus tracks
No.	Title	Writer(s)	Length
14.	"Poets Problem" (B-side to "(I'm Always Touched by Your) Presence, Dear")	Destri	2:20
15.	"Denis" (alternative version)	Levenson	2:22

2001 CD reissue bonus tracks
No.	Title	Writer(s)	Length
14.	"Once I Had a Love (a.k.a. The Disco Song)" (1975 version)	Harry; Stein	3:58
15.	"Scenery" (outtake from Blondie)	Valentine	3:10
16.	"Poets Problem" (B-side to "(I'm Always Touched by Your) Presence, Dear")	Destri	2:20
17.	"Detroit 442" (recorded live 11/06/78 at the Walnut Theatre, Philadelphia, PA)	Destri; Stein	2:33

== Personnel ==
Credits adapted from the liner notes of Plastic Letters.

=== Blondie ===
- Chris Stein – lead guitar, guitar, bass, E-bow on "Youth Nabbed as Sniper", vibes
- Deborah Harry – vocals
- Clement Burke – Premier drums, backing vocals
- James Destri – grand piano, Farfisa organ, Polymoog synthesizer and strings, Roland synthesizer, backing vocals

=== Additional personnel ===
- Richard Gottehrer – production
- Frank "The Freak" Infante – bass, rhythm guitar
- Dale Powers – background vocals on "Kidnapper"
- Rob Freeman – engineering
- Greg Calbi – mastering at Sterling Sound (New York City)
- Phillip Dixon – photographs
- Ramey Communications – art direction, design

== Charts ==
=== Weekly charts ===
Weekly chart performance for Plastic Letters
Chart (1978)	Peak position
Australian Albums (Kent Music Report)	64
Dutch Albums (Album Top 100)	2
New Zealand Albums (RMNZ)	38
Swedish Albums (Sverigetopplistan)	33
UK Albums (OCC)	10
US Billboard 200	72

=== Year-end charts ===
Year-end chart performance for Plastic Letters
Chart (1978)	Position
Dutch Albums (Album Top 100)	18
UK Albums (OCC)	40

== Certifications ==
Certifications for Plastic Letters
Region	Certification	Certified units/sales
Netherlands (NVPI)	Gold	50,000^{^}
United Kingdom (BPI)	Platinum	300,000^{^}
^{^} Shipments figures based on certification alone.
