= Eat to the Beat =

Studio album by Blondie
- Released: September 28, 1979
- Recorded: April–June 1979
- Studios: Electric Lady, Mediasound, Power Station (New York City)
- Genres: New wave; pop
- Length: 43:50
- Label: Chrysalis
- Producer: Mike Chapman

Blondie chronology
Parallel Lines (1978)	Eat to the Beat (1979)	Autoamerican (1980)

Singles from Eat to the Beat
- 1. "Dreaming" Released: September 1979; 2. "Union City Blue" Released: November 1979 (UK); 3. "The Hardest Part" Released: January 1980 (US); 4. "Atomic" Released: February 1980

Eat to the Beat is the fourth studio album by American rock band Blondie, released on September 28, 1979 by Chrysalis Records. The album spent a year on the US Billboard 200, peaking at No. 17 and was one of Billboard's top 10 albums of 1980. It also reached No. 1 on the UK Albums Chart in October 1979, becoming the band's second top album there that year. It has been certified Platinum by the British Phonographic Industry (BPI) and the Recording Industry Association of America (RIAA).

== Musical style ==
The primarily new wave and pop album includes a diverse range of styles in its songs: rock, disco, new wave, punk, reggae and funk, as well as a lullaby. "Atomic" and "The Hardest Part" fused disco with rock. Blondie's first two albums were new wave productions, followed by Parallel Lines which dropped the new wave material, exchanging it entirely for rock-infused pop. Eat to the Beat continued in this pop direction.

== History ==
Three singles were released in the UK from this album ("Dreaming", "Union City Blue" and "Atomic"). "The Hardest Part" was released as the second single from the album in the USA instead of "Union City Blue" (though a remix of "Union City Blue" would be released in the US in 1995). According to the liner notes of the 1994 compilation The Platinum Collection, the song "Slow Motion" was originally planned to be the fourth single release from the album and producer Mike Chapman even made a remix of the track but following the unexpected success of "Call Me", theme song to the movie American Gigolo, these plans were shelved and the single mix of "Slow Motion" remains unreleased. An alternate mix of the track entitled The Stripped Down Motown Mix did however, turn up on one of the many remix singles issued by Chrysalis/EMI in the mid-1990s.

Eat to the Beat was also released as a video album, one of the earliest to be issued. Most of the videos were filmed in and around New York. One of the exceptions was the "Union City Blue" music video, which was filmed at Union Dry Dock, Weehawken, New Jersey. Each video was directed by David Mallet and produced by Paul Flattery. The video was initially available as a promotional VHS in 1979 and subsequently released on videocassette and videodisc in October 1980.

Unlike the rest of Blondie's original albums, Eat to the Beat was not remastered in 1994. It was later digitally remastered and reissued by EMI-Capitol in 2001 with four bonus tracks and candid sleeve notes by Mike Chapman:

They wanted to try anything. And I was right there with them. We also had a title for the album at a very early point, so we had a concept of sorts: Eat to the Beat. I tried to have Debbie explain exactly what it meant to her, but in her normal fashion she simply confused me and I was forced to give it my own interpretation. ... [Drugs] found their way to the studio and presented us with yet another obstacle. The more drugs, the more fights. It was becoming a real mess. ... The music was good but the group was showing signs of wear and tear. The meetings, the drugs, the partying and the arguments had beaten us all up and it was hard to have a positive attitude when the project was finally finished. ... Was this the record the public was waiting for or was it just the waste of seven sick minds? I had never experienced this kind of emotional rollercoaster before and I have never forgotten the sounds, smells and tastes that came with it. I guess that was what they meant: Eat to the Beat.

The 2001 remaster was again reissued in 2007 (June 26 in the USA; 2 July in the UK) without the four bonus tracks. Included instead was a DVD of the long-since deleted Eat to the Beat video album, marking the first time it had been made available on the DVD format.

== Critical reception ==
Professional ratings
Review scores
Source	Rating
AllMusic	3.5/5 stars
Encyclopedia of Popular Music	2/5 stars
Entertainment Weekly	B
Q	4/5 stars
Rolling Stone	N/A
The Rolling Stone Album Guide	3.5/5 stars
Spin Alternative Record Guide	7/10
Uncut	5/5 stars
The Village Voice	A−

Reviewing Eat to the Beat in 1979, Village Voice critic Robert Christgau felt that the record was not "a tour de force" like Blondie's previous album Parallel Lines and expressed reservations about "the overarching fatalism" of its lyrics, but noted that he liked "the way the lyrics depart from pop bohemia to speak directly to the mass audience they're reaching. And Debbie just keeps getting better." Debra Rae Cohen of Rolling Stone found the album "not only ambitious in its range of styles, but also unexpectedly and vibrantly compelling without sacrificing any of the group's urbane, modish humor." A review in People observed that the band sounded "less raw but still fresh." David Hepworth, writing in Smash Hits, praised it as a "brasher, more rocking follow-up... as hard and shiny as glass and I love it." Eat to the Beat was voted the 17th best album of 1979 in The Village Voice's year-end Pazz & Jop critics' poll.

In a retrospective review, William Ruhlmann of AllMusic viewed Eat to the Beat as a "secondhand" version of Parallel Lines, finding that its similar attempts at "rock/disco fusion" were less effective, while "elsewhere, the band just tried to cover too many stylistic bases." In contrast, BBC Music writer Chris Jones opined that Blondie had successfully expanded on the sound of Parallel Lines with Eat to the Beat, which he said "still sounds box fresh today", praising Mike Chapman's production expertise and the album's musical diversity.

== Track listing ==
Side one
No.	Title	Writer(s)	Length
1.	"Dreaming"	Deborah Harry; Chris Stein	3:02
2.	"The Hardest Part"	Harry; Stein	3:37
3.	"Union City Blue"	Harry; Nigel Harrison	3:19
4.	"Shayla"	Stein	3:51
5.	"Eat to the Beat"	Harry; Harrison	2:35
6.	"Accidents Never Happen"	Jimmy Destri	4:10

Side two
No.	Title	Writer(s)	Length
7.	"Die Young Stay Pretty"	Harry; Stein	3:37
8.	"Slow Motion"	Laura Davis; Destri	3:25
9.	"Atomic"	Harry; Destri	4:35
10.	"Sound-A-Sleep"	Harry; Stein	4:12
11.	"Victor"	Harry; Frank Infante	3:19
12.	"Living in the Real World"	Destri	2:38

2001 CD reissue bonus tracks
No.	Title	Writer(s)	Length
13.	"Die Young Stay Pretty" (live BBC 12/31/79, recorded live New Year's Eve '79 at The Apollo Theatre in Glasgow, Scotland)	Harry; Stein	3:27
14.	"Seven Rooms of Gloom" (live BBC 12/31/79, recorded live New Year's Eve '79 at The Apollo Theatre in Glasgow, Scotland)	Holland–Dozier–Holland	2:48
15.	"Heroes" (live 1/12/80 at the Hammersmith Odeon, UK)	David Bowie; Brian Eno	6:19
16.	"Ring of Fire" (live)	June Carter Cash; Merle Kilgore	3:30

=== Video album (12-inch LaserDisc format) ===
1. "Eat to the Beat"
2. "The Hardest Part"
3. "Union City Blue"
4. "Slow Motion"
5. "Shayla"
6. "Die Young Stay Pretty"
7. "Accidents Never Happen"
8. "Atomic"
9. "Living in the Real World"
10. "Sound-A-Sleep"
11. "Victor"
12. "Dreaming"

Bonus videos on side two of videodisc release

1. "Heart of Glass"
2. "Picture This"
3. "(I'm Always Touched by Your) Presence, Dear"
4. "Hanging on the Telephone"

== Personnel ==
Credits adapted from the liner notes of Eat to the Beat.

=== Blondie ===
- Clem Burke – drums
- Jimmy Destri – keyboards, backing vocals on "Die Young Stay Pretty" and "Victor"
- Nigel Harrison – bass guitar
- Deborah Harry – vocals
- Frank Infante – guitars, backing vocals on "Die Young Stay Pretty" and "Victor"
- Chris Stein – guitars

=== Additional musicians ===
- Ellie Greenwich – backing vocals on "Dreaming" and "Atomic"
- Lorna Luft – backing vocals on "Accidents Never Happen" and "Slow Motion"
- Donna Destri – backing vocals on "Living in the Real World"
- Mike Chapman – backing vocals on "Die Young Stay Pretty" and "Victor", count-in vocal on "Living in the Real World"
- Randy Hennes – harmonica on "Eat to the Beat"

=== Technical ===
- Mike Chapman – production
- Dave Tickle – engineering
- Peter Coleman – engineering
- Steve Hall – mastering at MCA Whitney Studios (Glendale, California)
- Kevin Flaherty – production (2001 reissue)

=== Artwork ===
- Norman Seeff – photography, design
- John Van Hamersveld – typography, design
- Billy Bass – art direction

== Charts ==
=== Weekly charts ===
Weekly chart performance for Eat to the Beat
Chart (1979)	Peak position
Australian Albums (Kent Music Report)	9
Austrian Albums (Ö3 Austria)	19
Canada Top Albums/CDs (RPM)	6
Danish Albums	4
Dutch Albums (Album Top 100)	16
Finnish Albums (Suomen virallinen lista)	3
German Albums (Offizielle Top 100)	23
New Zealand Albums (RMNZ)	3
Norwegian Albums (VG-lista)	6
Swedish Albums (Sverigetopplistan)	2
UK Albums (Official Charts)	1
US Billboard 200	17

=== Year-end charts ===
1979 year-end chart performance for Eat to the Beat
Chart (1979)	Position
Australian Albums (Kent Music Report)	63
Canada Top Albums/CDs (RPM)	58
UK Albums (BMRB)	21

1980 year-end chart performance for Eat to the Beat
Chart (1980)	Position
Australian Albums (Kent Music Report)	56
Canada Top Albums/CDs (RPM)	67
UK Albums (BMRB)	40
US Billboard 200	8

== Certifications ==
Certifications for Eat to the Beat
Region	Certification	Certified units/sales
Australia (ARIA)	Platinum	50,000^{^}
Canada (Music Canada)	2× Platinum	200,000^{^}
Denmark (IFPI Danmark)	Gold	50,000^{^}
New Zealand (RMNZ)	Gold	7,500^{^}
United Kingdom (BPI)	Platinum	500,000
United States (RIAA)	Platinum	1,000,000^{^}
^{^} Shipments figures based on certification alone.
