= Jack Lee (musician) =

American songwriter and musician (1952–2023)

- Born: Jack Nathan Lee; March 25, 1952
- Origin: Alaska, United States
- Died: May 26, 2023 (aged 71)
- Occupations: Musician; singer; songwriter
- Instruments: Guitar; vocals
- Years active: 1970s–2020s
- Labels: Maiden America; Lolita; Alive Naturalsound

Jack Lee (March 25, 1952 – May 26, 2023) was an American songwriter and musician best known for composing the songs "Hanging on the Telephone", covered by the new wave band Blondie, "Come Back and Stay", covered by the singer Paul Young, and "You Are My Lover", recorded by Suzi Quatro.

== Early life ==
Born in Alaska in 1952, Lee left home at age 15 for Santa Monica, California, before relocating to San Francisco at age 19. There, he busked in the Fisherman's Wharf neighborhood, where he met fellow street musician Peter Case.

== Career ==
Alongside Case and Paul Collins, Lee formed the seminal, yet short-lived power pop trio the Nerves in 1974. The band self-released one self-titled EP in 1976, which included "Hanging on the Telephone". After relocating to Los Angeles in 1977, the Nerves broke up in 1978.

Lee only recorded two solo albums after the Nerves: 1981's Jack Lee's Greatest Hits, Vol. 1, through his own Maiden America label, and a self-titled album in 1985 on the French label Lolita Records. His songs have been recorded by artists such as Blondie, Paul Young, and Suzi Quatro.

Subsequently, Lee more or less disappeared from the music scene, although he kept performing from time to time with his band Jack Lee Inferno. A proposed album never materialized, but in 2016, Lee's two out-of-print albums from the 1980s were reissued by Alive Naturalsound Records on the compilation Bigger Than Life.

Lee continued to write songs and work on his music in private until his death from colon cancer in Santa Monica, California on May 26, 2023, at the age of 71.

== Discography ==
=== The Nerves ===
- The Nerves (EP) (1976, Maiden America)

=== Solo ===
- Jack Lee's Greatest Hits, Vol. 1 (1981, Maiden America)
- Jack Lee (1985, Lolita)
- Bigger Than Life (2016, Alive Naturalsound) – compilation containing Lee's first two albums

=== Songs recorded by other artists (partial list) ===
Artist	Song	Album	Year
Blondie	"Hanging on the Telephone"	Parallel Lines	1978
Blondie	"Will Anything Happen?"	Parallel Lines	1978
Suzi Quatro	"You Are My Lover"	Suzi ... and Other Four Letter Words	1979
Rubber City Rebels	"Paper Dolls"	Rubber City Rebels	1980
Christie Allen	"City Lights"	Detour	1980
Paul Young	"Come Back and Stay"	No Parlez	1983
Paul Young	"Oh Women"	No Parlez	1983
Paul Young	"Sex"	No Parlez	1983
The Droogs	"Paper Dolls"	Mad Dog Dreams	1989
L7	"Hanging on the Telephone"	The Jerky Boys (Original Motion Picture Soundtrack)	1995
The Kickovers	"Hanging on the Telephone"	Osaka	2002
Peter Bjorn and John	"When You Find Out"	(I Just Wanna) See Through / Say Something Else (split EP)	2003
Def Leppard	"Hanging on the Telephone"	Yeah!	2006
Jimmy Somerville	"Hanging on the Telephone"	Suddenly Last Summer	2009
Chicane	"Come Back"	Giants	2010
Georg Wadenius	"Come Back and Stay"	Reconnection	2010
Kurt Baker	"Hanging on the Telephone"	Got It Covered	2010
The Murderburgers	"When You Find Out"	Old Bullshit, Rare Bullshit, Previously Unreleased Bullshit & Live Bullshit (2007-2013)	2012
Phil Seymour	"Stand Back and Take a Good Look"	Prince of Power Pop – His Very Best + 11 Unissued Tracks	2017
