= Blondie (album) =

Studio album by Blondie
- Released: December 1976
- Recorded: August–September 1976
- Studio: Plaza Sound (New York City)
- Genre: Punk rock
- Length: 32:58
- Label: Private Stock
- Producers: Richard Gottehrer; Craig Leon

Blondie chronology
Blondie (1976)	Plastic Letters (1978)

Singles from Blondie
- 1. "X Offender" Released: June 17, 1976; 2. "In the Flesh" Released: October 1976; 3. "Rip Her to Shreds" Released: November 1977

Blondie is the debut studio album by American rock band Blondie, released in December 1976 by Private Stock Records.

== Overview ==
The first single "X Offender" was originally titled "Sex Offender", but since radio stations would not play a song with such a provocative title, the band renamed the song. After disappointing sales and poor publicity, the band ended their contract with Private Stock and signed with Chrysalis Records in mid-1977. The album was reissued on the Chrysalis label in September 1977, simultaneously with Blondie's second album Plastic Letters, and the single "In the Flesh". Blondie reached No. 14 in Australia, where the band had already had a top-3 entry with "In the Flesh". The album also charted at No. 75 in the UK in early 1979, where the band had become immensely popular.

Through the production of Richard Gottehrer, who had worked with the Angels and other artists of the 1950s and 1960s, much of the music is suffused with the girl group sound of that era. Debbie Harry told an interviewer in 1978 that the band never intended to be retro and when some journalists described them that way, it was "quite a shock". Likewise she rejected any attempt to brand the music as pop, insisting that Blondie played new wave music.

Blondie was first digitally remastered by Chrysalis Records UK in 1994. In 2001, the album was again remastered and reissued, this time along with five bonus tracks. "Out in the Streets" (The Shangri-Las cover), "The Thin Line" and "Platinum Blonde" are three of five tracks from a 1975 demo recorded by Alan Betrock; all five were first issued on the 1994 compilation The Platinum Collection. Bonus track "Platinum Blonde" was the first song that Harry wrote. Original single versions of "X Offender" and "In the Sun" are both sides of Blondie's first single, issued on Private Stock, and are different mixes from the album versions. The two Private Stock versions are both remastered from vinyl.

== Critical reception ==
Professional ratings
Review scores
Source	Rating
AllMusic	4.5/5 stars
Encyclopedia of Popular Music	3/5 stars
Entertainment Weekly	B+
Q	4/5 stars
Rolling Stone	4/5 stars
The Rolling Stone Album Guide	4/5 stars
Sounds	2/5 stars
Spin Alternative Record Guide	7/10
The Village Voice	B+

Reviewing Blondie in 1977 for Rolling Stone, Ken Tucker called the album "a playful exploration of Sixties pop interlarded with trendy nihilism" and found that all the songs "work on at least two levels: as peppy but rough pop, and as distanced, artless avant-rock". He noted that Harry performed with "utter aplomb and involvement throughout: even when she's portraying a character consummately obnoxious and spaced-out, there is a wink of awareness that is comforting and amusing yet never condescending." He also noted that Harry was the "possessor of a bombshell zombie's voice that can sound dreamily seductive and woodenly Mansonite within the same song".

Giovanni Dadomo of Sounds gave the album a two star rating, calling it a "pretty dumb affair" and that "nobody here seems to really be trying very hard.". Dadomo went on to state the production had " an almost totally bland lack of depth and colour" finding the main highlight to be "there's plenty of Farfisa and sometimes Blondie sounds a little bit like Jim Morrison."

In 2020, Rolling Stone included Blondie at number 401 on its list of the 500 greatest albums of all time. And 75th in the list of the 100 Greatest Punk Albums of All Time.

== Track listing ==
Side one
No.	Title	Writer(s)	Length
1.	"X Offender"	Deborah Harry; Gary Valentine	3:11
2.	"Little Girl Lies"	Harry	2:04
3.	"In the Flesh"	Harry; Chris Stein	2:26
4.	"Look Good in Blue"	Jimmy Destri	2:56
5.	"In the Sun"	Stein	2:40
6.	"A Shark in Jets Clothing"	Destri	3:35

Side two
No.	Title	Writer(s)	Length
7.	"Man Overboard"	Harry	3:20
8.	"Rip Her to Shreds"	Harry; Stein	3:20
9.	"Rifle Range"	Stein; Ronnie Toast	3:37
10.	"Kung Fu Girls"	Harry; Valentine; Destri	2:29
11.	"The Attack of the Giant Ants"	Stein	3:20

2001 CD reissue bonus tracks
No.	Title	Writer(s)	Length
12.	"Out in the Streets" (Original Instant Records demo)	Ellie Greenwich; Jeff Barry	2:20
13.	"The Thin Line" (Original Instant Records demo)	Harry; Stein	2:16
14.	"Platinum Blonde" (Original Instant Records demo)	Harry	2:12
15.	"X Offender" (Original Private Stock single version)	Harry; Valentine	3:13
16.	"In the Sun" (Original Private Stock single version)	Stein	2:38

== Personnel ==
Credits adapted from the liner notes of Blondie.

=== Blondie ===
- Deborah Harry – vocals
- Chris Stein – guitars, bass on "X Offender"
- Gary Valentine – bass guitar, guitar on "X Offender"
- Clement Burke – drums, percussion
- Jimmy Destri – Farfisa organ, grand piano, RMI piano, Roland synthesizer

=== Additional personnel ===
- Richard Gottehrer – production
- Rob Freeman – engineering
- Don Hünerberg – engineering assistance
- Greg Calbi – mastering at Sterling Sound (New York City)
- Ellie Greenwich – background vocals on "In the Flesh" and "Man Overboard"
- Micki Harris – background vocals on "In the Flesh" and "Man Overboard"
- Hilda Harris – background vocals on "In the Flesh" and "Man Overboard"
- Marty Thau – cocktail piano on "The Attack of the Giant Ants"
- Craig Leon – co-production ("X Offender", "In the Sun"); remix engineering
- David Perl – art direction, design
- Shig Ikeda – photography
- Alan Betrock – original producer of "Out in the Streets", "The Thin Line" and "Platinum Blonde"
- Kevin Flaherty – production (2001 reissue)

== Charts ==
1977 weekly chart performance for Blondie
Chart (1977)	Peak position
Australian Albums (Kent Music Report)	14

1979 weekly chart performance for Blondie
Chart (1979)	Peak position
UK Albums (Official Charts)	75

== Certifications ==
Certifications for Blondie
Region	Certification	Certified units/sales
United Kingdom (BPI)	Gold	100,000^{^}
^{^} Shipments figures based on certification alone.
