= X Offender =

Single by Blondie

from the album Blondie
- B-side: "In the Sun"
- Released: June 17, 1976
- Recorded: 1976
- Genre: New wave; punk rock
- Length: 3:15
- Label: Private Stock
- Songwriters: Gary Valentine; Deborah Harry
- Producers: Richard Gottehrer; Craig Leon

Blondie singles chronology
| "X Offender" (1976) | "In the Flesh" (1976) |

Audio sample
- file; help

Music video
- "X Offender" on YouTube

"X Offender" is the debut single by American band Blondie. Written by Gary Valentine and Debbie Harry for the band's self-titled debut album, Blondie, the song was released as the album's lead single on Private Stock in June 1976.

== Song information ==
The title of the song was originally "Sex Offender". Bassist Gary Valentine originally wrote the song about an 18-year-old boy being arrested for having sex with his younger girlfriend. Debbie Harry changed the lyrics so that the song was about a prostitute being attracted to the police officer that had arrested her. The track was co-produced by Richard Gottehrer who had worked with 1960s girl group The Angels, and the song is reminiscent of that era in its style.

Private Stock insisted that the name of the single be changed to "X Offender" because they were nervous about the original title. It was released in mid-1976 with the B-side being "In the Sun". While the song did not chart, Chrysalis heard it along with the Blondie album and signed the band. "X Offender" later served as the B-side to "Rip Her to Shreds". Due to limited copies of the single being released and the subsequent popularity of the band, a copy of the original UK Private Stock single "X Offender"/"In the Sun" is a sought-after rarity with copies selling for £50 in collectors' markets since the mixes of both songs on the single are different from those on the Blondie album. These mixes appear as bonus tracks on EMI/Capitol Records' 2001 reissue of the album. No master tapes of the Private Stock versions have been kept in the archives; consequently, these bonus tracks are direct transfers from vinyl.

== Reception ==
Cash Box said that it "is really a good tune, with a driving beat that builds to a fine point of tension," saying that Blondie reminds them of The Tubes.

== Music video ==
Music videos were produced for both "X Offender" and "In the Sun".

== Track listing ==
US 7" (PS-45.097)

1. "X Offender" (single version) (Gary Valentine, Deborah Harry) – 3:15
2. "In the Sun" (single version) (Stein) – 2:38
- There were three pressings of this single that can only be distinguished by careful examination of the inscriptions in the vinyl. First pressing was 7 June 1976; it contains an additional number (pvt 1231 mbw). The third pressing is labeled PVT 1231-M.

US 7" Promo (PS-45.097)

1. X Offender (Stereo Version)
2. X Offender (Mono Version)
- Labeled as a promo PVT 1351 BW. Contains stereo and mono versions on opposite sides.

UK 7" (PVT 90)

1. "X Offender" (Harry, Valentine) – 3:14
2. "In the Sun" (Stein) – 2:30
- X Offender was also released in the UK on the B-Side of the single In the Flesh (PVT 105)
