= Jimmy Destri =

American keyboardist

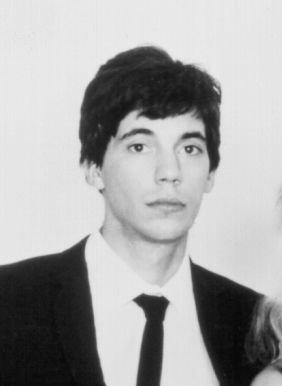
- Destri circa 1978

Background information
- Born: James Mollica Destri; April 13, 1954 (age 72); Brooklyn, New York City, U.S.
- Genres: New wave; pop rock; punk rock; pop
- Occupation: Musician
- Instrument: Keyboards
- Years active: 1973–present
- Formerly of: Blondie
- Website: jimmydestri.com

James Mollica Destri (born April 13, 1954) is an American musician and the original and longest-serving keyboardist for the band Blondie.

== Background ==
Destri is of Italian descent. His father was a novelist who also wrote screenplays and eventually advertising copy to support his family while his mother was a housewife. He has a sister, Donna Destri, who is also a singer and did backing vocals for Blondie and Jimmy's own solo record. Destri grew up in Borough Park, Brooklyn, and was raised in his grandmother's house. His uncle played drums for Joey Dee and the Starlighters. He attended Catholic schools and went to Bishop Ford Central Catholic High School, but dropped out to form his first band. He played keyboards in the rock band Blondie, and was one of the principal songwriters for the band along with Chris Stein and Debbie Harry. He rejoined Blondie in 1997. Destri ceased touring with the band in 2004, but remained an official member for several more years. After he stopped playing with Blondie he worked full time as a drug counselor/therapist at the outpatient recovery center Carnegie Hill Institute in New York City. In April 2020, he went back to practice as a drug counselor/therapist at Seabrook in New Jersey. In 2025, in July, some time after the death of his friend and former bandmate Clem Burke, Destri announced that he was being treated for throat cancer.

== Career ==
Destri became interested in music in the late 1950s and early 1960s due to his uncle's being a drummer with Joey Dee and the Starlighters. He formed his first band, the 86 Proof, in high school and they performed in local schools. He played in a group named Milk and Cookies in the early 1970s, but was dismissed from the band just before they relocated to the UK. He joined Blondie in 1975, using the Farfisa organ as his main instrument.

As Blondie's career progressed, Destri became increasingly interested in synthesizers, and added them with his Farfisa to the overall band's sound. His sister, Donna Destri, sang backing vocals on the 1979 Blondie song "Living in the Real World" and on the album No Exit.

Destri produced Going Up by Joey Wilson for Modern Records, released in October 1980.

As Blondie members took a break from both recording and touring as a group, Destri released the solo album Heart on a Wall in 1981. Heart on a Wall was produced by Michael Kamen, then regarded mainly as a film composer/arranger; Kamen also played keyboards and sang backup vocals. The album also featured numerous renowned musicians, including guitarists Carlos Alomar (David Bowie, Paul McCartney, Mick Jagger, Iggy Pop), Tommy Morrongiello (Bob Dylan, Blue Öyster Cult) and Earl Slick (Bowie, John Lennon, Yoko Ono), along with bassist John Siegler (Todd Rundgren's Utopia). In addition, Blondie's Clem Burke appeared on drums, with guest appearances by fellow Blondie members Chris Stein and Debbie Harry.

Heart on a Wall was released in the US, the UK and France (Chrysalis CHR-1368) as well as Australia and New Zealand (L-37774), West Germany (204 425–320) and the Netherlands (204 425). "Living In Your Heart" backed with "Don't Look Around" was also released as a 7" single in France (PB-8865).

Any digital release of the album remains highly unlikely, as the original master tapes have been lost.

After Blondie's break-up in 1982, Destri ran a company that bought, renovated, and sold old buildings. He also produced and remixed material for artists such as Prince and INXS. Blondie reunited in 1997, and released two further albums (1999's No Exit and 2003's The Curse of Blondie) with Destri as keyboard player. By 2004, Destri retired from touring with the band, but he intended to keep working with them in the studio. However, he played no part in the writing or recording of their next album (2011's Panic of Girls), effectively ending his tenure in the band.

After leaving Blondie, Destri has worked as an alcohol and addictions counselor in New York City. He decided to go into this line of work after recovering from a 25-year cocaine addiction in 2003.

Destri composed or co-wrote several songs for Blondie, including:

- "Look Good in Blue", "A Shark in Jet's Clothing" and "Kung Fu Girls" for debut album Blondie (1976)
- "Fan Mail", "Contact in Red Square", "No Imagination", "Kidnapper", "Detroit 442" and "Poets Problem" for album Plastic Letters (1977)
- "Picture This" and "11:59" for Parallel Lines (1978)
- "Accidents Never Happen", "Slow Motion", "Atomic" and "Living in the Real World" for Eat to the Beat (1979)
- "Angels on the Balcony", "Do the Dark" and "Walk Like Me" for Autoamerican (1980)
- "Danceway" and "(Can I) Find the Right Words (to Say)" for The Hunter (1982)
- "Maria", "Nothing Is Real but the Girl", "No Exit" and "Dig Up the Conjo" for No Exit (1998)
- "Rules for Living", "Background Melody (The Only One)", "Last One in the World" and "Diamond Bridge" for The Curse of Blondie (2003)

In 2012, Destri formed the band Jimmy Destri and the Sound Grenade.
