= Debbie Harry discography =

Deborah Harry discography
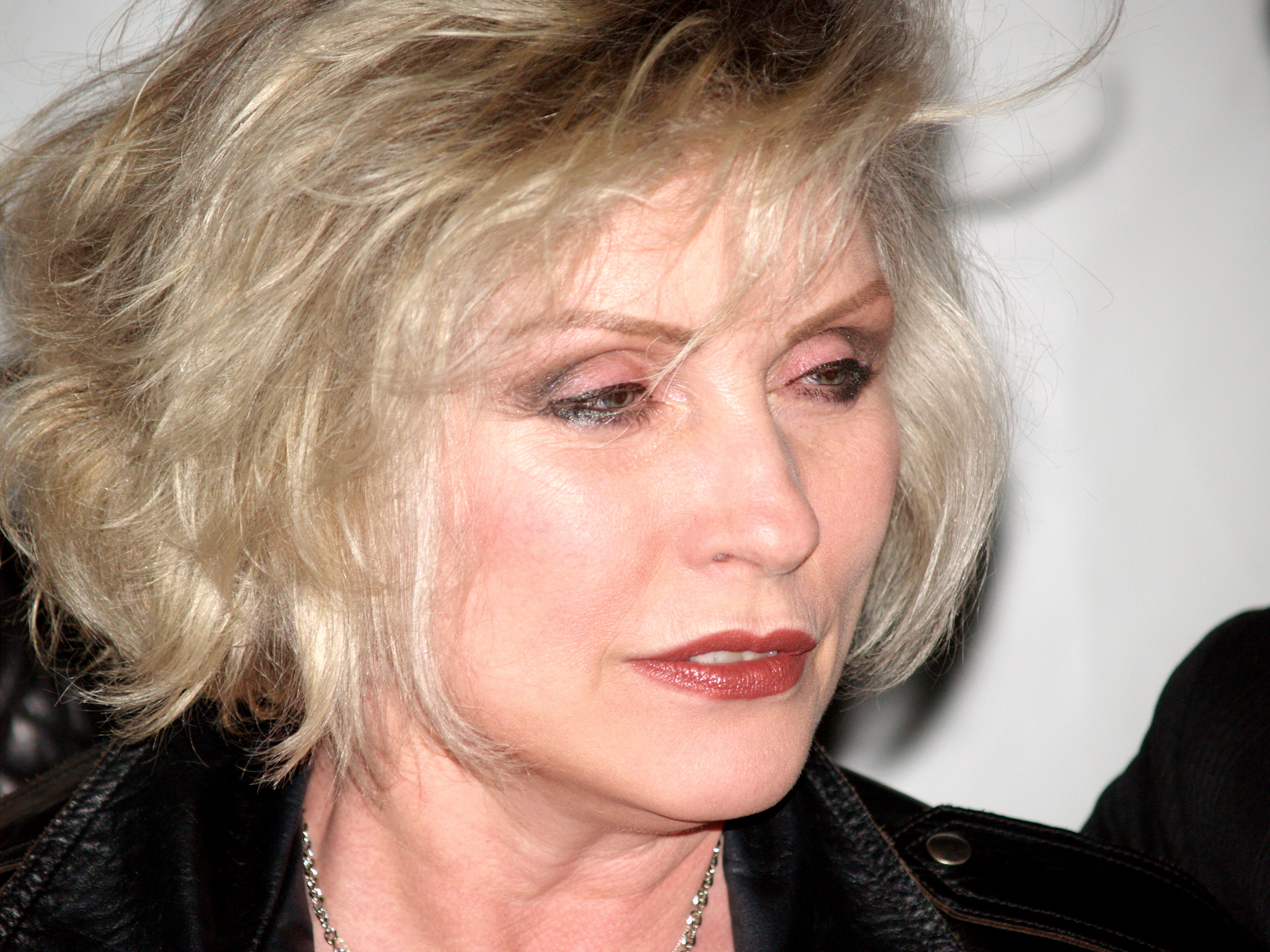
- Harry in April 2008
- Studio albums: 5
- Compilation albums: 4
- Singles: 25
- Music videos: 20

American singer Deborah Harry has released five studio albums, four compilation albums, 25 singles and 20 music videos. Until 1988, Harry used her nickname "Debbie" on all releases but she is now known professionally as Deborah Harry.

== Albums ==
=== Studio albums ===
Title	Details	Peak chart positions								Certifications
Title	Details	US	US Indie	AUS	CAN	NOR	NZ	SWE	UK	Certifications
KooKoo	Released: July 27, 1981; Label: Chrysalis; Formats: CD, cassette, LP	25	—	16	17	24	17	7	6	US: Gold; CAN: Gold; UK: Silver
Rockbird	Released: November 29, 1986; Label: Geffen, Chrysalis; Formats: CD, cassette, LP	97	—	18	—	—	22	30	31	UK: Gold
Def, Dumb & Blonde	Released: October 28, 1989; Label: Sire, Chrysalis; Formats: LP, CD, cassette	123	—	10	—	—	9	—	12	AUS: Gold; UK: Silver
Debravation	Released: August 24, 1993; Label: Sire, Chrysalis; Formats: LP, CD, cassette	—	—	125	—	—	—	—	24	
Necessary Evil	Released: September 15, 2007; Label: Eleven Seven; Formats: CD, digital download	—	37	—	—	—	—	—	86	
"—" denotes releases that did not chart or were not released

=== Compilation albums ===
Title	Details	Peak chart positions					Certifications
Title	Details	US	AUS	NLD	NZ	UK	Certifications
Once More into the Bleach (Debbie Harry and Blondie)	Released: 1988; Label: Chrysalis; Formats: CD, cassette, Double vinyl	—	47	—	—	50	
The Complete Picture: The Very Best of Deborah Harry and Blondie (Deborah Harry and Blondie)	Released: March 1991; Label: Chrysalis; Formats: CD, cassette, Double vinyl	—	6	42	1	3	AUS: Gold; UK: Gold
Deborah Harry Collection	Released: 1998; Label: Disky; Formats: CD	—	—	—	—	—	
Most of All: The Best of Deborah Harry	Released: November 8, 1999; Label: Chrysalis; Formats: CD, cassette	—	—	—	—	—	
"—" denotes releases that did not chart or were not released

=== As featured artist ===
==== Studio albums ====
Title	Details	Peak chart positions
Title	Details	UK Jazz & Blues
Individually Twisted (The Jazz Passengers featuring Deborah Harry)	Released: 1996; Label: 32 Records; Formats: CD, LP	10

==== Live albums ====
Title	Details
"Live" in Spain (The Jazz Passengers featuring Deborah Harry)	Released: 1998; Label: 32 Jazz; Formats: CD, LP

== Singles ==
=== As lead artist ===
Year	Title	Peak chart positions										Album
Year	Title	US	US Dance	US Mod Rock	AUS	BEL	CAN	IRE	NLD	NZ	UK	Album
1981	"Backfired"	43	29	—	23	—	—	—	—	28	32	KooKoo
1981	"The Jam Was Moving"	82	—	—	—	—	—	—	—	—	—	KooKoo
1981	"Chrome"	—	—	—	—	—	—	—	—	—	—	KooKoo
1981	"Jump Jump"	—	—	—	—	—	—	—	—	—	—	KooKoo
1983	"Rush Rush"	— (Note: "Rush Rush" did not enter the Billboard Hot 100, but peaked at number 105 on the Bubbling Under Hot 100 Singles chart.)	28	—	25	—	42	—	—	39	87	Scarface soundtrack
1985	"Feel the Spin"	—	5	—	—	—	—	—	—	—	—	Krush Groove soundtrack
1986	"French Kissin"	57	44	—	4	15	95	8	32	2	8	Rockbird
1987	"In Love with Love"	70	1	—	—	—	—	—	95	—	45	Rockbird
1987	"Free to Fall"	—	—	—	—	—	—	—	—	—	46	Rockbird
1988	"Liar, Liar"	—	—	14	141	—	—	—	—	—	—	Married to the Mob soundtrack
1989	"I Want That Man"	—	—	2	2	48	—	7	—	8	13	Def, Dumb & Blonde
1989	"Kiss It Better"	—	—	12	—	—	—	—	—	—	—	Def, Dumb & Blonde
1989	"Brite Side"	—	—	—	—	—	—	—	—	—	59	Def, Dumb & Blonde
1990	"Sweet and Low"	—	17	—	30	—	—	—	—	—	57	Def, Dumb & Blonde
1990	"Maybe for Sure"	—	—	—	151	—	—	—	—	—	89	Def, Dumb & Blonde
1990	"Well, Did You Evah!" (with Iggy Pop)	—	—	—	106	—	—	29	—	—	42	Red Hot + Blue
1992	"Summertime Blues"	—	—	—	138	—	—	—	—	—	—	That Night soundtrack
1993	"I Can See Clearly"	—	2	—	96	—	—	—	—	—	23	Debravation
1993	"Strike Me Pink"	—	—	—	136	—	—	—	—	—	46	Debravation
1997	"Der Einziger Weg (The Only Way)" (with Robert Jacks)	—	—	—	—	—	—	—	—	—	—	Texas Chainsaw Massacre: The Next Generation soundtrack
1999	"I Want That Man" (Almighty Remix)	—	—	—	86	—	—	—	—	—	—	Most of All: The Best of Deborah Harry
2007	"Two Times Blue"	—	5	—	—	—	—	—	—	—	—	Necessary Evil
2008	"If I Had You"	—	—	—	—	—	—	—	—	—	—	Necessary Evil
2008	"Fit Right In"	—	—	—	—	—	—	—	—	—	—	Non-album single
"—" denotes releases that did not chart or were not released

=== As featured artist ===
Year	Title	Peak chart positions						Album
Year	Title	US Dance	AUT	BEL	NLD	SWI	UK	Album
1997	"Command and Obey" (Groove Thing featuring Debbie Harry)	42	—	—	—	—	—	This Is No Time
1999	"Command and Obey" (Remix) (Groove Thing featuring Debbie Harry)	49	—	—	—	—	—	Non-album single
2006	"New York, New York" (Moby featuring Debbie Harry)	10	47	38	64	80	43	Go – The Very Best of Moby
2019	"#Liftemup" (Greko, Sharon Needles, Debbie Harry, Peppermint & Amanda Lepore)	—	—	—	—	—	—	Non-album single
2023	"Gonna Be You" (with Dolly Parton, Belinda Carlisle, Cyndi Lauper and Gloria Estefan)	—	—	—	—	—	—	80 for Brady (Official Soundtrack Album)
2023	"IWNSLY" (with Nala & The Dandy Warhols)	—	—	—	—	—	—	Non-album single
2024	"Immortal Queen" (with Sia & Chaka Khan)	—	—	—	—	—	—	Non-album single
"—" denotes releases that did not chart or were not released

== Other contributions ==
Year	Song	Album	Album artist	Contribution
1978	—N/a	'Bout Love	Bill Withers	Backing vocals
1981	—N/a	Heart on a Wall	Jimmy Destri	Backing vocals
1987	"Go Lil' Camaro Go"	Halfway to Sanity	Ramones	Backing vocals
1988	"Hairspray" (with Rachel Sweet)	Hairspray soundtrack	Various	Featured vocals
1989	"Invocation to Papa Legba"	Like a Girl, I Want You to Keep Coming	Various	Lead vocals
1989	"Mashed Potato Time"	Standing in the Spotlight	Dee Dee Ramone	Backing vocals
1989	"German Kid"	Standing in the Spotlight	Dee Dee Ramone	Backing vocals
1989	"Sugar Daddy"	Big Trash	Thompson Twins	Backing vocals
1989	"Queen of the USA"	Big Trash	Thompson Twins	Spoken-word telephone vocals
1992	"Prelude to a Kiss"	Prelude to a Kiss soundtrack	Various	Lead vocals
1993	"Moroccan Rock (Pipe of Pain)"	Cash Cow	Various	Lead vocals
1993	"Don't Cross My Mind"	Head On	Die Haut	Lead vocals
1994	"Don't Be Cruel"	Brace Yourself! A Tribute to Otis Blackwell	Various	Lead vocals
1994	"Dog in Sand"	In Love	The Jazz Passengers	Lead vocals
1995	"Strawberry Fields Forever"	Rey Azúcar	Los Fabulosos Cadillacs	Featured vocals
1995	"Estrella de Mar"	Rey Azúcar	Los Fabulosos Cadillacs	Featured vocals
1995	"Winner Take All"	Sengoku Cyber: Fujimaru Jigokuhen	Various	Lead vocals
1996	"No Talking, Just Head"	No Talking, Just Head	The Heads	Lead vocals
1996	"Punk Lolita" (with Johnette Napolitano)	No Talking, Just Head	The Heads	Featured vocals
1997	"More, More, More"	Six Ways to Sunday soundtrack	Various	Lead vocals
1997	"Sex Ed"	Six Ways to Sunday soundtrack	Various	Spoken-word featured vocals
1998	"Ghost Riders in the Sky"	Three Businessmen soundtrack	Various	Lead vocals
1999	"So We Danced Again"	Burnzy's Last Call soundtrack	Various	Lead vocals
2000	"Cups"	Fire at Keaton's Bar & Grill	Roy Nathanson	Lead vocals
2003	"Stormy Weather / Ill Wind" (Medley)	Stormy Weather: The Music of Harold Arlen	Various	Lead vocals
2003	"Uncontrollable Love"	Exploding Plastic Pleasure	Blow-Up	Featured vocals
2003	"Waltzing Matilda"	House Party	Dan Zanes	Featured vocals
2004	"Don't Cha Wanna Know?"	A World of Happiness	Various	Lead vocals
2004	"The Patience Bossa" (with Perry Farrell)	A World of Happiness	Various	Co-lead vocals
2008	"West Coast Smoker"	Folie à Deux	Fall Out Boy	Featured vocals
2010	"Lucky Jim"	The Jeffrey Lee Pierce Sessions Project: We Are Only Riders	Various	Lead vocals
2010	"Free to Walk" (with Nick Cave)	The Jeffrey Lee Pierce Sessions Project: We Are Only Riders	Various	Co-lead vocals
2010	"Think of Me"	Reunited	The Jazz Passengers	Lead vocals
2010	"One Way or Another"	Reunited	The Jazz Passengers	Lead vocals
2010	"In Just Spring"	Caged/Uncaged: A Homage to John Cage	Various	Lead vocals
2010	"This Time That Place"	Spectropia soundtrack	Elliott Sharp	Lead vocals
2011	"Live Alone"	Covers E.P.	Franz Ferdinand	Lead vocals
2012	"The Breaking Hands" (with Nick Cave)	The Jeffrey Lee Pierce Sessions Project: The Journey is Long	Various	Co-lead vocals
2012	"Do it Yourself"	KinderAngst	KinderAngst	Lead vocals
2012	"Safety in Numbers"	Occupy This Album	Various	Lead vocals, writer
2013	"Artificial"	La Revancha del Burro	Systema Solar	Co-lead vocals
2017	"Shadows"	The Far Field	Future Islands	Co-lead vocals
2023	"Heart of Glass"	Rockstar	Dolly Parton	Featured vocals

== Videography ==
=== Music videos ===
Year	Title	Album
1981	"Backfired"	KooKoo
1981	"Now I Know You Know"	KooKoo
1983	"Rush Rush"	Scarface soundtrack
1986	"French Kissin"	Rockbird
1987	"In Love with Love"	Rockbird
1987	"Free to Fall"	Rockbird
1988	"Liar, Liar"	Married to the Mob soundtrack
1989	"I Want That Man"	Def, Dumb & Blonde
1989	"Brite Side"	Def, Dumb & Blonde
1989	"Sweet and Low"	Def, Dumb & Blonde
1990	"Well, Did You Evah!" (with Iggy Pop)	Red Hot + Blue
1992	"Summertime Blues"	That Night soundtrack
1993	"I Can See Clearly"	Debravation
1993	"Strike Me Pink"	Debravation
2007	"Two Times Blue"	Necessary Evil
2007	"If I Had You"	Necessary Evil

=== Collaborations in music videos ===
Year	Title	Other Performer	Album
1989	"Spirit of the Forest"	Spirit of the Forest (various artists)	non-album
1995	"Strawberry Fields Forever"	Los Fabulosos Cadillacs	Rey Azúcar
2004	"The Patience Bossa"	Perry Farrell	A World of Happiness
2006	"New York, New York"	Moby	Go – The Very Best of Moby
