= Most of All: The Best of Deborah Harry =

Greatest hits album by Deborah Harry
- Released: November 8, 1999
- Recorded: 1981–1993
- Genre: Pop
- Length: 75:49
- Label: Chrysalis
- Producer: Various

Deborah Harry chronology
Deborah Harry Collection (1998)	Most of All: The Best of Deborah Harry (1999)	Necessary Evil (2007)

Professional ratings
Review scores
Source	Rating
AllMusic	4/5 stars

Most of All: The Best of Deborah Harry is a compilation album of recordings by American singer Deborah Harry, released by Chrysalis Records in 1999.

The compilation gathers material from Harry's four solo albums for the Chrysalis label, KooKoo, Rockbird, Def, Dumb & Blonde, and Debravation; and unlike 1998's Deborah Harry Collection, it contains most of the singles issued between the years 1981 and 1993, including Harry's biggest solo hits "French Kissin' in the USA" and "I Want That Man". Most of All also includes non-album singles such as "Rush Rush", "Feel the Spin", and her 1990 duet with Iggy Pop, "Well, Did You Evah!", as well alternative single mixes not available on the regular studio albums.

EMI issued remixed dance versions of Harry's 1989 hit "I Want That Man" to promote the album, with the updated mixes by D-Bop and Almighty. Most Of All concludes with two of these mixes.

== Track listing ==
No.	Title	Writer(s)	From the album:	Length
1.	"I Want That Man" (Original)	Tom Bailey, Alannah Currie	Def, Dumb and Blonde	3:42
2.	"French Kissin' in the USA"	Chuck Lorre	Rockbird	5:11
3.	"Brite Side"	Harry, Chris Stein	Def, Dumb and Blonde	4:34
4.	"Sweet and Low" (Phil Harding Single Mix)	Toni C., Harry	Def, Dumb and Blonde	4:22
5.	"Free to Fall" (7" Edit)	Harry, Seth Justman	Rockbird	4:15
6.	"Well, Did You Evah!" (with Iggy Pop)	Cole Porter	Red Hot + Blue Red Hot Organization compilation	3:28
7.	"I Can See Clearly"	Arthur Baker, Tony McIlwaine	Debravation	3:51
8.	"Strike Me Pink"	Jonathan Bernstein, Anne Dudley, Harry	Debravation	4:01
9.	"Communion" (7" Edit)	Harry, Guy Pratt	Debravation	4:27
10.	"Backfired" (7" Edit)	Bernard Edwards, Nile Rodgers	KooKoo	3:36
11.	"In Love with Love" (Stock Aitken Waterman 7" Edit)	Harry, Stein	Rockbird	3:20
12.	"Rush Rush" (Extended Version)	Harry, Giorgio Moroder	Scarface original motion picture soundtrack	4:46
13.	"The Jam Was Moving" (7" Mix)	Edwards, Rodgers	KooKoo	3:00
14.	"Feel the Spin" (Extended Dance Version)	Toni C., Harry, Jellybean	Krush Groove original motion picture soundtrack	6:48
15.	"Maybe for Sure"	Harry, Stein	Def, Dumb and Blonde	4:29
16.	"Rockbird"	Harry, Stein	Rockbird	3:10
17.	"I Want That Man" (Almighty Definitive Mix Radio Edit)	Bailey, Currie	UK, Australian & European CD single	4:04
18.	"I Want That Man" (D-Bop's 11.59 Vocal Mix Radio Edit)	Bailey, Currie	UK, Australian & European CD single	4:01
Total length:				75:49

== Production ==
- Nile Rodgers – producer for Chic Organization Ltd. "Backfired" and "The Jam Was Moving"
- Bernard Edwards – producer for Chic Organization Ltd. "Backfired" and "The Jam Was Moving"
- Giorgio Moroder – producer "Rush Rush"
- John "Jellybean" Benitez – producer "Feel The Spin"
- Seth Justman – producer "French Kissin' In The USA", "In Love With Love" and "Free To Fall"
- Stock Aitken Waterman – additional production and remix "In Love With Love"
- Mike Chapman – producer "Maybe For Sure"
- Tom Bailey (musician) – producer "I Want That Man"
- Eric "E.T." Thorngren – producer "I Want That Man"
- Ben Grosse – additional production and remix "I Want That Man"
- Chris Stein – producer "Brite Side", "Sweet And Low" and "Well Did You Evah!"
- Deborah Harry – producer "Brite Side" and "Sweet And Low"
- Toni C. – producer "Sweet And Low"
- Steve Lillywhite – producer "Well Did You Evah!"
- Phil Harding – additional production and remix "Sweet And Low"
- Arthur Baker – additional production and remix "Brite Side", producer "I Can See Clearly"
- Anne Dudley – producer "Strike Me Pink"
- Guy Pratt – producer "Communion"
- Jon Dixon – additional production and remix "I Want That Man" (Almighty Mix)
- Martyn Norris – additional production and remix "I Want That Man" (Almighty Mix)
- Dave Cross – additional production and remix "I Want That Man" (D-Bop Mix)
- Andy Alder – additional production and remix "I Want That Man" (D-Bop Mix)
- Tony Burch – mastering at Abbey Road Studios
- Dave Cross – compilation and sleeve notes
