= Fit Right In =

Fit Right In may refer to:

- "Fit Right In" (Debbie Harry song), 2008
- "Fit Right In", 2019 song from My Little Pony: Friendship Is Magic
- "Fit Right In", 2021 song from My Little Pony: A New Generation
