= The Wind in the Willows (band) =

1960s American psychedelic folk band

The Wind in the Willows was an American psych folk band, best known for being the first band of Debbie Harry who went on to greater fame with Blondie and as a solo performer. The group took its name from British writer Kenneth Grahame's The Wind in the Willows, a classic of children's literature.

The band's only album, the self-titled The Wind in the Willows (1968) released by Capitol Records, and was a minor commercial success by entering the Billboard Top 200 album chart at #195. The band broke up the following year, disappointed by the commercial and critical reception. Artie Kornfeld, the album's producer, went on to be the music producer of the Woodstock festival in August 1969. Debbie Harry went on to join The Stillettoes in 1973 and other bands until subsequently achieving success fronting the new wave band Blondie, which she co-founded in 1974 with guitarist Chris Stein.

Wind in the Willows recorded a second album in 1969, which remains unreleased. The tapes are with band member Paul Klein's second wife Alice Anne. According to Cathay Che's biography of Harry, the tracks have never surfaced, but Harry was said to have contributed more vocals than on the first album, as well as writing lyrics for a song titled "Buried Treasure". Another song originally slated for the second album, "A Quite Respectable Older Lady", was released by its writer, band member Wayne Kirby, in 2022. In 2024, Kirby released a second unpublished track, "Suzy Snowflake", taken from a tape of several cuts recorded as a demo for A&M Records in 1967.

In a review for Allmusic, musician and critic Cub Koda described the band's first record as mimicking the more successful work of The Mamas and the Papas but "about as lightweight musically as they come", and featuring Harry in a limited role as a backing vocalist.

== The Wind In The Willows ==
Vinyl

During 1968 the album was released by Capitol Records, appearing in the U.S. as a stereo vinyl LP with a "Unipak" gatefold sleeve as catalog no. SKAO-2956 (and on 8-track tape as 8XT-2956). The vinyl LP was also released in mono in the UK and Brazil only, along with stereo versions in those countries and in Canada, Australia, New Zealand, Japan, Germany, South Africa, and the Netherlands.

Compact disc

A mono version of the album on compact disc was issued in 1993 in the UK by Drop Out Records. The album was digitally remastered and released on compact disc in the UK by Edsel Records on 8 March 2000. On 6 March 2007 the original (unremastered) album was reissued on compact disc by Fallout Records in the UK.

== Track listing ==
Side one

1. "Moments Spent" (Paul Klein, Stephen De Phillips) 2:56
2. "Uptown Girl" (Paul Klein, Art Petzal) 2:55
3. "So Sad (To Watch Good Love Go Bad)" (Don Everly) 3:12
4. "My Uncle Used to Love Me But She Died" (Roger Miller) 2:15
5. "There Is But One Truth, Daddy (Reading from Kenneth Grahame's The Wind In The Willows)" (music by Paul Klein) 8:18

Side two

1. "The Friendly Lion" (Paul Klein, Wayne Kirby) 3:18
2. "Park Avenue Blues" (Paul Klein, Stephen De Phillips) 3:45
3. "Djini Judy" (Paul Klein, Wayne Kirby) 2:40
4. "Little People" (Paul Klein, Wayne Kirby) 4:04
5. "She's Fantastic and She's Yours" (Paul Klein, Peter Brittain, Fred Ruvola) 3:43
6. "Wheel of Changes" (Paul Klein, Peter Brittain) 4:30

== Singles ==
Two singles were released:

- Moments Spent (2:55) / Uptown Girl (2:55) – released in the United States, Canada, Italy, New Zealand, Brazil, Australia, and Japan.
- Moments Spent (2:54) / Friendly Lion (3:17) – released in the UK and West Germany.

== Musicians ==
- Wayne Kirby – vocals, double bass, piano, harpsichord, organ, vibes
- Deborah Harry – vocals, acoustic guitar, tamboura, tambourine, finger cymbals
- Ida Andrews – flute, bassoon, piccolo, chimes, vocals
- Peter Brittain – lead guitar, vocals
- Paul Klein – vocals, guitar
- Anton Carysforth – drums
- Steve "Marvello" DePhillips – bass, vocals
- Freddy – spiritual advisor

Assisting breezes:

- Peter C. Leeds – bell tree, "pourer"
- Artie Kornfeld – hairy drums, bongos, "bird", a very big bass drum, "toast-er"

== Production ==
- Producer – Artie Kornfeld
- String arrangements – Wayne Kirby
- Engineer – Brooks Arthur
- Recorded at Century Sound, NYC
- Manager – Peter C. Leeds
- Cover design – Howard Bernstein
