= Sweet and Low (Deborah Harry song) =

Single by Deborah Harry

from the album Def, Dumb & Blonde
- Released: February 1990 (Australia); 19 March 1990 (UK)
- Recorded: 1989
- Genre: Pop
- Length: 4:17
- Label: Sire
- Songwriter(s): Toni C.; Deborah Harry
- Producer(s): Chris Stein; Toni C.; Deborah Harry

Deborah Harry singles chronology
"Brite Side" (1989)	"Sweet and Low" (1990)	"Maybe for Sure" (1990)

Audio sample
- Sweet and Low: file; help

Alternative cover
- UK single sleeve

"Sweet and Low" is a song by American singer Debbie Harry, released as the fourth single from her third solo studio album, Def, Dumb & Blonde (1989). In the UK, it peaked at number 57. "Sweet and Low" also reached number 17 on the US Dance Club Songs chart. In Australia, "Sweet and Low" was the second single released from the album, and was issued as a double A-side with "Kiss It Better", and peaked at number 30. The single version of "Sweet and Low" was remixed by Phil Harding and was later included on Chrysalis Records/EMI's 1999 compilation Most of All: The Best of Deborah Harry. The accompanying music video was directed by designer Stephen Sprouse.

== Critical reception ==
David Giles of Music Week gave a positive review, deemed "Sweet and Low" as Harry's one of her best singles from the parent album, adding: "Aimed squarely at the dancefloor, which creates a plush backdrop for her sugary vocals. There are some great sweeping harmonies and a belter of a chorus – exciting, but still managing to remain laid back". Lisa Tilston of Record Mirror commented that the album version was "really a bit of a drag", but considered the single remix to be "one of Debbie's best". She noted the "icey vocals married to an irresistible dance beat" and added, "The incomparable blonde disco queen sounds, as ever, as if she's singing in an echo chamber and this should do a lot to repair the damage done by her recent dodgier singles."

== Track listing ==
All tracks (Deborah Harry, Chris Stein & Toni C.) unless otherwise noted.

- US cassette
1. "Sweet and Low" (Phil Harding Single Version) – 4:17
2. "Lovelight" (Chris Stein) – 3:55
- US 12-inch
1. "Sweet and Low" (Sweet House Mix) – 7:01
2. "Sweet and Low" (Sweet House Dub) – 6:32
3. "Lovelight" (Chris Stein) – 3:55
4. "Sweet and Low" (Swing Low Mix) – 7:44
5. "Sweet and Low" (Swing Low Dub) – 6:23
6. "Sweet and Low" (Sweet Chariot Mix) – 7:14
- US 12-inch
1. "Sweet and Low" (Phil Harding 12" Mix)
2. "Sweet and Low" (Phil Harding Dub)
3. "Lovelight" (LP Version)
4. "Sweet and Low" (Sweet House Mix)
5. "Sweet and Low" (Sweet House Dub)
6. "Sweet and Low" (Swing Low Mix)
- US CD
1. "Sweet and Low" (Swing Low Mix) – 7:44
2. "Sweet and Low" (Sweet Chariot Mix) – 7:14
3. "Lovelight" (Chris Stein) – 3:55
4. "Sweet and Low" (Sweet House Mix) – 7:01
- US CD
1. "Sweet and Low" (Single Version)
2. "Sweet and Low" (LP Edit)
3. "Sweet and Low" (Phil Harding 12" Mix)
4. "Lovelight" (LP Version)
5. "Sweet and Low" (Sweet House Mix)
6. "Sweet and Low" (Swing Low Mix)
- UK 7-inch, poster sleeve 7-inch and cassette
1. "Sweet and Low" (Phil Harding 7" Mix) – 3:46
2. "Lovelight" (Chris Stein) – 3:55
- UK 12-inch and 12-inch picture disc
1. "Sweet and Low" (Phil Harding Remix) – 6:45
2. "Sweet and Low" (Phil Harding Dub) – 4:51
3. "Sweet and Low" (Phil Harding 7" Mix) – 3:46
- UK CD
1. "Sweet and Low" (Phil Harding Radio Edit) – 3:30
2. "Sweet and Low" (Phil Harding Dub) – 4:51
3. "Sweet and Low" (Phil Harding Single Version) – 4:17

== Charts ==
Chart performance for "Sweet and Low"
Chart (1990)	Peak position
Australia (ARIA)	30
UK Singles (OCC)	57
US Dance Club Songs (Billboard)	17
