= Kiss It Better (disambiguation) =

"Kiss It Better" is a 2016 song by Rihanna.

Kiss It Better may also refer to:

- "Kiss It Better" (Deborah Harry song) (1989)
- "Kiss It Better", a song by M People from Northern Soul
- "Kiss It Better", a song by Spooky Tooth from Cross Purpose
- "Kiss It Better", a song by Jeffree Star
