= John Garrison =

John Garrison may refer to:

- John Garrison (author), American author and scholar
- John Garrison (ice hockey) (1909–1988), American ice hockey player
- John Garrison (musician) (1973), English musician
- John Garrison, known as Liver-Eating Johnson, mountain man of the American West
- John Garrison (assemblyman), member of the 56th New York State Legislature in 1833

== See also ==
- Jon Garrison, tenor
