= Deborah Harry Collection =

- Original release

Compilation album by Deborah Harry
- Released: 1998/2004
- Recorded: 1981–1993
- Genre: Pop
- Length: 63:04
- Label: Disky Communications (Netherlands); EMI UK (reissue)
- Producer: Various

Deborah Harry chronology
Debravation (1993)	Deborah Harry Collection (1998)	Most of All: The Best of Deborah Harry (1999)

Professional ratings
Review scores
Source	Rating
Allmusic	2/5 stars

Deborah Harry Collection is a compilation album of recordings by Deborah Harry, released by Dutch budget price label Disky Communications in 1998.

Deborah Harry Collection was re-issued with new artwork by EMI's mid-price label EMI Gold under the title French Kissin' - The Collection in 2004.

== Track listing ==
No.	Title	Writer(s)	Originally included in	Length
1.	"French Kissin in the USA"	Chuck Lorre	Rockbird (1986)	5:14
2.	"Surrender"	Bernard Edwards, Nile Rodgers	KooKoo (1981)	3:37
3.	"Inner City Spillover"	Deborah Harry, Chris Stein	KooKoo (1981)	4:59
4.	"Backfired"	Edwards, Rodgers	KooKoo (1981)	4:53
5.	"Stability"	Harry, Stein, Franne Golde, Allee Willis	Debravation (1993)	4:59
6.	"I'll Never Fall in Love"	Walter Ward, Thomas Bush	Def, Dumb and Blonde (1989)	3:19
7.	"Communion"	Harry, Guy Pratt	Debravation (1993)	6:36
8.	"Mood Ring"	Harry, Stein	Debravation (1993)	4:30
9.	"The Fugitive"	Harry, Stein	Debravation (1993)	4:54
10.	"Chrome"	Harry, Stein	KooKoo (1981)	4:16
11.	"The Jam Was Moving"	Edwards, Rodgers	KooKoo (1981)	3:00
12.	"Feel the Spin"	John "Jellybean" Benitez, Toni C., Harry	Krush Groove soundtrack (1985)	6:49
13.	"Rockbird"	Harry, Stein	Rockbird (1986)	3:11
14.	"Bike Boy"	Harry, Stein	Def, Dumb and Blonde (1989)	2:47
