= I Want That Man =

1989 single by Debbie Harry

Single by Deborah Harry

from the album Def, Dumb & Blonde
- B-side: "Bike Boy"
- Released: September 25, 1989
- Genre: Synth-rock
- Length: 3:41
- Label: Sire; Reprise; Red Eye
- Songwriters: Alannah Currie; Tom Bailey
- Producers: Tom Bailey; Eric "E.T." Thorngren

Deborah Harry singles chronology
"Liar, Liar" (1988)	"I Want That Man" (1989)	"Kiss It Better" (1989)
"Strike Me Pink" (1993)	"I Want That Man (Remix)" (1999)	"New York, New York" (2006)

Audio sample
- I Want That Man: file; help

Alternative cover
- UK and Australian single sleeve.

"I Want That Man" is a song by American singer Deborah Harry. The song was released as the lead single from her third solo album, Def, Dumb & Blonde, and was the first record Harry released in which she reverted to using Deborah as her name instead of Debbie. "I Want That Man" became a hit in several countries, reaching number two in Australia and on the US Billboard Modern Rock Tracks chart. It also became a top-20 hit in Ireland, New Zealand, and the United Kingdom.

== Song information ==
The track was written by Thompson Twins members Alannah Currie and Tom Bailey and was produced by Bailey and Eric Thorngren. It became one of the most successful singles in Deborah Harry's solo career, peaking at number two in Australia, number seven in Ireland, number eight in New Zealand, number 13 in the United Kingdom, and number two on the Billboard Modern Rock Tracks chart in the United States. The video was directed by Mary Lambert.

The song commences with the lyric, "I want to dance with Harry Dean," a reference to the actor Harry Dean Stanton, about whom Currie and Harry "shared a long-standing fascination." Harry and Currie subsequently met Stanton backstage after "both swooning like teenage girls" watching him sit in with Ry Cooder singing "Across the Borderline" and resulting in Harry and Stanton entering into a short-term relationship.

A disco version of the song was used in the Australian film Strange Bedfellows. In late 1999, the song was included on the EMI compilation Most of All: The Best of Deborah Harry and also reissued as a remix single that charted on the Australian Singles Chart at number 86 in February 2000. The single's B-side, "Bike Boy", appears as a bonus track on the CD and cassette editions of Def, Dumb & Blonde.

== Track listings ==
"I Want That Man" was written by Tom Bailey and Alannah Currie. "Bike Boy" was written by Deborah Harry and Chris Stein.

=== Original version ===
US and Australian 7-inch and cassette single

1. "I Want That Man" (LP version) – 3:41
2. "Bike Boy" (CD/cassette version) – 2:45

US 12-inch single

A1. "I Want That Man" (12-inch remix) – 6:26
A2. "I Want That Man" (instrumental) – 6:54
B1. "Bike Boy" – 2:45
B2. "I Want That Man" (remix / edit) – 4:03

US CD single

1. "I Want That Man" (12-inch remix) – 6:26
2. "I Want That Man" (remix / edit) – 4:03
3. "Bike Boy" – 2:45
4. "I Want That Man" (instrumental) – 6:54

UK 7-inch and cassette single

1. "I Want That Man" (remix)
2. "Bike Boy"
- A 7-inch poster bag sleeve with the same track listing was also issued.

UK and Australian 12-inch single, UK CD single

A1. "I Want That Man" (12-inch remix)
A2. "I Want That Man" (7-inch version)
B1. "I Want That Man" (instrumental)
B2. "Bike Boy"

- A 12-inch picture disc with the same track listing was also issued.

=== 1999 remix ===
UK and Australian CD single

1. "I Want That Man" (Almighty Definitive mix radio edit)
2. "I Want That Man" (Almighty Definitive mix)
3. "I Want That Man" (D-Bop 11.59 vocal mix)

European CD single

1. "I Want That Man" (Almighty Definitive mix radio edit)
2. "I Want That Man" (Almighty Definitive mix)

== Charts ==
=== Weekly charts ===
1989–1990 weekly chart performance for "I Want That Man"
Chart (1989–1990)	Peak position
Australia (ARIA)	2
Belgium (Ultratop 50 Flanders)	48
Europe (Eurochart Hot 100 Singles)	35
Ireland (IRMA)	7
Italy Airplay (Music & Media)	5
New Zealand (Recorded Music NZ)	8
UK Singles (OCC)	13
US Alternative Airplay (Billboard)	2

2000 weekly chart performance for "I Want That Man"
Chart (2000)	Peak position
Australia (ARIA)	86

=== Year-end charts ===
Year-end chart performance for "I Want That Man"
Chart (1990)	Position
Australia (ARIA)	37

== Certifications ==
Certifications and sales for "I Want That Man"
Region	Certification	Certified units/sales
Australia (ARIA)	Platinum	70,000^{^}
^{^} Shipments figures based on certification alone.
