= Heart on a Wall =

Studio album by Jimmy Destri
- Released: December 1981
- Recorded: 1981
- Studio: The Hit Factory, New York City
- Genre: New wave
- Length: 39:04
- Label: Chrysalis
- Producer: Michael Kamen

Heart on a Wall is a solo album by Blondie keyboardist and composer Jimmy Destri, released on Chrysalis Records in 1981. It remains unreleased on compact disc.

== Overview ==
After Blondie's 1980 album Autoamerican, the band members took a break from both recording and touring as a group. The band's three principal songwriters, Deborah Harry, Chris Stein and Jimmy Destri instead recorded two solo projects: Harry, together with Stein, recording her debut solo album KooKoo with Chic's Bernard Edwards and Nile Rodgers, and Destri his first solo album.

Heart on a Wall was produced by Michael Kamen, then regarded mainly as a film composer/arranger; Kamen also played keyboards and sang backup vocals. The album also featured numerous renowned musicians, including guitarists Carlos Alomar (David Bowie, Paul McCartney, Mick Jagger, Iggy Pop), Tommy Morrongiello (Bob Dylan, Blue Öyster Cult, Ian Hunter) and Earl Slick (Bowie, John Lennon, Yoko Ono), along with bassist John Siegler (Todd Rundgren's Utopia). In addition, the album features contributions from his Blondie bandmates, with Clem Burke providing drums, and Chris Stein and Debbie Harry performing in "guest appearance" roles. Destri himself, not limiting himself to his trademark keyboards, also performs guitar on the album.

Heart on a Wall was released in the US, the UK and France (Chrysalis CHR-1368) as well as Australia and New Zealand (L-37774), West Germany (204 425-320) and the Netherlands (204 425). "Living In Your Heart" backed with "Don't Look Around" was also released as a 7" single in France (PB-8865).

Any digital release of the album remains highly unlikely since the original master tapes have been lost.

== Track listing ==
All tracks written by Jimmy Destri

Side A:

1. "Bad Dreams" – 3:21
2. "Don't Look Around" – 4:35
3. "Living in Your Heart" – 5:01
4. "My Little World" – 5:47

Side B:

1. "Little Metal Drummer" - 4:19
2. "Numbers Don't Count (On Me)" - 3:34
3. "The King of Steam" - 4:20
4. "Under the Ice" - 4:07
5. "Heart on a Wall" - 2:43

== Personnel ==
- Jimmy Destri - vocals, keyboards, guitar, backing vocals
- Clem Burke - drums
- Tommy Morrongiello - left guitar
- Earl Slick - center guitar
- Carlos Alomar - right guitar, backing vocals
- John Siegler - bass
- Michael Kamen - keyboards, backing vocals
- Chris Stein - harmonica, lead guitar on "Little Metal Drummer"
- Donna Destri - backing vocals
- Debbie Harry - backing vocals
- Sasha Kamen - backing vocals
- Joey Wilson - backing vocals

== Production ==
- Michael Kamen - producer for Mother Fortune Inc.
- Recorded in New York at The Hit Factory
- Mixed by Jimmy Destri and Robert Clifford with John Davenport and Jon Smith
- Mastered at Sterling Sound by Greg Calbi
- Art direction and photography by Lynn Goldsmith
- Logistics: Ace Penna
- Production assistance: Susan Kaplow
- Bullpen: Bert Padell, Bob Emmer, Marty Silfen, Eddie Germano, Bill George, Brendan and Jeff
- Originally released as Chrysalis CHR 1368

== Chart Peaks ==
Year	Country	Position
1981	United States	#201
