= Maybe for Sure =

Single by Deborah Harry

from the album Def, Dumb & Blonde
- Released: May 1990 (UK)
- Recorded: 1989
- Genre: Pop
- Label: Chrysalis
- Songwriters: Debbie Harry; Chris Stein
- Producer: Mike Chapman

Deborah Harry singles chronology
"Sweet and Low" (1990)	"Maybe for Sure" (1990)	"Well, Did You Evah!" (1991)

Audio sample
- Maybe For Sure: file; help

"Maybe for Sure" is a 1989 song by the American singer Debbie Harry, released as a single from her third solo album Def, Dumb & Blonde.

== Song information ==
"Maybe For Sure" was written during Harry's time with the band Blondie. Despite being produced by Blondie's producer Mike Chapman, the single was not a success, peaking at number 89 in the UK and was not released at all in the US.

The song itself is a reworked version of the song "Angel's Song", from the 1983 animated film Rock & Rule, which was written by Debbie Harry and Chris Stein. A remixed version of the track called the "Tunguska Event 7" mix" was later featured on the US charity album Just Say Da (Volume IV Of Just Say Yes).

== Track listing ==
All tracks written by Deborah Harry & Chris Stein.

UK 7", 7" Picture Disc & Cassette

1. "Maybe for Sure" – 4:10 (remixed by Pascal Gabriel)
2. "Get Your Way" – 6:11

UK 12"

1. "Maybe for Sure (12" Mix)" – 5:04 (remixed by Pascal Gabriel)
2. "Get Your Way" – 6:11
3. "End of the Run" – 7:03

UK CD

1. "Maybe for Sure" – 4:10 (remixed by Pascal Gabriel)
2. "Get Your Way" – 6:11
3. "End of the Run" – 7:03

== Charts ==
Chart performance for "Maybe for Sure"
Chart (1990)	Peak position
Australia (ARIA)	151
UK Singles (Official Charts)	89
