= Debravation =

Studio album by Deborah Harry
- Released: July 19, 1993
- Genre: Pop rock
- Length: 53:56
- Labels: Sire/Reprise (US); Chrysalis (UK)
- Producers: Chris Stein; Toni C.; Arthur Baker; Adam Yellin; Anne Dudley; Jon Astley; Guy Pratt; John Williams

Deborah Harry chronology
The Complete Picture: The Very Best of Deborah Harry and Blondie (1989)	Debravation (1993)	Deborah Harry Collection (1998)

Singles from Debravation
- 1. "I Can See Clearly" Released: June 21, 1993; 2. "Strike Me Pink" Released: 1993

Professional ratings
Review scores
Source	Rating
AllMusic	3/5 stars
Robert Christgau	(neither)
Music Week	3/5 stars
NME	5/10
Philadelphia Inquirer	2/4 stars
Rolling Stone	2/5 stars
Select	1/5 stars

Debravation is the fourth solo album by American singer Deborah Harry, released on July 19, 1993.

It was the final album Harry made whilst signed to the Chrysalis label, thus ending a partnership that began with her time as a member of Blondie in the '70's and had endured for over 15 years.

== Background ==
Speaking of the album, Harry told Melody Maker in 1993, "The album I originally wanted to make was quite different from the one that came out in the end. There were lots of people involved in producing and arranging it and it became perhaps a bit too polished. It was supposed to be a lot more raw. It's come out kind of interesting, though."

== Critical reception ==
In the UK, Chris Roberts of Melody Maker considered Debravation to be a "sensible attempt to consolidate fields ploughed" by Harry's previous album Def, Dumb & Blonde (1989), but also noted the lack of cohesion, calling it "something of a Jill of all trades – rock, pop, dance, rap etc". He felt the album's "great moments" were "as good as anything in the history of pop" and selected "Communion" as the album's "zenith", noting it boasts the "most irresistible chorus" since the Bee Gees' "Tragedy". He also praised "Stability", calling it the "Nineties kid sister" to Blondie's "Rapture", and "Strike Me Pink", with its "hovering 'Brite Side' haze". Stephen Dalton of NME described the album as a "saddening affair" on which Harry "too often seems to be imitating her imitators". He felt it is "poorly stocked with effortless techno gliders" such as the "svelte" "Lip Service" and "top-heavy with rock-funk chuggers" like the "middling, could-do-better first single", "I Can See Clearly". He noted that the "sweet pop-rap confection" "Stability" recalls Blondie's "Rapture", but added that the song, along with "a handful of New Wave guitar gushers" are "all stamped with a desperate longing for past glory", and that "even potentially oddball experiments like the William Gibson collaboration ["Dog Star Girl"] sound graceless and mechanical".

== Track listing ==
No.	Title	Writer(s)	Producer(s)	Length
1.	"I Can See Clearly"	Arthur Baker, Tony McIlwaine	Arthur Baker	3:52
2.	"Stability"	Deborah Harry, Chris Stein, Franne Golde, Allee Willis	Chris Stein	4:59
3.	"Strike Me Pink"	Harry, Anne Dudley, Johnathan Bernstein	Anne Dudley	4:02
4.	"Rain"	Leigh Foxx	Jon Astley, Stein	4:13
5.	"Communion"	Harry, Guy Pratt	Guy Pratt	6:35
6.	"Lip Service"	Harry, Toni C.	Toni C.	3:32
7.	"Mood Ring"	Harry, Stein	Dudley	4:30
8.	"Keep On Going"	Astley	Astley	4:16
9.	"Dancing Down the Moon"	Harry, Stein	Stein	3:10
10.	"Standing In My Way"	Harry, Foxx	John Williams	4:10
11.	"The Fugitive"	Harry, Stein	Stein	4:55
12.	"Dog Star Girl"	Stein, William Gibson	Stein	5:34
Total length:				53:56

Bonus tracks on the US CD release
No.	Title	Writer(s)	Producer(s)	Length
13.	"My Last Date (With You)"	Boudleaux Bryant, Floyd Cramer, Skeeter Davis	R.E.M., Andy Paley	2:57
14.	"Tear Drops"	Calhoun, Golden	Andy Paley	2:27
Total length:				59:20

== Personnel ==
- Deborah Harry – vocals
- Chris Stein – guitar, programming
- Guy Pratt – guitar, keyboards, drum programming
- Pete Min – guitar
- Tim Renwick – guitar
- Stuart Kimball – guitar
- Mike Hehir – guitar
- J.J. Belle – guitar
- Chester Kaymen – guitar
- Danny Wilensky – saxophone
- Phil Todd – saxophone
- Andy Paley – piano, drums, background vocals
- Steve Piggott – keyboards
- Danny Schogger – keyboards
- Anne Dudley – keyboards
- Jon Astley – keyboards
- Carrie Boothe – keyboards, background vocals
- Tony McIlwaine – keyboards, programming
- Arthur Baker – keyboards, programming
- Nikolai Vorkapich – keyboards, programming
- Lenny Dee – keyboards, programming
- Eric Kupper – keyboards, programming
- Steve Rimland – keyboards, programming
- Richard T. Norris – keyboards, programming
- Toni C. (Antoinette Colandero) – keyboards, programming
- Leigh Foxx – bass guitar
- Andy Pask – bass
- Steve Barnacle – bass
- Geoff Dugmore – drums
- Jeffery CJ Vanston – synthesizer drums
- Frank Ricotti – percussion
- Ian Wilson – background vocals
- Tessa Niles – background vocals
- Linda Taylor – background vocals
- Katie Kissoon – background vocals
- Andy Caine – background vocals
- John Williams – background vocals
- Jonathon Paley – background vocals
- R.E.M. – performance on "My Last Date with You"

=== Production ===
- Arthur Baker – producer on "I Can See Clearly"
- Chris Stein – producer on "Stability", "Rain", "Dancing Down the Moon", "The Fugitive" and "Dog Star Girl",
- Anne Dudley – producer on "Strike Me Pink" and "Mood Ring"
- Jon Astley – producer on "Rain" and "Keep On Going"
- Guy Pratt – producer on "Communion"
- Adam Yellin – producer/recording engineer/mixing engineer
- Toni C. – producer on "Lip Service"
- John Williams – producer on "Standing In My Way"
- R.E.M. – producers on "My Last Date With You"
- Andy Paley – producer on "My Last Date With You", "Tear Drops"
- Chris Lord-Alge – additional production and mixing on "Communion"
- Kennan Keating – sound engineer
- Louis Scalise – sound engineer
- Andy Cardenas – sound engineer
- Neil McLellan – sound engineer
- Mike O'Hora – sound engineer
- Roger Dudley – sound engineer
- Glenn Skinner – sound engineer
- Bill Esses – sound engineer
- Darrin Tidsey – sound engineer
- Geoff Foster – sound engineer
- Rich Travali – sound engineer
- Dean Chamberlain – art direction, photography
- Gary Kurfirst – art direction, management

== Charts ==
Chart (1993)	Peak position
Australian (Kent Music Report)	125
UK Albums (Official Charts)	24

== Debravation Producer's Cut ==
In 1994, Harry released independently a different version of the album, entitled Debravation (8½) Producer's (Director's) Cut. According to her official website, this was the original version of the album, which was presented to Sire and rejected. When they opted for a different track listing and different mixes, Harry had a limited number of copies of Debravation (8½) Producer's (Director's) Cut pressed and sold them at her concerts and through her website.

The contained two identical tracks to the official release ("Dog Star Girl" and "The Fugitive"), three b-sides ("8½ Rhumba", alternative version of "Standing in My Way" and "On a Breath"), four alternative versions of song form original Debravation album and two previously unreleased tracks.

No.	Title	Writer(s)	Notes	Length
1.	"8½ Rhumba"	Nino Rota	b-side to "Strike me Pink"
2.	"Rain"	Leigh Foxx	alternative version
3.	"Dog Star Girl"	Chris Stein, William Gibson	from Debravation
4.	"Stability"	Deborah Harry, Stein, Franne Golde, Allee Willis	alternative version
5.	"Standing in My Way"	Harry, Foxx	alternative version, b-side to "I Can See Clearly"
6.	"Dancing Down the Moon"	Harry, Stein	alternative version
7.	"Black Dog" (live at the Hammersmith Odeon, London, July 23, 1991)	Jimmy Page, Robert Plant, John Paul Jones	previously unreleased
8.	"Mood Ring"	Harry, Stein	alternative version
9.	"The Fugitive"	Harry, Stein	from Debravation
10.	"The Date"	Harry, Stein	previously unreleased
11.	"On a Breath"	Foxx	b-side to "Strike me Pink"

=== Personnel ===
- Chris Stein — guitar, programming, production
- Pete Min — guitar
- Leigh Foxx — bass
- Geoff Dugmore — drums
- Joey Ramone — vocals on "Standing in My Way"
- Steve Barnacle — bass on the live version of "Black Dog"
- Carrie Boothe — keyboards on the live version of "Black Dog"
- Geoff Dugmore — drums on the live version of "Black Dog"
- Karl Hyde — guitar on the live version of "Black Dog"
- Melissa Poole-Stein — backing vocals on the live version of "Black Dog"
- Adam Yellin — engineer
