= Red Hot + Blue =

Compilation album by various artists
- Released: September 25, 1990
- Genres: Pop; rock
- Length: 77:03
- Label: Chrysalis
- Producers: Leigh Blake; John Carlin; Steve Lillywhite

Red Hot Benefit series chronology
Red Hot + Blue (1990)	Red Hot + Dance (1992)

Alternative cover
- 2006 CD/DVD re-issue

Red Hot + Blue is the first compilation album from the Red Hot Organization in the Red Hot Benefit Series. It features contemporary pop performers reinterpreting several songs by Cole Porter, with the album title based on Porter's musical Red, Hot and Blue.

Released in September 1990, the album sold over a million copies worldwide, raised nearly $1m for the activist group ACT UP, and was heralded as one of the first major AIDS benefits in the music business. The accompanying ABC television special featured music videos for the songs. Each performer contributed their own unique interpretation to their selection, expanding the premise popularized by Ella Fitzgerald in her 1956 Cole Porter tribute album.

Red Hot + Blue was reissued as a two-disc set in 2006, including the original CD remastered, and a DVD of the video collection. Bloomsbury Publishing released a 2024 memoir by John S. Garrison that blends together the history of the album with his personal experience of listening to Red Hot + Blue as part of the publisher's 33⅓ book series.

== Singles and promotion ==
Besides the television special, some of the songs were promoted as singles. Neneh Cherry's reworked version of "I've Got You Under My Skin" was released as the lead single for the album in the UK and Europe and reached No. 25 on the UK Singles Chart. "Well, Did You Evah!" by Deborah Harry and Iggy Pop received a commercial release in Europe and Australia and reached No. 42 on the UK Singles Chart, No. 18 in Ireland and No. 106 in Australia.

Although no singles were released from the album in the United States, the song "Who Wants to Be a Millionaire?", covered in a techno style by Thompson Twins, received regular airplay on San Francisco's Live 105 (KITS). This was one of the two songs not to have a video counterpart. U2's cover of "Night and Day" reached No. 2 on the Modern Rock Tracks chart, and presaged the electronic sound the band would explore on Achtung Baby the following year.

Singer-songwriter Tom Waits asked his friend Jim Jarmusch to direct a video of his version of "It's All Right with Me". As a preliminary test, Jarmusch captured black & white footage around Los Angeles with a handheld 8 mm film camera, and filmed Waits dancing and singing the song. Waits was unexpectedly unavailable for further photography, so Waits suggested Jarmusch should complete the video using only the test material.

Annie Lennox reprised her performance of "Ev'ry Time We Say Goodbye" in Derek Jarman's 1991 film Edward II.

== Critical reception ==
Professional ratings
Review scores
Source	Rating
AllMusic	3.5/5 stars
Calgary Herald	A
NME	5/10
Orlando Sentinel	3/5 stars
Record Mirror	5/5 stars
The Vancouver Sun	4/5 stars

In a review of Red Hot + Blue for AllMusic, William Ruhlmann singled out Neneh Cherry's "I've Got U Under My Skin" and the Jungle Brothers' "I Get a Kick Out of You" as "the most radical reinterpretations" of Cole Porter's original songs, though he went on to comment that "there are tracks in which the artists have taken the opposite tack, going for re-creations of styles from decades past." Ruhlmann concluded the review by stating that "Like most various-artists albums and most tribute albums, this one is wildly uneven; like most charity albums, it's in the service of a good cause."

== Track listing ==
All tracks are written by Cole Porter.

No.	Title	Video directed by	Length
1.	"I've Got U Under My Skin" (performed by Neneh Cherry)	Jean-Baptiste Mondino	4:28
2.	"In the Still of the Night" (performed by The Neville Brothers)	Jonathan Demme	5:18
3.	"You Do Something to Me" (performed by Sinéad O'Connor)	John Maybury	2:34
4.	"Begin the Beguine" (performed by Salif Keita)	Zak Ove	3:22
5.	"Love for Sale" (performed by Fine Young Cannibals)		2:49
6.	"Well, Did You Evah!" (performed by Deborah Harry + Iggy Pop)	Alex Cox	3:28
7.	"Miss Otis Regrets / Just One of Those Things" (performed by The Pogues + Kirsty MacColl)	Neil Jordan	4:40
8.	"Don't Fence Me In" (performed by David Byrne)	David Byrne	3:09
9.	"It's All Right with Me" (performed by Tom Waits)	Jim Jarmusch	4:40
10.	"Ev'ry Time We Say Goodbye" (performed by Annie Lennox)	Ed Lachman	3:55
11.	"Night + Day" (performed by U2)	Wim Wenders	5:21
12.	"I Love Paris" (performed by Les Négresses Vertes)	Roger Pomphrey	3:13
13.	"So in Love" (performed by k.d. lang)	Percy Adlon	4:41
14.	"Who Wants to Be a Millionaire?" (performed by Thompson Twins)		3:18
15.	"Too Darn Hot" (performed by Erasure)	Adelle Lutz + Sandy McLeod	3:40
16.	"I Get a Kick Out of You" (performed by Jungle Brothers)	Mark Pellington	2:52
17.	"Down in the Depths" (performed by Lisa Stansfield)	Phillippe Gautier	4:27
18.	"From This Moment On" (performed by Jimmy Somerville)	Steve McLean	3:18
19.	"After You, Who?" (performed by Jody Watley)	Matthew Rolston	3:10
20.	"Do I Love You?" (performed by Aztec Camera)	John Scarlett-Davies	4:40
Total length:			77:03

== Personnel ==
Adapted from the album's liner notes.

=== Album production ===
- Produced by Leigh Blake & John Carlin
- Created by Leigh Blake, John Carlin & F. Richard Pappas
- Executive producers: Paul Conroy & F. Richard Pappas
- Supervising musical producer: Steve Lillywhite
- Helene Silverman – art direction
- Frank Gargiulo – design

=== Track credits ===
"I've Got U Under My Skin"

- Neneh Cherry – vocals
- Nick Plytas – piano
- Afrika Baby Bam, Neneh Cherry, Jonny Dollar, Booga Bear – production
- Brian 'Chuck' New, Afrika Baby Bam, Booga Bear – mixing
- Recorded at Coach House (Bristol, England)
- Mixed at Konk (London, England)

"In the Still of the Night"

- Aaron Neville – lead vocals
- Art Neville – vocals, keyboards
- Charles Neville – saxophone
- Cyril Neville – vocals, percussion
- Willie Green – drums
- Tony Hall – bass guitar
- Eric Struthers – guitar
- Steve Lillywhite – production
- David Farrell – engineer
- Recorded & mixed at Ultrasonic (New Orleans, Louisiana)
- Direction: Bill Graham Management

"You Do Something to Me"

- Sinead O'Connor – vocals
- The Malcolm Griffiths Orchestra – orchestra; directed by John Mitchell
- Steve Lillywhite – production, mixing
- Chris Dickie – engineer
- Chris Birkett – vocal recording
- Recorded at RAK (London, England)
- Mixed at Roundhouse (London, England)

"Begin the Beguine"

- Salif Keita – vocals
- Santos Chillemi – piano, production, arrangement
- Jean Pierre Alcouffe – brass, executive producer
- Fabrice Castelot – guitar, engineer
- Souleymane Doumbia – percussion
- Kélétigui Diabaté – balafon
- Andre Soulies & Patrick Fremeaux – management & coordination
- Recorded at TLD (Paris, France)

"Love for Sale"

- Roland Gift – vocals, production
- David Steele – bass, keyboards, production, mixing
- Andy Cox – guitar, production, mixing
- Graeme Hamilton – piano, trumpet
- Saxa – saxophone, percussion
- Martin Parry – drums
- The Browns – backing vocals
- Phil Savage – engineer
- Robert Musso – mixing

"Well, Did You Evah!"

- Deborah Harry – vocals
- Iggy Pop – vocals
- Chris Stein – guitar, synthesizer, production
- Mel Gaynor – drums
- Guy Pratt – bass guitar
- Steve Lillywhite – production
- Mark Wallis – engineer
- Chris Bandy – assistant engineer
- Recorded at Red Night (New York City, New York); additional recording at Townhouse (London, England)

"Miss Otis Regrets / Just One of Those Things"

- Kirsty MacColl – vocals
- Shane MacGowan – vocals
- The Pogues – all instruments
- Steve Lillywhite – production, mixing
- Chris Dickie – engineer, mixing
- Daniel Duncan – assistant engineer
- Nigel Godrich – assistant engineer
- Recorded and mixed at RAK (London, England)

"Don't Fence Me In"

- David Byrne – vocals, guitar, production, arrangement
- Kenny Kosek – fiddle
- Jimmy MacDonell – accordion, tamborim
- Portinho Tamborim – drums, backing vocals
- Seku Tongue – tamborim, whistle
- Repinique, Reinaldo Fernandes, Surdo, Greto Negro, Jose Sena Nego Gato, Herculano, Mazinho Marques, Timbao, Tony Mola, Charlie Negrita, Odimar, Steve Sacks, Annie Sarabia, Caixa, Helio Schiavo – backing vocals
- Steve Lillywhite – mixing
- Mark Wallis – engineer
- Nick Prout – engineer
- Bill Allen – second engineer
- Sandy Palmer – second engineer, backing vocals
- Simon Van Zwanenberg – assistant engineer
- Brenda Dunlap – production coordinator, backing vocals
- Recorded at BMG (New York City, New York)
- Mixed at Roundhouse (London, England)

"It's All Right with Me"

- Tom Waits – vocals, Chamberlin, percussion, production
- Greg Cohen – bass guitar, percussion, production
- Biff Dawes, Bill Jackson – engineers
- Catharina Masters – project coordination
- Recorded at Sunset Sound (Hollywood, California)

"Ev'ry Time We Say Goodbye"

- Annie Lennox – vocals
- Ed Shearmur – piano
- James Fearnley – accordion
- Chucho Merchán – bass guitar
- Steve Lillywhite – production, mixing
- Chris Dickie – engineer
- Karl Madert – engineer
- Recorded at RAK (London, England)
- Mixed at Utopia (London, England)

"Night + Day"

- Dr. Paul Barrett – keyboards, production
- Noel Eccles – congas
- The Edge – infinite guitar, production
- Steve Lillywhite – executive producer
- Ian Bryan, Eoghan McCarron – engineers
- "Recorded in Edge's basement, June 1990"

"I Love Paris"

- Helno – lead vocals
- Mellino – guitar, backing vocals
- Mathieu Canavese – accordion, backing vocals
- Jeroz – guitar, backing vocals
- Abraham Sirinix – percussion, backing vocals
- Paulo – bass guitar
- Julo – backing vocals
- Gaby Le Magnifique – bongos
- Ze Ze – drums
- Sodi & Clive – production, mixing
- Recorded at Davout & Guillaume Tell (Paris, France)
- Mixed at Mayfair (London, England)

"So in Love"

- k.d. lang – vocals, production
- Ben Mink – guitar, production
- Ted Borowiecki – accordion
- David Piltch – bass guitar
- Kim Zick – drums
- Connie Grauer – keyboards
- Greg Penny – production
- Joe Seta – engineer
- Mark Ramaer – second engineer
- Recorded at Vancouver Studios (Vancouver, British Columbia)

"Who Wants to Be a Millionaire?"

- Tom Bailey – vocals, production, mixing
- Alannah Currie – vocals
- Steve Lillywhite – production, mixing
- Keith Fernley – production, mixing
- Lee Curle – assistant
- Recorded at Point Music (London, England)
- Mixed at Mayfair (London, England)

"Too Darn Hot"

- Andy Bell – vocals, production, arranger
- Vince Clarke – vocals, production, arranger
- Steve Lillywhite – mixing
- Jim Goatley – engineer
- Mark Wallis – engineer
- John Azelvandre – assistant engineer
- Simon Van Zwanenberg – assistant engineer
- Recorded at Sorcerer Sound (New York City, New York)

"I Get a Kick Out of You"

- Afrika Baby Bam – vocals, production
- Mike Gee, Sammy B – vocals
- Steve Finan, Lucien – backing vocals
- Robert Power – engineer
- Recorded at Calliope (New York City, New York)

"Down in the Depths"

- Lisa Stansfield – vocals, production
- Andy Morris, Ian Devaney – brass, production
- Stephen Gibson – additional trumpet
- Kevin Whitehead – drums

"From This Moment On"

- Jimmy Somerville – vocals
- Mark Nevin – guitar, lap steel guitar
- Steve Lillywhite – production
- Tom Bailey – production
- Keith Fernley – production, engineer
- Lee Curle – assistant engineer
- Recorded at Mayfair (London, England)

"After You, Who?"

- Jody Watley – vocals
- Randy Waldman – piano
- John Clayton – bass guitar
- Vinnie Colaiuta – drums
- André Cymone – production
- Bobby Brooks – engineer
- Max Garcia – assistant engineer
- Recorded at Ocean Way (Hollywood, California)
- Mixed at The Loft

"Do I Love You?"

- Roddy Frame – vocals, guitar, production
- Gary Sanctuary – keyboards
- Paul Powell – bass guitar
- Frank Tontoh – drums
- Eric Calvi – production, engineer
- Recorded at Rockfield (Monmouth, Wales)
