= Necessary Evil (Deborah Harry album) =

Studio album by Deborah Harry
- Released: September 17, 2007
- Recorded: 2007
- Genre: Pop rock; rock
- Length: 48:29
- Label: Eleven Seven
- Producer: Barb Morrison; Charles Nieland; Chris Stein; Bill Ware

Deborah Harry chronology
Most of All: The Best of Deborah Harry (1999)	Necessary Evil (2007)

Professional ratings
Aggregate scores
Source	Rating
Metacritic	50/100
Review scores
Source	Rating
AllMusic	2.5/5 stars
Digital Spy	3/5 stars
Robert Christgau	(3-star Honorable Mention)
Rolling Stone	3/5 stars

Necessary Evil, is the fifth solo album by the American singer Deborah Harry. Released in September 2007, it was her first solo album in fourteen years, and the first since the reformation of Blondie in the late 1990s. To date, it is her last solo album.

== Background ==
In several interviews, Harry said the album was recorded slowly. At first, the project was just a handful of songs from over a few years that she had never intended to develop into a full album. Eventually, she found herself working with Barb Morrison and Charles Nieland of production team Super Buddha and signed to the Eleven Seven Music record label.

== Release and Promotion ==
The album was preceded by the single "Two Times Blue", released on the iTunes Store on June 6, 2007.

Harry promoted the album on Cyndi Lauper's True Colors Tour 2007, performing a number of songs from the album. Upon its release in the UK, it debuted at No. 86. In the US, it debuted at No. 37 on the Independent Chart.

On January 18, 2008, an official music video for "If I Had You" was released. The video starred, then unknown, pop star Austin Riva.

== Track listing ==
All tracks are written by Debbie Harry, Barbara Jean Morrison, Charles W. Nieland, exceptions were noted.

Necessary Evil track listing
No.	Title	Writer(s)	Length
1.	"Two Times Blue"		3:56
2.	"School for Scandal"		3:09
3.	"If I Had You"	Morrison, Nieland	3:18
4.	"Deep End"		3:11
5.	"Love with a Vengeance"		4:41
6.	"Necessary Evil"		3:31
7.	"Charm Redux"		1:15
8.	"You're Too Hot"		3:41
9.	"Dirty and Deep"	Harry, Morrison, Nieland, Sean Travis Dempsey	3:16
10.	"What Is Love?"		4:32
11.	"Whiteout"		4:30
12.	"Needless to Say"		4:15
13.	"Heat of the Moment"		4:09
14.	"Charm Alarm"	Harry, Morrison, Nieland, Guy Furrow	5:02
Total length:			48:29

Necessary Evil US bonus tracks
No.	Title	Writer(s)	Producer(s)	Length
15.	"Jen Jen"	Chris Stein	Chris Stein	5:15
16.	"Naked Eye"	Harry, Stein	Stein	4:28
17.	"Paradise"	Roy Nathanson, Bill Ware	Bill Ware	6:20
Total length:				64:22

== Personnel ==
- Deborah Harry – vocals, guitar (track 8), percussion (track 10)

With

- Tracks 1–14
  - Super Buddha – all instruments, except as noted
  - Mark Marone – drums (tracks 2–4, 14)
  - Sean Travis Dempsey – keyboards and drum programming (track 9)
  - Miss Guy – additional vocals (track 14)
- Tracks 15–16
  - Chris Stein – all instruments
- Track 17
  - Roy Nathanson – saxophone
  - Bill Ware – all other instruments

== Charts ==
Chart performance for Necessary Evil
Chart (2007)	Peak position
UK Albums (OCC)	86
US Independent Albums (Billboard)	37

== Release history ==
Release history and formats for Necessary Evil
Region	Date
United Kingdom	September 17, 2007
United States	October 9, 2007
Germany	October 26, 2007
