= John Garrison (author) =

American scholar and author

John Stanley Garrison
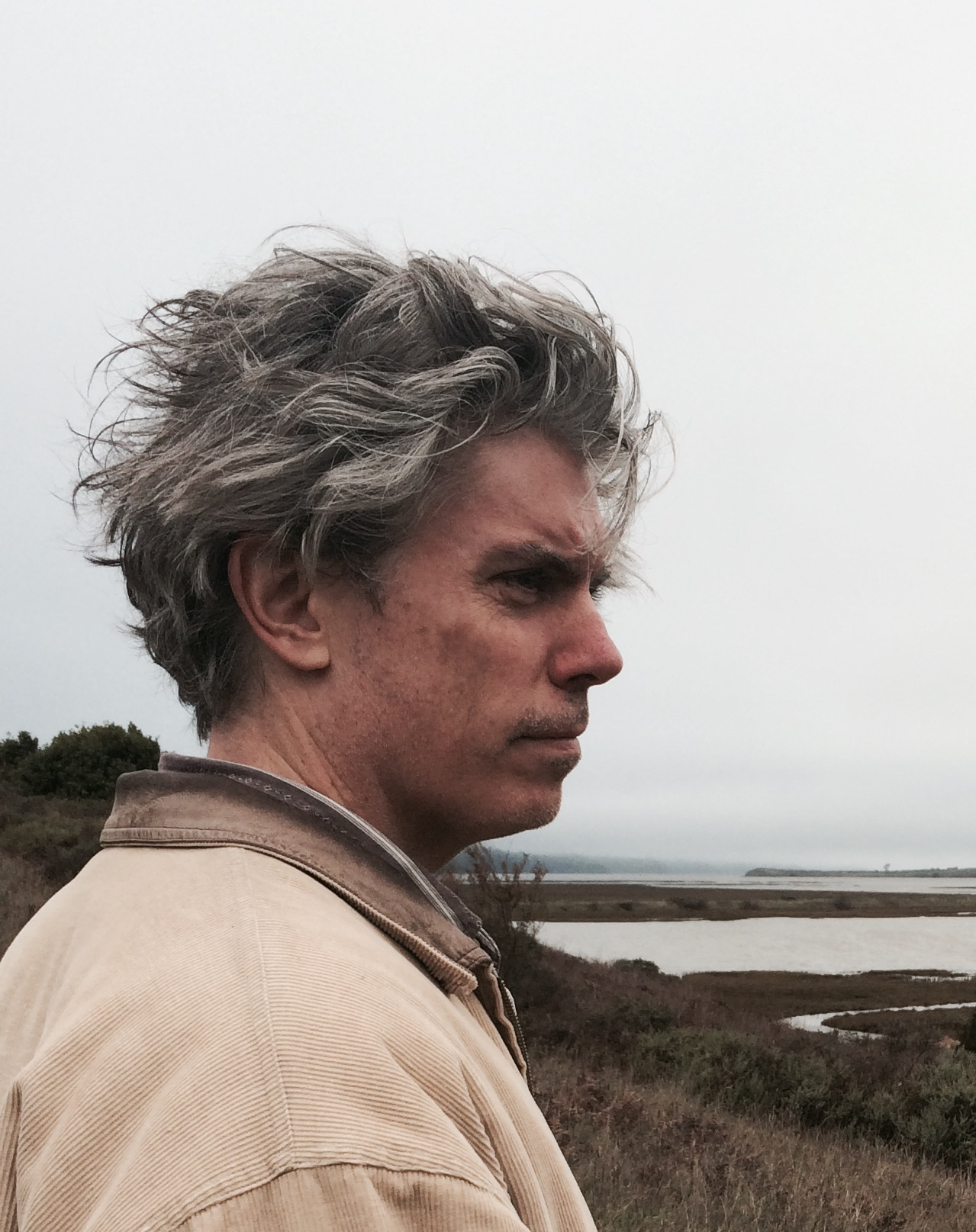
- Born: Pittsburgh
- Education: University of California, Berkeley (B.A.); University of California, Davis (Ph.D.)
- Occupations: Author, professor
- Awards: Guggenheim Fellowship, National Endowment for the Humanities

John S. Garrison is an American author and scholar of William Shakespeare and Renaissance literature. In 2021, he was named a recipient of a Guggenheim Fellowship for his scholarship on English literature.

== Early life and education ==
Garrison was born in Pittsburgh. He is the son of civil engineer William Louis Garrison.

Garrison earned a Bachelor of Arts in English literature from University of California, Berkeley in 1993 and a Ph.D. from University of California, Davis in 2007. Prior to obtaining his graduate degree in English literature, Garrison worked for organizations in both the private and public sectors, including the Levi Strauss Foundation.

== Career ==
Garrison's writing centers on themes of identity, language, and memory. His book Glass was one of the first books in the Object Lessons series and explores how the material—from mirrors to the telescope to the camera lens—has shaped how humans relate to themselves and to others. His thinking on the cultural history of this material has also been featured in The Atlantic and on the Colin McEnroe Show, an NPR podcast hosted by Colin McEnroe. In Shakespeare and the Afterlife, he explores how human fantasies about what comes after death ultimately reflect anxieties and desires of people in the present moment. Shakespeare at Peace, co-written with Kyle Pivetti, contemplates how possibilities for sustainable peace might be traced to ideas in Renaissance literature. With Pivetti, he is co-editor of the scholarly book series Spotlight on Shakespeare. In The Pleasures of Memory in Shakespeare's Sonnets (2023), Garrison explores how the poems showcase the intertwined nature of desire and recollection.

Beyond his non-fiction writing, Garrison also publishes creative work, and in 2004 he was a finalist for the James White Award for short fiction. In addition to being named a Guggenheim Fellow, he has received two fellowships from the National Endowment for the Humanities.

On January 27, 2023, Bloomsbury Press announced that Garrison would be writing a volume for the next round of books in their (33 1)/3 (Thirty-Three and a Third) book series. The book mixes memoir and cultural history as it discusses Red Hot + Blue, a 1990 compilation album from the Red Hot Organization featuring tributes to Cole Porter to raise awareness about the AIDS epidemic.

== Bibliography ==
- Glass. Bloomsbury Publishing, 2015. ISBN 978-1628924244
- Sexuality and Memory in Early Modern England: Literature and the Erotics of Recollection. With Kyle Pivetti. Routledge, 2015. ISBN 9780367871987
- Shakespeare at Peace. With Kyle Pivetti. Routledge, 2018. ISBN 978-1138230897
- Shakespeare and the Afterlife Oxford University Press, 2018. ISBN 978-0198801108
- Making Milton: Print, Authorship, Afterlives. With Emma Depledge and Marissa Nicosia. Oxford University Press, 2021. ISBN 978-0198821892
- Ovid and Masculinity in English Renaissance Literature. With Goran Stanivukovic. McGill–Queen's University Press, 2021. ISBN 978-0228003441
- Performing Gods in Classical Antiquity and the Age of Shakespeare. With Dustin Dixon. Bloomsbury Publishing, 2021. ISBN 978-1350098145
- The Pleasures of Memory in Shakespeare's Sonnets. Oxford University Press, 2023. ISBN 978-0198857716
- Red Hot + Blue. Bloomsbury Press, 2024. ISBN 979-8765106631
