= Debbie Harry =

American singer-songwriter and actress (born 1945)

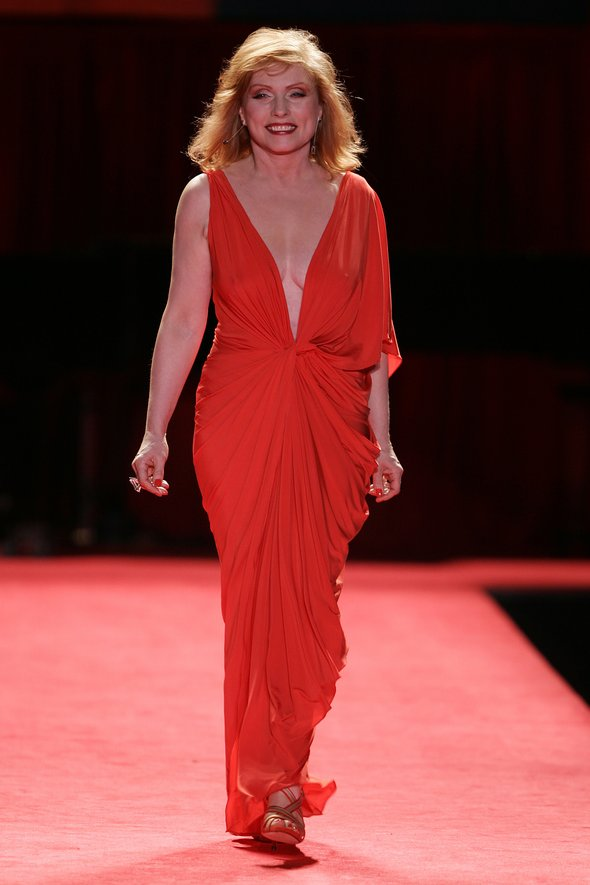
- Harry at The Heart Truth's Red Dress Collection Fashion Show, 2006
- Born: Angela Trimble; July 1, 1945 (age 81); Miami, Florida, U.S.
- Other name: Deborah Ann Harry
- Education: Centenary College (AA)
- Occupations: Singer; songwriter; actress
- Years active: 1966–present
- Musical career
- Origin: New York City, U.S.
- Genres: Rock; new wave; punk rock; disco; pop; hip-hop
- Instruments: Vocals
- Labels: Chrysalis; Geffen; Epic; Sire; Eleven Seven
- Member of: Blondie
- Formerly of: The Wind in the Willows; The Jazz Passengers
- Debbie Harry's voice From the BBC program Desert Island Discs, May 22, 2011

Deborah Ann Harry (born Angela Trimble; July 1, 1945) is an American singer, songwriter and actress, best known as the lead vocalist of the band Blondie. Often referred to as the "Queen of New Wave", she achieved significant commercial success with the group. Between 1979 and 1981, four of her songs with Blondie reached No. 1 on the U.S. Billboard Hot 100.

Born in Miami, Florida, Harry was adopted as an infant and raised in Hawthorne, New Jersey. After graduating from college, she worked various jobs—including as a dancer, a Playboy Bunny, and a secretary at the BBC in New York—before pursuing music full-time. In 1974, she co-formed Blondie in New York City. The band released its eponymous debut studio album in 1976, followed by three more studio albums by 1979; among these was Parallel Lines, which spawned six singles, including the hit "Heart of Glass". Their fifth studio album, Autoamerican (1980), produced further hits with a cover of "The Tide Is High" and "Rapture", the latter of which is considered the first rap song to chart at number one in the United States.

Harry released her debut solo studio album, KooKoo, in 1981. During a Blondie hiatus, she embarked on an acting career, appearing in lead roles in the neo-noir Union City (1980) and in David Cronenberg's body horror film Videodrome (1983). She released her second solo studio album, 1986's Rockbird, and starred in John Waters's cult dance film Hairspray (1988), and short film Forever, Lulu (1987) .She released two more solo albums between then and 1993, before returning to film with roles in a John Carpenter-directed segment of the horror film Body Bags (1993), and in the drama Heavy (1995).

Blondie reunited in the late 1990s, releasing No Exit (1999) and The Curse of Blondie (2003). Throughout the 2000s, Harry continued to appear in independent films, including Deuces Wild (2003), My Life Without Me (2003), Spun (2002), and Elegy (2008). Returning to the studio with Blondie, she fronted the group's subsequent albums, Panic of Girls (2011) and Ghosts of Download (2014). The band's eleventh studio album, Pollinator (2017), charted at number 4 in the United Kingdom. In late 2026, Blondie announced High Noon, their first new studio album in nine years. Scheduled for release in early 2027, the album features collaboration with Johnny Marr and Glen Matlock and was preceded by the single "Spectral Eyes", (October) along with "Come Back Home", which was released November 19th 2026.

== Early life ==
Harry was born Angela Trimble on July 1, 1945, at the Jackson Memorial Hospital in Miami, Florida. At three months old, she was adopted and renamed Deborah Ann Harry by Catherine (née Peters) and Richard Harry, of Hawthorne, New Jersey, who later became gift shop proprietors in Cooperstown, New York. She is of Scottish ancestry, with her biological parents' surnames being Trimble and Mackenzie. Harry learned of her adoption at age four. Though she initially decided against tracing her lineage, she eventually located her birth mother—a concert pianist—in the late 1980s, though her biological mother chose not to establish a relationship with her. In her memoir, Harry recalls being a tomboy who spent much of her childhood playing in the woods adjacent to her home. During these formative years, she also sang in a church choir and made her stage debut in a sixth-grade school performance.

Harry attended Hawthorne High School, where she was voted "Best Looking" and graduated in 1963. She then earned an Associate of Arts degree from Centenary College in Hackettstown, New Jersey, in 1965. Moving to New York City in the late 1960s, she worked as a secretary at the BBC Radio office there for one year before pursuing music. During this pre-fame period, she also worked as a waitress at Max's Kansas City, a go-go dancer at a discothèque in Union City, New Jersey, and a Playboy Bunny.

== Career ==
=== 1966–1975: Early bands and formation of Blondie ===
In the late 1960s, Harry began her musical career as a vocalist for the folk rock group The Wind in the Willows, which released an eponymous studio album on Capitol Records in 1968.

In 1973, Harry joined the Stilettoes alongside Elda Gentile, Billy O'Connor, Fred Smith, Rosie Ross, and later, Amanda Jones. The band soon added guitarist Chris Stein, who also became her long-term partner.

In 1974, Harry and Stein left the Stilettoes along with the band's bassist and drummer to form Angel and the Snake, which also featured Tish and Snooky Bellomo. Shortly thereafter, they renamed the group Blondie, a title derived from the catcalls men frequently directed at Harry after she bleached her hair blonde. The band quickly became regulars on the New York City punk scene, playing frequent gigs at Max's Kansas City and CBGB.

=== 1976–1981: Global success ===
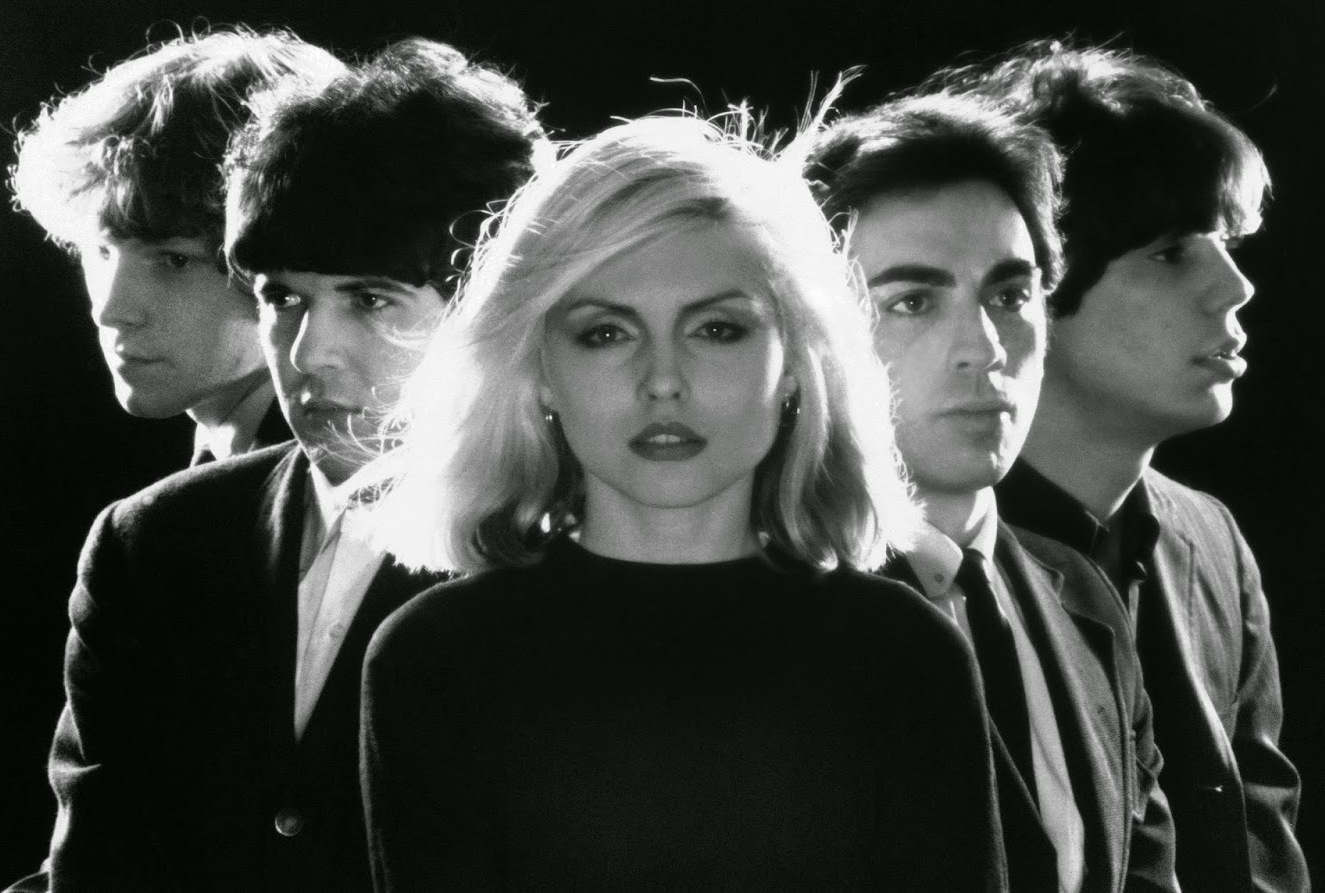
Blondie in 1976, fronted by Harry

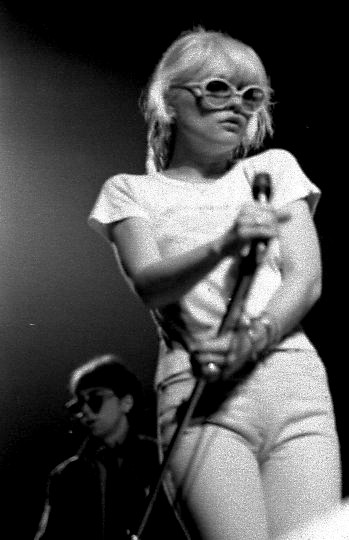
Harry performing with Blondie in Toronto, 1977

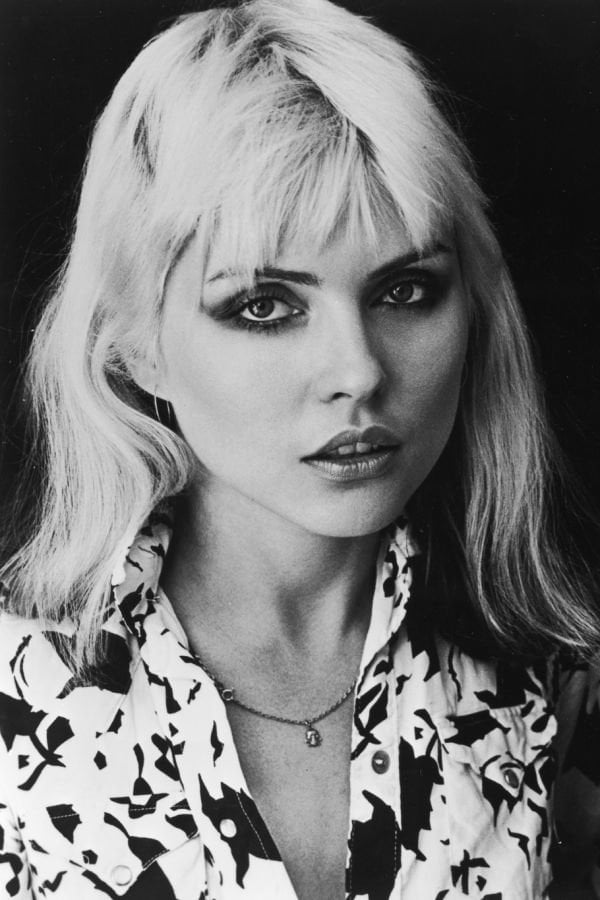
A promotional image for the Plastic Letters album in 1978

Blondie released their self-titled debut album in 1976; it peaked at No. 14 in Australia and, following a later reissue in 1979, reached No. 75 in the United Kingdom. While their second album, Plastic Letters (1978), garnered moderate success outside the United States, it was their third studio album, Parallel Lines (1978), that became a worldwide phenomenon and catapulted the group to international stardom. The album featured the global hit single "Heart of Glass", a track incorporating disco elements that reached No. 1 in the U.S. and sold nearly two million copies. The single also topped the charts at No. 1 in the UK, where it became the second highest-selling single of 1979.

In June 1979, Blondie was featured on the cover of Rolling Stone. Harry's persona, combining cool sexuality with streetwise style, became so closely associated with the group's public identity that many conflated her stage persona with the band itself, believing "Blondie" was the singer's name. This distinction was underscored by the band's famous "Blondie is a group" button campaign later that year. The band's commercial success continued that September with the release of the platinum-certified album Eat to the Beat (UK No. 1, US No. 17). .

In August 1980, Harry was photographed by pop artist Andy Warhol at the Factory for a series of custom artworks. Warhol ultimately produced four distinct silkscreen portraits of Harry in varying color schemes. Chris Stein was also present to document the session, capturing a collection of behind-the-scenes photographs that were later exhibited in London in 2013.

The band's fourth studio album, Autoamerican (UK No. 3, US No. 7), was released in 1980. That same year, Blondie achieved a string of chart-topping successes, scoring No. 1 hits with "Atomic" from Eat to the Beat (UK No. 1) and "Call Me", the theme from the film American Gigolo (US and UK No. 1). Their chart dominance continued with the primary singles from Autoamerican: a reggae-infused cover of "The Tide Is High" (US and UK No. 1) and the innovative genre-blending track "Rapture" (US No. 1).

During this time, both Harry and Stein befriended graffiti artist and hip-hop pioneer Fab Five Freddy, who introduced them to the emerging Bronx hip-hop scene and was subsequently namechecked in the lyrics of "Rapture". Through him, they connected with Grandmaster Flash, who was intended to appear in the song's music video; after his record label blocked the appearance, artist Jean-Michel Basquiat stepped in to portray the DJ instead. In 1981, "Rapture" made history by becoming the first rap-oriented song to reach No. 1 on the U.S. Billboard Hot 100 chart. Grandmaster Flash later reflected on the track's cultural significance, stating that Harry had "opened up so many doors for hip hop" by mainstreaming the genre and shouting him out on the track.

=== 1981–1996: Solo work and acting ===
In 1981, Harry issued a press release to clarify that her name was not "Debbie Blondie" or "Debbie Harry" but rather Deborah Harry. However, she later described her public persona in the band as explicitly being named "Blondie", a sentiment she reflected on in the group's 1999 No Exit tour book:

Hi, it's Deb. You know, when I woke up this morning I had a realization about myself. I was always Blondie. People always called me Blondie, ever since I was a little kid. What I realized is that at some point I became Dirty Harry. I couldn't be Blondie anymore, so I became Dirty Harry.

Harry launched her solo career with the debut album KooKoo (1981). Produced by Nile Rodgers and Bernard Edwards of Chic, the album peaked at No. 25 in the U.S. and No. 6 in the UK, earning a gold certification in the U.S. and silver in the UK. The album's distinctive cover art, designed by Swiss artist H.R. Giger, featured an image of Harry's face seemingly pierced by large metal skewers; the unorthodox image generated immediate controversy, prompting several major retail chains to refuse to stock the record. Giger also directed the music video for the album's lead single, "Backfired", which reached No. 43 on the Billboard Hot 100, No. 29 on the Hot Dance Club Songs chart, and No. 32 on the UK Singles Chart. "The Jam Was Moving" followed as the second single, peaking at No. 82 in the U.S. That same year, Harry appeared in the independent feature film Downtown 81, starring Jean-Michel Basquiat, portraying a magical bag lady who transforms into a fairy princess upon kissing Basquiat's character.

After a year-long hiatus, Blondie regrouped to release their sixth studio album, The Hunter (1982). The album was significantly less successful than their previous records, and its accompanying world tour was cut short due to slow ticket sales. Concurrently, Stein fell seriously ill with the rare autoimmune disease pemphigus, prompting Harry to put her solo career on hold to act as his primary caretaker. This health crisis, combined with declining commercial momentum and mounting internal friction, led the band to officially dismantle later that year, making the Live Toronto performance their last for 15 years.

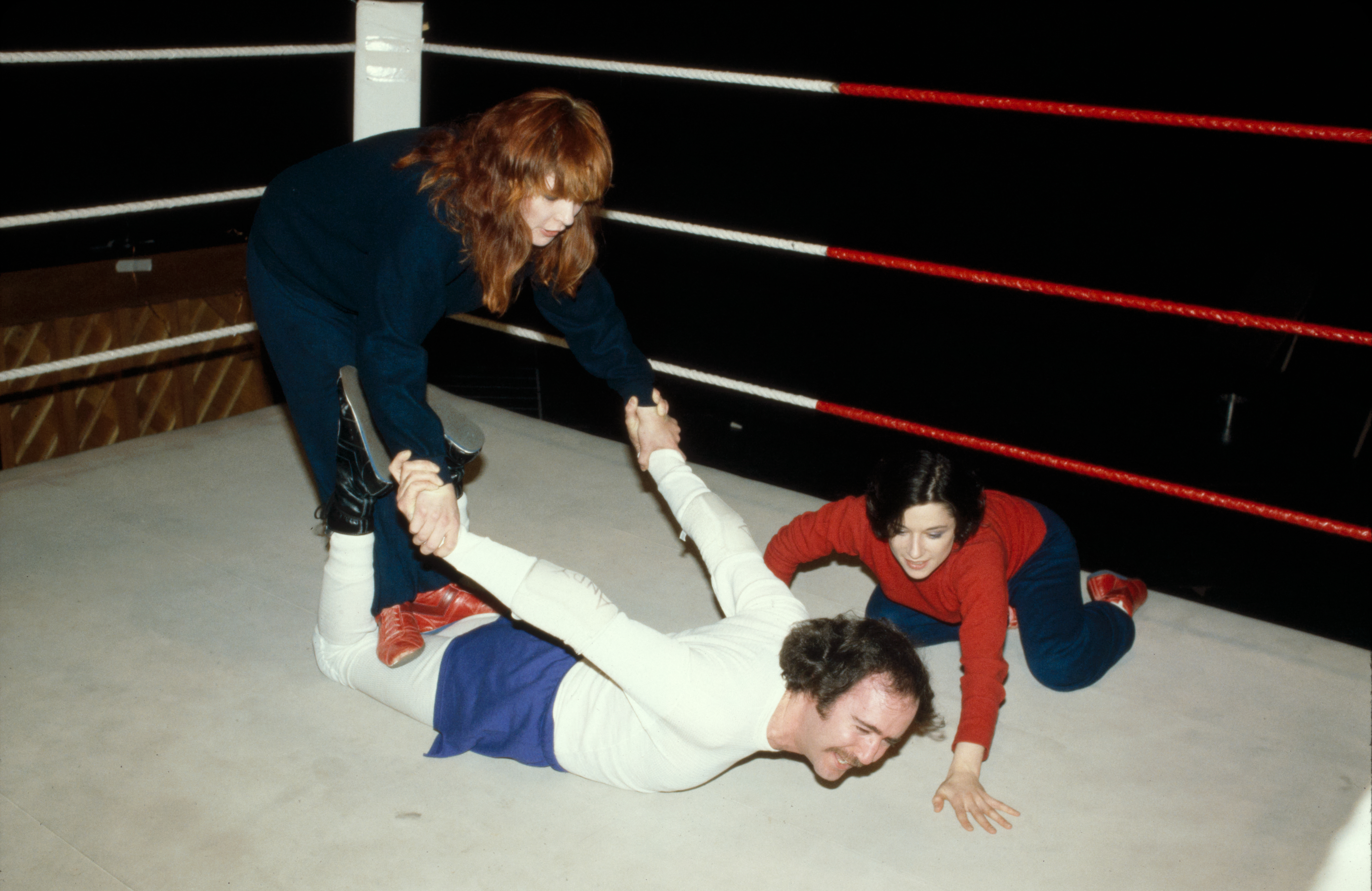
Harry wrestling with her co-stars Andy Kaufman and Caitlin Clarke in Teaneck Tanzi: The Venus, 1983

In June 1982, Harry contributed backing vocals to the Gun Club's second studio album, Miami, under the pseudonym "D.H. Lawrence Jr." Concurrently, Chris Stein produced the album and was credited with playing "bongos" as well as executing the "cover photos/design". The Gun Club's frontman, Jeffrey Lee Pierce, was an ardent fan who had previously emulated Harry's hairstyle and founded the West Coast Blondie Fan Club before befriending the band members in New York City.

In April 1983, Harry made her Broadway debut alternating the titular role of Teaneck Tanzi in the British comedy play Teaneck Tanzi: The Venus Flytrap at the Nederlander Theatre. Harry described the production as a "coming-of-age story with songs and wrestling moves." Because the play was staged entirely inside a functional wrestling ring, the rigorous physical demands of the two leading characters required alternate performers to split the weekly schedule.

Harry released the single "Rush Rush" in 1983, marking her second collaboration with producer Giorgio Moroder for the crime drama film Scarface. While the post-disco track met with limited commercial success on mainstream charts—peaking at No. 87 in the UK and No. 105 in the U.S.—it found a broader audience in clubs, reaching No. 27 on the Billboard Dance Club Songs chart. That same year, Harry landed a leading role in David Cronenberg's body horror film Videodrome (1983), portraying the sadomasochistic lover of a television producer who uncovers a clandestine broadcast of snuff films. Her performance received widespread critical acclaim; critic Howard Hampton later noted in a retrospective for the Criterion Collection that Harry:

...carries herself with the wry, burned-out, but still titillated instincts of a voyager buying a one-way ticket for the outer limits. A vivid, smallish part can either anchor or undo a risky, conceptually spiky film like David Cronenberg’s viscerally deranged phantasia: Harry’s presence grounds it in acute, self-aware reality.

In July 1985, Harry and Warhol collaborated for the official public launch of the Amiga 1000 personal computer by Commodore at Lincoln Center's Vivian Beaumont Theater. During the live presentation, Warhol digitized and manipulated a photograph of Harry on stage to demonstrate the machine's multimedia capabilities, creating a digital pop-art portrait before gifting her one of the computers. Later that year, she appeared as the inaugural guest on Warhol's MTV program, Andy Warhol's Fifteen Minutes. Harry later reflected on the creative philosophy of her friendship with Warhol, stating, "I think the best thing [Andy Warhol] taught me was always to be open to new things, new music, new style, new bands, new technology and just go with it. Never get mired in the past and always accept new things whatever age you are."

A new single, "Feel the Spin" (taken from the hip-hop film Krush Groove), was issued as a limited 12-inch single in 1985 and peaked at No. 5 on the Billboard Dance Club Songs chart. In 1986, Harry released her second solo studio album, Rockbird, which peaked at No. 97 in the U.S. and No. 31 in the UK, where it was certified gold by the BPI for sales exceeding 100,000 copies. The lead single, "French Kissin' in the USA", became a moderate U.S. hit (No. 57) and gave Harry her only UK solo top-ten success, peaking at No. 8. Subsequent singles included "Free to Fall" and "In Love with Love", the latter of which was completely re-recorded in London with the prominent British production trio Stock Aitken Waterman (SAW). This re-recorded version topped the U.S. Dance Club Songs chart at No. 1 and was issued with multiple remixes. Harry also tracked an additional song with SAW during those same London sessions, titled "Mind Over Matter", which remains officially unreleased.

In 1987, Harry portrayed the title character in the mystery-comedy film Forever, Lulu, starring opposite Alec Baldwin in his feature film debut.

In 1988, Harry recorded a cover of "Liar, Liar" for the soundtrack album of the film Married to the Mob, produced by longtime collaborator Mike Chapman. The track marked their first studio collaboration since Blondie's 1982 album The Hunter. That same year, she starred as the villainous, image-obsessed Velma Von Tussle in John Waters' satirical dance film Hairspray. Harry earned praise for her campy, comedic performance as the bigoted antagonist, a role that became one of the most recognized and enduring cult film performances of her acting career.

Her next solo venture was the album Def, Dumb and Blonde (1989). At this point, Harry officially reverted from "Debbie" to "Deborah" as her professional billing name. The lead single, "I Want That Man", became an international hit, achieving success across Europe and Australia, as well as on the U.S. Modern Rock Tracks chart. The momentum of the single propelled the album to No. 12 on the UK Albums Chart, where it earned a silver certification from the BPI. However, due to minimal promotional backing from her record label in the United States, the album peaked at No. 123 on the Billboard 200. She followed the release with the ballad "Brite Side" and the club hit "Sweet and Low". In June 1990, "Maybe for Sure"—a reworked version of "Angel's Song", which she had originally recorded for the animated film Rock and Rule—was issued as the fourth single to coincide with a UK tour. The track "Kiss It Better" was also released, becoming a top-15 hit on the U.S. Modern Rock Tracks chart.

Harry also continued her film career during this period, securing a supporting role as a modern witch in the horror anthology film Tales from the Darkside: The Movie (1990). From 1989 to 1991, she toured extensively worldwide backed by a live band that featured former Blondie guitarist Chris Stein, Underworld's Karl Hyde, and future Blondie bassist Leigh Foxx. This touring cycle included a performance at Wembley Stadium in July 1991 as a supporting act for INXS. Later that year, Chrysalis Records released a greatest hits compilation in Europe titled The Complete Picture: The Very Best of Deborah Harry and Blondie, which aggregated her work with the band alongside her solo material. The collection peaked at No. 3 on the UK Albums Chart and was certified gold by the BPI. Among its tracks was her duet with Iggy Pop on the Cole Porter song "Well, Did You Evah!", which had originally been recorded for the 1990 AIDS charity tribute album Red Hot + Blue.

In 1992, Harry collaborated with German post-punk band Die Haut on the track "Don't Cross My Mind" and released the song "Prelude to a Kiss" for the soundtrack to the film of the same name. She also released a cover of "Summertime Blues" in Australia, taken from the soundtrack to the drama film That Night. Her fourth solo studio album, Debravation, was released in July 1993. The album peaked at No. 24 on the UK Albums Chart but met with less commercial success in the U.S. The album's lead single, "I Can See Clearly", peaked at No. 23 in the UK and reached No. 2 on the U.S. Billboard Dance Club Songs chart. This was followed by the release of "Strike Me Pink" in September. Immediate controversy surrounded the latter track's promotional music video, which depicted a man drowning in a water tank, leading to it being banned from television broadcast. U.S. editions of the album featured two additional tracks recorded over instrumental tracks provided by R.E.M.: "Tear Drops" and a cover of Skeeter Davis's 1961 single "My Last Date (with You)". Concurrently in 1993, Harry secured a supporting role in a John Carpenter-directed segment of the anthology horror film Body Bags.

In November 1993, Harry toured the UK alongside Chris Stein, guitarist Peter Min, bassist Greta Brinkman, and drummer James Murphy. The set list for the Debravation Tour featured an eclectic selection of Harry's material, including the previously unreleased 1989 track "Close Your Eyes" and "Ordinary Bummer"—a song originally from the Stein-produced Iggy Pop album Zombie Birdhouse (1982), which Blondie would later cover in 1997 under the moniker Adolph's Dog. Tentative plans to record and release these performances as a live double CD never materialized; however, live covers of the Rolling Stones' "Wild Horses" and David Oliver's "Love TKO" continue to circulate as bootleg recordings. In early 1994, Harry brought the Debravation tour to the U.S. Following the album's lackluster commercial performance, Harry's long tenure with Chrysalis Records came to an end in the UK; however, the label subsequently issued remastered CD editions of all Blondie studio albums and Harry's solo debut KooKoo, featuring bonus tracks for the first time.

In the mid-1990s, Harry collaborated as a guest vocalist on several diverse musical projects. She joined the avant-garde jazz ensemble the Jazz Passengers in 1994, appearing on their studio album In Love (1994), followed by her featured role on their subsequent record Individually Twisted (1997). During this period, she also reunited with former Blondie keyboardist Jimmy Destri to record a cover of Otis Blackwell's "Don't Be Cruel" for the 1995 album Brace Yourself! A Tribute to Otis Blackwell. Concurrently, she recorded a bilingual duet in German and English with actor Robert Jacks titled "Der Einziger Weg (The Only Way)", which served as the theme for the slasher film Texas Chainsaw Massacre: The Next Generation (1994). In 1996, Harry served as a guest vocalist for the Talking Heads side-project the Heads on their sole album release, No Talking, Just Head. She then collaborated with Jazz Passengers member Bill Ware on his side-project Groove Thing, singing lead vocals on the club track "Command and Obey" (1997). Another performance alongside the Jazz Passengers, "The City in the Sea", appeared on the Edgar Allan Poe audio tribute album Closed on Account of Rabies (1997).

In film, Harry co-starred with Pruitt Taylor Vince and Liv Tyler in James Mangold's directorial debut Heavy (1995), playing a misanthropic waitress at an upstate New York restaurant. The following year, she portrayed a bartender in Mangold's Cop Land (1997).

=== 1997–2007: Blondie reformation and solo output ===
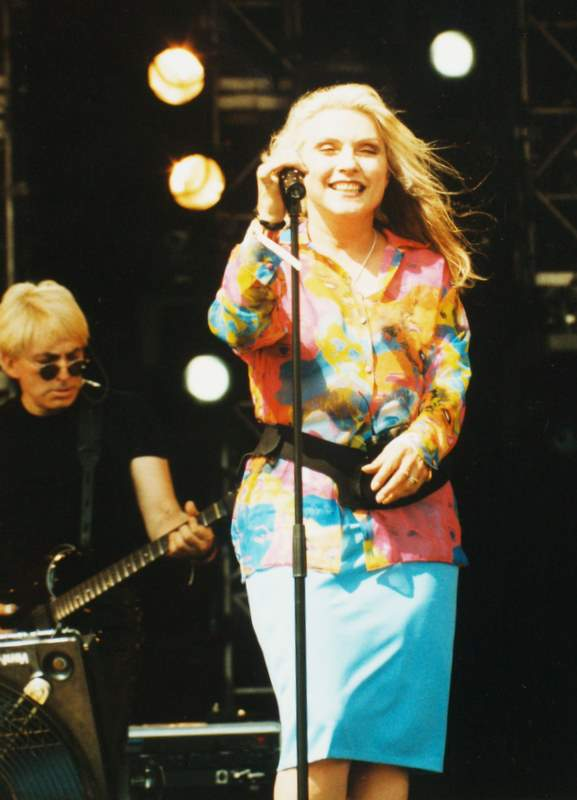
Harry performing with Blondie at Roskilde Festival, 1999

In 1997, Blondie officially reconstituted for the first time in 15 years. The four core original members (Harry, Chris Stein, Clem Burke, and Jimmy Destri) initiated recording sessions for what would become the group's seventh studio album, No Exit (1999). The album's lead single, "Maria", debuted at No. 1 on the UK Singles Chart, securing Blondie their sixth UK number-one hit. "Maria" went on to reach No. 1 in 14 countries, the top ten on the U.S. Billboard Dance Club Songs chart, and the top 20 on the Adult Top 40 chart. Driven by this international success, No Exit debuted at No. 3 in the UK and No. 17 in the U.S. on the Billboard 200.

In 1998, a techno cover of Stan Jones' "Ghost Riders in the Sky" performed by Harry was featured on the soundtrack to the film Three Businessmen and made available for download on her official website. She continued her extensive session work into the early 2000s, appearing on the 2000 Andrea Griminelli compilation Cinema Italiano, where she sang "You'll Come to Me" (adapted from the main theme of Amarcord) and "When Love Comes By" (from Il Postino). The following year, Harry contributed vocals to Bill Ware's album Vibes 4 on the track "Me and You", and performed "Weird Nightmare" on former Police guitarist Andy Summers' Charles Mingus tribute album, Peggy's Blue Skylight. She also recorded a rendition of "Stormy Weather" for a Harold Arlen tribute project. In May 2002, she accompanied the Jazz Passengers and the BBC Concert Orchestra at London's Barbican Centre for a live retrospective of her jazz repertoire. Her guest sessions concluded in 2003 with vocal features on the DJ duo Blow-Up's track "Uncontrollable Love" and a recording of "Waltzing Matilda" for Dan Zanes and Friends' album House Party. Concurrently, Blondie returned to the studio to release their eighth studio album, The Curse of Blondie (2003).

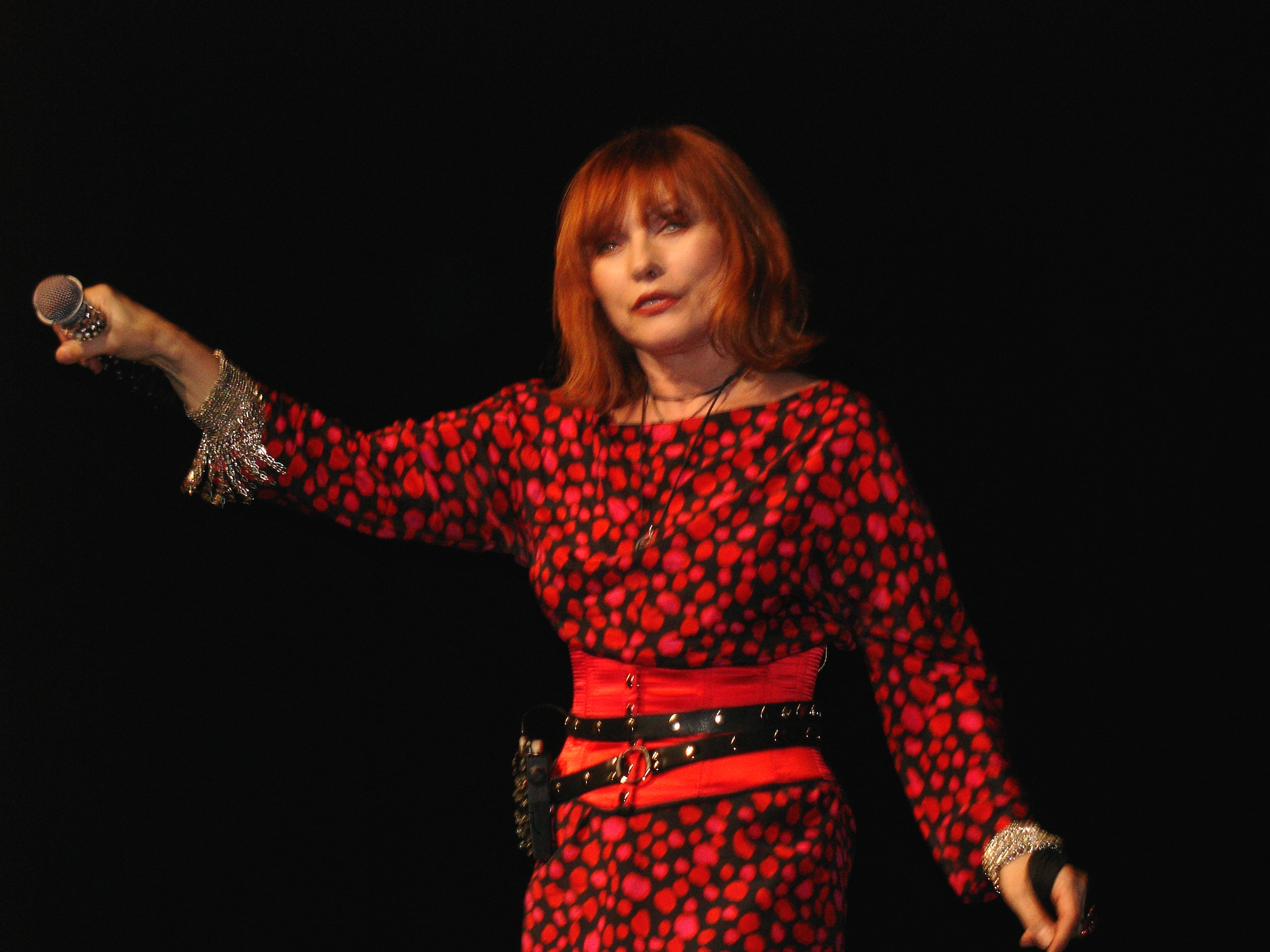
Harry performing at a concert in Dublin, Ireland, in 2005

In 2006, Harry began recording her fifth solo studio album, Necessary Evil (2007), in New York City. She collaborated with the production duo Super Buddha, who had previously remixed Blondie's "In the Flesh" for the group's 2005 Sound and Vision compilation. The first material to surface from these sessions was a hip-hop track titled "Dirty and Deep", in which Harry spoke out against rapper Lil' Kim's incarceration. Throughout 2006, several additional tracks were previewed on her official Myspace page, including "Charm Alarm", "Deep End", "Love with a Vengeance", "Charm Redux", "School for Scandal", and the title track, alongside two duets recorded with Miss Guy of the Toilet Böys: "God Save New York" and "New York Groove". In May 2007, a streaming version of the album's lead single, "Two Times Blue", was added to her Myspace page, followed by an official digital download release via her website on June 6, 2007.

In 2007, Harry clarified the distinction between her various creative personae (the band Blondie, her character within the group, and Deborah Harry the solo artist) when asked by an interviewer why her setlist on Cyndi Lauper's True Colors World Tour strictly omitted Blondie material: "I've put together a new trio with no Blondie members in it. I really want to make a clear definition between Debbie's solo projects and Blondie, and I hope that the audience can appreciate that and also appreciate this other material."

Harry's fifth solo album, Necessary Evil (2007), was released following the conclusion of the True Colors World Tour. Its lead single, "Two Times Blue", peaked at No. 5 on the U.S. Billboard Dance Club Songs chart, while the album itself reached No. 86 on the UK Albums Chart and No. 37 on the U.S. Billboard Top Independent Albums chart. Harry promoted the record through various television talk show performances and embarked on a 22-date U.S. solo tour from November 8 to December 9, 2007, playing an assortment of small venues and clubs across the country. On January 18, 2008, an official music video for "If I Had You" was released to promote the album's second single.

=== 2008–present: Further musical endeavors ===
Harry contributed to Fall Out Boy's 2008 studio album Folie à Deux, singing on the chorus of the album's closer, "West Coast Smoker". In 2010, she began a series of recordings featuring solo tracks and duets with Nick Cave and other contemporary artists for The Jeffrey Lee Pierce Sessions Project. Returning to her work with the group, Blondie released their ninth studio album, Panic of Girls, in 2011.

Harry and Arcade Fire performing at the Coachella Festival 2014

In April 2014, Harry made a guest appearance with Arcade Fire at the Coachella Valley Music and Arts Festival, performing a duet version of "Heart of Glass". That same month, Blondie released their tenth studio album, Ghosts of Download. In March 2015, Harry held a solo concert residency spanning several weeks at the Café Carlyle in New York City. Later that year, she and Chris Stein made a guest appearance alongside the Gregory Brothers in an episode of the online series Songify the News; they collaborated with the group again in 2016, appearing as mock moderators parodying the 2016 United States presidential election debates. Harry returned to the Coachella festival stage with Blondie in 2023, performing a guest-augmented set featuring Nile Rodgers.

Blondie's eleventh studio album, Pollinator, was released in May 2017 and debuted at No. 4 on the UK Albums Chart. In October 2019, Harry published her comprehensive memoir, Face It, through Dey Street Books. In 2020, she made a guest appearance as a manifestation of the main character's musical conscience in the third episode of the romantic comedy series High Fidelity. In 2023, Rolling Stone ranked Harry at number 168 on its list of the 200 Greatest Singers of All Time. In late 2026, Blondie announced High Noon, their twelfth studio album and first release of new material in nine years; scheduled for international release on February 27, 2026, via BMG, the album was preceded by the lead single "Spectral Eyes".

In July 2023, Harry teamed with alternative rock band The Dandy Warhols and electronic musician Nala to record the collaborative single "IWNSLY" (an acronym for "I Will Never Stop Loving You"). A full dark love ballad version of the track, featuring Harry's prominent, reverb-drenched lead vocals on the choruses, was subsequently issued as a single in March 2024 to promote The Dandy Warhols' twelfth studio album, Rockmaker.

On May 8, 2026, it was announced that Harry would star alongside Pamela Anderson in the upcoming comedy film Maitreya.

Blondie's twelfth studio album, High Noon, is scheduled for international release on February 27, 2026, via BMG. Produced by John Congleton, the record marks the group's first collection of original material in nine years and features the final studio recordings of co-founding drummer Clem Burke, who died in 2025. The album also features guest musical contributions from songwriters and musicians including Johnny Marr, who composed the lead single "Spectral Eyes", and Glen Matlock.

== Public image ==
Harry in 1982

During the rise of Blondie in the late 1970s, Harry established a highly distinct public persona that blended cool sexuality with streetwise, punk rock style. Her signature bleached-blonde hair, two-tone roots, and avant-garde stage outfits became defining visuals of the new wave era. Harry's visual presence was so dominant that the public frequently conflated her stage persona with the band itself, mistakenly believing "Blondie" was the singer's individual name; this prompted the band's famous 1979 "Blondie is a group" button campaign to reinforce their identity as an ensemble.

In August 1980, pop artist Andy Warhol photographed Harry at the Factory for a series of custom artworks, ultimately producing four distinct silkscreen portraits of her in varying color schemes. In July 1985, she further bridged the gap between punk rock and digital technology by collaborating with Warhol for the live public launch of the Amiga 1000 personal computer at Lincoln Center. Music journalists have noted that Harry successfully subverted traditional female pop star archetypes by weaponizing her bombshell aesthetic with an aggressive, detached punk delivery, heavily influencing the formatting of modern music media and visual storytelling.

== Legacy and influence ==
Widely referred to by music publications as the "Queen of New Wave", Harry is recognized as one of the most influential frontwomen in rock history. With Blondie, she achieved immense commercial success, scoring four number-one singles on the U.S. Billboard Hot 100 chart between 1979 and 1981. Her work on the 1980 single "Rapture" secured a landmark cultural crossover as the first rap-oriented song to top the U.S. charts, earning praise from hip-hop pioneers like Grandmaster Flash for mainstreaming the emerging Bronx subculture.

Harry's vocal style, fashion choices, and fierce independence paved the way for generations of alternative, punk, and mainstream pop artists. Musicians such as Madonna, Lady Gaga, Miley Cyrus, Hayley Williams, Charli XCX, Cyndi Lauper, Gwen Stefani of No Doubt, and Shirley Manson of Garbage have all cited Harry as a foundational blueprint for navigating the music industry as a female frontwoman. Her crossover appeal has also been recognized by a younger generation of performers; artists such as Billie Eilish, and St. Vincent have performed her tracks or credited her style with shaping their visual aesthetics. In 2023, Rolling Stone ranked Harry at number 168 on its list of the 200 Greatest Singers of All Time, noting that her vocal delivery effortlessly bridged the gap between raw street grit and refined pop brilliance. Her enduring cultural impact is further underscored by her continued inclusion in contemporary media, such as her guest appearance in the series High Fidelity, and her ongoing recording career with Blondie's twelfth studio album, High Noon.

== Personal life ==
Harry had a 13-year relationship with Blondie guitarist Chris Stein. In 1982, Stein was diagnosed with pemphigus vulgaris, a rare autoimmune disease of the skin, and Harry put her career on hold to care for him during his recovery. During this period, the couple faced severe financial difficulties after the IRS seized their assets over unpaid taxes, and both struggled with heroin addiction. Reflecting on the bohemian 1960s and 1970s Manhattan art scene, Harry recalled in a 1993 interview with Q that "drugs [were] chic" and that "everybody in New York was fooling around with drugs." In a 2019 retrospective with The Guardian, she described her subsequent heroin use as a "necessary evil" and, "to some degree," a form of "self-medicating" through a "rough, depressing time of life, but then it outlived its benefits."

Harry and Stein ended their romantic relationship in February 1987, due to a combination of growing apart and Harry's decision to discontinue methadone treatment while Stein remained on it. Despite their separation, they maintained a close personal and professional friendship, and Harry subsequently became the godmother to Stein's two daughters.

Harry was in a brief romantic relationship with magician Penn Jillette from 1995 to 1996; following their separation, the two remained close friends.

In 2014, Harry confirmed past relationships with women, noting to the Daily Mail that she found women to be "more sensual" but had relatively little experience. She later elaborated on her sexuality in a 2017 interview, stating, "My bisexual days have gone by actually. I have great affection for some of my female friends but I think maybe when I was younger it might have been a little more hormonal and our hormones change." Speaking to MOJO magazine that same year, Harry clarified that she had only experimented a few times later in life, adding, "but I like men, I'm a fool," and confirming that her romantic attractions are directed toward men.

In her 2019 memoir, Face It, Harry detailed having been raped at knifepoint during a burglary of the New York City apartment she shared with Chris Stein in the 1970s. She also wrote that during the early 1970s, she narrowly escaped an abduction attempt in Manhattan by a man she later identified as serial killer Ted Bundy. Harry's description of the vehicle—a white car with its interior stripped bare and missing the passenger door handle—deviated from the tan Volkswagen Beetle Bundy was known to drive. Furthermore, biographers and authorities noted that Bundy was documented living in the Pacific Northwest at the time and did not travel to the East Coast or Florida until late 1977. Ann Rule, author of the Bundy biography The Stranger Beside Me, noted that unverified claims of narrow escapes from Bundy are relatively common among women who experienced late-night vehicular scares during that era.

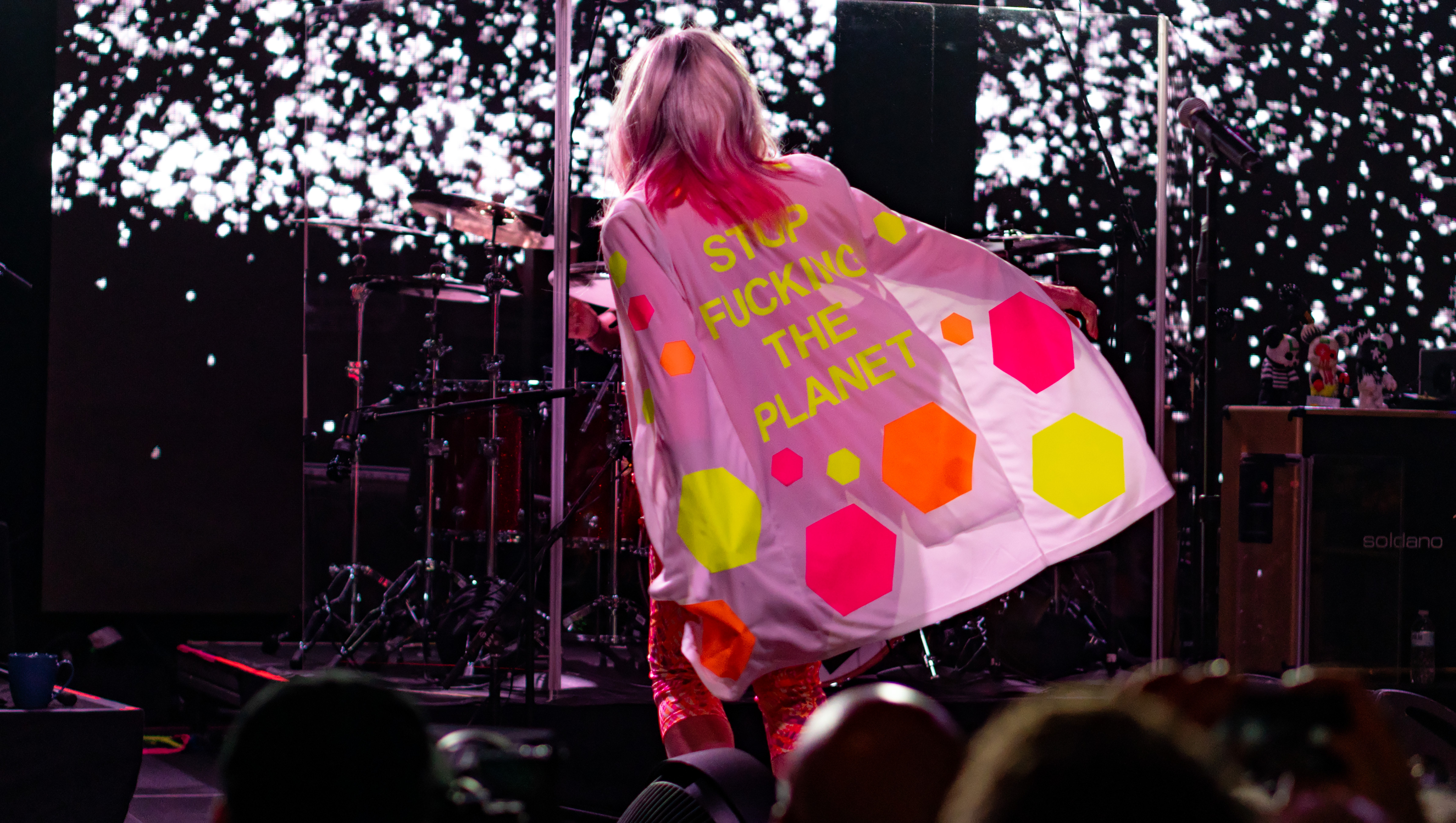
Harry performing in 2018, displaying an environmentalist message

Harry splits her residence between the Chelsea neighborhood of New York City and a home in Middletown Township, New Jersey, where she lives with her four dogs.

=== Philanthropy ===
In a 2011 interview, Harry stated that "After witnessing Elton John and his tireless efforts against HIV/AIDS," she had been inspired to make philanthropy a central focus of her career. She remarked: "These things are important to my life now. I have the privilege of being able to get involved, so I do. I applaud people like Elton John, who have used their position to do so much good." Beyond HIV/AIDS advocacy, Harry's philanthropic work extends to supporting organizations dedicated to fighting cancer and endometriosis.

== Discography ==
Studio albums

- KooKoo (1981)
- Rockbird (1986)
- Def, Dumb & Blonde (1989)
- Debravation (1993)
- Necessary Evil (2007)

Compilations and other albums

- Once More into the Bleach (1988, Debbie Harry and Blondie)
- The Complete Picture: The Very Best of Deborah Harry and Blondie (1991, Deborah Harry and Blondie)
- Deborah Harry Collection (1998)
- Most of All: The Best of Deborah Harry (1999)
