= Brite Side =

Single by Deborah Harry

from the album Def, Dumb & Blonde
- Released: November 1989
- Recorded: 1989
- Genre: Pop
- Label: Chrysalis (UK)
- Songwriters: Deborah Harry; Chris Stein

Deborah Harry singles chronology
"Kiss It Better" (1989)	"Brite Side" (1989)	"Sweet and Low" (1990)

Audio sample
- file; help

"Brite Side" is a 1989 song by the American singer-songwriter Deborah Harry, taken from her third solo album, Def, Dumb & Blonde. The single was only released in the UK, where it peaked at #59.

The song is featured prominently in the second season of the American television show Wiseguy starring Ken Wahl which featured Debbie Harry. The song was the cornerstone of the "Dead Dog Records Arc", where Harry played a singer named Diana Price who was trying to have one last hit. The song she "wrote" was "Brite Side". It was played heavily through the first two episodes of the arc ("Dead Dog Lives", "And It Comes Out Here").

== Track listing ==
All tracks (Deborah Harry/Chris Stein) unless otherwise noted.

UK 7", Poster Sleeve 7" & Cassette

1. "Brite Side" - 4:34
2. "Bugeye" - 4:06

UK 12", 12" Picture Disc & CD#1

1. "Brite Side" - 4:34
2. "In Love with Love" - 4:34
  - From the album Rockbird
3. "Bugeye" - 4:06

UK CD#2

1. "Brite Side" - 4:34
2. "French Kissin'" (Chuck Lorre) - 5:14
  - From the album Rockbird
3. "Bugeye" - 4:06

== Charts ==
Chart performance for "Brite Side"
Chart (1989)	Peak position
UK Singles (OCC)	59
