= Kiss It Better (Deborah Harry song) =

Single by Deborah Harry

from the album Def, Dumb & Blonde
- Released: 1989
- Recorded: 1989
- Genre: Pop
- Label: Sire Records (U.S.)
- Songwriters: Alannah Currie, Tom Bailey, Deborah Harry

Deborah Harry singles chronology
"I Want That Man" (1989)	"Kiss It Better" (1989)	"Brite Side" (1989)

Audio sample
- "Kiss It Better": file; help

"Kiss It Better" is a single from Deborah Harry's third solo album, Def, Dumb & Blonde in 1989. The single peaked at number 12 on the US Modern Rock chart, riding the wave of success built by Harry's previous single, "I Want That Man". Though never released commercially, a promo found its way to many college radio stations, hence the song charting so much lower than the previous one. The single was also not released in the UK.

"Sweet and Low"/"Kiss It Better" was released as a double A-side single in Australia in 1990.

== Charts ==
Chart performance for "Kiss It Better"
Chart (1990)	Peak position
US Alternative Airplay (Billboard)	12
