= Well, Did You Evah! =

Song by Betty Grable and Charles Walters

from the album DuBarry Was a Lady
- Released: December 6, 1939
- Genre: Show tunes
- Length: 6:21
- Songwriter: Cole Porter

"Well, Did You Evah!" is a song written by Cole Porter for his 1939 musical DuBarry Was a Lady, where it was introduced by Betty Grable and Charles Walters. It is written as a duet, with the pair exchanging bad news and each shrugging off the other's tidbits in favor of an aloof good time.

== Notable uses ==
- Originally appears in Broadway musical DuBarry Was a Lady (1939).
- Bing Crosby and Frank Sinatra in the movie High Society (recorded January 17, 1956). Likely the most well-known version of the song, it was added to the movie late in development, to give the two stars an opportunity to sing together.
- Debbie Harry and Iggy Pop recorded the song in 1990 for Red Hot + Blue, a compilation album released as part of an HIV/AIDS benefit project. Released as a single in the UK on December 24, 1990 but not the US. The single reached No. 42 in the UK Singles Chart, and No. 29 in the Irish chart.
- Revivals of DuBarry or its score were produced in New York, London and San Francisco in 1993, 1996, 2001, and 2014. The 2001 production was recorded by the BBC for broadcast in 2002. All included Well, Did You Evah! using the original lyrics.
- A cover of the song was performed on the album Swing When You're Winning by British singer Robbie Williams in collaboration with American actor and comedian Jon Lovitz.
- The song was parodied for use in Iceland's Christmas adverts in 2009, sung by Coleen Nolan and Jason Donovan.
- Marks & Spencer used it in their 2004 Christmas advert on what makes the perfect Christmas cocktail, starring Emma Chambers, Rupert Everett, Rachel Stevens, Martine McCutcheon, Gordon Ramsay and Helen Mirren.
- Kevin Kline and Ashley Judd sang it in the 2004 Cole Porter biopic De-Lovely.
