= Def, Dumb & Blonde =

Studio album by Deborah Harry
- Released: October 16, 1989
- Recorded: 1987–1989
- Genre: New wave; pop; pop rock; funk
- Length: 63:55 (CD)
- Label: Sire (US); Chrysalis (UK)
- Producer: Mike Chapman; Chris Stein; Deborah Harry; Toni C.; Tom Bailey; Arthur Baker; Eric Thorngren; Ben Grosse

Deborah Harry chronology
Once More into the Bleach (1988)	Def, Dumb & Blonde (1989)	The Complete Picture: The Very Best of Deborah Harry and Blondie (1991)

Professional ratings
Review scores
Source	Rating
AllMusic	4.5/5 stars
Robert Christgau	B+
Hi-Fi News & Record Review	A:1
New Musical Express	7/10
Record Mirror	3.5/5 stars
Smash Hits	8/10

Def, Dumb & Blonde is the third solo studio album by American singer Deborah Harry. Released in October 1989 on Sire Records in the US and Chrysalis Records in the UK, the album saw Harry revert from "Debbie" to "Deborah" as her professional name. Harry worked with a variety of producers on the album, including Tom Bailey of the Thompson Twins and Mike Chapman, who had previously produced the last four Blondie albums. "I wanted to do certain things that were reminiscent of Blondie," she stated.

It was also revealed that the original title of the album was "Dream Season" but it was changed due to a similarly titled Pat Benatar album – presumably the previous year's Wide Awake in Dreamland.

== Promotion and reception ==
The song "I Want That Man", written by Tom Bailey and Alannah Currie of the Thompson Twins, was released as the lead single. It made the Top 20 of the UK Singles Chart and was Harry's biggest solo chart success in Australia, where it reached number 2. Other singles released from the album included "Kiss It Better", "Brite Side", "Sweet and Low" and "Maybe for Sure". Ian Astbury sings backing vocals on two songs.

In late 1989, Harry toured extensively in Europe and the United States for the first time as a solo artist to support the album. Due to a lack of record company promotion, the album was not a commercial success in Harry's native United States, peaking at number 123 on the Billboard Hot 200 album chart. It performed better in Australia and the UK, peaking at numbers 10 and 12 respectively, and has been certified Silver by the BPI.

Hi-Fi News & Record Review commented that "The crucial returns that left this set far above her two previous (and disappointing) solo LPs are those of Chris Stein and producer Mike Chapman," (although Stein had actually been heavily involved as both a songwriter and musician in Harry's previous two solo LPs). The magazine awarded the album an "A:1" rating, noting that "[Stein] adds songwriting and instrumental punch to the songs, while Chapman's production sends the material flying from the speakers."

== Track listing ==
All tracks written by Deborah Harry and Chris Stein and produced by Mike Chapman, unless otherwise is noted. "Bike Boy and "Comic Books" are bonus tracks on both the cassette and CD versions; while "I'll Never Fall in Love" and "Forced to Live" are bonus tracks on the CD version only.

CD track listing
No.	Title	Writer(s)	Producer(s)	Length
1.	"I Want That Man"	Tom Bailey, Alannah Currie	Bailey, Eric Thorngren	3:43
2.	"Lovelight"	Chris Stein		3:56
3.	"Kiss It Better"	Bailey, Currie, Deborah Harry	Bailey, Thorngren	4:19
4.	"Bike Boy"			2:47
5.	"Get Your Way"			6:13
6.	"Maybe for Sure"			4:30
7.	"I'll Never Fall in Love"	Walter Ward, Thomas Bush		3:19
8.	"Calmarie"	Mario Tolédo, Naná Vasconcelos, Harry		4:42
9.	"Sweet and Low"	Toni C., Harry	Stein, Toni C., Harry	4:49
10.	"He Is So"			5:10
11.	"Bugeye"			4:06
12.	"Comic Books"	Miki Zone, Paul Zone, Armand Zone	Chapman	2:34
13.	"Forced to Live"	Harry, Leigh Foxx		2:02
14.	"Brite Side"		Stein, Harry	4:34
15.	"End of the Run"			7:04

Vinyl track listing
No.	Title	Writer(s)	Producer(s)	Length
1.	"I Want That Man"	Tom Bailey, Alannah Currie	Bailey, Eric Thorngren	3:43
2.	"Lovelight"	Chris Stein		3:56
3.	"Kiss It Better"	Bailey, Currie, Deborah Harry	Bailey, Thorngren	4:19
4.	"Maybe for Sure"			4:30
5.	"Calmarie"	Mario Tolédo, Naná Vasconcelos, Harry		4:42
6.	"Get Your Way"			6:13
7.	"Sweet and Low"	Toni C., Harry	Stein, Toni C., Harry	4:49
8.	"He Is So"			5:10
9.	"Brite Side"		Stein, Harry	4:34
10.	"Bugeye"			4:06
11.	"End of the Run"			7:04

Note: Side A runs from tracks 1–6 and side B from 7–11.

Cassette track listing
No.	Title	Writer(s)	Producer(s)	Length
1.	"I Want That Man"	Tom Bailey, Alannah Currie	Bailey, Eric Thorngren	3:43
2.	"Lovelight"	Chris Stein		3:56
3.	"Kiss It Better"	Bailey, Currie, Deborah Harry	Bailey, Thorngren	4:19
4.	"Bike Boy"			2:47
5.	"Get Your Way"			6:13
6.	"Maybe for Sure"			4:30
7.	"Calmarie"	Mario Tolédo, Naná Vasconcelos, Harry		4:42
8.	"Sweet and Low"	Toni C., Harry	Stein, Toni C., Harry	4:49
9.	"He Is So"			5:10
10.	"Bugeye"			4:06
11.	"Comic Books"	Mick Zone, Paul Zone, Armand Zone		2:34
12.	"Brite Side"		Stein, Harry	4:34
13.	"End of the Run"			7:04

Note: Side A runs from tracks 1–7 and side B from 8–13.

== Personnel ==
- Deborah Harry – vocals
- Phil Ashley – keyboards, synthesizer programming
- Steve Goldstein – keyboards
- Tom Bailey – Fairlight CMI (1, 3)
- David Bravo – keyboards (9), programming (9)
- Toni C. (Antoinette Colandero) – keyboards (9), programming (9)
- Johann Brundquist – keyboard overdubs (9)
- Bobby Khozouri – keyboards (14)
- Mac Quayle – keyboards (14)
- Chris Stein – guitars, musical arrangements, backing vocals (4), all other instruments (14)
- Leigh Foxx – bass guitar
- Terry Bozzio – drums
- Geoff Dugmore – drums (1, 3)
- Thommy Price – drums
- Arthur Baker – drums (14)
- Paulinho da Costa – percussion (8)
- Ian Astbury – backing vocals (2)
- Mike Chapman – backing vocals (4)
- Gary Valentine – backing vocals (4)
- Adele Bertei – backing vocals (9)
- Arif St. Michael – backing vocals (9)
- Biti Strauchn – backing vocals (9)
- Dennis Christopher – backing vocals (13)
- Keith Primi – backing vocals (13)

=== Production ===
- Tom Bailey – producer (1, 3), mixing (1, 3)
- Eric "E.T." Thorngren – producer (1, 3), mixing (1, 3)
- Ben Grosse – additional production (1), remixing (1)
- Mike Chapman – producer (2, 4–8, 10–13, 15), mixing (2, 4–8, 10–13, 15)
- Toni C. – producer (9)
- Deborah Harry – producer (9, 14)
- Chris Stein – producing assistance, producer (9, 14)
- Arthur Baker – additional production (9, 14), additional mixing (9, 14)
- Mike O'Hora – engineer (for Deborah Harry and Chris Stein)
- George Tutko – engineer (2, 4–8, 10–13, 15)
- James "Doc" Dougherty – engineer (9)
- Rob Paustian – mix engineer (9)
- Steve Peck – engineer (14)
- Paul McKenna – mix engineer (14)
- Mike Kloster – studio assistance
- Arthur Elgort – photography
- Deborah Norcross – art direction, design
- Jeri Helden – art direction, design
- Gary Kurfirst – management

== Charts ==
Chart performance for Def, Dumb & Blonde
Chart (1989)	Peak position
Australian Albums (ARIA)	10
European Albums (Music & Media)	53
New Zealand Albums (RMNZ)	9
UK Albums (OCC)	12
US Billboard 200	123
