= Chris Stein =

American guitarist

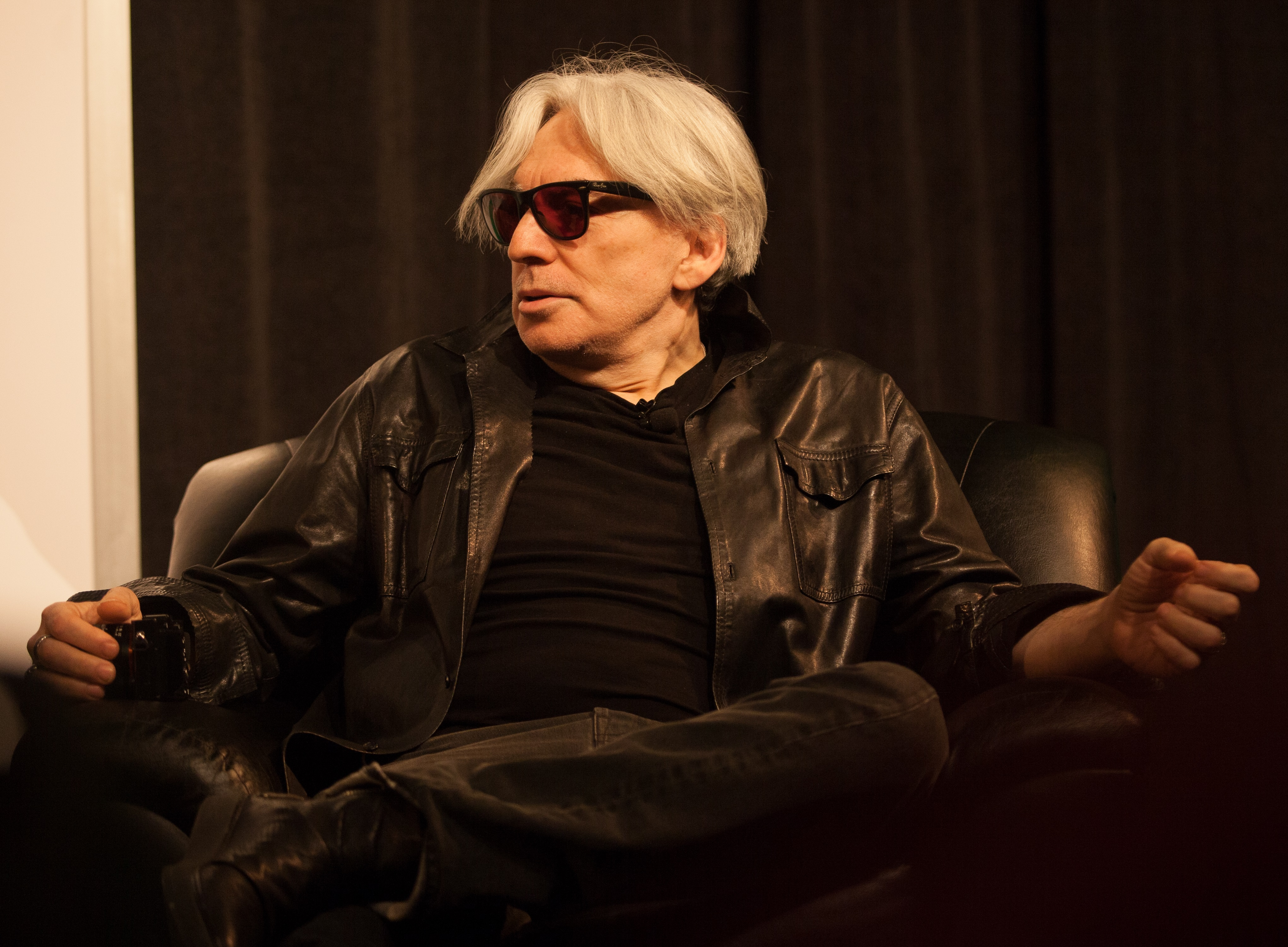
- Stein at SXSW in 2014

Background information
- Born: Christopher Stein; January 5, 1950 (age 76); Brooklyn, New York, U.S.
- Genres: New wave; pop rock; punk rock
- Occupations: Musician; songwriter
- Instruments: Guitar; bass
- Years active: 1970s–present
- Member of: Blondie
- Spouse: Barbara Sicuranza (m. 1999)
- Website: chrisstein.nyc

Christopher Stein (born January 5, 1950) is an American musician and songwriter known as the co-founder and guitarist of the new wave band Blondie. He is also a producer and performer for the classic soundtrack of the 1982 hip hop film Wild Style, and writer of the soundtrack for the 1980 film Union City, as well as an accomplished photographer.

== Early life ==
Stein was born to Jewish atheist parents in Brooklyn, New York, on January 5, 1950. He grew up in the Midwood section of Brooklyn and attended Midwood High School in Brooklyn, but he was expelled for his long hair. His father, Ben, was a Russian immigrant. His mother, Estelle, had Armenian-Romanian heritage. When Stein was 15 years old, his father died of a heart attack at the age of 55.

== Music ==
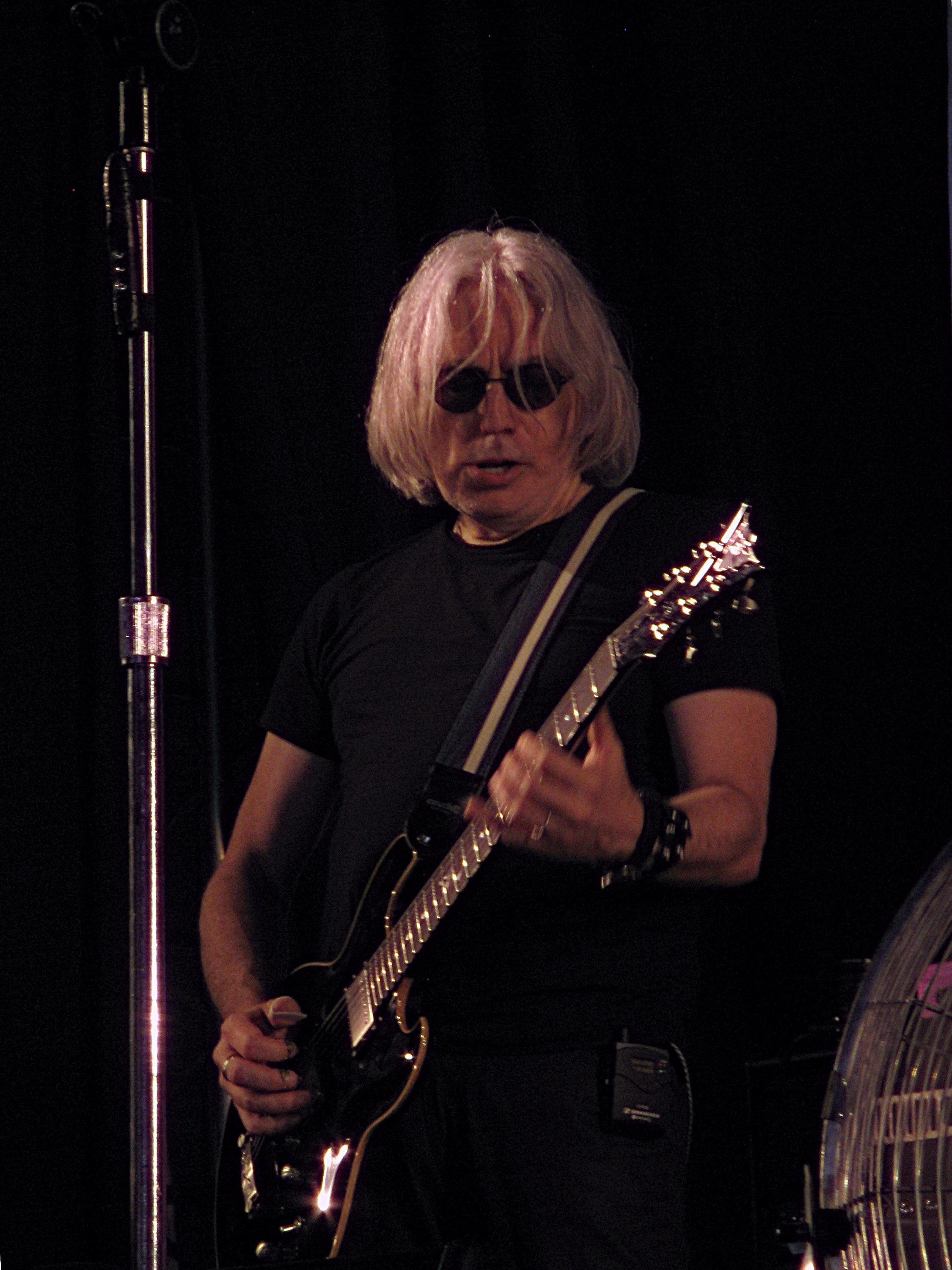
Stein performing with Blondie in 2011

In 1973, Stein became the guitarist of the Stillettoes and began a romantic relationship with Debbie Harry, one of the singers. In the summer of 1974, Stein, Harry, and the band's rhythm section left to start their own group which they eventually called Blondie. They soon became fixtures in the punk and new wave scene centered around CBGB and Max's Kansas City, and by the end of the decade achieved international stardom.

Stein was co-host of TV Party, a public-access television cable TV show in New York City, that ran from 1978 to 1982.

Blondie broke up in 1982, but reformed in 1997 and has been active off and on ever since. In addition to being the sole writer of the Blondie song "Sunday Girl", Stein co-wrote numerous hits with Harry, including "Heart of Glass", "Dreaming", "Island of Lost Souls", "Rapture", and "Rip Her to Shreds". Stein also ran the Animal Records label between 1982 and 1984.

In 2015, Blondie members Debbie Harry and Chris Stein made a guest appearance alongside The Gregory Brothers in an episode of Songify the News, and they collaborated again to parody the 2016 United States presidential election debates.

== Photography and writing ==
A photographer, Stein documented the early New York City punk music scene, the visual allure of Debbie Harry and Blondie, and his collaborations with artists including Andy Warhol and H.R. Giger. Stein's photography was published in September 2014 by Rizzoli in his book, Chris Stein / Negative: Me, Blondie, and the Advent of Punk. Stein was a contributing photographer to Punk magazine between 1976 and 1979 - often using it to promote Blondie.

The book Negative: Me, Blondie and the Advent of Punk was launched with an exhibition curated by Jeffrey Deitch at the Chelsea Hotel's Storefront Gallery in New York City alongside images by the likes of Mick Rock, Bob Gruen, Annie Leibovitz and Robert Mapplethorpe, which also coincided with the fortieth anniversary of the formation of Blondie. There was also an exhibition at Somerset House in London. Some of the photographs in Negative have also been published in the Debbie Harry, Chris Stein and Victor Bockris co-authored volume Making Tracks: The Rise of Blondie, first published by Elm Tree, London (1982). Making Tracks was later reissued by Da Capo, New York (1998).

Stein's photography has also been shown in an exhibition at the Morrison Hotel Gallery, West Hollywood in August 2013; in a joint exhibition with Eddie Duggan at the University of Suffolk (April–May 2017), entitled A la recherche du punk perdu, and in an exhibition in a Blondie 'pop-up' shop in London's Camden Market, linked to the 2017 Blondie performance at the Roundhouse.

A second book of Stein's photography, H.R. Giger: Debbie Harry Metamorphosis: Creating the Visual Concept for KooKoo, chronicling the collaboration between himself, Debbie Harry, and H.R. Giger for Harry's 1981 solo album was published by Titan Books on April 18, 2023.

Stein authored a third book, Under a Rock, a memoir that he wrote himself over the course of a few years. It was published on June 11, 2024, by St. Martin's Press, an imprint of Macmillan Publishing.

== Personal life ==
In 1982, Stein was diagnosed with pemphigus vulgaris, a rare autoimmune disease of the skin, and was cared for by his then-partner Debbie Harry. Stein had developed a mild form of the disease, and was able to control it with a program of steroids.

During his 13-year relationship with Harry, they both became addicted to heroin and the IRS seized their assets due to unpaid tax. While participating in a methadone treatment program, Stein said he became a "model patient," eventually earning the privilege of no longer reporting daily. After spending several years without leaving Manhattan, he visited writer William S. Burroughs for two weeks at his home in Lawrence, Kansas in 1986.

Stein and Harry separated in February 1987; Stein attributed the breakup in part to them drifting apart and differing stages of recovery. Despite their breakup, they remained close friends, and Harry is the godmother of Stein's two daughters.

In 1999, Stein married actress Barbara Sicuranza, with whom he has two daughters. Stein's daughter Akira struggled with substance abuse and died of a fentanyl overdose at the age of 19 in May 2023.

In 2011, Stein described himself as "an animist. I'm kind of in there with the American Indians - I believe everything has a life force. I'm not an organised religion-type person."

Stein has not toured with Blondie since 2019 due to heart issues, but has remained active with the band. About his health condition, he stated: "I've been dealing with a dumbass condition called Atrial Fibrillation or AFib which is irregular heartbeats and combined with the meds I take for it I'm too fatigued to deal."

== Discography ==
With Blondie

- Blondie (1976)
- Plastic Letters (1978)
- Parallel Lines (1978)
- Eat to the Beat (1979)
- Autoamerican (1980)
- The Hunter (1982)
- No Exit (1999)
- The Curse of Blondie (2003)
- Panic of Girls (2011)
- Ghosts of Download (2014)
- Pollinator (2017)
- High Noon (2027)

With Debbie Harry

- KooKoo (1981)
- Rockbird (1986)
- Def, Dumb & Blonde (1989)
- Debravation (1993)
- Necessary Evil (2007)

With Jimmy Destri

- Heart on a Wall (1981)

With Iggy Pop

- Zombie Birdhouse (1982)

With The Gun Club

- Miami (1982)

== See also ==
- List of Rock and Roll Hall of Fame inductees
