= The Complete Picture: The Very Best of Deborah Harry and Blondie =

Greatest hits album by Deborah Harry and Blondie
- Released: March 4, 1991
- Recorded: 1976–1990
- Genre: New wave
- Length: 74:20
- Label: Chrysalis
- Producer: Various

Deborah Harry chronology
Def, Dumb & Blonde (1989)	The Complete Picture: The Very Best of Deborah Harry and Blondie (1991)	Debravation (1993)

Blondie chronology
Once More into the Bleach (1988)	The Complete Picture: The Very Best of Deborah Harry and Blondie (1991)	Blonde and Beyond (1993)

Professional ratings
Review scores
Source	Rating
AllMusic	4/5 stars
Q Magazine	3/5 stars

The Complete Picture: The Very Best of Deborah Harry and Blondie is a greatest hits album released on March 4, 1991, by Chrysalis Records. It contained all of Blondie's highest-charting singles such as "Heart of Glass", "Sunday Girl", "The Tide Is High", "Atomic", and "Call Me", as well as some of Deborah Harry's solo singles, including the UK top-10 single "French Kissin' in the USA".

== Overview ==
The Complete Picture reached number three on the UK Album Chart, remaining on the chart for 25 weeks, and was certified gold by the British Phonographic Industry (BPI). The album was released as a double vinyl LP, containing five tracks on each side. However, for the compact disc format, all 20 tracks were released on one CD.

A video collection was also released. It omits "Sunday Girl" and "Rip Her to Shreds" since there are no official promo videos for them, though several tracks not present on the album were included such as Deborah Harry's "Backfired" and "Now I Know You Know" (from her 1981 album KooKoo), "Free to Fall" (from 1986's Rockbird), and Blondie's videos for "The Hardest Part" (1979) and "Detroit 442" (1978).

== Track listing ==
CD
No.	Title	Writer(s)	Performed by	Length
1.	"Heart of Glass" (Faded The Best of Blondie Version)	Debbie Harry, Chris Stein	Blondie	3:58
2.	"I Want That Man"	Tom Bailey, Alannah Currie	Deborah Harry	3:41
3.	"Call Me"	Harry, Giorgio Moroder	Blondie	3:28
4.	"Sunday Girl"	Stein	Blondie	3:02
5.	"French Kissin' in the USA" (Album Version)	Chuck Lorre	Debbie Harry	5:10
6.	"Denis"	Neil Levenson	Blondie	2:18
7.	"Rapture" (The Best of Blondie Version)	Harry, Stein	Blondie	5:33
8.	"Brite Side"	Harry, Stein	Deborah Harry	4:34
9.	"(I'm Always Touched by Your) Presence, Dear"	Gary Valentine	Blondie	2:41
10.	"Well Did You Evah!"	Cole Porter	Debbie Harry & Iggy Pop	3:27
11.	"The Tide Is High" (Album Version)	John Holt	Blondie	4:35
12.	"In Love with Love" (Album Version)	Harry, Stein	Debbie Harry	4:30
13.	"Hanging on the Telephone"	Jack Lee	Blondie	2:22
14.	"Island of Lost Souls" (7" Edit)	Harry, Stein	Blondie	3:49
15.	"Picture This"	Jimmy Destri, Harry, Stein	Blondie	2:56
16.	"Dreaming"	Harry, Stein	Blondie	3:03
17.	"Sweet and Low" (Phil Harding Single Mix)	Toni C., Harry	Debbie Harry	4:18
18.	"Union City Blue"	Nigel Harrison, Harry	Blondie	3:20
19.	"Atomic" (Album Version)	Destri, Harry	Blondie	4:38
20.	"Rip Her to Shreds"	Harry, Stein	Blondie	3:19
Total length:				74:20

VHS
No.	Title	Writer(s)	Length
1.	"Heart of Glass"	Harry, Stein	3:58
2.	"I Want That Man"	Bailey, Currie	3:41
3.	"Denis"	Levenson	2:18
4.	"Call Me"	Harry, Moroder	3:28
5.	"French Kissin' in the USA"	Lorre	5:10
6.	"Hanging on the Telephone"	Lee	2:22
7.	"Sweet and Low"	Toni C., Harry	4:18
8.	"The Tide Is High"	Holt	4:35
9.	"In Love with Love"	Harry, Stein	4:30
10.	"(I'm Always Touched by Your) Presence, Dear"	Valentine	2:41
11.	"Brite Side"	Harry, Stein	4:34
12.	"Picture This"	Destri, Harry, Stein	2:56
13.	"Rapture"	Harry, Stein	4:57
14.	"Backfired"	Bernard Edwards, Nile Rodgers	3:34
15.	"Now I Know You Know"	Edwards, Rodgers	5:31
16.	"Free to Fall"	Harry, Seth Justman	5:31
17.	"The Hardest Part"	Harry, Stein	3:42
18.	"Detroit 442"	Destri, Stein	2:24
19.	"Atomic"	Destri, Harry	4:38
20.	"Union City Blue"	Harrison, Harry	3:20
21.	"Dreaming"	Harry, Stein	3:03
22.	"Island of Lost Souls"	Harry, Stein	3:49
23.	"Well Did You Evah!" (with Iggy Pop)	Porter	3:27

== Charts ==
=== Weekly charts ===
Weekly chart performance for The Complete Picture: The Very Best of Deborah Harry and Blondie
Chart (1991)	Peak position
Australian Albums (ARIA)	6
Dutch Albums (Album Top 100)	42
European Albums (Music & Media)	18
New Zealand Albums (RMNZ)	1
UK Albums (Official Charts)	3

=== Year-end charts ===
Year-end chart performance for The Complete Picture: The Very Best of Deborah Harry and Blondie
Chart (1991)	Position
New Zealand Albums (RMNZ)	6
UK Albums (OCC)	60

== Certifications ==
Region	Certification	Certified units/sales
Australia (ARIA)	Gold	35,000^{^}
New Zealand (RMNZ)	Platinum	15,000^{^}
United Kingdom (BPI)	Gold	100,000^{^}
^{^} Shipments figures based on certification alone.
