= I Can See Clearly =

1993 single by Deborah Harry

Single by Deborah Harry

from the album Debravation
- Released: June 21, 1993
- Length: 3:52
- Label: Sire, Reprise (US); Chrysalis Records (intl.)
- Songwriters: Arthur Baker; Tony McIlwaine
- Producer: Arthur Baker

Deborah Harry singles chronology
"Well Did You Evah!" (1991)	"I Can See Clearly" (1993)	"Strike Me Pink" (1993)

Music video
- "I Can See Clearly" on YouTube

Audio sample
- "I Can See Clearly": file; help

"I Can See Clearly" is a song by American singer Debbie Harry, released in June 1993 as the first single from her fourth solo album, Debravation (1993).

== Release ==
After taking a brief hiatus from her solo music career, Harry released the track as the first single from her fourth solo album, Debravation, on June 21, 1993. The single brought her back the attention of US Dance Clubs and peaked at number two on the US Billboard Dance Club Play chart. It was also a moderate success in the United Kingdom, where it reached number 23 in July 1993. The single also peaked at number 96 on the Australian ARIA Singles Chart in September 1993.

== Critical reception ==
Ian McCann from NME wrote that "the '70s answer to Virginia Bottomley returns with a record in several bizarre mixes, none of which seem like a hit." He added that, although the song is "duller than a-day old turd", "the voice that adolescent boys once swooned for is still perfectly intact". Adam Higginbotham from Select described it as "a disco pastiche" of U2's "Bullet the Blue Sky".

== Track listings ==
All tracks were written by Arthur Baker and Tony McIlwaine unless otherwise noted.

US seven-track CD

1. "I Can See Clearly" (single version) – 3:58
2. "I Can See Clearly" (the club mix) – 7:51
3. "I Can See Clearly" (Boriqua Tribal mix) – 4:30
4. "I Can See Clearly" (Blonde Rave) – 4:38
5. "I Can See Clearly" (Dub-A-Mental) – 4:37
6. "I Can See Clearly" (Hot Single mix) – 4:32
7. "I Can See Clearly" (N.Y.C. dub) – 4:37

UK CD1

1. "I Can See Clearly" (album version) – 3:52
2. "Atomic" (Harry, Stein) – 4:35
  - Blondie: original version from 1979 album Eat to the Beat
3. " Heart of Glass" (Harry, Stein) – 3:58
  - Blondie: faded The Best of Blondie version, original version appears on Parallel Lines

UK CD2

1. "I Can See Clearly" (Shakedown Mix) – 3:52
2. "Call Me" (Moroder, Harry) – 3:30
  - Blondie: original 1980 7-inch edit from The Best of Blondie
3. "In Love with Love" (Phil Harding 7-inch edit) (Harry, Stein) – 3:20
  - Original version available on 1986 album Rockbird

UK 12-inch

1. "I Can See Clearly" (D:reamix) – 6:45
2. "I Can See Clearly" (D:ream instrumental) – 6:46
3. "I Can See Clearly" (Deep South mix) – 5:55
4. "I Can See Clearly" (Murk Habana dub) – 5:36

European CD, UK cassette

1. "I Can See Clearly" (album version) – 3:52
2. "Standing In My Way" (Foxx, Harry) – 4:24
  - Non-album version, guest vocals Joey Ramone

European Maxi CD

1. "I Can See Clearly" (album version) – 3:52
2. "I Can See Clearly" (D:Reamix) – 6:45
3. "I Can See Clearly" (Deep South Mixy) – 5:55

== Charts ==
=== Weekly charts ===
Weekly chart performance for "I Can See Clearly"
Chart (1993)	Peak position
Australia (ARIA)	96
Europe (Eurochart Hot 100)	63
UK Singles (Official Charts)	23
UK Airplay (Music Week)	34
US Dance Club Songs (Billboard)	2
US Dance Singles Sales (Billboard)	49

=== Year-end charts ===
Year-end chart performance for "I Can See Clearly"
Chart (1993)	Position
US Dance Club Play (Billboard)	47
