= Beautiful: The Remix Album =

Remix album by Blondie
- Released: June 18, 1995
- Genre: House; techno
- Label: Chrysalis/EMI Records (UK); Disky (Netherlands)

Blondie chronology
The Platinum Collection (1994)	Beautiful: The Remix Album (1995)	Remixed Remade Remodeled: The Remix Project (1995)

Beautiful: The Remix Album is a remix album of recordings by American band Blondie, released by Chrysalis/EMI Records in the UK during 1995. Several remix singles were released from the album in various formats: "Atomic" '94, which reached number 19 in the UK Singles Chart the previous year, "Heart of Glass" '95, which reached number 15, and "Union City Blue" '95 which reached number 31.

The album was re-released by Dutch budget label Disky in 1999.

== Critical reception ==
Professional ratings
Review scores
Source	Rating
Muzik	0/5 stars
NME	4/10

Upon its release, Andrew Mueller of Melody Maker called the album an "even more heinous and pointless desecration" of Blondie's material than on their previous remix album Once More into the Bleach (1988) and noted that those involved have "just basically put on their pantomime bull outfits and bolted through Blondie's china shop". He concluded, "If Beautiful precipitates a full-scale Blondie revival, then the ends will just about justify the means. If not, then Chrysalis would be best advised to cease trying to fix what isn't broken." Dele Fadele of NME noted how "various clubland luminaries have re-score[d] your favourite memories in electronic Technicolor, to hideously variable effect" and concluded, "The fact remains that the past should be allowed to remain untarnished, and anyone who wants to discover Blondie only need trawl through secondhand shops to get full satisfaction." He picked "Union City Blue" and "Dreaming" as two tracks which "survive [their] mauling, thanks to the pop sensibilities of the hired hands involved" and noted "Fade Away and Radiate" as a "futuristic noir chiller", but felt the rest of the tracks "give 'bilge' a new meaning".

== Track listing ==
No.	Title	Writer(s)	Remixer(s)	Length
1.	"Union City Blue" (Diddy's Power & Passion Mix)	Debbie Harry; Nigel Harrison	Diddy	8:36
2.	"Dreaming" (Utah Saints Mix)	Harry; Chris Stein	Utah Saints	6:22
3.	"Rapture" (K-Klassic Radio Mix)	Harry; Stein	K-Klass	4:22
4.	"Heart of Glass" (Diddy's Adorable Illusion Mix)	Harry; Stein	Diddy	7:28
5.	"Sunday Girl" (Hardly Handbag Mix)	Stein	Craig Burger Queen	7:36
6.	"Call Me" (Debbie Does Dallas)	Harry; Giorgio Moroder	Blu Peter	6:19
7.	"Atomic" (Diddy's 12" Mix)	Harry; Jimmy Destri	Diddy	6:51
8.	"The Tide Is High" (Sand Dollar Mix)	John Holt	Peter Arden; Vinny Vero	7:04
9.	"Hanging on the Telephone" (Nose Bleed Handbag Mix)	Jack Lee	Blu Peter	6:12
10.	"Fade Away and Radiate" (108 BPM Mix)	Stein	The Black Dog	5:19
11.	"Dreaming" (The Sub-Urban Dream Mix)	Harry; Stein	Tommy Musto	5:59
12.	"Atomic" (Armand's Short Circuit Mix)	Harry; Destri	Armand Van Helden	5:08

== Personnel ==
- Original producer: Mike Chapman (tracks 1–5, 7–12), Giorgio Moroder (track 6)

"Union City Blue" (Diddy's Power and Passion Mix):

- Engineer – Andy Allder

"Dreaming" (Utah Saints Mix):

- Engineer (mix engineer) – Guy Hatton

"Call Me" (Debbie Does Dallas):

- Programmer, engineer (remix engineer) – Mick Shiner

"Atomic" (Diddy's 12" Mix):

- Engineer – Republica

"The Tide Is High" (Sand Dollar Mix):

- Engineer, mixer – Guido Osorio

"Hanging on the Telephone" (Nose Bleed Handbag Mix):

- Programmer, engineer (remix engineer) – Mick Shiner

"Dreaming" (The Sub-Urban Dream Mix):

- Engineer (Co-engineered), mixed by (co-mixed by) – Matthias Heilbronn
- Keyboards – Mac Quayle

== Charts ==
Chart (1995)	Peak position
UK Albums (OCC)	25
