= Rush Rush (Debbie Harry song) =

1983 single performed by Debbie Harry

- US picture sleeve

Single by Debbie Harry

from the album Scarface: Music from the Original Motion Picture Soundtrack
- Released: November 1983
- Genre: Post-disco
- Length: 3:37
- Label: Chrysalis
- Composer: Giorgio Moroder
- Lyricist: Debbie Harry
- Producer: Giorgio Moroder

Debbie Harry singles chronology
| "Chrome" (1981) | "Rush Rush" (1983) | "Feel the Spin" (1985) |

Audio sample
- Rush Rush: file; help

"Rush Rush" is a song written by Italian composer and music producer Giorgio Moroder and performed by American singer Debbie Harry. It was released as the fourth and final single from the soundtrack to the epic crime drama film Scarface (1983).

== Background ==
"Rush Rush" was the first single Harry released after Blondie broke up in 1982, and was one of the several projects she worked on in between her debut and second solo studio album. It was Harry's second collaboration with Italian producer Giorgio Moroder, the first being Blondie's 1980 number-one single "Call Me" (from the 1980 film American Gigolo). The song was a reference to drug use, "llello" being a Spanish colloquialism for cocaine.

== Release and reception ==
"Rush Rush" was released both as a 7-inch single and an extended 12-inch, the A-side of which would later be included on the Debbie Harry and Blondie remix album Once More into the Bleach (1988), as well as Harry's compilation album Most of All: The Best of Deborah Harry (1999). A music video was produced, but it was primarily a montage of clips from Harry's past videos including ones from Blondie.

In the United States, "Rush Rush" peaked at No. 105 on the US Bubbling Under Hot 100 chart and No. 28 on the Dance/Disco Top 80 chart. The single also peaked at No. 87 on the UK singles chart.

== Uses in media ==
The song was also featured in the action-adventure game Grand Theft Auto III (2001) on the fictional in-game radio station "Flashback 95.6" (Flashback FM) alongside four other songs from the Scarface soundtrack. The song also appears in the comedy film The Money Pit (1986), starring Tom Hanks. It was also used in the action-adventure video game Scarface: The World Is Yours (2006).

== Other versions ==
The song was covered by the English alternative dance band Happy Mondays for their fifth studio album Uncle Dysfunktional (2007). The song was also sampled by American hip-hop group and production duo the Beatnuts for their 2002 song "Yae Yo". In 2008, Septimus Orion covered the song on its debut studio album, Caged, which also features a remix of "Rush Rush" called the "Trip mix".

== Track listing ==
- US 7-inch single

A. "Rush Rush" – 3:33
B. "Dance Dance Dance" (performed by Beth Andersen) – 2:41

- UK 7-inch single

A. "Rush Rush" – 3:33
B. "Rush Rush" (dub version) – 3:26

- US and UK 12-inch single

A. "Rush Rush" (extended version) – 4:45
B. "Rush Rush" (extended dub version) – 4:45

== Charts ==
Chart performance for "Rush Rush"
| Chart (1983–1984) | Peak position |
|---|---|
| Australia (Kent Music Report) | 25 |
| Canada Top Singles (RPM) | 42 |
| Finland (Suomen virallinen lista) | 17 |
| New Zealand (Recorded Music NZ) | 39 |
| UK Singles (Official Charts) | 87 |
| US Bubbling Under the Hot 100 (Billboard) | 105 |
| US Dance Club Songs (Billboard) | 28 |
