= Once More into the Bleach =

Remix album by Debbie Harry and Blondie
- Released: 5 December 1988
- Recorded: 1978–1988
- Genres: Rock; pop; new wave
- Length: 70:34
- Label: Chrysalis

Debbie Harry chronology
Rockbird (1986)	Once More into the Bleach (1988)	Def, Dumb & Blonde (1989)

Blondie chronology
The Hunter (1982)	Once More into the Bleach (1988)	The Complete Picture: The Very Best of Deborah Harry and Blondie (1991)

Singles from Once More into the Bleach
- 1. "Denis (Dancin' Danny D Remix)" Released: 1988; 2. "Heart of Glass (Shep Pettibone Remix)" Released: 1988 (Australia and France oly); 3. "Call Me (Ben Liebrand Remix)" Released: 1989

Professional ratings
Review scores
Source	Rating
AllMusic	3/5 stars
Record Mirror	1.5/5 stars
Robert Christgau	C+

Once More into the Bleach is a remix album released in December 1988 by the band Blondie and Debbie Harry. The 13-track compilation contains remixes of Blondie songs and material from Harry's solo career. It was the first compilation to include non-album singles "Rush Rush" (from the Scarface soundtrack) and "Feel the Spin" (from the Krush Groove soundtrack).

== Overview ==
The title of the album is a pun on a line from Henry V, a history play by William Shakespeare, "once more unto the breach", with a nod to hair bleach.

The album was issued as a double vinyl, double cassette album, and on CD. On the US edition of the album track five "Rapture" (Bonus Beats) is replaced with the original version of "Atomic" from the album Eat to the Beat.

Once More into the Bleach spun off two single releases: "Denis", a remix by Dancin' Danny D which is the first official Blondie remix single (also known as "Denis '88") and "Call Me", a remix by Ben Liebrand. The singles reached numbers 50 and 61 on the UK Singles Chart respectively. The Shep Pettibone remix of "Heart of Glass" had a limited release as a single in several territories.

== Track listing ==
UK edition
No.	Title	Writer(s)	Original artist	Length
1.	"Denis" (Dancin' Danny D Remix)	Neil Levenson	Blondie	5:20
2.	"Heart of Glass" (Shep Pettibone Remix)	Debbie Harry, Chris Stein	Blondie	6:40
3.	"Call Me" (Ben Liebrand Remix)	Giorgio Moroder, Harry	Blondie	7:00
4.	"Rapture" (Teddy Riley and Gene Griffin Remix)	Harry, Stein	Blondie	6:58
5.	"Rapture" (Bonus Beats) (Teddy Riley and Gene Griffin Remix)	Harry, Stein	Blondie	2:22
6.	"The Tide Is High" (Coldcut Remix)	John Holt, Howard Barrett, Tyrone Evans	Blondie	5:35
7.	"The Jam Was Moving" (Chris Stein and Debbie Harry Remix)	Nile Rodgers, Bernard Edwards	Debbie Harry	3:28
8.	"In Love with Love" (Justin Strauss and Murray Elias Remix)	Harry, Stein	Debbie Harry	7:12
9.	"Rush Rush" (12" extended version)	Moroder, Harry	Debbie Harry	4:45
10.	"French Kissin' in the USA" (French version)	Chuck Lorre	Debbie Harry	5:10
11.	"Feel the Spin" (extended dance version)	John Benitez, Toni C., Harry	Debbie Harry	6:50
12.	"Backfired" (Bruce Forrest and Frank Heller Remix)	Rodgers, Edwards	Debbie Harry	6:03
13.	"Sunday Girl" (French version)	Stein	Blondie	3:11

European edition
No.	Title	Writer(s)	Original artist	Length
1.	"Rapture" (Teddy Riley and Gene Griffin Remix)	Harry, Stein	Blondie	6:58
2.	"Call Me" (Ben Liebrand Remix)	Moroder, Harry	Blondie	7:00
3.	"Heart of Glass" (Shep Pettibone Remix)	Harry, Stein	Blondie	6:40
4.	"The Tide Is High" (Coldcut Remix)	Holt, Barrett, Evans	Blondie	5:35
5.	"Denis" (Dancin' Danny D Remix)	Levenson	Blondie	5:20
6.	"Feel the Spin" (extended dance mix)	Benitez, Toni C., Harry	Debbie Harry	6:50
7.	"In Love with Love" (Justin Strauss and Murray Elias Remix)	Harry, Stein	Debbie Harry	7:12
8.	"Backfired" (Bruce Forrest and Frank Heller Remix)	Rodgers, Edwards	Debbie Harry	6:03
9.	"French Kissin' in the USA" (French version)	Chuck Lorre	Debbie Harry	5:10

US edition
No.	Title	Writer(s)	Original artist	Length
1.	"Denis" (Dancin' Danny D Remix)	Neil Levenson	Blondie	5:20
2.	"Heart of Glass" (disco version)	Debbie Harry, Chris Stein	Blondie	5:50
3.	"Call Me" (Ben Liebrand Remix)	Giorgio Moroder, Harry	Blondie	7:00
4.	"Rapture" (Teddy Riley and Gene Griffin Remix)	Harry, Stein	Blondie	6:58
5.	"Atomic" (LP Version)	Harry, Destri	Blondie	4:39
6.	"The Tide Is High" (Coldcut Remix)	John Holt, Howard Barrett, Tyrone Evans	Blondie	5:35
7.	"The Jam Was Moving" (Chris Stein and Debbie Harry Remix)	Nile Rodgers, Bernard Edwards	Debbie Harry	3:28
8.	"In Love with Love" (Heart of Fire Mix)	Harry, Stein	Debbie Harry	7:12
9.	"Rush Rush" (12" extended version)	Moroder, Harry	Debbie Harry	4:45
10.	"French Kissin' in the USA" (French version)	Chuck Lorre	Debbie Harry	5:10
11.	"Feel the Spin" (extended dance version)	John Benitez, Toni C., Harry	Debbie Harry	6:50
12.	"Backfired" (Bruce Forrest and Frank Heller Remix)	Rodgers, Edwards	Debbie Harry	6:03
13.	"Sunday Girl" (French version)	Stein	Blondie	3:11

== Personnel ==
- Richard Gottehrer - producer ("Denis")
- Mike Chapman - producer ("Heart of Glass", "Rapture", "The Tide Is High" and "Sunday Girl")
- Giorgio Moroder - producer ("Call Me" and "Rush Rush")
- Bernard Edwards - producer ("The Jam Was Moving" and "Backfired")
- Nile Rodgers - producer ("The Jam Was Moving" and "Backfired")
- Seth Justman - producer ("In Love with Love" and "French Kissin' in the USA")
- John Benitez - producer ("Feel the Spin")

== Charts ==
Chart (1989)	Peak position
Australian Albums (ARIA)	47
UK Albums (Official Charts)	50
US Dance Club Songs (Billboard)	46
