= Tony's Theme =

Tony's Theme may refer to:

- "Tony's Theme", an instrumental by Giorgio Moroder from the soundtrack of the 1983 film Scarface
- "Tony's Theme", a song by the Pixies from the album Surfer Rosa
