= Union City Blue =

Single by Blondie

from the album Eat to the Beat
- B-side: "Living In The Real World"; "I Feel Love"
- Released: November 23, 1979
- Genre: New wave; power pop
- Length: 3:23
- Label: Chrysalis (UK)
- Songwriters: Deborah Harry; Nigel Harrison
- Producer: Mike Chapman

Blondie singles chronology
"Dreaming" (1979)	"Union City Blue" (1979)	"The Hardest Part" (1980)

Audio sample
- Union City Blue: file; help

Music video
- "Union City Blue" on YouTube

"Union City Blue" is a song by the American new wave band Blondie. The song was featured on their 1979 studio album Eat to the Beat. Written by Debbie Harry and Nigel Harrison, the song was inspired lyrically by Harry's experiences while acting in the 1980 film Union City as well as her New Jersey roots. Musically, the song features a drum part composed by drummer Clem Burke.

"Union City Blue" was released in the UK and Europe as the second single from Eat to the Beat, reaching number 13 on the UK Singles Chart. The single was not released in the US, despite drummer Burke's later assertion that the song would have been a good single release. The release was accompanied by a music video filmed aerially at the Union Dry Dock in Weehawken, New Jersey. The song has since seen critical acclaim and a remixed version saw commercial success in the 1990s.

== Background ==
"Union City Blue" was cowritten by singer Debbie Harry and bassist Nigel Harrison. Harry based the lyrics and title of the song on her experiences acting in the 1980 movie Union City, which she had appeared in as Lillian. According to Harry, she wrote the lyrics one evening during a break in the shooting. Director Marcus Reichert later recalled that Harry was not allowed to sing on the film's soundtrack for contractual reasons, so the song did not appear in the film. Harry, who was raised in New Jersey, had also performed as a go-go dancer in Union City before finding success with Blondie.

Musically, Harry described the song as "one of Nigel's English drinking songs." Blondie drummer Clem Burke later stated that the song reflected the band's New York origins. Burke composed the drum part himself; he recalled, "I come up with my parts generally, and things like 'Union City' or 'Dreaming', those were my parts, yeah." Burke named the song as a favorite to perform, stating, "I definitely enjoy playing that."

== Release ==
The song was released as the second single from the album in the United Kingdom, where it reached number 13 in the UK Singles Chart in late 1979. The song was never released as a single in the US; Popdose later wrote of this decision, "While 'The Hardest Part' is a great album cut, it's not exactly Top 40 friendly like 'Union City Blue' instantly is." A video was produced for the single, directed by David Mallet, which featured the band performing at the Union Dry Dock in nearby Weehawken, New Jersey. Nigel Harrison recalled:

We eventually went down to Union City and we have an aerial view with a helicopter and the whole bit way down there on the dock. It comes from across the river.

The track was re-released on CD and vinyl on October 16, 1995, as a maxi single in both the UK and US, featuring various remixes of the song by Diddy, Burger Queen, OPM and Jammin' Hot. A previously heavily bootlegged live version from 1979 of Donna Summer's hit "I Feel Love" was included as a b-side. Charting a second time after its original 1979 release, the single peaked at number 31 in the UK. The remixed version of "Union City Blue" was also included on the compilations Beautiful: The Remix Album (UK) and Remixed Remade Remodeled: The Remix Project (US).

The song appears in the 1981 horror film The Hand, and the 2007 dark comedy film Margot at the Wedding.

== Reception ==
Critics have acclaimed "Union City Blue". Debra Rae Cohen of Rolling Stone wrote, "'Union City Blue' evokes life-or-death romance. Mixed with the intertwined-guitars-and-keyboards density of 'Dreaming,' 'Union City Blue' has the force of an incantation. Key words — power, passion — slip out with a resonant urgency. Harry's finally using her sweet tones to create real emotional intensity." Sam Armstrong of uDiscoverMusic wrote that the song "conjures the sort of romantic yearning you only ever get from finding yourself adrift in a city where anything can happen." Pop Expresso named the song as the band's fifth best song.

== Track listing ==
UK 7-inch (Chrysalis CHS 2400)

1. "Union City Blue" (Nigel Harrison, Deborah Harry) – 3:18
2. "Living in the Real World" (Jimmy Destri) – 2:53

UK 1995 Remix CD1 (7243 8 82466 2 0)

1. "Union City Blue" (Diddy's Power & Passion Edit) – 3:38
2. "Union City Blue" (Diddy's Power & Passion Mix) – 8:34
3. "Union City Blue" (Vinny Vero's Turquoise Mix) – 8:23
4. "Union City Blue" (Jammin Hot's I Can't Believe It's Not Diddy Mix) – 7:37
5. "Union City Blue" (Burger Queen Peroxide Power Mix) – 7:40

UK 1995 Remix CD2 (7243 8 82467 2 9)

1. "Union City Blue" (Diddy's Power & Passion Edit) – 3:45
2. "I Feel Love" (Live) – 7:53
3. "Union City Blue" (The OPM Poppy Mix) – 8:48
4. "Union City Blue" (Original Version) – 3:18

US 1995 Remix CD (7243 8 58474 2 4)

1. "Union City Blue" (Diddy's Remix Edit) – 3:38 *
2. "Union City Blue" (Original Single Version) – 3:18
3. "Union City Blue" (Vinny Vero's Turquoise Mix) – 8:23
4. "Union City Blue" (Burger Queen Peroxide Power Mix) – 7:40
5. "Union City Blue" (OPM Poppy Mix) – 8:48
6. "Union City Blue" (Diddy's Power & Passion Mix) – 8:34
7. "I Feel Love" (Live) – 7:53
- * Identical to the UK Diddy's Power & Passion Edit mix.

== Charts ==
Chart (1979–1980)	Peak position
Ireland (IRMA)	17
New Zealand (Recorded Music NZ)	47
UK Singles (Official Charts)	13
Finland (Suomen virallinen lista)	30
West Germany (GfK)	54

Chart (1995)	Peak position
UK Singles (Official Charts)	31
US Billboard Hot Dance Music/Maxi-Singles Sales	30

== Certifications ==
Region	Certification	Certified units/sales
United Kingdom (BPI)	Silver	250,000^{^}
^{^} Shipments figures based on certification alone.
