= We Like to Party (disambiguation) =

"We Like to Party" is a song by Vengaboys.

We Like to Party may also refer to:

- "We Like to Party" (Showtek song)
- "We Like to Party" (Party Animals song)
- "We Like 2 Party", a song by Big Bang
- "We Like to Party", a song by Inna from the album Party Never Ends
