= Remixed Remade Remodeled: The Remix Project =

Remix album by Blondie
- Released: July 18, 1995
- Genre: House, techno
- Length: 77:47
- Label: Chrysalis/EMI Records; 7243 8 32748 2 6 F2-32748
- Producer: Vinny Vero

Blondie chronology
Beautiful: The Remix Album (1995)	Remixed Remade Remodeled: The Remix Project (1995)	Denis (1996)

Professional ratings
Review scores
Source	Rating
AllMusic	2/5 stars

Remixed Remade Remodeled: The Remix Project is a remix album of recordings by Blondie released by Chrysalis/EMI Records in the US and the UK in 1995 as part of EMI's Brilliant series. The album spun off four remix singles in the US: "Atomic", "Rapture", "Heart of Glass" and "Union City Blue".

By August 9, 2005, it had sold 89,000 copies in United States.

== Track listing ==
No.	Title	Writer(s)	Remixer(s)	Length
1.	"Heart of Glass" (Richie Jones Club Mix)	Debbie Harry; Chris Stein	Richie Jones	8:42
2.	"Dreaming" (Sub-Urban Dream Mix)	Harry; Stein	Tommy Musto	7:38
3.	"One Way or Another" (Damien's Supermarket Mix)	Harry; Nigel Harrison	Phillip Damien	7:59
4.	"Atomic" (Diddy's 12" Mix)	Harry; Jimmy Destri	Diddy	6:54
5.	"Rapture" (K-Klassic Mix)	Stein; Harry	K-Klass	7:07
6.	"The Tide Is High" (Sand Dollar Mix)	John Holt	Pete Arden; Vinny Vero	7:17
7.	"Heart of Glass" (MK 12" Mix)	Harry; Stein	MK	7:16
8.	"Call Me" (E-Smoove's Beat Vocal Mix)	Giorgio Moroder; Harry	E-Smoove	7:14
9.	"Dreaming" (Utah Saints Mix)	Harry; Stein	Utah Saints	7:05
10.	"Atomic" (Armand's Short Circuit Mix)	Harry; Destri	Armand Van Helden	6:00
11.	"Fade Away and Radiate" (108 BPM Mix)	Stein	The Black Dog	4:46

== Personnel ==
- Original producer - Mike Chapman (1–7, 9–11); Giorgio Moroder (8)
- Mastered by Chris Gehringer
- Producer - Vinny Vero

"Heart of Glass" (Richie Jones Club Mix):

- Engineer - "Ghetto" Dan Hetzel
- Programmer - Eric Kupper, Richie Jones

"Dreaming" (The Sub-Urban Dream Mix):

- Engineer, programmer - Matthias Heilbronn, Tommy Musto
- Keyboards - Mac Quayle

"Atomic" (Diddy's 12" Mix):

- Engineer - Republica

"The Tide Is High" (Sand Dollar Mix):

- Engineer, mixer - Guido Osorio

"Dreaming" (Utah Saints Mix):

- Engineer - Phil Evans
- Remix engineer - Guy Hatton

"Atomic" (Armand's Short Circuit Mix):

- Editor - Jeff Federman
