= American Gigolo (disambiguation) =

American Gigolo is a 1980 feature film, written and directed by Paul Schrader and starring Richard Gere.

American Gigolo may also refer to:

- American Gigolo (soundtrack), soundtrack album to the abovementioned feature film
- American Gigolo (TV series), an American drama television series based on the film
- "American Gigolo," a song by Weezer from their 2002 album Maladroit

== See also ==
- "American Gigg-olo", an episode of the animated television sitcom Family Guy
