= Feel the Spin =

Single by Debbie Harry

from the album Krush Groove
- Released: 1985
- Recorded: 1985
- Genre: Pop
- Label: Warner Bros.; Geffen
- Songwriter(s): John "Jellybean" Benitez; Toni C.; Deborah Harry

Debbie Harry singles chronology
"Rush Rush" (1983)	"Feel the Spin" (1985)	"French Kissin" (1986)

Audio sample
- "Feel the Spin": file; help

"Feel the Spin" is a 1985 song by the American vocalist Debbie Harry, featured on the soundtrack album for the film Krush Groove (1985). The song was co-written by Harry and producers John "Jellybean" Benitez and Toni C. (the latter of whom would go on to collaborate with Harry again on many of her solo albums).

== Release and aftermath ==
"Feel the Spin" was released as an extended 12" single on Warner Bros. Records / Geffen Records in the US (where it charted on the Hot Dance Music/Maxi-Singles Sales chart at #5). It was also released as a single in Canada, but not in the UK (though the track would surface in 1987 as the B-side of the UK singles "Free to Fall" and "In Love with Love").

The extended dance version of "Feel the Spin" was included on both the 1988 Blondie/Debbie Harry remix compilation Once More into the Bleach as well as Harry's 1999 greatest hits compilation Most of All: The Best of Deborah Harry.

On the entry for October 24, 1985 of the Andy Warhol Diaries, he recalls that he:

Cabbed to the Palladium for Debbie Harry's party ($6) for her song that Jellybean produced, "Feel the Spin". When Debbie arrived, she saw us in the balcony and came up there because she thought it was the place to [laughs] be, and then it was the place to be because all the photographers came after her. She looks great. Debbie actually was the first Madonna.

The "uno, dos... uno dos, tres, cuatro" counting was sampled in S'Express' single "Theme from S'Express" (1988).

== Reception ==
John Leland at Spin said, "Take away the psychic leverage afforded a beautiful blonde by a cool sense of irony, and she becomes just another lifeless nonentity. Blondie at its best offered hip mystique and a somehow sexy sexual negation. Jellybean's automatic pilot production does nothing to bail out the weak song or the weak performance."

== Track listing ==
- US 12-inch single
1. "Feel the Spin" (extended dance version) – 6:50
2. "Feel the Spin" (dub version) – 4:34

== Charts ==
=== Weekly charts ===
Weekly chart performance for "Feel the Spin"
Chart (1985)	Peak position
US Dance Singles Sales (Billboard)	5

=== Year-end charts ===
Year-end chart performance for "Feel the Spin"
Chart (1986)	Position
US Dance Singles Sales (Billboard)	46
