= Rapture (Blondie song) =

1981 single by Blondie

- North American picture sleeve

Single by Blondie

from the album Autoamerican
- B-side: "Walk Like Me"
- Released: January 12, 1981
- Recorded: 1980
- Studio: United Western, Hollywood, California
- Genre: Disco; new wave; hip hop; pop; rap rock
- Length: 4:57 (Single Version) • 6:31 (Album Version)
- Label: Chrysalis
- Songwriters: Debbie Harry; Chris Stein
- Producer: Mike Chapman

Blondie singles chronology
"The Tide Is High" (1980)	"Rapture" (1981)	"Island of Lost Souls" (1982)

Alternate cover
- European picture sleeve

Music video
- "Rapture" on YouTube

"Rapture" is a song by American rock band Blondie from their fifth studio album, Autoamerican (1980). Written by band members Debbie Harry and Chris Stein, and produced by Mike Chapman, the song was released as the second and final single from Autoamerican on January 12, 1981, by Chrysalis Records. Musically, "Rapture" is a combination of new wave, disco and hip-hop with a rap section forming an extended coda.

"Rapture" was another commercial success for the band, shipping one million copies in the United States, where it was certified Gold by the Recording Industry Association of America (RIAA) and spent two weeks at number one on the Billboard Hot 100, their fourth and final single to reach the top. It was the first number-one single in the United States to feature rap vocals. The single also peaked at number three in Canada, and number five in Australia and the United Kingdom. It broke four rap song records; the first million-seller; the first to reach number one, the first to appear in the charts using only original music and the first to appear on MTV.

== Background ==
Singer Debbie Harry and guitarist Chris Stein were friends with Brooklyn- and Bronx-based hip-hop artists such as Fab 5 Freddy (Fred Brathwaite) in the late 1970s. Brathwaite took Harry and Stein to a rap event in the Bronx one night in 1978, and they were both impressed by the skill and excitement as MCs rhymed lyrics over the beats of spinning records and people lined up for a chance to take the microphone and freestyle rap. Harry and Stein went to a few more such events before deciding to write a rap song of their own in late 1979. They decided to combine what they had seen and heard in the Bronx with Chic-inspired disco music. Keyboardist Jimmy Destri found some tubular bells in the back of the studio, which added a haunting touch to the song. The title "Rapture" was a pun on "rap", according to Stein.

In an early recording, the music was slower and simpler. Stein said that "[t]he slower tape was just bass, drums and guitar doubling the bass, I don’t think much else." This version was put aside and later reworked as "Rapture". For "Rapture", Stein said that "[w]e decided to make it faster." Stein later retrieved the original recording, and Harry and Brathwaite added vocals. The result was released in the UK as "Yuletide Throwdown" as a flexi disc given away with the magazine Flexipop.

Stein loved B-movies and science fiction imagery, so he wrote some surreal verses about a man from Mars. For the chorus, Harry tried to capture the feeling of a crowded hip-hop dance floor in the Bronx: "Toe to toe / Dancing very close / Barely breathing / Almost comatose / Wall to wall / People hypnotized / And they're stepping lightly / Hang each night in Rapture." The rap section references Fab 5 Freddy ("Fab 5 Freddy told me everybody's fly"), as well as Grandmaster Flash ("Flash is fast, Flash is cool"). Record World said that "Debbie's sweet, enticing vocal transforms itself into a streetwise jam," calling the song "infectious" and calling the rhythm "hypnotic."

== Music video ==
The accompanying music video for "Rapture" made its US television debut on Solid Gold on January 31, 1981 and not only became the first rap video ever broadcast on MTV but was part of its first 90-video rotation. Set in the East Village section of Manhattan, the "Man from Mars" or "voodoo god" (dancer William Barnes in the white suit and top hat) is the introductory and central figure. Barnes also choreographed the piece. Much of the video is a one-take scene of lead singer Debbie Harry dancing down the street, passing by graffiti artists, Uncle Sam, an Indigenous American, child ballet dancer and a goat. Fab 5 Freddy and graffiti artists Lee Quiñones and Jean-Michel Basquiat make cameo appearances. Basquiat was hired when Grandmaster Flash did not show for the shoot. The UK 7" version of the song is used in the video.

== Versions ==
The versions appearing on the US and UK 7" and 12" singles were quite different. The US 7" single, also issued with a different cover picture, used the original album version and the US 12" single used a version with an additional verse, making it 40 seconds longer. For the UK and other market single releases, producer Mike Chapman remixed the track completely. The "Special Disco Mix" has a different introduction, a longer instrumental break with new percussion overdubbed and includes the extra verse, making it 10 minutes long. The UK 7" version (4:59) was an edit of the "Special Disco Mix" without the extra verse. A slightly different edit with the extra verse (5:36) appeared on the band's first greatest hits compilation The Best of Blondie (1981). The album track "Live It Up" was also extended and remixed for the B-side of the non-US 12" single. This 8-minute version was included on the 1994 UK CD edition of Autoamerican and was reissued as part of EMI's 15-disc Blondie Singles Box in 2004. The song is widely regarded as one of Blondie's best; in 2017, Billboard ranked the song number two on their list of the 10 greatest Blondie songs and in 2021, The Guardian ranked the song number seven on their list of the 20 greatest Blondie songs.

Blondie re-recorded the song for their 2014 compilation album Greatest Hits Deluxe Redux. The compilation was part of a 2-disc set called Blondie 4(0) Ever which included their tenth studio album Ghosts of Download and marked the 40th anniversary of the forming of the band. The picture of Debbie Harry used for the UK editions of the original 7" and 12" "Rapture" singles was later used for the cover of the compilation album Beautiful: The Remix Album (1995).

=== Remixes ===
Other than the original remixes from 1981, the first official remix of "Rapture" can be found on the compilation album Once More into the Bleach (1988). The track was remixed again and re-issued as a single in both the UK and the US in 1994, this time peaking at number eight on the US Dance Club Songs chart. This remix was included on the compilations The Platinum Collection (1994), Beautiful: The Remix Album (1995) and Remixed Remade Remodeled: The Remix Project (1995).

Joseph Saddler (Grandmaster Flash) included the song in his 2002 mastermix compilation Essential Mix: Classic Edition but re-edited the song so none of the spoken-word parts (in which he himself is referenced by Blondie) are included, thus taking the rap completely out of "Rapture".

=== Rapture Riders ===
In 2005, "Rapture" was mashed with The Doors' 1971 song "Riders on the Storm" into "Rapture Riders" by Go Home Productions. This unofficial mashup remix was later approved by both bands and released as a single credited to Blondie vs. The Doors. It was also included on Blondie's compilation album Greatest Hits: Sight + Sound (2005). "Rapture Riders" made the top-ten on the US Dance Club Songs and was a Top 40 hit in Australia and Europe.

=== Covers ===
Erasure covered "Rapture" as a bonus track on their 1997 album Cowboy.

To promote the character's appearances in the third season of The Boys, Jensen Ackles appeared in several videos depicting Soldier Boy's in-universe promotional campaigns in the 1980s, in particular, serenading the dancers of Solid Gold with a spoken-word rendition of "Rapture". Ackles's cover received additional praise from the band itself, with Debbie Harry describing the rendition as "epic".

== Credits and personnel ==
- Debbie Harry – vocals
- Clem Burke – drums
- Jimmy Destri – electric keyboards
- Nigel Harrison – bass
- Frank Infante – guitar
- Chris Stein – guitar, timpani
- Tom Scott – saxophone

== Track listing and formats ==
US 7" (CHS 2485, January 1981)

1. "Rapture" (Album version) (Deborah Harry, Chris Stein) – 6:33
2. "Walk Like Me" (Jimmy Destri) – 3:45

US 12" (12 CHS 2485, January 1981)

1. "Rapture" (US 12" Mix) (Harry, Stein) – 7:13
2. "Walk Like Me" (Destri) – 3:45

UK 7" (CHS 2485, January 1981)

1. "Rapture" (UK 7" Mix) (Harry, Stein) – 4:59
2. "Walk Like Me" (Destri) – 3:45

UK 12" (CHS 12 2485, January 1981)

1. "Rapture" (Special Disco Mix) (Harry, Stein) – 10:01
2. "Live It Up" (Stein) (Special Disco Mix) – 8:14

US 1994 Remix CD (7243 8 85277 2 3)

1. "Rapture" (K-klassic Radio Mix) – 4:20
2. "Rapture" (Original Single Version) – 4:57
3. "Rapture" (Guru's Fly Party Mix) – 4:11
4. "Rapture" (K-klassic Mix) – 7:07
5. "Rapture" (Original Disco Mix) – 10:00 *
6. "Rapture" (Pharmacy Dub) – 6:00
7. "Rapture" (Phactory Beats) – 4:22
8. "Call Me" (American Gigolo Version) – 8:04
- * Identical to the original Special Disco Mix.

=== Rapture Riders ===
CD (0946 3475502 3)

1. "Rapture Riders" (Single Edit) – 3:50
2. "Rapture Riders" (Full Version) – 5:41
3. "Rapture" (7" Version) – 4:57
4. "Rapture" (Special Disco Mix) (2001 Remaster) – 9:59

12" (347 550 1)

1. "Rapture Riders" (Full Version) – 5:41
2. "Rapture" (Special Disco Mix) (2001 Remaster) – 9:59

== Charts ==
=== Weekly charts ===
Chart (1981)	Peak position
Australia (Kent Music Report)	5
Belgium (Ultratop 50 Flanders)	8
Canada Top Singles (RPM)	3
Ireland (IRMA)	4
Luxembourg (Radio Luxembourg)	1
Netherlands (Dutch Top 40)	19
Netherlands (Single Top 100)	20
New Zealand (Recorded Music NZ)	4
Norway (VG-lista)	8
South Africa (Springbok Radio)	6
Spain (AFYVE)	21
Sweden (Sverigetopplistan)	13
UK Singles (Official Charts)	5
US Billboard Hot 100	1
US Dance Club Songs (Billboard) with "The Tide Is High"	1
US Hot R&B/Hip-Hop Songs (Billboard)	33
US Mainstream Rock Airplay (Billboard)	35
US Cash Box Top 100	1
West Germany (GfK)	40

1994 remix
Chart (1994)	Peak position
US Dance Club Songs (Billboard)	8
US Dance Singles Sales (Billboard)	35

"Rapture Riders"
Chart (2006)	Peak position
Australia (ARIA)	23
Belgium (Ultratop 50 Flanders)	21
Belgium (Ultratip Bubbling Under Wallonia)	2
Finland (Suomen virallinen lista)	12
Netherlands (Tipparade)	10
Netherlands (Single Top 100)	39
US Dance Club Songs (Billboard)	10

=== Year-end charts ===
Chart (1981)	Position
Australia (Kent Music Report)	55
Belgium (Ultratop 50 Flanders)	100
Canada Top Singles (RPM)	24
US Billboard Hot 100	15
US Dance Club Songs (Billboard) with "The Tide Is High"	7
US Cash Box Top 100	15

== Certifications ==
Region	Certification	Certified units/sales
United Kingdom (BPI)	Silver	250,000^{^}
United States (RIAA)	Gold	1,000,000^{^}
^{^} Shipments figures based on certification alone.

== See also ==
- List of Billboard Hot 100 number-one singles of the 1980s
