= Scarface (Push It to the Limit) =

1983 single by Paul Engemann

Single by Paul Engemann

from the album Scarface: Music from the Original Motion Picture Soundtrack
- B-side: "Tony's Theme"
- Released: February 3, 1984
- Recorded: 1983
- Length: 3:00
- Label: MCA
- Songwriters: Giorgio Moroder; Pete Bellotte
- Producer: Giorgio Moroder

Paul Engemann singles chronology
"For Your Love" (1975)	"Scarface (Push It to the Limit)" (1984)	"American Dream" (1984)

"Scarface (Push It to the Limit)" is a song performed by American singer Paul Engemann. It was written by Giorgio Moroder and Pete Bellotte for the 1983 motion picture Scarface. The song is included on the film's soundtrack and is used in a montage sequence illustrating the rise in wealth and power of Tony Montana, portrayed by Al Pacino, after he kills Frank Lopez (Robert Loggia) and assumes control of Miami's cocaine trade. In the film, the song appeared in a slightly longer version, later released on a 12-inch single. "Scarface (Push It to the Limit)" has been sampled by multiple musicians and used in montage sequences in multiple television episodes.

== Context ==
"Scarface (Push It to the Limit)" is sung by Paul Engemann. It was written by Giorgio Moroder and Pete Bellotte, with Moroder also serving as producer, specifically for the 1983 film Scarface.

The movie follows the rise and fall of Tony Montana (portrayed by Al Pacino) as he becomes a drug lord in Miami. The song is featured during a montage sequence following the killing of his boss Frank Lopez (Robert Loggia), during which Montana takes control of the cocaine trafficking organization and marries Lopez's widow, Elvira Hancock (Michelle Pfeiffer). During the sequence, the montage depicts currency-counting machines and money being transported to a bank, while Tony's cover business is shown as being related to travel. Film critic Glenn Kenny described the scene as resembling "an advertisement for itself", which he argued resulted in an artificial sense.

== Reception and popular culture ==
Kenny interpreted the lyrics "You've reached the top, but you still gotta learn how to keep it" as a cautionary message about the fragility of success, delivered "over a propulsive, anthemic disco beat". Ken Tucker described Engemann's vocals as a "full-throated, arena-rock warble", comparing them to those of Steve Perry, the vocalist of Journey. He also compared the song to "Eye of the Tiger", sung by Survivor, in terms of their respective relevance to the films in which they appeared ("Eye of the Tiger" appearing in Rocky III). Tucker concluded that Engemann's tenor conveys both the film's overt machismo and the underlying sense of desperation. Ryan Pearson described the song for Effingham Daily News as "synth-heavy".

"Scarface (Push It to the Limit)" has appeared in popular culture through song samplings and television montage sequences, including as a background portraying dark horse characters.

=== Music ===
"Scarface (Push It to the Limit)" was also added to the playlist of the soundtrack of the 2001 video game Grand Theft Auto III. It can be heard on its fictional "Flashback 95.6" radio station, which is composed entirely of songs from the film. The song has been covered by multiple musicians, including Battle Beast on Unholy Savior, and PelleK, and has been sampled in "Push It", by Rick Ross, as well as in works by Mobb Deep, Fonky Family, and GOOD Music, among others.

=== Television ===
"Scarface (Push It to the Limit)" was used in the South Park episode "Up the Down Steroid", which also parodied the montage scene in Scarface, features Eric Cartman failing at every event in which he participates during the Special Olympics. It was used in "Mac's Big Break", the fourth episode of the sixth season of It's Always Sunny in Philadelphia. The song was also used in the Stranger Things episode "Chapter Four: Will the Wise" during a basketball game. In the episode "Teenage Mutant Milk-Caused Hurdles" of The Simpsons, the song is used in the opening couch gag, depicting Homer Simpson paying homage to Miami Vice and Knight Rider.

== Track listing ==
- 7-inch single
1. "Scarface (Push It to the Limit)" – 3:00
2. "Tony's Theme" – 3:12
- 12-inch single
1. "Scarface (Push It to the Limit) – Extended Version" – 5:12

== See also ==
- "You're the Best", song featured in The Karate Kid
- "Gonna Fly Now", also known as "Theme from Rocky"
