= Union City (film) =

- Theatrical release poster
- Directed by: Mark Reichert
- Written by: Mark Reichert
- Based on: "Union City: The Corpse Next Door" by Cornell Woolrich
- Produced by: Monty Montgomery; Graham Belin
- Starring: Deborah Harry; Dennis Lipscomb; Everett McGill
- Cinematography: Edward Lachman
- Edited by: Lana Jokel; J. Michaels
- Music by: Chris Stein
- Production company: Kinesis Ltd.
- Distributed by: Daltyn Film Works, Inc.
- Release dates: May 17, 1980 (Cannes); September 26, 1980 (New York City)
- Running time: 87 minutes
- Country: United States
- Language: English
- Budget: $500,000

Union City is a 1980 American neo-noir crime mystery film directed by Mark Reichert and starring Deborah Harry, Dennis Lipscomb, and Everett McGill. Based on the short story "Union City: The Corpse Next Door" by Cornell Woolrich, the film had its world premiere at the Cannes Film Festival on May 17, 1980, before opening in New York City on September 26, 1980, and in Los Angeles on August 5, 1981.

== Plot ==
In 1953, Harlan is a repressed, uptight accountant living in an apartment block with his beautiful, neglected wife Lillian. He becomes obsessed with discovering who is drinking from the milk bottles left outside his apartment every morning, so he ties some cord to a bottle which will alert him when it is taken, and through this he finds the culprit to be a homeless war veteran. The vagrant apologises but the obsessive Harlan attacks him, knocking him down and seemingly cracking his skull. In a panic he hides the body behind the folding bed in another vacant apartment opposite his own.

Harlan's behaviour becomes ever more irrational, driving Lillian away from him and into the arms of building supervisor Larry Longacre (McGill); he believes another deranged resident known as the Contessa is planning to run away with him, and puts potential residents off the room where he hid the vagrant's body with his bizarre behaviour.

However, eventually a young couple of newly-weds, Alphonse and Jeanette Flourescu move in. Harlan attempts to dissuade Alphonse from opening the bed but is unsuccessful. Alphonse looks at the bloody but empty bed as a terrified Harlan throws himself through the apartment window to his death on the street below. A crowd gathers around his body, watched briefly by the disinterested vagrant, alive with his head bandaged.

== Cast ==
- Deborah Harry as Lillian
- Dennis Lipscomb as Harlan
- Everett McGill as Larry Longacre
- Irina Maleeva as The Contessa
- Pat Benatar as Jeanette Florescu
- Tony Azito as Alphonse Florescu
- Sam McMurray as Young Vagrant
- Cynthia Crisp as Wanda
- Taylor Mead as Walter
- Paul Andor as Ludendorff
- Arthur McFarland as Mr. Lewis
- C. C. H. Pounder as Mrs. Lewis

== Production ==
The film starred Everett McGill, Dennis Lipscomb, and Deborah Harry of Blondie fame. The band was relatively unknown in the US at the time Harry was cast, but this changed when "Heart of Glass" reached number one in the United States midway through filming. As director Marcus Reichert later recalled, she was forbidden to sing on the film's soundtrack for contractual reasons, but her experiences led to the recording of the Blondie song "Union City Blue". Reichert also cast singer Pat Benatar, soon to make a mainstream breakthrough on the pop charts, in a featured role. Harry's partner, fellow Blondie member Chris Stein, performed the film's original score.

The short story written by Cornell Woolrich is set in the 1930s but Reichert relocated it to 1953, for he felt the period offered greater psychological possibilities for his interpretation of the material. With the encouragement of the film's originating producer Monty Montgomery, he wrote the screenplay in eight days. Union City was filmed on location on 27th Street off Summit Avenue in Union City, and on 48th Street and Hudson Avenue, in March 1979. Although it was hailed as "an unqualified masterpiece" by critic Lawrence O'Toole when it appeared in The Directors' Fortnight at Cannes in 1980, and United Artists offered to distribute Reichert's finished film, the film was recut by co-producers Kinesis Ltd., who decided to be the American distributor, in order to get a PG rating. The excised material is believed by Reichert to have been destroyed when the Movielab building, in which the film was stored, was sold to Arriflex. Union City has been released on DVD by Tartan Video and Sony Pictures Home Entertainment. The film is now under contract to MGM/UA Pictures.

== Critical reception ==
Union City received negative to mixed reviews. The film holds a 50% rating on Rotten Tomatoes based on six reviews.
