= Strike Me Pink =

Single by Deborah Harry

from the album Debravation
- Released: 1993
- Recorded: 1993
- Genre: Pop
- Length: 4:02
- Label: Chrysalis Records (UK)
- Songwriter(s): Deborah Harry; Anne Dudley; Jonathan Bernstein
- Producer(s): Anne Dudley

Deborah Harry singles chronology
"I Can See Clearly" (1993)	"Strike Me Pink" (1993)	"I Want That Man (Remix)" (1999)

Audio sample
- Strike Me Pink: file; help

"Strike Me Pink" is a song by American singer-songwriter Debbie Harry, released in 1993 as the second single from her fourth solo album, Debravation (1993). The song was written by Harry, Anne Dudley and Jonathan Bernstein, and produced by Dudley.

== Song information ==
"Strike Me Pink" peaked at #46 on the UK Singles Chart in September 1993, and #136 on the Australian ARIA singles chart.

The accompanying promo video for the single was controversial because it depicted Harry watching a man drown in a tank. The video was banned from several music television channels.

The single also marked Harry's final release with Chrysalis Records and the end of her long tenure with the company (she had originally signed with Chrysalis in the mid 1970s as part of Blondie). This would also be Harry's last solo single for fourteen years until she released "Two Times Blue" in 2007.

== Critical reception ==
In a review of Debravation, The Advocate selected "Strike Me Pink" as "the best cut by far", adding that it evokes Cyndi Lauper's "Time After Time". Entertainment Weekly picked the song as one of the album's "gems", while the Chicago Tribune highlighted it as an example of one of the album's "light and airy" tracks.

In a review of the song's UK single release, Alan Jones from Music Week gave it three out of five, writing, "Strangely redolent of Liza Minnelli's "So Sorry, I Said", "Strike Me Pink" is all muted horns, swirly synths and dreamy vocals. Melodic, with a pleasing lilt of a chorus repeated at regular intervals. How can it miss?" John Harris of NME criticized it as "an insipid dance-ballad that sounds like one of the songs they used to play in Miami Vice when Don Johnson got laid".

In the 1997 book The Trouser Press Guide to '90s Rock, author Ira A. Robbins described the song as "mushy elegance". In their 2012 book Blondie: Parallel Lives, authors Dick Porter and Kris Needs described the song as an "emotive keyboard and sax-infused ballad". JT Griffith of AllMusic criticized the song for being "bland" and "not a strong track from [Harry's] weak solo effort". Kris Needs of Record Collector felt it was "haunting", with Dudley "lending her cinematic sheen" to the song.

== Track listing ==
- UK CD #1
1. "Strike Me Pink" (Bernstein, Dudley, Harry) - 4:02
2. "On A Breath" (Leigh Foxx) - 4:31
  - Non-album track. Produced by Chris Stein.
3. "Sweet and Low" (Phil Harding 7" Mix) (Deborah Harry, Toni. C) - 3:46
  - Original version appears on 1989 album Def, Dumb and Blonde.
- UK CD #2
1. "Strike Me Pink" (Bernstein, Dudley, Harry) - 4:02
2. "8 1/2 Rhumba" (Nino Rota) - 2:46
  - Non-album track. Arranged and produced by Chris Stein.
3. "Dreaming" (Deborah Harry, Chris Stein) - 3:22
  - Blondie: original 1979 version from Eat to the Beat.
- UK Cassette
1. "Strike Me Pink" (Bernstein, Dudley, Harry) - 4:02
2. "8 1/2 Rhumba" (Nino Rota) - 2:46
- UK 12" Picture Disc
1. "Strike Me Pink" (Bernstein, Dudley, Harry) - 4:02
2. "8 1/2 Rhumba" (Nino Rota) - 2:46
3. "Dreaming" (Deborah Harry, Chris Stein) - 3:22
4. "Sweet and Low" (Phil Harding 7" Mix) (Deborah Harry, Toni. C) - 3:46

== Charts ==
Chart performance for "Strike Me Pink"
Chart (1993)	Peak position
Australia (ARIA)	136
UK Singles (OCC)	46
UK Airplay (ERA)	94
