= The Jam Was Moving =

Single by Debbie Harry

from the album KooKoo
- B-side: "Chrome"; "Inner City Spillover"
- Released: 1981
- Recorded: 1981
- Genre: Rock
- Length: 2:58 (7" mix); 5:03 (12" mix)
- Label: Chrysalis
- Songwriter(s): Nile Rodgers; Bernard Edwards
- Producer(s): Nile Rodgers; Bernard Edwards

Debbie Harry singles chronology
"Backfired" (1981)	"The Jam Was Moving" (1981)	"Chrome" (1981)

Audio sample
- file; help

"The Jam Was Moving" is a 1981 song by the American singer Debbie Harry. It was the second single to be released from her debut solo album, KooKoo. Released with no video and little promotion, after Harry's debut solo single, "Backfired", failed to become a big hit, "The Jam Was Moving" fared even less well, peaking at #82 on the US Billboard Hot 100 and failing to chart at all in the UK.

== Background ==
The single peaked at #82 on the Billboard Pop Singles chart in the US, but made no appearance on any other major chart.

The 7" Mix of "The Jam Was Moving" (featuring additional guitars during the intro) appears on the Chrysalis Records/EMI compilation Most of All: The Best of Deborah Harry. The original 1981 12" mix of "The Jam Was Moving" was also included as a bonus track on Chrysalis Records/EMI UK's 1994 CD re-issue of the KooKoo album, the extended version of the album track "Inner City Spillover" was released by Gold Legion Records in 2011 (the 30th anniversary of the album's release).

In 1988, Debbie Harry and Chris Stein remixed "The Jam Was Moving" for inclusion on the Blondie/Debbie Harry remix compilation Once More into the Bleach.

== Track listing ==
=== 7" vinyl ===
Side one
No.	Title	Writer(s)	Length
1.	"The Jam Was Moving (7" Mix)"	Nile Rodgers, Bernard Edwards	2:58

Side two
No.	Title	Writer(s)	Length
1.	"Chrome"	Debbie Harry, Chris Stein	4:13

=== 12" vinyl ===
Side one
No.	Title	Writer(s)	Length
1.	"The Jam Was Moving" (12" Mix)"	Rodgers, Edwards	5:03

Side two
No.	Title	Writer(s)	Length
1.	"Inner City Spillover (12" Mix)"	Harry, Stein	6:00
2.	"Chrome"	Harry, Stein	4:16

== Charts ==
Chart performance for "The Jam Was Moving"
Chart (1981)	Peak position
US Billboard Hot 100	82
