= Backfired =

Single by Debbie Harry

from the album KooKoo
- Released: July 1981
- Recorded: 1981
- Genre: New wave; dance-rock
- Label: Chrysalis
- Songwriters: Nile Rodgers; Bernard Edwards
- Producers: Nile Rodgers; Bernard Edwards

Debbie Harry singles chronology
"Backfired" (1981)	"The Jam Was Moving" (1981)

"Backfired" is the debut solo single from American singer and Blondie vocalist Debbie Harry. Released in 1981, it was taken from her debut solo studio album, KooKoo.

== Background ==
"Backfired" peaked at number 32 in the UK, and number 43 on the US Billboard Hot 100 (it remains Harry's highest-charting solo single in the US). It also peaked at number 71 on the US Hot Soul Singles chart, and number 29 on the Dance chart. The single also managed to become a hit in only a few other countries including Sweden and Australia.

In an attempt to distinguish herself as a solo artist, Harry's image upon the single's release was quite different from her established image with Blondie. She dyed her hair darker and had a new sci-fi-inspired look, as seen in the music video for the song directed by H.R. Giger, who appeared in the video wearing a mask and mimes the male back-up vocals on the song.

Written and produced by Nile Rodgers and Bernard Edwards of the Chic who had just written and produced a huge hit album for Diana Ross, "Backfired" further developed Harry's experimentation with dance music as seen in some of Blondie's material (the Chic-inspired "Rapture" having been a No. 1 hit for them earlier the same year), this time delving more into funk music.

The 7" edit of "Backfired" appears on the Chrysalis Records/EMI compilation Most of All: The Best of Deborah Harry. A remix of the track by Bruce Forrest and Frank Heller was included on the 1988 Blondie/Debbie Harry remix compilation Once More into the Bleach. The original extended 12" mix from 1981 appears as a bonus track on both the 1994 and 2005 CD re-issues of the album KooKoo.

== Critical reception ==
In his "singles review" prior to the album's release, David Hepworth of Smash Hits was disappointed by the song by saying that "if this is the best that KooKoo has to offer then Debbie Harry's solo career is going to be short".

== Track listing ==
- 7-inch single
1. "Backfired" (7″ edit) (Nile Rodgers, Bernard Edwards) – 3:34
2. "Military Rap" (Deborah Harry, Chris Stein) – 3:47
- 12-inch single
1. "Backfired" (12″ mix) (Rodgers, Edwards) – 6:23
2. "Military Rap" (Harry, Stein) – 3:47

== Charts ==
Chart performance for "Backfired"
Chart (1981)	Peak position
Australia (Kent Music Report)	23
Luxembourg (Radio Luxembourg)	10
New Zealand (Recorded Music NZ)	28
Sweden (Sverigetopplistan)	16
UK Singles (Official Charts)	32
US Billboard Hot 100	43
US Dance Club Songs (Billboard)	29
US Hot R&B/Hip-Hop Songs (Billboard)	71
US Cash Box Top 100 Singles	39
