= Free to Fall =

Single by Debbie Harry

from the album Rockbird
- Released: February 16, 1987
- Recorded: 1985–1986
- Genre: Pop
- Length: 5:31
- Label: Geffen
- Songwriter(s): Deborah Harry; Seth Justman
- Producer(s): Seth Justman

Debbie Harry singles chronology
"French Kissin" (1986)	"Free to Fall" (1987)	"In Love with Love" (1987)

Audio sample
- Free To Fall: file; help

"Free to Fall" is a song by American singer Debbie Harry from her second solo studio album, Rockbird (1986). It was released as the second single in the United States and the United Kingdom. Suffering from lack of record company promotion, the single failed to chart on the Billboard Hot 100 or any other significant U.S. chart, and peaked at number 46 on the UK Singles Chart. The B-side to the single, "Feel the Spin", was a previous U.S. dance hit from the soundtrack to the film Krush Groove.

The line "...sinking in the sea of love" was used previously in a Blondie song, "Man Overboard", from the album Blondie (1976).

== Track listings ==
- 7-inch single
1. "Free to Fall" (7″ Edit) (Deborah Harry, Seth Justman) - 4:13
2. "Feel the Spin" (Album version) (Deborah Harry, John "Jellybean" Benitez, Toni C.) - 4:02
- 12-inch single
1. "Free to Fall" (Album version) (Deborah Harry, Seth Justman) - 5:31
2. "Feel the Spin" (Extended dance version) (Deborah Harry, John "Jellybean" Benitez, Toni C.) - 6:50
3. "Secret Life" (Deborah Harry/Chris Stein) - 3:46

== Charts ==
Chart performance for "Free to Fall"
Chart (1987)	Peak position
UK Singles (OCC)	46
