= In Love with Love =

"In Love With Love"

Single by Debbie Harry

from the album Rockbird
- Released: 27 April 1987
- Recorded: 1986
- Genre: Freestyle; hi-NRG
- Label: Geffen Records (U.S.); Chrysalis Records (UK)
- Songwriters: Deborah Harry, Chris Stein
- Producer: Seth Justman

Debbie Harry singles chronology
| "Free to Fall" (1987) | "In Love With Love" (1987) | "Liar Liar" (1988) |

Audio sample
- "In Love With Love": file; help

Alternative cover
- UK single sleeve.

"In Love with Love" is a 1987 song recorded by the American singer Debbie Harry. It was taken from her second solo album Rockbird and released as the third single in 1987.

== Song information ==
Lyrically, the song is the sequel to Blondie's "Heart of Glass", according to Harry. The single version (dubbed the "London Remix") differs significantly from the LP cut, and was remixed by the Stock Aitken Waterman production team, who at the time were producing many popular singles in both the UK and the US by artists such as Bananarama, Dead or Alive, Rick Astley, (and later Kylie Minogue and Jason Donovan). According to producer Mike Stock, the track was completely re-recorded from the album version, including a new vocal recorded in London. However, all versions of the single credit Seth Justman (who produced the album version) as producer; Stock Aitken Waterman are credited with 'additional production'.

The song was released on May 9, 1987 and was, to date, Harry's only solo single to reach #1 on the US dance chart. The single also went on to become a minor hit in several countries, including #45 in the UK and #70 on the US Billboard Hot 100, where it remains her last entry to date.

A music video was produced for the single, featuring Harry dancing in front of various cultural backdrops in a couple of different outfits throughout the clip.

In 1988, both the US "Heart Of Fire Mix" of "In Love With Love" and the French-language version of "French Kissin' In The USA" were included on the Blondie/Debbie Harry remix compilation Once More into the Bleach. The Stock Aitken Waterman version of "In Love With Love" appears in its edited 7" form on Chrysalis Records/EMI's 1999 compilation Most of All - The Best of Deborah Harry.

== Track listing ==
All tracks (Deborah Harry, Chris Stein) unless otherwise noted.

US 7" #1

1. "In Love with Love" (7" Edit) - 3:20
2. "In Love with Love" (London Mix Edit) - 3:20

US 7" #2

1. "In Love with Love" (London Mix Edit) - 3:20
2. "Secret Life" - 3:45

US 12" #1

1. "In Love with Love" (Heart Of Fire Mix) - 7:12
2. "In Love with Love" (The Passionate Dub) - 7:46
3. "In Love with Love" (Debapella Version) - 4:08

US 12" #2

1. "In Love with Love" (London Extended Mix) - 7:16
2. "In Love with Love" (London Mix Edit) - 3:20
3. "In Love with Love" (Heart Of Fire Mix) - 7:12
4. "Secret Life" - 3:45

UK 7"

1. "In Love with Love" - 3:20 (a.k.a. "London Mix Edit")
2. "French Kissin' In The USA" (French Version - 7" Edit) (Chuck Lorre) - 4:08

UK 12"

1. "In Love with Love" (Extended Version) - 7:20 (a.k.a. "London Extended Mix")
2. "Feel the Spin" (Extended Dance Version) (Deborah Harry, John "Jellybean" Benitez, Toni C.) - 6:50
3. "French Kissin' in the USA" (French Version) (Chuck Lorre) - 5:31

== Charts ==
=== Weekly charts ===
Weekly chart performance for "In Love with Love"
| Chart (1987) | Peak position |
|---|---|
| Finland (Suomen virallinen lista) | 18 |
| Netherlands (Single Top 100) | 95 |
| UK Singles (OCC) | 45 |
| US Billboard Hot 100 | 70 |
| US Dance Club Songs (Billboard) | 1 |
| US Dance Singles Sales (Billboard) | 9 |
| US Cash Box Top 100 Singles | 74 |

=== Year-end charts ===
Year-end chart performance for "In Love with Love"
| Chart (1987) | Position |
|---|---|
| US Dance Club Songs (Billboard) | 15 |

== See also ==
- List of number-one dance hits (United States)
