= We Like to Party (Party Animals song) =

Single by Party Animals

from the album Party@worldaccess.nl
- Released: 1 March 1997
- Genre: Happy Hardcore, Gabber
- Length: 3:09
- Label: Mokum Records
- Songwriters: Evert Van Buschbach, Jeff "Abraxas" Porter and Jeroen Flamman
- Producer: Flamman & Abraxas

Party Animals singles chronology
| "Aquarius" (1996) | "We Like to Party" (1997) | "Atomic" (1997) |

"We Like to Party" is the fourth single of the Party Animals and the first release from their second album Party@worldaccess.nl. The song was released in 1997 and was their first single which was not cover of an existing song. The song peaked at number 6 in the Dutch Top 40 and a number 67 position in the end of the year list of 1997.

== Track listing ==
| # | Title | Length |
|---|---|---|
| 1. | "We Like To Party (Flamman & Abraxas radio mix)" | 3:08 |
| 2. | "Used & Abused (Dominion '97 remix)" | 3:57 |
| 3. | "We Like It Dark" | 4:48 |
| 4. | "C'Mon Everybody (DJ Jordens 2nd Coming)" | 4:39 |
| 5. | "Roodkapje" | 4:35 |

== Chart ==
=== Weekly charts ===
| Chart (1997) | Peak position |
|---|---|
| Netherlands (Dutch Top 40) | 6 |
| Netherlands (Single Top 100) | 8 |

=== Year-end charts ===
| Chart (1997) | Position |
|---|---|
| Netherlands (Dutch Top 40) | 67 |
| Netherlands (Single Top 100) | 92 |
