= Scarface (soundtrack) =

Scarface: Music from the Original Motion Picture Soundtrack

Soundtrack album by various artists
- Released: December 9, 1983
- Recorded: 1983
- Genres: Synth-pop; pop-rock; dance-pop; disco
- Length: 35:15
- Languages: English; Spanish
- Label: MCA
- Producer: Giorgio Moroder

Singles from Scarface: Music from the Original Motion Picture Soundtrack
- 1. "She's on Fire" Released: September 28, 1983; 2. "Rush Rush" Released: November 1983; 3. "Turn Out the Night" Released: 1983; 4. "Scarface (Push It to the Limit)" Released: February 3, 1984

Scarface: Music from the Original Motion Picture Soundtrack is the soundtrack album featured on the 1983 American epic crime drama film, Scarface, which was directed by Brian De Palma. Composed by Italian producer Giorgio Moroder, the vinyl soundtrack was released on December 9 of the same year through MCA Records. The album features music created by Moroder, who wrote and produced all of the tracks. Scarface counts with the collaboration of multiple singers, including Paul Engemann, Debbie Harry, Amy Holland, Elizabeth Daily, among other artists. The soundtrack received a Golden Globe Award nomination for Best Original Score at the 41st Golden Globe Awards.

In 2003, Scarface was remastered and re-released through Universal Records. The 2003 remaster has been criticized for extensively remixing several tracks from the original album. According to De Palma, Universal wanted to change the original soundtrack for a rap score. After its re-release, the album debuted in the French Album Chart at No. 98. In 2006, the soundtrack was featured in the action-adventure video game Scarface: The World Is Yours, which is based on the film. Diverse songs from hip-hop artists sampled songs from the soundtrack. Five songs from the album were also featured on the soundtrack of the video game Grand Theft Auto III (2001), on its fictional Flashback 95.6 radio station.

In June 2022, a 2-CD release was issued by La-La Land Records with the first release of Moroder's original film score on CD 1, and with the 1983 soundtrack album in its original mix plus bonus tracks on CD 2.

== Background and composition ==
Debbie Harry – "Rush Rush"
A sample of the song "Rush Rush", performed by Debbie Harry. Robbie Daw for Idolator noted the lyrics of the song "fit the overall druggy feel" of the film.

Scarface is an American film which relates the story of Tony Montana, a Cuban refugee who goes to Miami in 1980 with the Mariel boatlift, and there he becomes a drug cartel kingpin. Scarface was created as the original soundtrack. Its songs were written and produced by Giorgio Moroder, along with other musicians.

Former frontwoman of the band Blondie, Debbie Harry, co-wrote "Rush Rush". The song's title is a reference to cocaine, and it was based upon Moroder's soundtrack American Gigolo (1980). Robbin Daw considered its lyrics "fit the overall druggy feel" of the film, and Harry commented about it is "[a]s far as the films' themes and the lyrics [she] wrote, they were pretty much up to [her]". The song also became Harry's debut single as solo artist after Blondie's breakup. Moroder worked with Pete Bellotte, with whom he co-wrote "Scarface (Push It to the Limit)", "She's on Fire" and "Turn Out the Night". The first song features vocals of Paul Engemann, while in the other two Amy Holland sang. Arthur Barrow co-wrote "Shake It Up" and "I'm Hot Tonight", in which Elizabeth Daily performed, and "Dance Dance Dance", with Beth Anderson vocals. María Conchita Alonso appeared in the song "Vamos a Bailar". The soundtrack includes two instrumentals, "Tony's Theme" and "Gina's and Elvira's Theme". Main theme, "Tony's Theme", is inspired by, or more precisely a transcription of "The Cold Song", act three of the opera King Arthur by Henry Purcell.

The soundtrack incorporates elements of disco, post-disco and synthrock. According to John Richardson, Claudia Gorbman and Carol Vernallis, in their book The Oxford Handbook of New Audiovisual Aesthetics (2013), Moroder employed music as "material to conduct performances, experiences, and energies whose symbolic function and textural weight are elucidated by the aural materiality of its soundtrack", as in the 1965 American film Vinyl. The main synthesizers used by Moroder for the Scarface soundtrack were the Roland Jupiter-8 and the Yamaha CS-80.

== Releases and reception ==
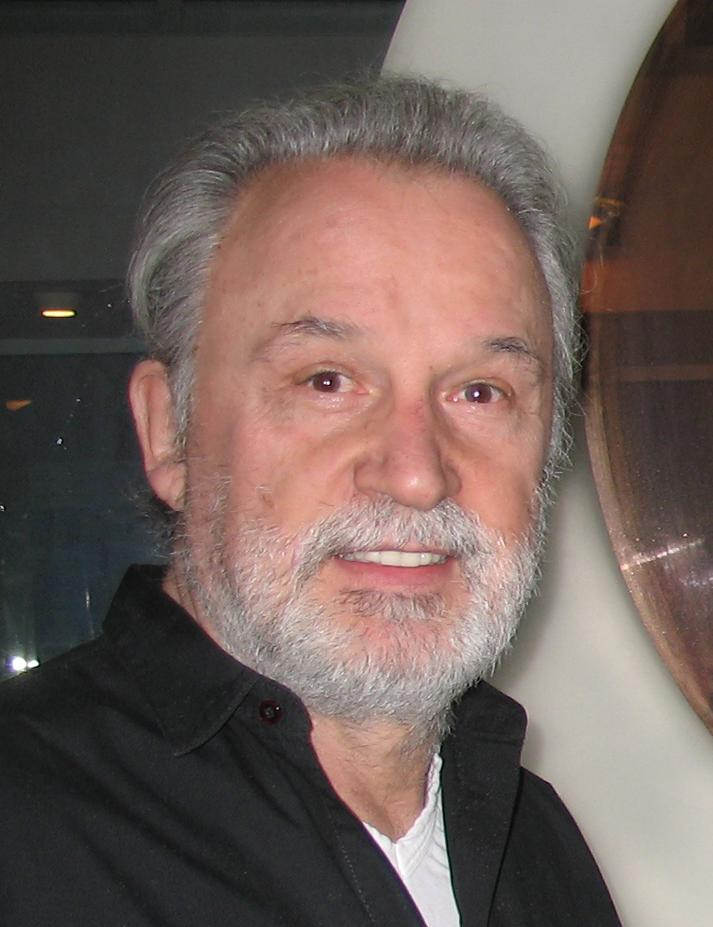
Moroder received a Golden Globe Award nomination for his production work in the soundtrack.

MCA Records released Scarface on December 9, 1983, through vinyl records. After the release of the film, it began to gain notoriety as the time passed. Due to this, in 2003 Universal Pictures re-released the film in DVD, and the soundtrack was remastered and released on CD. According to Brian De Palma, the film director of Scarface, Universal Pictures had intended to re-release the film with a rap score, but De Palma has not allowed them to change the original score, as he considered it to be "perfect". Thanks to the re-release, on March 7, 2004, Scarface debuted at number 98 in the French Album Chart. The soundtrack stayed in the chart for seven weeks.

In its review for the website AllMusic, Jason Birchmeier compared Scarface to other soundtrack works of Moroder, including Flashdance and Electric Dreams, both released in 1983. Birchmeier considered the collaborations of Debbie Harry, Amy Holland and Elizabeth Daily to the soundtrack "much sheer fun", and Moroder's "moody" instrumentals as "quite moving". He considered the film to be "undoubtedly the one that withstood the test of time most impressively, growing in popularity as the years passed", something that did not happen with the soundtrack, and concluded with "Moroder's craft, as always, is notably distinct for its stylishness, if not for its tastefulness". Birchmeier gave Scarface a rating of three-out-of-five stars. Ken Tucker, in his book Scarface Nation – The Ultimate Gangster Movie and How It Changed America (2008), commented that thanks to Moroder's "trashy-glam imagination [...] there's a lot of enjoyment to be gleaned" from his Scarface album. In his review for the album Music Inspired by Scarface, a Def Jam Recordings hip hop compilation album inspired by the music featured in the film, Andy Kellman considered the compilation "threatens to complement the film better than" Scarface, and considered Def Jam's attempt to make a substitution with the original soundtrack "would've been a mistake". Moroder received a Golden Globe Award nomination for Best Original Score at the 1984 ceremony, but lost to his soundtrack work for the film Flashdance.

== Impact ==
Scarface became a "celebrated" album in hip hop culture. "Tony's Theme" was used in the GOOD Music song "Mercy" and Mobb Deep's "G.O.D. Pt. III" and "It's Mine". "On Fire" by Lil Wayne contains allusions from "She's on Fire", while "Push It" by Rick Ross samples "Scarface (Push It to the Limit)". "Rush Rush", "She's on Fire", and "Scarface (Push It to the Limit)", among other songs, were included featured on the soundtrack of the 2001 video game Grand Theft Auto III. They can be heard on its fictional "Flashback 95.6" radio station.

== Track listing ==
Track listing adapted from AllMusic.

All music is composed by Giorgio Moroder.

Side one
No.	Title	Lyrics	Performer	Length
1.	"Scarface (Push It to the Limit)"	Pete Bellotte	Paul Engemann	3:01
2.	"Rush Rush"	Debbie Harry	Debbie Harry	3:37
3.	"Turn Out the Night" (misprinted as "Turn Out the Light" on the LP release)	Bellotte	Amy Holland	3:30
4.	"Vamos a Bailar"	María Conchita	María Conchita	3:41
5.	"Tony's Theme"	instrumental	Giorgio Moroder	3:10

Side two
No.	Title	Lyrics	Performer	Length
1.	"She's on Fire"	Bellotte	Amy Holland	3:43
2.	"Shake It Up"	Arthur Barrow	Elizabeth Daily	3:44
3.	"Dance Dance Dance"	Barrow	Beth Andersen	2:34
4.	"I'm Hot Tonight"	Barrow	Elizabeth Daily	3:13
5.	"Gina's and Elvira's Theme"	instrumental	Helen St. John	5:01
Total length:				35:15

== Credits and personnel ==
Credits adapted from AllMusic:

- Beth Anderson – backing vocalist, lead vocalist
- Tom Arnholt – graphic design
- Arthur Barrow – arranger, lead vocalist, writer
- Pete Bellotte – lead vocalist, writer
- Kathy Nelson – Executive in Charge of Music
- Dave Concors – audio engineer
- Paul Engemann – lead vocalist
- Gary Falcone – backing vocalist
- Debbie Harry – lead vocalist, writer
- Hodges – audio engineer
- Amy Holland – lead vocalist
- Sylvester Levay – arranger
- Giorgio Moroder – arranger, backing vocalist, lead vocalist, record producer, remastering, writer
- Ryan Null – photo coordination
- George Osaki – art direction
- Joe Pizzulo – backing vocalist
- David Rideau – audio engineer
- Amy Ross – music coordinator
- Thomas Schobel – musician
- Steve Shepherd – audio engineer
- Dan Walker – musician
- James Waters, Jr. – backing vocalist
- Marie Waters – backing vocalist
- Tim Whitlock – audio engineer
- Richie Zito – arranger and all guitars

== Chart performance ==
Chart (2004)	Peak position
French Albums Chart	98

== Bibliography ==
- Kushne, David (2012), Jacked: The Outlaw Story of Grand Theft Auto (I ed.), New Jersey, United States: John Wiley & Sons, ISBN 978-0-470-93637-5, OCLC 754727862
- Richardson, John; Gorbman, Claudia; Vernallis, Carol (2013), The Oxford Handbook of New Audiovisual Aesthetic (I ed.), New York City, United States: Oxford University Press, ISBN 978-0-19-973386-6, OCLC 828626784
- Tucker, Ken (2008), Scarface Nation – The Ultimate Gangster Movie and How It Changed America (I ed.), New York City, United States: St. Martin's Press, ISBN 978-0-312-33059-0, OCLC 213451426
