= Marcus Reichert =

American artist, writer, and filmmaker (1948–2022)

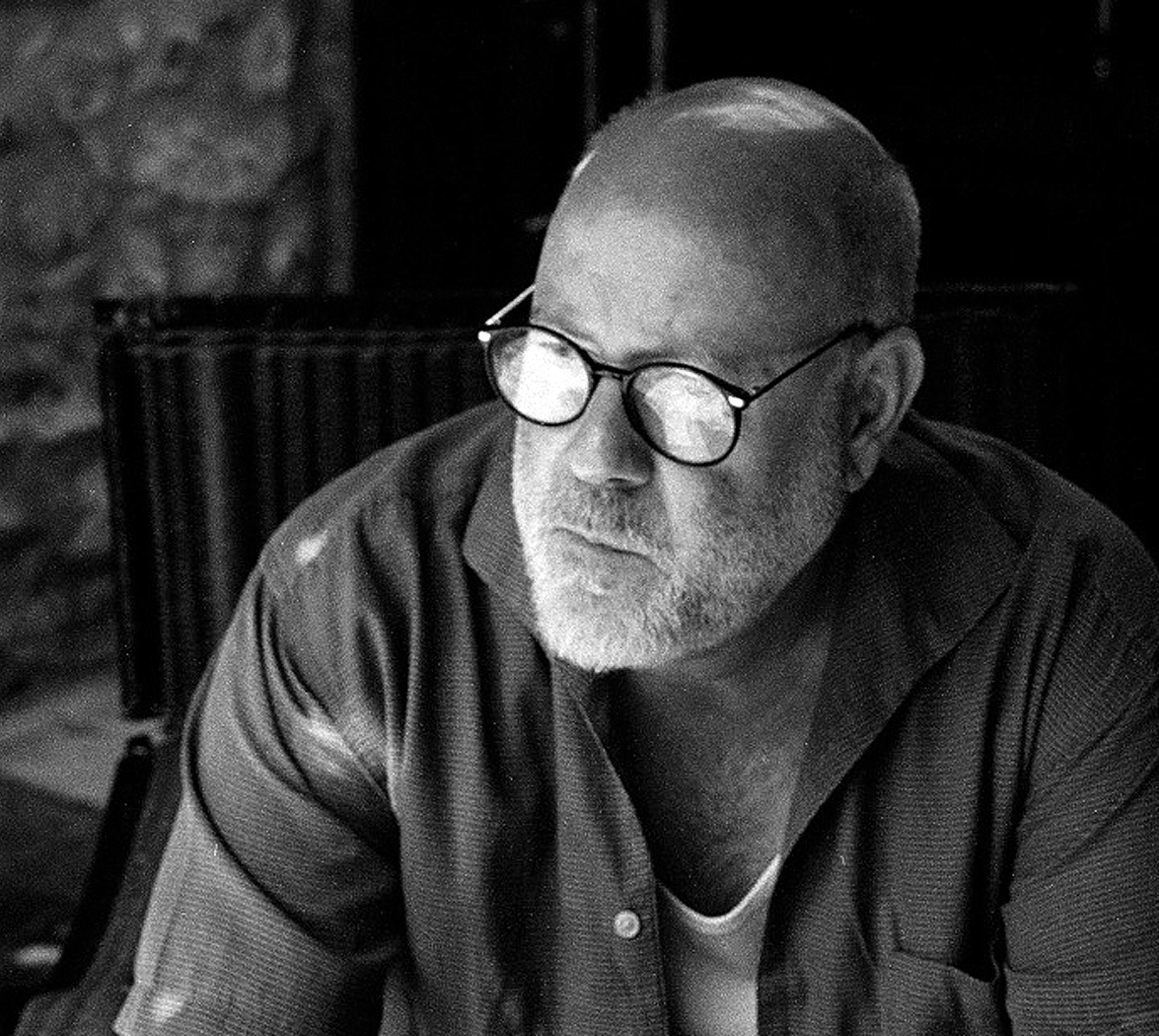
- Reichert in his studio
- Born: June 19, 1948; Bayshore, New York
- Died: January 19, 2022 (aged 73); Nimes, France
- Known for: Painter, Poet, Film-maker

Marcus Reichert (19 June 1948 - 19 January 2022) was an American painter, poet, author, photographer, and film writer/director.

He was given his first exhibition of paintings at the age of twenty-one at the Gotham Book Mart and Art Gallery, New York,. In 1990, he was honored with a retrospective organised by the Hatton Gallery of the University of Newcastle upon Tyne which toured in various forms to Glasgow, London, Paris, and the United States. His Crucifixion paintings have been described by Richard Harries, the Bishop of Oxford, as being among the most disturbing painted in the 20th Century, while the American critic Donald Kuspit has written that both Picasso's and Bacon's pale in comparison. Reichert's neo-noir film Union City, which premiered at the 1980 Cannes Film Festival, was described by Lawrence O'Toole, film critic for Time magazine, as "an unqualified masterpiece." Union City is held in the Film Archive of the Museum of Modern Art, New York, and his complete film works and his poetry and prose comprise the Marcus Reichert Archive at the Bibliothèque nationale de France, Paris.

== Painting ==
From 'Mirages, Transformations, Miracles: Marcus Reichert's Paintings' by Donald Kuspit

Figure or object, face or flower, body or vase, Marcus Reichert's images seem to exist somewhere in the limbo between hallucination and perception. In a hallucination, there's no external object to be observed, however much something seems sensed and present; in a perception, there is such an object, experienced as a “hard fact,” indisputably separate from oneself. There are two kinds of hallucination, the French psychiatrist Jules Baillarger tells us, one psychosensorial, involving the combined action of the imagination and some sense organ, the other psychic, entirely a product of the imagination, with no sensory stimulus. Reichert's hallucinations are of the first kind: his eye is stimulated by the perception of some object external to him, which is then imaginatively transformed into a painted image, producing what Baudelaire famously called a “sensation of the new,” the sort of sensation, as he also said, that a child might have when it saw something for the first time, spontaneously and without preconceptions. The resulting lived experience, as some philosophers would call it, or existential encounter, as others call it, seems miraculous—a sort of miraculous revelation, in which the thing intensely lived seems fresh and wonderful, because one has invested one's own freshness and wonder in it. It is this sense of hallucinatory freshness, combined with a sense that the marvelous is always convulsive, as Breton wrote at the end of Nadja, his account of his relations with a madwoman he met, that we experience in Reichert's paintings. Some are colorful and bright—startlingly luminous, for example in Orange Blossoms, 2008, with its dazzling sky-blue field; others somewhat dark and morbid, which many of the vessel paintings are. The vessel contains the “spirits of the dead,” Reichert writes, suggesting that it is an urn, even when it contains flame-like flowers, suggesting that the dead may be powerful genies ready to escape from it, bringing life with them. Death and resurrection seem a subtheme of Reichert's art, adding to their imaginative aura. The imaginative unconscious, which re-conceives one's perceptions according to “the deepest laws of the soul,” to allude to Baudelaire's classical definition, is clearly hyperactive in Reichert's art...

Whether resolved or unresolved, the contradictions that inform Reichert's art give it an absurd vitality. Indeed, there is an air of “immediate absurdity” to Reichert's works, a sign of surreality – the fusion of dream and reality – as Breton said. Sometimes it has a satirical, caricaturing, ridiculing edge, adding to the sense of disharmony said to be characteristic of modern beauty, as distinct from the harmony of traditional beauty. It always involves what modern philosopher-psychologists call absurdism, involving the sense of isolation that comes with the feeling of living in an irrational world in which one must create one's own reason for being. It is a shaky, groundless world in which catastrophe, personal and social, seems imminent – a godless world in which there is no net to catch one after one falls from grace. The sense of gracelessness become peculiarly graceful pervades Reichert's eccentric lines and forms, adding to the feeling of absurdity that informs Reichert's works. But however one might categorize them stylistically and expressively, what strikes me as particularly meaningful is their uncanny abstractness, self-evident in the Mechanics of the Universe, 2012, subtly evident in the figural works, be the figure a naked body, as in the wraith-like Yellow Nude, 2002, or a vessel, which has a body of its own, and is a symbol of the human body at its most intact. The philosopher Alfred North Whitehead said that abstraction is a “process of emphasis, and emphasis vivifies life,” which is certainly what Reichert's art does. More pointedly, he said that it is “a stripping bare…in order to intensify,” and Reichert's paintings are certainly intense. Films

=== Filmography ===
Selected films of Marcus Reichert:

2004 SUNDAY EVENING, photography, design, and direction by Marcus Reichert for high definition surround sound music DVD; Lazy Curtis, Final Touch Productions Ltd., London (Executive Producer: Chris Smith)

1998 THE SEAWALL MURAL, design and direction by Marcus Reichert for public works fine art project; The Renaissance Project, Thanet Arts Development Office (Advisors: Christina McQuaid, Sam Thomas)

1991 PEOPLE, production design and direction for music video by Marcus Reichert; The Cutaways, Ragin’ Records, Iris Sound / Metropolis Film Studios, Philadelphia (Producer: David Ivory) - MTV Selection

1980 UNION CITY, written and directed by Marcus Reichert; The Tuxedo Company Inc., New York (Producers: Graham Belin, Monty Montgomery, Ron Mutz); owned by Marcus Reichert & Co. and The Museum of Modern Art, New York

1978 WINGS OF ASH (A Dramatization of the Life of Antonin Artaud), pilot for feature film, written and directed by Marcus Reichert; Silver Screen Productions Inc., New York and Mick Jagger, London (Producers: Monty Montgomery, Marcus Reichert)Available for private viewing: Marcus Reichert Archive, the Bibliothèque nationale de France, Paris.

1977 LE GRAND SILENCE, written, produced, and directed by Marcus Reichert; Silver Screen Productions Inc., New York

1968 SILENT SONATA, written and directed by Marcus Reichert and Akira Arita; Rhode Island School of Design

== Photography ==
=== Monographs (photography) ===
- Gooding, Mel (2003). Reichert: The Human Edifice. London: Artmedia Press. ISBN 190288907X. 100 colour photographs from 30 years of the artist's work.
- Reichert, Marcus (2011). Portrait of the Artist's Wife: Photographs 1966/2011. London: Ziggurat Books. ISBN 9780956657947.

== Writing ==
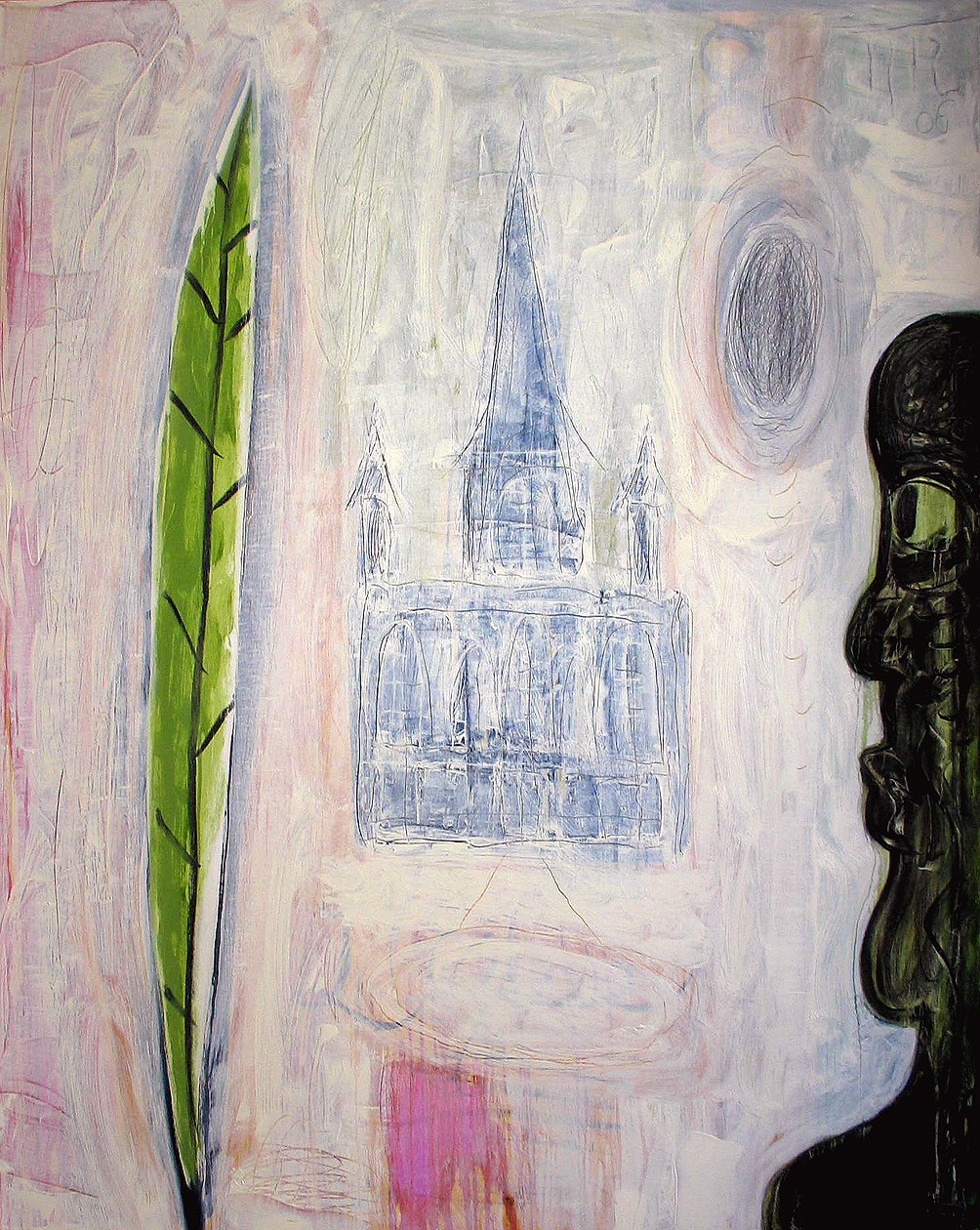
Leaf and Head 2006

Books about or by Marcus Reichert:

- Verdon Angster: A Novel BurnhillWolf Books, Lenoir, North Carolina, U.S. ISBN 0964565501.
- The Miracle of Fontana’s Monkey: A Novel BurnhillWolf Books, Lenoir, North Carolina. ISBN 0964565536.
- Hoboken: A Novel Ziggurat Books International, London & Paris. ISBN 9780956103840.
- Marcus Reichert: Selected Works 1958-1989, Preface by Dr. John Milner, Introduction by Dr. Louise A. DeSalvo. Hatton Gallery, University of Newcastle, U.K.
- Diary of a Seducer, Drawings 1970-71 by Marcus Reichert, Poetry by D.A. Blyler. A Gallery Americas Book, Carrboro, North Carolina, U.S.
- Displaced Person: Poetry, Pornography & Politics, Introduction by Simon Lane. Ziggurat Books, London. The book features selected writing from 1970 to 2005, including Reichert's controversial political articles for the internet, confessional poetry, and excerpts from his three novels. ISBN 9781900439046.
- Art & Ego: Marcus Reichert in Conversation with Edward Rozzo Introduction by Simon Lane. Ziggurat Books, London. ISBN 9780954665654.
- Les Fleurs: The Studies. Images by Marcus Reichert, Introduction by Adam Adelson. Ziggurat Books International, London & Paris, 2013. ISBN 9780957391123.
- Tableaux: Paintings 2002-2012 by Marcus Reichert, Preface by Adam Adelson, Introduction by Donald Kuspit. Ziggurat Books International, London & Paris, 2015. ISBN 9780957391154.
- Mortal, prose and poetry by Marcus Reichert and Donald Kuspit, Ziggurat Books, London, 2016 ISBN 9780957391161.
- Disillusion, paintings by Marcus Reichert and poetry by Donald Kuspit, Ziggurat Books, London, 2018 (limited edition) ISBN 978-1-9164911-0-6.

== Death ==
Marcus Reichert died on January 19, 2022, in Nimes, France.
