= The Hardest Part (Blondie song) =

1980 Blondie song

Single by Blondie

from the album Eat to the Beat
- B-side: "Sound-A-Sleep"
- Released: December 1979
- Genre: Funk rock
- Length: 3:42
- Label: Chrysalis
- Songwriters: Chris Stein; Debbie Harry
- Producer: Mike Chapman

Blondie singles chronology
"Union City Blue" (1979)	"The Hardest Part" (1979)	"Call Me" (1980)

Audio sample
- The Hardest Part: file; help

Music video
- "The Hardest Part" on YouTube

"The Hardest Part" is a 1979 song by the American new wave band Blondie. In North America, it was released as the second single from the band's fourth album, Eat to the Beat; in Europe, "Union City Blue" was released as the second single instead. It was written by the group's principal songwriting partnership, Deborah Harry and Chris Stein. The single achieved minor success, reaching No. 84 and No. 86 on the Billboard Hot 100 and RPM 100 Singles respectively.

== Overview ==
The song describes an armored car robbery. The title refers to the driver of the armored truck: "The hardest part of the armored guard, big man of steel behind the steering wheel."

Chris Stein said, "That was the first white funk song ever recorded. It was heavy metal funk, genre-breaking stuff."

== Reception ==
Billboard considered "The Hardest Part" to be the best song on Eat to the Beat, describing it as "a solid rock - disco number featuring...icily effective vocals" and containing an "infectious" hook. Cash Box said it has a "harder-edged groove" than "Dreaming" and remarked that "Harry punches out the vocals with assurance". Record World said that the "powerful rock dance beat & Harry's vocals are superb."

== Music video ==
As with all songs on the album, a music video was produced to promote the single. It features Debbie Harry in a long dark wig wearing a dress designed by Anya Phillips, who also designed the pink dress featured on the cover of the band's 1977 album Plastic Letters. The video was directed by David Mallett and featured a setting graffitied by Jean-Michel Basquiat, Lee Quiñones, and Fab 5 Freddy.

== Track listing ==
US 7" (CHS 2408, December 1979)

1. "The Hardest Part" (Deborah Harry, Chris Stein) – 3:42
2. "Sound-A-Sleep" (Deborah Harry, Chris Stein) – 4:18

== Chart performance ==
Chart (1980)	Peak position
Canada (RPM 100 Singles)	86
US Billboard Hot 100	84
