= Atomic (song) =

1980 single by Blondie

- US single picture sleeve

Single by Blondie

from the album Eat to the Beat
- B-side: "Die Young, Stay Pretty"
- Released: February 1980
- Recorded: 1979
- Genre: Dance-rock; disco; pop; new wave
- Length: 4:35 (album version); 3:48 (single edit)
- Label: Chrysalis
- Songwriters: Debbie Harry; Jimmy Destri
- Producer: Mike Chapman

Blondie singles chronology
"Call Me" (1980)	"Atomic" (1980)	"The Tide Is High" (1980)

Audio sample
- file; help

Music video
- "Atomic" on YouTube

"Atomic" is a song by American rock band Blondie from their fourth studio album, Eat to the Beat (1979). Written by Debbie Harry and Jimmy Destri and produced by Mike Chapman, the song was released in February 1980 as the album's third single.

"Atomic" is widely considered one of Blondie's best songs. In 2017, Billboard ranked the song number six on their list of the 10 greatest Blondie songs, and in 2021, The Guardian ranked the song number two on their list of the 20 greatest Blondie songs.

== Composition ==
"Atomic" was composed by Jimmy Destri and Debbie Harry, who (in the book 1000 UK #1 Hits by Jon Kutner and Spencer Leigh) stated, "He was trying to do something like 'Heart of Glass', and then somehow or another we gave it the Spaghetti Western treatment. Before that it was just lying there like a lox. The lyrics, well, a lot of the time I would write while the band were just playing the song and trying to figure it out. I would just be scatting along with them and I would just start going, 'Ooooooh, your hair is beautiful.'" The word atomic in the song carries no fixed meaning and functions as a signifier of power and futurism.

The song was produced as a mixture of new wave, rock and disco which had proven to be so successful in their number-one single from earlier in 1979, "Heart of Glass". It is written in E natural minor. Billboard described "Atomic" as an "electronic enhanced dance number" in which the vocals blend with the instrumental music. Cash Box said that it continues "the rock-dance fission, or rather fusion, with '60s inspired surf guitars and ground zero drumming."

The 1980 single version of "Atomic" was a remix. The original 4:35 version as featured on the albums Eat to the Beat and 1981's The Best of Blondie opens with an intro inspired by the nursery rhyme "Three Blind Mice" and includes an instrumental break with a bass guitar solo. The 7″ version mixed by Mike Chapman omits the "Three Blind Mice" intro and replaces the instrumental break with a repeat of the verse.

== Release and reception ==
The song was released in February 1980 and became the band's third number one in the UK Singles Chart, where it held the top spot for two weeks. Record World called it an "electronic dancer." It reached the Top 40 on the US Billboard Hot 100 in Spring 1980.

The B-side was "Die Young, Stay Pretty", also from the album Eat to the Beat, a reggae-influenced track, a style the band would perform again in their global chart-topper "The Tide Is High". The UK 12" single contained a live cover version of David Bowie's "Heroes" featuring Robert Fripp on guitar recorded at London's Hammersmith Odeon just a month before. The track was included on 1993's rarities compilation, Blonde and Beyond.

"Atomic" was remixed and re-released in the UK in September 1994 where it peaked at number 19 on the UK Singles Chart. The subsequent April 1995 US release reached number one on the Billboard Dance/Club Play Chart. The 1994 remix was included on the compilations The Platinum Collection, Beautiful - The Remix Album and Remixed Remade Remodeled - The Remix Project. The track was remixed again four years later for the UK compilation Atomic - The Very Best of Blondie and the '98 Xenomania mix was later included on the first Queer as Folk soundtrack album.

In 2014, Blondie re-recorded the song for their compilation album Greatest Hits Deluxe Redux. The compilation was part of a 2-disc set called Blondie 4(0) Ever which included their tenth studio album, Ghosts of Download, and marked the 40th anniversary of the forming of the band.

In 2017, Billboard ranked the song number six on their list of the 10 greatest Blondie songs, and in 2021, The Guardian ranked the song number two on their list of the 20 greatest Blondie songs.

== Music video ==
The accompanying music video for "Atomic" depicts the band performing on stage at what looks like a post-apocalyptic nightclub in which Debbie Harry is wearing a garbage bag as a punkish futuristic costume. The audience at the club are also dressed in suitably futuristic costumes, and footage of a horseman with the "Blondie: in the disco" New Year's concert advertisement. and an atomic explosion are also intercut. The video features late supermodel Gia Carangi dancing. The horse "valet" seen in the opening is played by artist Jean-Michel Basquiat.

== Track listing ==
- UK 7" (Chrysalis CHS 2410)
- US 7" (Chrysalis CHS 2410)
1. "Atomic" (7" Mix) (Deborah Harry, Jimmy Destri) – 3:48
2. "Die Young Stay Pretty" (Deborah Harry, Chris Stein) – 3:27
- UK 12" (Chrysalis CHS 12 2410)
1. "Atomic" (7" Mix) (Deborah Harry, Jimmy Destri) – 3:48
2. "Die Young Stay Pretty" (Deborah Harry, Chris Stein) – 3:27
3. "Heroes" (Live) (David Bowie, Brian Eno) – 6:28

(Recorded live at The Hammersmith Odeon, London, on January 12, 1980. Produced by C. Stein, J. Destri and P. Maloney.)

- UK 1994 Remix CD1 (7243 8 81661 2 6)
1. "Atomic" (Diddy's Edit) – 4:10
2. "Atomic" (Diddy's 12" Mix) – 6:54
3. "Atomic" (Diddy's Push The Button Mix) – 6:06
4. "Atomic" (Boom Mix) – 5:49
5. "Atomic" (New Disco Mix) – 7:56
- UK 1994 Remix CD2 (7243 8 81662 2 5)
1. "Atomic" (Diddy's Edit) – 4:10
2. "Sunday Girl" – 3:01
3. "Union City Blue" – 3:18
4. "Atomic" (Original 1980 7" Edit) – 3:50
- US 1995 Remix CD (7243 8 58340 2 8)
1. "Atomic" (Diddy's Remix Edit) – 4:10 *
2. "Atomic" (Original Single Version) – 3:50 **
3. "Atomic" (Diddy's 12" Mix) – 6:54
4. "Atomic" (Armand's Atomizer Mix) – 9:00
5. "Atomic" (Explosive Ecstasy Mix) – 5:50
6. "Atomic" (Beautiful Drum and Bass Mix) – 7:43
7. "Atomic" (New Disco Mix) – 7:56
8. "Slow Motion" (Stripped Down Motown Mix) – 3:30

(* Identical to the UK Diddy's Edit version.) (** Identical to the UK Original 1980 7" Edit version.)

== Charts ==
=== Weekly charts ===
Chart (1980)	Peak position
Australia (Kent Music Report)	12
Austria (Ö3 Austria Top 40)	5
Belgium (Ultratop 50 Flanders)	8
Canada Top Singles (RPM)	57
Ireland (IRMA)	3
Luxembourg (Radio Luxembourg)	1
Netherlands (Dutch Top 40)	29
Netherlands (Single Top 100)	17
New Zealand (Recorded Music NZ)	7
Norway (VG-lista)	5
South Africa (Springbok Radio)	16
UK Singles (Official Charts)	1
US Billboard Hot 100	39
US Cash Box Top 100	49
West Germany (GfK)	20

Chart (1994–1995)	Peak position
Australia (ARIA)	98
UK Singles (Official Charts)	19
UK Dance (Official Charts)	10
UK Dance (Music Week)	10
UK Club Chart (Music Week)	51
US Dance Club Songs (Billboard)	1

=== Year-end charts ===
Chart (1980)	Position
Australia (Kent Music Report)	55
Belgium (Ultratop 50 Flanders)	46
New Zealand (RIANZ)	46
UK Singles (OCC)	21

Chart (1995)	Position
US Dance Club Play (Billboard)	46

=== Certifications ===
Region	Certification	Certified units/sales
United Kingdom (BPI)	Platinum	600,000^{‡}
^{‡} Sales+streaming figures based on certification alone.

== Party Animals version ==
"Atomic"

Single by Party Animals

from the album Party@worldaccess.nl
- Released: May 10, 1997
- Genre: Happy hardcore, gabber
- Length: 3:27
- Label: Mokum
- Songwriters: Debbie Harry, Jimmy Destri
- Producers: Flamman & Abraxas

Party Animals singles chronology
"We Like to Party" (1997)	"Atomic" (1997)	"My Way" (1997)

"Atomic" was covered by Dutch group Party Animals and released as the fifth single from their second album, Party@worldaccess.nl (1997). The song was released in 1997 and was a minor success in Hong Kong. The song is a cover version of the Blondie song recorded with a gabber beat. The song peaked at number 8 in the Dutch Top 40.

=== Track listing ===
1. "Atomic" (Flamman & Abraxas radio mix) – 3:31
2. "Mocht Ik onder het Hakkûh Bezwijken" – 5:32
3. "Atom-X" – 4:52
4. "Total Smash" – 5:15

=== Weekly charts ===
Chart (1997)	Peak position
Netherlands (Dutch Top 40)	8
Netherlands (Single Top 100)	6

=== Year-end charts ===
Chart (1997)	Position
Netherlands (Dutch Top 40)	41
Netherlands (Single Top 100)	51

== In other media ==
The album version was featured in Grand Theft Auto Vice City as one of the track playing on in-game Wave 103 radio station. The song was also covered by the British rock band Sleeper which was featured in the Trainspotting soundtrack.

== See also ==
- List of number-one singles from the 1980s (UK)
- List of number-one dance singles of 1995 (U.S.)
