= French Kissin (song) =

1986 single by Debbie Harry

Single by Debbie Harry

from the album Rockbird
- B-side: "Rockbird"
- Released: November 3, 1986
- Length: 5:14
- Label: Geffen; Chrysalis
- Songwriter: Chuck Lorre
- Producer: Seth Justman

Debbie Harry singles chronology
"Feel the Spin" (1985)	"French Kissin" (1986)	"Free to Fall" (1987)

Music video
- "French Kissin" on YouTube

Audio sample
- "French Kissin": file; help

"French Kissin" (released in certain countries as "French Kissin in the USA") is a song by American singer Debbie Harry from her second solo studio album, Rockbird (1986). It is a cover version of the 1985 song originally recorded by Carol Chapman, written by Chuck Lorre, who would become widely known as a television producer. Harry's version was released on November 3, 1986, as the lead single from Rockbird and became a top-10 hit in Australia, Ireland, New Zealand, South Africa, and the United Kingdom.

== Overview ==
In the United Kingdom, "French Kissin" was released as the album's lead single on November 3, 1986, and became Harry's biggest chart hit, reaching number eight on the UK singles chart and becoming her only solo top-10 single there. In the United States, the song peaked at number 57 on the Billboard Hot 100.

For promotion, Harry did a live performance of "French Kissin" and "In Love with Love" on Saturday Night Live, as well as a handful of television interviews in the UK and US in late 1986. A music video (featuring several women including a few short sequences by actress Katey Sagal) was filmed in Beverly Hills. Pop artist Andy Warhol and fashion designer Stephen Sprouse collaborated on a camouflage-patterned dress for Harry to wear in the music video, but she ultimately did not wear it.

Besides the regular 7-inch and 12-inch formats, the single was also released as a limited-edition 12-inch picture disc in the UK.

Harry also recorded a French-language version of the track which was released as the B-side of other Rockbird singles and was also included on the 1988 Blondie/Debbie Harry remix compilation Once More into the Bleach.

The song was originally released by Carol Chapman in 1985, as the B-side of the single "Bad Dreams in Hollywood", the only release Chapman ever did. Chapman's song was used by two movies: Can't Buy Me Love (1987) and Troop Beverly Hills (1989). The song was written by Chuck Lorre.

== Track listings ==
7-inch single

A. "French Kissin" (Chuck Lorre) – 4:09
B. "Rockbird" (Deborah Harry, Chris Stein) – 3:09

US 12-inch single

A1. "French Kissin" (dance mix) (Lorre) – 7:25
A2. "French Kissin" (edit) (Lorre) – 4:09
B1. "French Kissin" (dub version) (Lorre) – 8:02
B2. "Rockbird" (Harry, Stein) – 3:09

UK and Australasian 12-inch single

A1. "French Kissin in the USA" (dance mix) (Lorre) – 7:25
B1. "French Kissin in the USA" (dub version) (Lorre) – 8:02
B2. "Rockbird" (Harry, Stein) – 3:09

Australasian cassette single

1. "French Kissin in the USA" (7-inch version) (Lorre)
2. "French Kissin in the USA" (dance mix) (Lorre)
3. "French Kissin in the USA" (dub version) (Lorre)
4. "Rockbird" (Harry, Stein)

== Charts ==
=== Weekly charts ===
Weekly chart performance for "French Kissin"
Chart (1986–1987)	Peak position
Australia (Australian Music Report)	4
Belgium (Ultratop 50 Flanders)	15
Canada Top Singles (RPM)	95
Europe (European Hot 100 Singles)	33
Finland (Suomen virallinen lista)	29
Ireland (IRMA)	8
Luxembourg (Radio Luxembourg)	2
Netherlands (Dutch Top 40)	25
Netherlands (Single Top 100)	32
New Zealand (Recorded Music NZ)	2
South Africa (Springbok Radio)	8
UK Singles (Official Charts)	8
US Billboard Hot 100	57
US Dance Singles Sales (Billboard) Remix	44
US Cash Box Top 100 Singles	51
West Germany (GfK)	28

=== Year-end charts ===
1986 year-end chart performance for "French Kissin"
Chart (1986)	Position
UK Singles (Gallup)	89

1987 year-end chart performance for "French Kissin"
Chart (1987)	Position
Australia (Australian Music Report)	29
New Zealand (RIANZ)	34
