= KooKoo =

Studio album by Debbie Harry
- Released: July 27, 1981
- Recorded: 1981
- Studios: Power Station, New York City
- Genres: Funk; art rock
- Length: 42:27
- Label: Chrysalis
- Producers: Nile Rodgers; Bernard Edwards

Debbie Harry chronology
KooKoo (1981)	Rockbird (1986)

Singles from KooKoo
- 1. "Backfired" Released: July 1981; 2. "The Jam Was Moving" Released: 1981

KooKoo is the debut solo album by American singer Debbie Harry, released on July 27, 1981, by Chrysalis Records. Produced by Nile Rodgers and Bernard Edwards of Chic, the album was recorded while Harry took a break from her band Blondie. It was a moderate commercial success, reaching number 25 on the US Billboard 200 and number six on the UK Albums Chart.

== Background ==
KooKoo was recorded while Harry and boyfriend Chris Stein were taking a break from the band Blondie. The album was produced by Nile Rodgers and Bernard Edwards of the R&B band Chic, who had just had major success working with Diana Ross on her 1980 album Diana. Harry and Stein first met the pair at the Power Station recording studio in New York while Blondie were recording their 1979 album Eat to the Beat, and they remained good friends in the intervening years. KooKoo was one of three albums to be (co)written and produced by Rodgers and Edwards in 1981, the other two being Chic's fifth album Take It Off and Johnny Mathis' I Love My Lady, which remained unreleased until 2017.

KooKoo showcased the early fusion of funk, rock and dance music that would become the trademark of Rodgers and Edwards, and this style would later be evident on albums such as David Bowie's Let's Dance, Duran Duran's Notorious, the Power Station's self-titled debut album, and Robert Palmer's Riptide. Backing vocals were provided by Mark Mothersbaugh and Gerald Casale of Devo, credited as Spud and Pud Devo.

== Promotion ==
The cover art for the album was created by Swiss artist H.R. Giger, known for his design work on the 1979 sci-fi/horror film Alien. Based on a photograph of Harry taken by the renowned photographer Brian Aris, Giger created several variations of the cover (another of which is seen on the album's inner sleeve) in what Harry described as a combination of punk, acupuncture and sci-fi. Although the lyrics to the track "Oasis" include the word "kookoo" (meaning "crazy"), Harry stated that the album title came to her after she saw Giger's completed work, and although she had misgivings about the conceptual ideas behind the artwork (as she did not identify either the album or herself as "punk"), she was suitably impressed to use it anyway.

For the promotion of KooKoo, Chrysalis Records planned to display large posters of the album cover in various stations of the London Underground. However, officials deemed the image of Harry with metal skewers going through her face and neck to be too disturbing. A television ad campaign went ahead, however.

Promo videos were made for the tracks "Backfired" and "Now I Know You Know", both directed by Giger and filmed at his studio in Switzerland. "Backfired" featured a dark-haired Harry dancing superimposed over a backdrop of Giger's distinctive artwork, with Giger himself appearing in a semi-translucent face mask. "Now I Know You Know" featured Harry in a long black wig and a form-fitting bodysuit painted with Giger's unusual artwork, dancing around in a small set furnished with Giger's "bio-mechanical" design work.

=== Singles ===
Two singles were released from the album: "Backfired", which peaked at number 24 in Australia, number 32 in the UK and number 43 in the US in August 1981, and "The Jam Was Moving", which reached number 82 in the US.

A third single, "Chrome", was only released in some parts of Europe, but failed to chart. Another track, "Jump Jump", was only released as a single in Peru.

"Chrome" served as the B-side to "The Jam was Moving", only being issued in Germany as a single and in the US as a promotional 12-inch single only.

== Reception ==
Professional ratings
Review scores
Source	Rating
AllMusic	1.5/5 stars
Rolling Stone	2/5 stars
Christgau's Record Guide	B−
Sounds	4/5 stars

KooKoo reached number six on the UK Albums Chart and spent seven weeks on the chart, being certified silver by the British Phonographic Industry (BPI) for shipments in excess of 60,000 copies. The album reached number 25 on the US Billboard 200 and was certified gold by the Recording Industry Association of America (RIAA), denoting shipments in excess of 500,000 copies.

In The Boston Phoenix, Ken Emerson gave the album a mixed review, writing that "Harry comes across on KooKoo as inaccessible, invulnerable, and creepy. The congealment of her character that began with the success of Heart of Glass is now complete: she’s an ice-cold icon. ... [T]hough KooKoo lacks the playful energy and innocence of Parallel Lines (1978), Blondie’s best album, it’s far more accomplished and fully realized than either of the band’s subsequent LPs. ... You may dislike the destination, but KooKoo knows exactly where it’s going." Rob Sheffield wrote in the Spin Alternative Record Guide (1995), "KooKoo is disappointingly diffuse, and it's easy to hear what went wrong: while Harry meekly imitates the suave funk of Chic's classic Real People, Rodgers reverts to his true roots in European art-rock."

Writing for Popmatters in 2021, Rich Wilhelm described it as "a flawed but beguiling experiment that paved the way for Let's Dance and Like a Virgin".

== Reissues ==
KooKoo was digitally remastered and re-issued on compact disc with two bonus tracks (the 12″ versions of "Backfired" and "The Jam Was Moving") by EMI in the United Kingdom in 1994, and by Razor & Tie in the United States in 1999, this time with just one bonus track.

The album was reissued again in the US by Gold Legion.com in 2011 (the 30th anniversary of the album's release). This reissue includes three bonus tracks (both of the aforementioned 12″ versions, and also the rare extended mix of "Inner City Spillover") as well as extensive liner notes.

In May 2023, a deluxe edition with bonus tracks was released, including 2LP edition consisting of the original album and a bonus disk of remixes pressed in transparent vinyl, and a lenticular cover.

== Track listing ==
Side A:

1. "Jump Jump" (Deborah Harry, Chris Stein) – 4:04
2. "The Jam Was Moving" (Bernard Edwards, Nile Rodgers) – 2:59
3. "Chrome" (Harry, Stein) – 4:17
4. "Surrender" (Edwards, Rodgers) – 3:37
5. "Inner City Spillover" (Harry, Stein) – 5:04

Side B:

1. "Backfired" (Edwards, Rodgers) – 4:54
2. "Now I Know You Know" (Edwards, Rodgers) – 5:39
3. "Under Arrest" (Edwards, Harry, Rodgers, Stein) – 3:03
4. "Military Rap" (Harry, Stein) – 3:51
5. "Oasis" (Edwards, Harry, Rodgers, Stein) – 4:59

Bonus tracks on 1994 UK CD reissue

11. "Backfired" (12" Mix) – 6:23
12. "The Jam Was Moving" (12" Mix) – 5:03

Bonus track on 1999 US CD reissue

11. "Backfired" (12" Mix) – 6:23

Bonus tracks on 2011 CD reissue

11. "Backfired" (Extended Version) – 6:23
12. "The Jam Was Moving" (Extended Version) – 5:03
13. "Inner City Spillover" (Extended Version) – 5:58

Additional bonus tracks on 2023 reissue

14. "Backfired" (Bruce Forrest & Frank Heller Remix) – 6:08
15. "The Jam Was Moving" (Chris Stein & Debbie Harry Remix) – 3:31

== Personnel ==
=== Musicians ===
- Debbie Harry – vocals
- Nile Rodgers – guitar, vocals on "Backfired"
- Bernard Edwards – bass guitar
- Tony Thompson – drums
- Robert Sabino – keyboards
- Raymond Jones – keyboards
- Nathaniel S. Hardy Jr. – keyboards
- Chris Stein – guitar
- Vinnie Della Rocca – horns
- Ray Maldonado – horns
- Sammy Figueroa – percussion
- Manolo Badrena – percussion
- Roger Squitero – percussion
- Spud Devo – backing vocals
- Pud Devo – backing vocals
- Gordon Grody – backing vocals
- Fonzi Thornton – backing vocals
- "Chuck Martin" (Bill Scheniman) – dog bark

=== Production ===
- Nile Rodgers – producer for Chic Organization Ltd.
- Bernard Edwards – producer for Chic Organization Ltd.
- Bill Scheniman – sound engineer
- Jason Corsaro – second engineer
- H. R. Giger – cover concept and painting
- Brian Aris – photography
- Peter Wagg – art direction
- Dennis King – mastering at Atlantic Studios
- Recorded and mixed at The Power Station, NYC

== Charts ==
=== Weekly charts ===
Weekly chart performance for KooKoo
Chart (1981)	Peak position
Australian Albums (Kent Music Report)	16
Canada Top Albums/CDs (RPM)	17
New Zealand Albums (RMNZ)	17
Norwegian Albums (VG-lista)	24
Swedish Albums (Sverigetopplistan)	7
UK Albums (Official Charts)	6
US Billboard 200	25

2023 weekly chart performance for KooKoo
Chart (2023)	Peak position
Scottish Albums (Official Charts)	20
UK Independent Albums (Official Charts)	9

=== Year-end charts ===
Year-end chart performance for KooKoo
Chart (1981)	Position
Canada Top Albums/CDs (RPM)	93

== Certifications ==
Certifications for KooKoo
Region	Certification	Certified units/sales
Canada (Music Canada)	Gold	50,000^{^}
United Kingdom (BPI)	Silver	60,000^{^}
United States (RIAA)	Gold	500,000^{^}
^{^} Shipments figures based on certification alone.
