= American Gigolo (soundtrack) =

Soundtrack album by Giorgio Moroder
- Released: 1980
- Recorded: 1979
- Studios: Westlake Audio, Los Angeles, California
- Genre: Pop
- Length: 36:26
- Label: Polydor
- Producer: Giorgio Moroder

Singles from American Gigolo
- 1. "Call Me" Released: 1980; 2. "Night Drive" Released: 1980; 3. "The Seduction" Released: 1980; 4. "Love And Passion" Released: 1980

Professional ratings
Review scores
Source	Rating
AllMusic	link
Smash Hits	7/10

American Gigolo is the soundtrack album to the 1980 film of the same name, starring Richard Gere and Lauren Hutton. The music was composed and performed by Italian musician Giorgio Moroder and was released worldwide on the Polydor label. It peaked at number 7 on the Billboard 200 album chart. All the cuts from the soundtrack also went to number two for five weeks on the disco/dance charts.

== Overview ==
"Call Me" by Blondie is the lead song for the soundtrack and was played during the film's intro. The song, which in the early stages was an instrumental demo titled "Man Machine", had originally been offered to Fleetwood Mac's Stevie Nicks, but Nicks was unable to work with Moroder due to a clause in her recording contract and Blondie instead recorded the song with lyrics by lead vocalist Debbie Harry. The single, released on Blondie's label Chrysalis Records in February 1980, was a number one hit in the US, Canada and the UK, and a top ten hit in most other parts of the world. It was No. 1 on the US Billboard charts for six weeks and named Billboard's No. 1 song of 1980. The song is listed at No. 44 on Billboard's All Time Top 100. In 1981, the song was also nominated for a Grammy Award for Best Rock Performance by a Duo or Group with Vocal. The band also recorded a Spanish-language version of "Call Me", titled "Llamame", released both in the US and South America. Giorgio Moroder's instrumental track "Night Drive", another variation on the "Man Machine"/"Call Me" theme, was also issued as a single in certain territories.

The song "Love and Passion" was written by director Paul Schrader and Moroder and was performed by Cheryl Barnes, and can be heard in the movie in the gay nightclub scene (filmed at Los Angeles gay club The Probe, which opened in 1978) where Gere's character Julian goes to find Leon, his pimp.

The Giorgio Moroder instrumental "The Seduction (Love Theme)" was also recorded by German bandleader James Last as a saxophone tune featuring David Sanborn (uncredited). This cover version peaked at number 28 in the Billboard Hot 100 in May 1980.

Not featured on the soundtrack but played in film is John Hiatt's "Take Off Your Uniform", which was featured on his 1979 album Slug Line.

American Gigolo was one of two soundtrack albums to be written and produced by Moroder in 1980, the other being Foxes, which included Donna Summer's hit single "On the Radio" as well as tracks by Janis Ian and Cher.

In 1979, Moroder had won an Academy Award for Original Music Score for his soundtrack to Midnight Express. At the same ceremony, Donna Summer's "Last Dance", produced by Moroder from the soundtrack to Thank God It's Friday, won an Academy Award for best song (as well as a Golden Globe). Following the success of American Gigolo and Blondie's "Call Me" in 1980, Moroder went on to compose and produce for several more soundtracks throughout the 1980s. These included Cat People – including David Bowie's single "Cat People (Putting Out Fire)" (1982), Flashdance – including Irene Cara's "Flashdance... What a Feeling" (1983), Scarface – including Debbie Harry's "Rush Rush" (1983), Metropolis and Freddie Mercury's "Love Kills" (1984) and Top Gun including Berlin's "Take My Breath Away" (1986).

The American Gigolo soundtrack album has been re-issued on CD by both PolyGram and its successor company Universal Music.

== Track listing ==
All tracks written by Giorgio Moroder except where noted.

Side A

1. "Call Me (Theme from American Gigolo)" (Giorgio Moroder, Deborah Harry) – 8:05
  - Performed by Blondie
2. "Love and Passion" (Giorgio Moroder, Paul Schrader) – 5:51
  - Vocals by Cheryl Barnes
3. "Night Drive" – 3:54

Side B

1. "Hello Mr. W.A.M. (Finale)" – 4:36
  - Based on the second movement of the clarinet concerto K. 622 in A Major by Wolfgang Amadeus Mozart.
2. "The Apartment" – 4:31
3. "Palm Springs Drive" – 3:25
4. "Night Drive (Reprise)" – 2:52
5. "The Seduction (Love Theme)" – 3:13

== Personnel ==
- Giorgio Moroder – producer
- Harold Faltermeyer – arranger, keyboards
- Keith Forsey – drums, percussion
- Blondie – performance of "Call Me"
- Cheryl Barnes – vocals
- Mixed and mastered at Allen Zentz Recording.

== Charts ==
=== Weekly charts ===
Weekly chart performance for American Gigolo
Chart (1980)	Peak position
Australian Albums (Kent Music Report)	79
Canada Top Albums/CDs (RPM)	17
Finnish Albums (Suomen virallinen lista)	14
US Billboard 200	7

=== Year-end charts ===
Year-end chart performance for American Gigolo
Chart (1980)	Position
Canada Top Albums/CDs (RPM)	73
US Billboard 200	69
US Soundtrack Albums (Billboard)	4

== Certifications ==
Certifications for American Gigolo
Region	Certification	Certified units/sales
Hong Kong (IFPI Hong Kong)	Gold	10,000^{*}
United States (RIAA)	Gold	500,000^{^}
^{*} Sales figures based on certification alone.^{^} Shipments figures based on certification alone.
