= Diddy (DJ) =

British DJ (born 1966)

Richard Dearlove (born 1966, London, England), better known by his stage name Diddy, is an English DJ.

He is responsible for the dance hit and Feverpitch/Positiva/EMI release "Give Me Love", which peaked at No. 23 on the UK Singles Chart in July 1997. He also undertook a number of Blondie single remixes for Chrysalis Records. His remix of Blondie's "Atomic" reached No. 1 on the U.S. Billboard Hot Dance Club Play chart.

In 2006, Dearlove successfully sued American rapper Sean Combs, who at that time used the stage name P. Diddy. Combs wanted to change his stage name to simply Diddy, but the terms of Dearlove's settlement ordered Combs to pay him significant damages and barred him from releasing music under the name Diddy in the UK. The following year, Combs was ordered to drop a lyric in which he called himself "Diddy" when he performs at Wembley Arena.
