= Rockbird =

Studio album by Debbie Harry
- Released: November 15, 1986
- Recorded: 1986
- Studio: Mayfair, New York City; Unique, New York City; Electric Lady, New York City; Sorcerer Sound, New York City; Power Station, New York City; A&R, New York City; Mission Control, Boston
- Genre: Rock; new wave
- Length: 39:18
- Label: Geffen
- Producer: Seth Justman

Debbie Harry chronology
KooKoo (1981)	Rockbird (1986)	Once More into the Bleach (1988)

Singles from Rockbird
- 1. "French Kissin' in the USA" Released: November 1986; 2. "Free to Fall" Released: February 1987; 3. "In Love with Love" Released: April 1987

Professional ratings
Review scores
Source	Rating
AllMusic	4.5/5 stars
Robert Christgau	B
The Encyclopedia of Popular Music	2/5 stars
MusicHound Rock: The Essential Album Guide	2.5/5 stars
The New Rolling Stone Album Guide	2/5 stars
Smash Hits	7/10 stars
Sounds	3.5/5 stars

Rockbird is the second solo studio album by American singer Debbie Harry. It was released in November 1986 by Geffen Records in the United States and Chrysalis Records in the United Kingdom.

== Background ==
Rockbird was released four years after the split of Blondie in 1982. Harry had largely put her music career on hold during the mid-1980s in order to look after Blondie guitarist and boyfriend Chris Stein, who had been diagnosed with a serious illness. The album was produced by Seth Justman, a key member of the J. Geils Band. Released in November 1986, there were four variations of the album artwork with the lettering in either green, orange, pink and yellow (with slight variations due to printing techniques).

A stylized version of the album's cover photo appears on the cover of select editions of the book 1001 Albums You Must Hear Before You Die.

== Critical reception ==
Trouser Press wrote that the album "paves a pop path Harry can navigate, but the material is weak." The Los Angeles Times wrote that "the songs--which tend to be about ne’er-do-well boyfriends and romantic escapades--are tethered to jacked-up rhythms that don’t go down so well on the dance floor." Chris Heath of Smash Hits magazine was more positive, giving the album 7 out of 10 and stating "Nothing else is quite as brilliant as the current single "French Kissin' In The USA", but there's plenty of the aggressive sprightly pop songs that Blondie used to do so well, the odd slightly swoonsome ballad, and a couple of throwaway disco songs. How very nice it is to have her back".

== Commercial performance ==
Rockbird peaked at number 31 on the UK Albums Chart, and remained in the charts for 11 weeks. It was certified gold by the British Phonographic Industry (BPI) in January 1987 for shipments in excess of 100,000 copies. In the United States, the album peaked at number 97 on the Billboard 200.

Three singles were released from the album, "French Kissin' in the USA", which reached #8 in the UK, and is Harry's only solo top-10 single in that country, as well as "In Love with Love" and "Free to Fall", which reached #45 and #46, respectively. "French Kissin'" also reached #57 on the US Billboard Hot 100, and #3 in Australia. "In Love with Love" was remixed by Stock Aitken Waterman and reached #1 on the Billboard Hot Dance Club Play chart.

== Track listing ==
All tracks produced by Seth Justman. Side A runs from tracks 1–4 and side B from tracks 5–9 in cassette and vinyl versions.

CD track listing
No.	Title	Writer(s)	Length
1.	"I Want You"	Deborah Harry, Toni C.	4:28
2.	"French Kissin' in the USA"	Chuck Lorre	5:14
3.	"Buckle Up"	Harry, Seth Justman	3:46
4.	"In Love with Love"	Harry, Chris Stein	4:34
5.	"You Got Me in Trouble"	Harry, Justman	4:18
6.	"Free to Fall"	Harry, Justman	5:31
7.	"Rockbird"	Harry, Stein	3:09
8.	"Secret Life"	Harry, Stein	3:46
9.	"Beyond the Limit"	Harry, Nile Rodgers	4:37

== Personnel ==
Musicians

- Deborah Harry – lead vocals, backing vocals (1, 3–9)
- Seth Justman – keyboards, arrangements, bass and drum programming (1, 2, 4, 6–8), backing vocals (1, 3–9)
- Phil Ashley – synthesizer programming, keyboards (1, 2, 4–8), bass and drum programming (1, 2, 4, 6–8)
- Jimmy Rip – guitars
- Toni C. (Antoinette Colandero) – additional guitars (1)
- Chris Stein – additional guitars (4, 7, 8), bass and drum programming (4, 7, 8), additional arrangements (4, 7, 8)
- Neil Jason – bass (3, 5, 6, 9)
- Yogi Horton – drums (3, 6, 9)
- Mickey Curry – drums (5)
- Gordon Gottlieb – percussion (2–4, 8, 9)
- Magic Dick – harmonica (1)
- James White – saxophone solo (1)
- Crispin Cioe – alto sax solo (2), alto saxophone (3, 5, 9), baritone saxophone (3, 5, 9)
- Arno Hecht – tenor saxophone (3, 5, 9)
- Bob Funk – trombone (3, 5, 9)
- Paul Litteral – trumpet (3, 5, 9)
- Jocelyn Brown – backing vocals (1, 2, 5, 6)
- Connie Harvey – backing vocals (1, 2, 5, 6)
- La-Rita Gaskins – backing vocals (1, 2, 5, 6)
- Fonda Rae – backing vocals (3)
- Judith Spears – backing vocals (3)
- Cookie Watkins – backing vocals (3)
- Jay Siegel – backing vocals (4)

Production and artwork

- Seth Justman – producer
- Bill Scheniman – recording, mixing
- John Alters – assistant engineer
- David Avidor – assistant engineer
- Ken Collins – assistant engineer
- Jon Goldberger – assistant engineer
- Jack Kennedy – assistant engineer
- Michael O'Haro – assistant engineer
- Rick Slater – assistant engineer
- Ken Steiger – assistant engineer
- Kent Wagner – assistant engineer
- Greg Calbi – mastering
- Kyle Davis – production coordinator
- Stephen Sprouse – cover design
- Andy Warhol – background painting
- Paula Greif – art direction
- Guzman (Constance Hansen and Russell Peacock) – photography
- Mixed at Counterpoint Studios (New York, NY).
- Mastered at Sterling Sound (New York, NY).

== Charts ==
Chart (1986–1987)	Peak position
Australian (Kent Music Report)	18
European Albums (Music & Media)	78
Finnish Albums (Suomen virallinen lista)	40
New Zealand Albums (RMNZ)	22
Swedish Albums (Sverigetopplistan)	30
UK Albums (OCC)	31
US Billboard 200	97

== Certifications ==
Region	Certification	Certified units/sales
United Kingdom (BPI)	Gold	100,000^{^}
^{^} Shipments figures based on certification alone.
