= Call Me (Blondie song) =

1980 single by Blondie

- Single picture sleeve (US and some other releases used a white background, while most overseas releases used pink)

Single by Blondie

from the album American Gigolo
- B-side: "Call Me" (instrumental) (U.S.)
- Released: February 1, 1980 (US)
- Recorded: August 1979, New York City
- Genre: Dance-rock; new wave; hard rock; Eurodisco
- Length: 2:15 (music video version); 3:32 (radio edit); 8:05 (album version)
- Label: Polydor; Chrysalis; Salsoul
- Songwriters: Debbie Harry; Giorgio Moroder
- Producer: Giorgio Moroder

Blondie singles chronology
"The Hardest Part" (1980)	"Call Me" (1980)	"Atomic" (1980)

Music video
- "Call Me" on YouTube

Alternative cover
- Richard Gere picture sleeve, extracted and derived from the film poster of American Gigolo; also released worldwide

"Call Me" is a song by the American new wave band Blondie and the theme to the 1980 film American Gigolo. Produced and composed by Italian musician Giorgio Moroder, with lyrics by Blondie singer Debbie Harry, the song appeared in the film and its accompanying soundtrack album and was released in the United States in early 1980 as a single.

"Call Me" was number 1 for six consecutive weeks on the Billboard Hot 100, where it became the band's biggest single and second number 1. It also hit number 1 in the UK and Canada, where it became their fourth and second chart-topper, respectively. In the year-end chart of 1980, it was Billboard's number 1 single and RPM magazine's number 3 in Canada.

== Background and recording ==
In 2014, keyboardist-composer Harold Faltermeyer remembered the recording process as having three main sections: first Giorgio Moroder and his music crew recorded an instrumental version of the song at Westlake Recording Studios in Los Angeles, with the tape locked to SMPTE timecode so that it would synchronize with the film. Then the project moved to New York for the Blondie recording session, at which the band surprised Moroder by insisting they would play their own parts. Faltermeyer was engineering when Debbie Harry sang and Chris Stein played electric guitar. Stein's guitar and amplifier were buzzing and noisy, so his setup was repaired to get a clean recording. The band had difficulty locking to sync, so Moroder stopped the unfinished sessions to save time and took the project back to Los Angeles to more quickly add the final parts with his own picked musicians, including a keyboard solo by Faltermeyer.

On the American Gigolo soundtrack album, Blondie the band is credited only for vocals, with other credits naming Moroder's crew of Keith Forsey on drums/percussion and Faltermeyer on keyboards and arrangements. Faltermeyer said the band was angry about being replaced by session players but the song turned out to be very successful, so they took it in stride. Blondie keyboard player Jimmy Destri did not like Faltermeyer's solo and would have preferred his own version.

== Composition and lyrics ==
"Call Me" was composed by Italian disco producer Giorgio Moroder as the main theme song of the 1980 film American Gigolo. It is played in the key of D minor with a tempo of 143 beats per minute, with Debbie Harry's vocals ranging from C_{4} to E_{5}. Moroder originally asked Stevie Nicks from Fleetwood Mac to perform a song for the soundtrack but she was prevented because of a recently signed contract with Modern Records. Moroder turned to Debbie Harry of Blondie, presenting Harry with an instrumental track called "Man Machine". Harry was asked to write the lyrics, a process that Harry states took a mere few hours. The lyrics were written from the perspective of the main character in the film, male prostitute Julian Kay (Richard Gere).

"Call Me"
Debbie Harry wrote the song's lyrics; she was coached by composer Giorgio Moroder to add some Italian- and French-language phrases including "Amore, chiamami" and "Appelle-moi, mon chéri".

Harry said the lyrics were inspired by her visual impressions from watching the film and that "When I was writing it, I pictured the opening scene, driving on the coast of California." The completed song was then recorded by the band, with Moroder producing. The bridge of the original English-language version also includes Harry saying "call me" in two European languages: Italian: Amore, chiamami, lit. 'Love, call me' and French: Appelle-moi, mon chéri, lit. 'Call me, my darling'.

== Release ==
In the US, the song was released by three record companies: the longest version (at 8:06) on the soundtrack album by Polydor, the 7" and 12" on Blondie's label Chrysalis and a Spanish-language 12" version, with lyrics by Buddy and Mary McCluskey, on the disco label Salsoul Records. A Spanish-language version, titled "Llámame", was meant for release in Mexico and some South American countries. This version was also released in the US and the UK and had its CD debut on Chrysalis/EMI's rarities compilation Blonde and Beyond (1993). In 1988, a remixed version by Ben Liebrand taken from the Blondie remix album Once More into the Bleach was issued as a single in the UK. In 2001, the "original long version" appeared as a bonus track on the Autoamerican album re-issue.

In 2014, Blondie re-recorded the song for their compilation album Greatest Hits Deluxe Redux. The compilation was part of a 2-disc set called Blondie 4(0) Ever which included their tenth studio album Ghosts of Download and marked the 40th anniversary of the forming of the band.

Harry recorded an abbreviated version of the song that was backed by the Muppet Band for her guest appearance on The Muppet Show in August 1980. It was first broadcast in January 1981.

== Reception ==
The single was released in the United States in February 1980. It spent six consecutive weeks at number one on the Billboard Hot 100 and was certified Gold (for one million copies sold) by the RIAA. It also spent four weeks at No. 2 on the US dance chart. The single was also number 1 on Billboard magazine's 1980 year-end chart. The song lists at No. 57 on Billboard's All Time Top 100. It was released in the UK two months later, where it became Blondie's fourth UK No. 1 single on the UK singles chart in little over a year. The song was also played on a British Telecom advert in the 1980s.

Record World called "Call Me" a "stirring electronic dance cut". Writing for Stereogum, Tom Breihan graded the song a 10/10, saying it was a "sleek and efficient [...] mechanistic marvel" that "whips you along into the sleazy neon future". In 1981, the song was nominated for a Grammy Award for Best Rock Performance by a Duo or Group with Vocal at the 23rd Annual Grammy Awards, as well as for a Golden Globe for Best Original Song at the 38th Golden Globes.

Twenty-four years after its original release, "Call Me" was ranked at number 289 on the list of Rolling Stone's 500 Greatest Songs of All Time. In 1981, the Village Voice ranked "Call Me" as the third-best song of the year 1980 on its annual year-end critics' poll, Pazz & Jop. In 2017, Billboard ranked the song number three on their list of the 10 greatest Blondie songs, and in 2021, The Guardian ranked the song number four on their list of the 20 greatest Blondie songs.

== Music video ==
There were two videos made:

- One was clips and video footage of Debbie Harry in New York City. The video can be found on the 1991 UK video compilation The Complete Picture: The Very Best of Deborah Harry and Blondie.
- The other, which came out in 1981, did not feature any of the band. It depicted a New York City taxi driver (who had appeared in several other Blondie music videos) driving his Checker Taxi through Manhattan traffic. This version was part of The Best of Blondie compilation video in 1981.

== Charts ==
=== Weekly charts ===
Chart (1980)	Peak position
Australia (Kent Music Report)	4
Austria (Ö3 Austria Top 40)	5
Belgium (Ultratop 50 Flanders)	9
Canada (RPM 100 Singles)	1
Finland (Suomen virallinen lista)	3
Ireland (IRMA)	2
Italy (FIMI)	11
Japan (Oricon)	12
Luxembourg (Radio Luxembourg)	1
Netherlands (Dutch Top 40)	9
Netherlands (Single Top 100)	12
New Zealand (Recorded Music NZ)	6
Norway (VG-lista)	2
South Africa (Springbok Radio)	2
Sweden (Sverigetopplistan)	3
Switzerland (Schweizer Hitparade)	3
UK Singles (Official Charts)	1
US Billboard Hot 100	1
US Billboard Hot Dance Club Play	2
US Record World Singles	1
West Germany (GfK)	14

=== Year-end charts ===
Chart (1980)	Rank
Australia (Kent Music Report)	19
Belgium (Ultratop Flanders)	73
Canada (RPM 100 Singles)	3
Italy (FIMI)	52
Switzerland (Schweizer Hitparade)	9
US Billboard Hot 100	1
West Germany (Official German Charts)	42

=== End-of-decade charts ===
End of decade (1980–89)	Rank
US Billboard Hot 100	9

=== All-time charts ===
Chart (1958-2018)	Position
US Billboard Hot 100	57

=== 1988 Remix ===
Chart (1989)	Peak position
UK Singles Chart	61

== Sales and certifications ==
Region	Certification	Certified units/sales
Canada (Music Canada)	Platinum	150,000^{^}
Italy (FIMI)	Gold	25,000^{‡}
New Zealand (RMNZ)	2× Platinum	60,000^{‡}
Spain (Promusicae)	Gold	30,000^{‡}
United Kingdom (BPI)	Platinum	600,000^{‡}
United States (RIAA)	Gold	1,000,000^{^}
^{^} Shipments figures based on certification alone.^{‡} Sales+streaming figures based on certification alone.

== Release history ==
=== 1980 release ===
US, UK 7" (CHS 2414)

1. "Call Me (Theme from American Gigolo)" (7" edit) — 3:32
2. "Call Me" (7" instrumental) — 3:27

UK 12" (CHS 12 2414)

1. "Call Me" (7" edit) — 3:32
2. "Call Me" (Spanish version – 7" edit) — 3:32
3. "Call Me" (7" instrumental) — 3:27

US 12" (Polydor PRO 124) [promo only]

1. "Call Me" (Theme from American Gigolo) — 8:04
2. "Night Drive" (Reprise) - by Giorgio Moroder — 3:52

US 12" (Salsoul SG 341)

1. "Call Me" (Spanish version, extended) — 6:23
2. "Call Me" (Instrumental) — 6:10

=== 1989 release ===
UK 7" (CHS 3342-1)

1. "Call Me" (Ben Liebrand Remix edit) — 3:48
2. "Call Me" (Original Version) — 3:31

UK 12" (CHS 12 3342)

1. "Call Me" (Ben Liebrand Remix) — 7:09
2. "Backfired" (Bruce Forrest And Frank Heller Remix) — 6:03
3. "Call Me" (Original Version) — 3:31

UK CD (CHSCD 3342)

1. "Call Me" (Ben Liebrand Remix) — 7:09
2. "Backfired" (Bruce Forrest And Frank Heller Remix) — 6:03
  - Performed by Debbie Harry
3. "Call Me" (Original Version) — 3:31
4. "Hanging on the Telephone" — 2:23

== Notable samples & covers ==
- A version of this song appeared on the 1980 album Chipmunk Punk by the Chipmunks.
- In 1996, Australian heavy metal band Dungeon released a cover of the song on their first album Demolition. The song was re-recorded for the band's Japan tour CD Rising Power in 2003.
- In 2022, electronic dance music producers Gabry Ponte, R3hab and Timmy Trumpet released a cover of the song. It peaked at No. 80 on the Dutch Single Top 100.
- In September 2023, U2's single Atomic City credited Harry/Moroder as co writers on the track given the clear inspiration of Call Me.
- In June 2024, German europop group Cascada released a cover of the song as the second single from their 5th studio album Studio 24.
- The song was heard in the first trailer for the 2026 superhero film Supergirl.

== See also ==
- List of Billboard Hot 100 number-one singles of 1980
