= Mother (Blondie song) =

Single by Blondie

from the album Panic of Girls
- Released: May 23, 2011
- Recorded: 2010
- Genre: New wave, pop rock
- Length: 3:09
- Label: Eleven Seven
- Songwriter(s): Deborah Harry; Kato Khandwala; Ben Phillips

Blondie singles chronology
"Good Boys" (2003)	"Mother" (2011)	"What I Heard" (2011)

Music video
- "Mother" on YouTube

"Mother" is the lead single from Blondie's ninth studio album Panic of Girls and was written by Kato Khandwala, Ben Phillips (guitarist for The Pretty Reckless) and the band's lead singer Deborah Harry. It was released in the United Kingdom on May 22, 2011, on all major online platforms. It was the first single release from the band since "Good Boys" in 2003.

== Background ==
The song was first performed in 2010 along with several other tracks from Panic of Girls during the band's Australian tour, as well as during festival appearances in the UK. It was subsequently included in the setlist of the Panic of Girls Tour in 2011 and the band's 2012 co-headlining tour with Elvis Costello. The song has been rarely performed since then but was added back into the setlist for Blondie's 2022 Against the Odds UK Tour.

== Release ==
On December 5, 2010, "Mother" was made available as a free download from the official Blondie website. The track was later remixed with a different vocal take for the album and single release. The track was played for the first time on March 17, 2011, on BBC Radio 2's The Ken Bruce Show. On Amazon.co.uk an explicit version was released alongside the regular one.

== Artwork ==
The cover artwork for "Mother" was revealed on May 5, 2011. It displays a band picture digitally manipulated to resemble a Chris Berens painting, like the artwork for its parent album. Elements of the Panic of Girls cover art are used. Also the text is inspired by the original writing by Berens.

== Music video ==
The official music video was directed by Laurent Rejto and features cameos by Kate Pierson from The B-52's, James Lorinz (Frankenhooker), Johnny Dynell, Chi Chi Valenti, The Dazzle Dancers, Rob Roth, Barbara Sicuranza, Larry Fessenden, Allen Midgette (Andy Warhol's double), The Five Points Band, Guy Furrow, Kitty Boots, and Hattie Hathaway. It was released on May 17, 2011, on the YouTube channel of Blondie's record label, Five Seven Music.

=== Synopsis ===
The video starts with a queue of people waiting to enter the nightclub (called 'Mother') where Blondie are performing. The loudness of the song causes zombies below the club to wake and, as the song progresses, they make their way up to the dancefloor. They start to turn the clubbers into zombies until everyone in the club has been turned. The video ends with Blondie themselves being turned. The video was shot in Kingston, New York.

== Track listings ==
Digital download
No.	Title	Length
1.	"Mother"	3:09

Digital download
No.	Title	Length
1.	"Mother (Explicit)"	3:09

Promo CD single
No.	Title	Length
1.	"Mother"	3:09
2.	"Mother" (Instrumental)	3:17

== Charts ==
Chart (2011)	Peak position
UK Indie (OCC)	30
