= Live by Request (Blondie album) =

- Standard artwork

Live album by Blondie
- Released: September 14, 2004 (US); October 3, 2005 (Internationally)
- Recorded: May 7, 2004, New York City, New York
- Genres: New wave, punk rock, rock
- Length: 1:02:42
- Labels: Sanctuary Records (US); Cooking Vinyl (Internationally)

Blondie chronology
The Curse of Blondie (2003)	Live by Request (2004)	Greatest Hits (2005)

Professional ratings
Review scores
Source	Rating
Allmusic	link
Encyclopedia of Popular Music	2/5 stars

Live by Request is a live and video album by the band Blondie released in the US in 2004, and internationally in 2005.

== Background ==
Following the US release of The Curse of Blondie the band performed on the A&E Network's Live by Request program on May 7, 2004 in New York City, taking requests via e-mail and phone from fans – and personal friends including film director John Waters.

This is the first Blondie release without original keyboardist Jimmy Destri who had been replaced by Kevin Topping after the work on The Curse of Blondie. This is the band's first and only release with Topping.

The album is notable for the band performing additional codas after the end of several songs, particularly after "Hanging on the Telephone", "Rip Her to Shreds", "One Way or Another", "Rapture", "Call Me" and "Union City Blue".

== Release ==
The CD and DVD editions of the album feature a different track listing as well as different bonus tracks not aired in the original broadcast. The Japanese version of the audio CD includes all seventeen tracks from the DVD version.

The album was reissued in 2008 by Warner Music as a combined CD+DVD package, however the CD featured a different running order.

== Track listing ==
CD

1. "Dreaming" (Debbie Harry, Chris Stein) – 3:27
2. "Hanging on the Telephone" (Jack Lee) – 2:54
3. "Accidents Never Happen" (Jimmy Destri) – 4:25
4. "The Tide Is High" (John Holt, Tyrone Evans, Howard Barrett) – 4:27
5. "Good Boys" (Kevin Griffin, Harry, Brian May) – 4:16
6. "Rip Her to Shreds" (Harry, Stein) – 4:19
7. "One Way or Another" (Harry, Nigel Harrison) – 5:09
8. "Rapture" (Harry, Stein) – 8:23
9. "X Offender" (Harry, Gary Valentine) – 3:41
10. "Call Me" (Giorgio Moroder, Harry) – 4:57
11. "Union City Blue" (Harry, Harrison) – 4:06
12. "Heart of Glass" (Harry, Stein) – 5:59
13. "The Dream's Lost on Me" (Acoustic) (Harry, Romy Ashby, Stein) – 3:38
14. "(I'm Always Touched by Your) Presence, Dear" (Valentine) – 3:01

Bonus tracks on Japanese edition

15. "Undone" (Harry, Craig Bartock, John Vitale) – 4:34
16. "End to End" (Harry, Ashby, Stein) – 3:58
17. "Hello Joe" (Harry, Ashby, Stein) – 4:08
- Tracks 13 and 14 (also 15 to 17 on the Japanese edition) are labeled as "Bonus Tracks (Not Aired In The Original Broadcast)"

DVD

1. "Dreaming"
2. "Hanging On The Telephone"
3. "Accidents Never Happen"
4. "The Tide Is High"
5. "Good Boys"
6. "Undone"
7. "Rip Her To Shreds"
8. "One Way Or Another"
9. "Rapture"
10. "X Offender"
11. "Call Me"
12. "Union City Blue"
13. "Heart Of Glass"

Bonus Tracks (Not Aired In The Original Broadcast)

1. "The Dream's Lost On Me"
2. "End To End"
3. "Hello Joe"
4. "(I'm Always Touched By Your) Presence, Dear"

Bonus Features

1. Photo gallery
2. "Good Boys" music video

== Personnel ==
- Deborah Harry – vocals
- Chris Stein – guitar
- Clem Burke – drums
- Paul Carbonara – guitar
- Leigh Foxx – bass guitar
- Kevin Topping – keyboards
- Steve Thompson – audio producer
