= Panic of Girls =

Studio album by Blondie
- Released: May 30, 2011
- Recorded: October–December 2009 and May 2010
- Studios: Woodstock, New York and Hoboken, New Jersey
- Genres: Alternative rock; new wave; post-punk revival
- Length: 42:33
- Labels: Five Seven; EMI
- Producers: Jeff Saltzman; Kato Khandwala

Blondie chronology
Greatest Hits (2005)	Panic of Girls (2011)	Blondie 4(0) Ever (2014)

Alternative cover
- Alternative artwork

Singles from Panic of Girls
- 1. "Mother" Released: May 23, 2011; 2. "What I Heard" Released: August 5, 2011

Professional ratings
Aggregate scores
Source	Rating
Metacritic	57/100
Review scores
Source	Rating
AllMusic	3.5/5 stars
Blurt	8/10
Drowned in Sound	4/10
Mojo	3/5 stars
NME	6/10
Paste	8.0/10
PopMatters	6/10
Rolling Stone	3/5 stars
Uncut	2/5 stars
Under the Radar	3/10

Panic of Girls is the ninth studio album by the American rock band Blondie. It was the band's first album of new material in eight years, following 2003's The Curse of Blondie. The album was first released digitally on May 30, 2011, followed by physical releases in various formats later.

== Background ==
Panic of Girls was recorded between October and December 2009 in Woodstock, New York, and May 2010 in Hoboken, New Jersey, being the second album in the band's history to be recorded outside of Manhattan, after 1980's Autoamerican (which was recorded in Los Angeles). This is the first Blondie album that does not feature original keyboardist Jimmy Destri. According to Clem Burke, the band's drummer, Destri had planned to contribute to the writing and recording of the album, but was ultimately not a part of it. Paul Carbonara, who was with Blondie since 1998, departed the band partway through the recording sessions, and was replaced by Tommy Kessler. Both of them, along with Leigh Foxx and Matt Katz-Bohen, are credited as full band members on the released album.

The album name came from the lyrics of a track recorded for the album, "End of the World", which ultimately did not appear on its final track list (though was included as a bonus track on the German deluxe edition). Panic contains one song in French ("Le Bleu") and two in Spanish ("Wipe Off My Sweat" and "Mirame", though the latter appears only on Collectors Pack version of the album) and features many rhythms and musical styles.

Clem Burke also said that about 35 songs were recorded during the sessions for the album, with only 14-16 planned to make the album (finally cut to 11). Many of these tracks were released before and after the album: "We Three Kings" (2010), "Don't Stop" (Michael Jackson's "Don't Stop Til You Get Enough", released only as a video), "Horizontal Twist", "Mirame" (Grupo Pesadilla cover), "Please Please Me" (The Beatles cover), "End of the World", "Sleeping Giant" (bonuses to different releases, 2011), "Restless" (published on a Deborah Harry forum with special permissions, 2012), "Dead Air", "Rock On" (David Essex's cover), "Bride of Infinity", "Practice Makes Perfect" (free tracks, 2012). There are also alternate mixes of "Mother" and "What I Heard", the former published on the band's site in Christmas 2010 and the latter on the song's promo CD single.

== Promotion and release ==
Two tracks from the album, "What I Heard" and "Girlie Girlie", were included on a special release of the band's 1978 album Parallel Lines that came free with the British newspaper The Mail on Sunday on December 5, 2010. Another song, "Mother", was made available as a free download from the band's website. A second, final version of the song was later announced as the lead single, available for purchase on May 23, 2011. A third single, "China Shoes", was announced on early press releases, but never materialized.

Collector's Pack

The album was originally due for release in 2010, but difficulties with record companies delayed the release. In an interview with the British newspaper The Daily Telegraph on March 24, 2011, Debbie Harry revealed that the band would be releasing the album themselves (i.e., without a record company) in the United Kingdom as part of a special "Collector's Pack" in conjunction with Future Publishing. The pack includes the album, a special 132-page magazine charting the making of the album and the band's history, as well as many archive photographs, four postcards, six badges, and a poster. It was made available in the UK from 1 June 2011 in over 3000 nontraditional music retail outlets including Tesco, Asda, Waitrose, WHSmith, and Sainsbury's. The album, by itself, was released on July 4, 2011, and was released in the United States on September 13, 2011, exclusively through Amazon.com.

The tour in support of the album kicked off in summer 2011, with dates in Europe and North America.

== Track listing ==
No.	Title	Writer(s)	Length
1.	"D-Day"	Deborah Harry / Barbara Jean Morrison / Charles W. Nieland	3:37
2.	"What I Heard"	Matt Katz-Bohen / Laurel Katz-Bohen	3:15
3.	"Mother"	Harry / Kato Khandwala / Ben Phillips	3:09
4.	"The End the End"	Harry / Khandwala / Phillips	3:41
5.	"Girlie Girlie" (Sophia George cover)	Anthony Davis / Lloyd Douglas / Steve Golding	3:25
6.	"Love Doesn't Frighten Me"	M. Katz-Bohen / L. Katz-Bohen	3:18
7.	"Words in My Mouth"	Harry / Morrison / Nieland	4:19
8.	"Sunday Smile" (Beirut cover)	Zach Condon	4:48
9.	"Wipe Off My Sweat"	Harry / Chris Stein / M. Katz-Bohen	4:13
10.	"Le Bleu"	Stein / Gilles Riberolles	4:28
11.	"China Shoes"	Harry / Stein	4:21

Collector's Pack bonus tracks
No.	Title	Writer(s)	Length
12.	"Horizontal Twist"	Harry / Stein / Morrison / Nieland	2:28
13.	"Mirame" (Grupo Pesadilla cover)	Grupo Pesadilla	3:48

Deluxe edition bonus tracks
No.	Title	Writer(s)	Length
12.	"End of the World"	Harry / Stein	5:48
13.	"Sleeping Giant"	Harry / Stein	3:37

Deluxe edition bonus disc
No.	Title	Length
1.	"Mother" (Music video)
2.	"Photo Gallery"

Japanese bonus track
No.	Title	Writer(s)	Length
12.	"Please Please Me" (The Beatles cover)	John Lennon / Paul McCartney	2:00

== Personnel ==
Blondie

- Debbie Harry – vocals
- Chris Stein – guitar
- Clem Burke – drums
- Leigh Foxx – bass guitar
- Matt Katz-Bohen – keyboards, programming, guitar on "What I Heard"
- Tommy Kessler – guitar on "Mother" and "The End the End"
- Paul Carbonara – guitar

Additional personnel

- Elliot Easton – guitar on "Love Doesn't Frighten Me"
- Zach Condon – trumpet on "Sunday Smile", "Wipe Off My Sweat" and "Le Bleu"
- Lauren Katz-Bohen – backing vocals on "Love Doesn't Frighten Me"
- Professor Louie – accordion on "Le Bleu"
- Jeff Saltzman – production (Tracks 1–2, 5–13)
- Kato Khandwala – production, engineering, programming, guitar and keyboards (Tracks 3–4)
- Super Buddha – additional production on "D-Day"
- Matt Katz-Bohen – additional production on "What I Heard"
- Chris Berens – cover art, art direction
- Marco Martin – engineer (Tracks 1–2, 5–13)
- Gabriel Espinosa – engineer (Tracks 1–2, 5–13)
- Mark Needham – mixing
- Will Brierre – assistant mix engineer
- Stephen Marcussen – mastering

== Charts ==
Chart performance for Panic of Girls
Chart (2011)	Peak position
Belgian Heatseekers Albums (Ultratop Flanders)	4
Belgian Heatseekers Albums (Ultratop Wallonia)	4
Dutch Albums (Album Top 100)	62
Scottish Albums (Official Charts)	67
UK Albums (Official Charts)	73
UK Independent Albums (Official Charts)	12

== Release history ==
Release history for Panic of Girls
Region	Date	Label	Format	Edition	Catalogue
United Kingdom	May 30, 2011	Five Seven	Digital download	Standard	
United Kingdom	June 1, 2011	Future Publishing	CD	Collector's Pack	CRP05/06/11
United Kingdom	July 4, 2011	Five Seven, EMI	CD, LP	Standard	NBL891, NBL892
Europe	July 15, 2011	Five Seven	CD, digital download	Standard	NBL891
Europe	July 15, 2011	Five Seven	2CD	Deluxe	NBL894
United States	September 13, 2011	Five Seven	CD, digital download	Standard	NBL890
Japan	October 5, 2011	Five Seven, Universal Music Japan	CD	Japanese	UICE-1195
