= Parallel Lines =

Studio album by Blondie
- Released: September 8, 1978
- Recorded: June–July 1978
- Studio: Record Plant (New York City)
- Genres: New wave; punk rock; pop rock; power pop
- Length: 39:06
- Label: Chrysalis
- Producer: Mike Chapman

Blondie chronology
Plastic Letters (1978)	Parallel Lines (1978)	Eat to the Beat (1979)

Singles from Parallel Lines
- 1. "Picture This" Released: August 1978; 2. "I'm Gonna Love You Too" Released: September 1978; 3. "Hanging on the Telephone" Released: November 1978; 4. "Heart of Glass" Released: January 1979; 5. "Sunday Girl" Released: May 1979 (UK); 6. "One Way or Another" Released: May 1979 (US)

Parallel Lines is the third studio album by American rock band Blondie, released on September 8, 1978, by Chrysalis Records. An instant critical and commercial success, the album reached No. 1 on the UK Albums Chart in February 1979 and proved to be the band's commercial breakthrough in the United States, where it reached No. 6 on the Billboard 200 in April 1979. In Billboard magazine, Parallel Lines was listed at No. 9 in its top pop albums year-end chart of 1979. The album spawned several successful singles, notably the international hit "Heart of Glass".

== Background ==
"Musically, Blondie were hopelessly horrible when we first began rehearsing for Parallel Lines, and in terms of my attitude they didn't know what had hit them. I basically went in there like Adolf Hitler and said, 'You are going to make a great record, and that means you're going to start playing better.'"

— Mike Chapman, in an interview for Sound on Sound, recalling Blondie's initial musical inexperience

Blondie's second studio album, Plastic Letters (1977), was their last album produced by Richard Gottehrer, whose sound had formed the basis of Blondie's new wave and punk output. During a tour of the west coast of the US in support of Plastic Letters, Blondie encountered Australian producer Mike Chapman in California. Peter Leeds, Blondie's manager, conspired with Chrysalis Records to encourage Chapman to work with Blondie on new music. Drummer Clem Burke recalls feeling enthusiastic about the proposition, believing Chapman could create innovative and eclectic records. However, lead vocalist Debbie Harry was far less enthusiastic about Chapman's involvement as she knew him only by reputation; according to Chapman, her animosity towards him was because "they were New York. [He] was L.A.". Harry's cautiousness abated after she played Chapman early cuts of "Heart of Glass" and "Sunday Girl" and he was impressed.

== Recording ==
In June 1978 the band entered the Record Plant in New York to record their third album, and first with Chapman. However, Chapman found the band difficult to work with, remembering them as the worst band he ever worked with in terms of musical ability, although praising Frank Infante as "an amazing guitarist". Sessions with Chris Stein were hampered by his being stoned during recording, and Chapman encouraged him to write songs rather than play guitar. Similarly, according to Chapman, Jimmy Destri would prove himself to be far better at songwriting than as a keyboardist, and Clem Burke had poor timing playing drums. As a result, Chapman spent time improving the band, especially Stein with whom Chapman spent hours rerecording his parts to ensure they were right. Bassist Nigel Harrison became so frustrated with Chapman's drive for perfection that he threw a synthesizer at him during recording. Chapman recalls the atmosphere at the Record Plant in an interview for Sound on Sound:

The Blondies were tough in the studio, real tough. None of them liked each other, except Chris and Debbie, and there was so much animosity. They were really, really juvenile in their approach to life—a classic New York underground rock band—and they didn't give a fuck about anything. They just wanted to have fun and didn't want to work too hard getting it.

Chapman took an unorthodox approach when recording with Harry whom he describes as "a great singer and a great vocal stylist, with a beautifully identifiable voice. However ... also very moody". Chapman was far more cautious of demanding much from Harry as he saw her as a highly emotional person who would vest these emotions in the songs they made. He remembers Harry disappearing into the bathroom in tears for several hours at a time during recording. During a day of recording, Harry sang two lead parts and some harmonies, less work than she did previously with Gottehrer. This was due to Chapman encouraging her to be cautious about the way she sang, particularly to recognise phrasing, timing and attitude.

Blondie recorded Parallel Lines in six weeks, despite being given six months by Terry Ellis, co-founder of Chrysalis Records, to do so. For the drums, a traditional set-up was used and Chapman fitted Neumann microphones to the toms, snare and hi-hat, as well as several above the site. When recording, Chapman would start with the bass track, which was difficult to record at the time, by way of "pencil erasing". Chapman explained in an interview for Sound on Sound, "that meant using a pencil to hold the tape away from the head and erasing up to the kick drum. If a bass part was ahead of the kick, you could erase it so that it sounded like it was on top of the kick. That's very easy to do these days, but back then it was quite a procedure just to get the bottom end sounding nice and tight." A combination DI/amp method was used to record Harrison's bass and Destri's synthesizer. Shure SM57 and AKG 414 microphones were used to capture Infante's Les Paul guitar. King Crimson leader Robert Fripp makes a guest appearance on guitar on "Fade Away and Radiate".

After the basic track was complete, Chapman would record lead and backing vocals with Harry. However, this process was hampered by many songs not being written in time for the vocals to be recorded. "Sunday Girl", "Picture This" and "One Way Or Another" were all unfinished during the rehearsal sessions. When recording vocal parts, Chapman remembers asking Harry if she was ready to sing, only for her to reply "Yeah, just a minute" as she was still writing lyrics down. Chapman notes that many "classic" songs from the album were created this way.

During the last session at the Record Plant, the band were asleep on the floor only to be awakened at six o'clock in the morning by Mike Chapman and his engineer Peter Coleman leaving for Los Angeles with the tape tracks. Despite Blondie's belief that Parallel Lines would resonate with a wider audience, Chrysalis Records was not as enthusiastic; label executives told them to start again, only to be dissuaded by Chapman's assurance that its singles would prove popular.

== Music and lyrics ==
According to music journalist Robert Christgau, Parallel Lines was a pop rock album in which Blondie achieved their "synthesis of the Dixie Cups and the Electric Prunes". Its style of "state-of-the-art pop/rock circa 1978", as AllMusic's William Ruhlmann described it, showed Blondie deviating from new wave and emerging as "a pure pop band". Ken Tucker believed the band had eschewed the "brooding artiness" of their previous albums for more hooks and pop-oriented songs. Chapman later said, "I didn't make a punk album or a New Wave album with Blondie. I made a pop album." The album's eleven pop songs have refined melodics, and its sole disco song, "Heart of Glass", features jittery keyboards, rustling cymbals by drummer Clem Burke, and a circular rhythm. Burke credited Kraftwerk and the soundtrack to the 1977 film Saturday Night Fever as influences for the song and said that he was "trying to get that groove that the drummer for the Bee Gees had".

Lyrically, Parallel Lines abandoned what Rolling Stone magazine's Arion Berger called the "cartoonish postmodernist referencing" of Blondie's previous new wave songs in favor of a "romantic fatalism" that was new for the band. "Sunday Girl" deals with the theme of teen loneliness. Music critic Rob Sheffield said that the lyric "dusty frames that still arrive / die in 1955", in "Fade Away and Radiate", is the "best lyric in any rock'n'roll song, ever, and it's still the ultimate statement of a band that always found some pleasure worth exploiting in the flashy and the temporary."

== Title and packaging ==
Parallel Lines took its name from an unused track written by Harry, the lyrics of which were included in the first vinyl edition of the album. The cover sleeve image was photographed by Edo Bertoglio and was chosen by Blondie's manager, Peter Leeds, despite being rejected by the band. The photo shows the band in front of a background made up of alternating black and white vertical bars, with the male members of the band posing in matching dress suits and smiling broadly in contrast to Harry who poses defiantly with her hands on her hips while wearing a white dress and high heels. According to music journalist Tim Peacock, the cover became "iconic – and instantly recognisable".

== Release and promotion ==
The album was released by Chrysalis in September 1978, to international success. The album entered the Billboard 200 album chart the week ending September 23, 1978, at No. 186, reflecting retail sales during the survey period ending September 10, 1978. In the United Kingdom, it entered the albums chart at No.13, eventually reaching the no.1 spot in February 1979 after the band had scored hits with the singles "Picture This" (UK #12), "Hanging on the Telephone" (UK #5), and "Heart of Glass" (UK #1). "Sunday Girl" was released in the UK as a fourth single from the album in May 1979 and also reached no.1, and Parallel Lines became the UK's biggest selling album of the year. Blondie embarked on a sold-out tour of the UK and appeared at an autograph signing event for Our Price Records on Kensington High Street; according to Peacock, it "descended into Beatlemania-esque chaos when the band were mobbed by thousands of fans".

Parallel Lines was also a commercial success elsewhere in Europe, Australia, and the United States, where the band had struggled to sell their previous records. "Heart of Glass" became their first number-one hit on the American Billboard Hot 100, with help from a promotional video directed by Stanley Dorfman depicting Blondie in a performance of the song at a fashionable nightclub in New York. The single was "responsible for turning the band into bona fide superstars", Peacock said.

== Critical reception ==
Retrospective professional ratings
Review scores
Source	Rating
AllMusic	5/5 stars
Blender	5/5 stars
Christgau's Record Guide	A
Encyclopedia of Popular Music	4/5 stars
Entertainment Weekly	B
Pitchfork	9.7/10
Q	4/5 stars
Rolling Stone	4.5/5 stars
The Rolling Stone Album Guide	4.5/5 stars
Slant Magazine	4.5/5 stars
Spin Alternative Record Guide	10/10

The album was met with universal acclaim from critics. Writing in The Village Voice in 1978, Robert Christgau said although Blondie still could not write a perfect hit single, the record was a consistent improvement over Plastic Letters. Years later, he wrote in Blender that it was "a perfect album in 1978" and remained so with "every song memorable, distinct, well-shaped and over before you get antsy. Never again did singer Deborah Harry, mastermind Chris Stein and their able four-man cohort nail the band's signature paradoxes with such unfailing flair: lowbrow class, tender sarcasm, pop rock." New York Times critic John Rockwell named Parallel Lines the eighth best album of 1978. Daryl Easlea from BBC Music, who felt the record combined power pop and new wave styles, credited Mike Chapman's production and flair for pop songwriting for helping make Parallel Lines an extremely popular album in the United Kingdom, where it was a number-one hit and charted for 106 weeks during the late 1970s. Q magazine called the album "a crossover smash with sparkling guitar sounds, terrific hooks and middle-eights more memorable than some groups' choruses." Clem Burke included Parallel Lines in the list of his favorite punk albums.

=== Accolades ===
In 2024, Parallel Lines was selected for preservation in the National Recording Registry by the Library of Congress as being "culturally, historically, or aesthetically significant".

== Legacy ==
In a retrospective appraisal of 1970s post-punk albums, Spin magazine's Sasha Frere-Jones said Parallel Lines may have been "the perfect pop-rock record" and Blondie's best album. Christian John Wikane from PopMatters later called it "a creative and commercial masterpiece by Blondie ... indisputably one of the great, classic albums of the rock and roll era." In the opinion of Pitchfork critic Scott Plagenhoef, the album popularized "the look and sound of 1980s new wave" with classic songs that showcased the depth and complexity of Harry's sexuality and singing. Sal Cinquemani from Slant Magazine was also impressed by her singing, which he felt varied from "purring like a kitten and then building to a mean growl", and cited "Heart of Glass" as the album's best track because of her "honey-dipped vocal".

In 2000, Parallel Lines was voted number 57 in Colin Larkin's book All Time Top 1000 Albums. Three years later, it was ranked at number 140 on Rolling Stone's list of the 500 greatest albums of all time, maintaining the rating in a 2012 revised list, and moved slightly down to number 146 in the 2020 revision; an accompanying essay said the album was "where punk and New Wave broke through to a mass U.S. audience". It has also been placed at number 18 and 45 on NME's 100 Best Albums of All Time (2003) and 500 Greatest Albums of All Time (2013) lists, respectively; number 7 on Blender's 100 Greatest American Albums of All Time; number 94 on Channel 4's 2005 list of the 100 greatest albums of all time; and number 76 on Pitchfork's list of the best albums from the 1970s. Slant Magazine included it on their 2003 list of 50 Essential Vital Pop Albums.

== Reissues ==
The album was reissued and remastered in 2001 along with Blondie's back catalog, and featured four bonus tracks: a 1978 version of "Once I Had a Love", a live cover of T. Rex's song "Bang a Gong (Get It On)", and two live tracks taken from the Picture This Live live album.

On June 24, 2008, an expanded 30th Anniversary Edition of the album was released, which featured new artwork and bonus tracks along with bonus DVD. The liner notes once again featured lyrics to the unfinished "Parallel Lines" song. The Parallel Lines 30th Anniversary Edition included the 7″ single version of "Heart of Glass", the French version of "Sunday Girl" and some remixes, plus a DVD with albums, promo videos and TV performance.

The band also launched a world tour of the same name in 2008 to promote the re-release and celebrate the event.

== Track listing ==
Side one
No.	Title	Writer(s)	Length
1.	"Hanging on the Telephone" (The Nerves cover)	Jack Lee	2:17
2.	"One Way or Another"	Deborah Harry; Nigel Harrison	3:31
3.	"Picture This"	Harry; Chris Stein; Jimmy Destri	2:53
4.	"Fade Away and Radiate"	Stein	3:57
5.	"Pretty Baby"	Harry; Stein	3:16
6.	"I Know but I Don't Know"	Frank Infante	3:53

Side two
No.	Title	Writer(s)	Length
7.	"11:59"	Destri	3:19
8.	"Will Anything Happen?"	Lee	2:55
9.	"Sunday Girl"	Stein	3:01
10.	"Heart of Glass"	Harry; Stein	3:54
11.	"I'm Gonna Love You Too" (Buddy Holly cover)	Joe B. Mauldin; Niki Sullivan; Norman Petty	2:03
12.	"Just Go Away"	Harry	3:21

2001 remastered reissue bonus tracks
No.	Title	Writer(s)	Length
13.	"Once I Had a Love (The Disco Song)" (1978 version) (recorded June 3, 1978, at The Record Plant, NYC)	Harry; Stein	3:18
14.	"Bang a Gong (Get It On)" (recorded live November 4, 1978, at The Paradise in Boston, MA)	Marc Bolan	5:30
15.	"I Know But I Don't Know" (recorded live November 6, 1978, at the Walnut Theatre in Philadelphia, Pennsylvania)	Infante	4:35
16.	"Hanging on the Telephone" (recorded live 1980 in Dallas, Texas)	Lee	2:21

2008 deluxe collector's edition bonus tracks
No.	Title	Length
13.	"Heart of Glass" (7″ single version)	4:10
14.	"Sunday Girl" (French version) (from "Sunday Girl" 12″ single)	3:04
15.	"Hanging on the Telephone" (Nosebleed Handbag Remix) (from Beautiful: The Remix Album)	6:14
16.	"Fade Away and Radiate" (108 BPM Remix) (from Beautiful: The Remix Album)	5:16

2008 deluxe collector's edition bonus DVD
No.	Title	Length
1.	"Heart of Glass"
2.	"Hanging on the Telephone"
3.	"Picture This"
4.	"Sunday Girl" (live on Top of the Pops)

2010 Mail on Sunday promo bonus tracks
No.	Title	Writer(s)	Length
13.	"What I Heard"	Matt Katz-Bohen; Laurel Katz-Bohen	3:15
14.	"Girlie Girlie" (Sophia George cover)	Anthony Davis; Lloyd Douglas; Steve Golding	3:25

=== Notes ===
- The album version of "Heart of Glass" was replaced with the disco version (5:50 long) on pressings of the album from March 1979 onward. The original length version of "Heart of Glass" appeared on the original US CD release in 1985 (Chrysalis VK 41192, later F2 21192) although the CD artwork proclaimed it was the disco version. Later editions of the Capitol disc had the mistake removed from the inlay but it remained on the disc until its deletion. The 1994 DCC Compact Classics Gold CD release (Capitol Special Markets USA GSZ 1062) features the original version with the disco version as a bonus track.
- A promotional CD of the album was given away free with the British newspaper The Mail on Sunday on December 5, 2010, including the bonus tracks "What I Heard" and "Girlie Girlie" from the band's 2011 album Panic of Girls.

== Personnel ==
Credits adapted from the liner notes of Parallel Lines.

=== Blondie ===
- Jimmy Destri – electronic keyboards
- Frank Infante – guitar, co-lead vocals on "I Know but I Don't Know"
- Chris Stein – guitar, 12-string, E-bow
- Nigel Harrison – bass
- Clem Burke – drums
- Debbie Harry – vocals

=== Additional personnel ===
- Robert Fripp – guitar on "Fade Away and Radiate"
- Mike Chapman – production, backing vocals on "Hanging on the Telephone" (Note: In the documentary Blondie's New York... and the Making of Parallel Lines (2014), Mike Chapman states his additional vocals were overdubbed to the outro of the song. He also proves this by playing the master track isolated during the interview in his studio.) and "Heart of Glass"
- Pete Coleman – production assistance, engineering
- Grey Russell – engineering assistance
- Steve Hall – mastering at MCA Whitney Studio (Glendale, California)
- Edo Bertoglio – photography
- Ramey Communications – art direction, design
- Frank Duarte – illustration
- Jerry Rodriguez – lettering
- Kevin Flaherty – production (2001 reissue)

== Charts ==
=== Weekly charts ===
1978–1979 weekly chart performance for Parallel Lines
Chart (1978–1979)	Peak position
Australian Albums (Kent Music Report)	2
Austrian Albums (Ö3 Austria)	24
Canada Top Albums/CDs (RPM)	2
Dutch Albums (Album Top 100)	7
Finnish Albums (Suomen virallinen lista)	11
German Albums (Offizielle Top 100)	9
Italian Albums (Musica e dischi)	13
New Zealand Albums (RMNZ)	3
Norwegian Albums (VG-lista)	16
Portuguese Albums (Música & Som)	7
Swedish Albums (Sverigetopplistan)	9
UK Albums (Official Charts)	1
US Billboard 200	6

2018 weekly chart performance for Parallel Lines
Chart (2018)	Peak position
Scottish Albums (Official Charts)	29
UK Physical Albums (OCC)	33
UK Vinyl Albums (OCC)	4

2023 weekly chart performance for Parallel Lines
Chart 2023	Peak position
Greek Charts Top 75 Albums Sales	10

=== Year-end charts ===
1978 year-end chart performance for Parallel Lines
Chart (1978)	Position
Dutch Albums (Album Top 100)	49
UK Albums (BMRB)	38

1979 year-end chart performance for Parallel Lines
Chart (1979)	Position
Australian Albums (Kent Music Report)	12
Canada Top Albums/CDs (RPM)	27
German Albums (Offizielle Top 100)	17
New Zealand Albums (RMNZ)	9
UK Albums (BMRB)	1
US Billboard 200	9

1980 year-end chart performance for Parallel Lines
Chart (1980)	Position
UK Albums (BMRB)	42
US Billboard 200	40

== Certifications and sales ==
Certifications and sales for Parallel Lines
Region	Certification	Certified units/sales
Australia (ARIA)	Platinum	70,000^{^}
Canada (Music Canada)	4× Platinum	400,000^{^}
Netherlands (NVPI)	Gold	50,000^{^}
New Zealand (RMNZ)	Platinum	15,000^{^}
United Kingdom (BPI)	Platinum	1,694,353
United States (RIAA)	Platinum	1,500,000
Yugoslavia	Platinum	100,000
Summaries
Worldwide	—	16,000,000
^{^} Shipments figures based on certification alone.
