= Chi Chi Valenti =

American journalist and nightlife producer

- Born: Manhattan, New York, United States
- Occupations: Journalist, nightlife producer, performance artist
- Writing career
- Pen name: "The Empress"
- Website: mothernyc.com/empress/

Chi Chi Valenti is an American journalist, nightlife producer, and performance artist.

== Career ==
Writing for Details and The Village Voice, Valenti became one of the first journalists to chronicle 1980s Ball culture in the Bronx. In 1991, Valenti and her husband Johnny Dynell created "Night of 1000 Stevies," an annual Stevie Nicks tribute which has continued for more than thirty years and featured performances by Debbie Harry, Cyndi Lauper, Boy George, Justin Bond, Sherry Vine, Taylor Mac, and Basil Twist. From 1996 to 2000, Valenti co-owned Mother, a nightclub which hosted parties such as Jackie 60 and Click + Drag, and would later be the subject of the 2011 Blondie song, "Mother". Since 2002, Valenti has produced the Howl Festival, named after the Allen Ginsberg poem and performed annually in Tompkins Square Park.
