= Jackie 60 =

New York City nightclub

Jackie 60 was a nightclub hosting weekly parties from 1990 to 1999 in New York's Meatpacking District. It was founded by DJ Johnny Dynell, writer Chi Chi Valenti, fashion designer Kitty Boots and dancer/choreographer Richard Move, who were later (ca. 1995) joined by Brian Butterick AKA Hattie Hathaway. The club served "dominant women, poets, gay men and lesbians, free-thinking heterosexuals, transvestites and transexuals, fetish-dressers, bisexuals, and those who love them." Dynell and Valenti purchased the nightclub "Bar Room 432" from Anthony DePalma in 1994 and renamed it "Mother", which operated until December 28, 1999.

== See also ==
- LGBT culture in New York City
