= Patrick Chung =

Jamaican-American gridiron football player (born 1987)

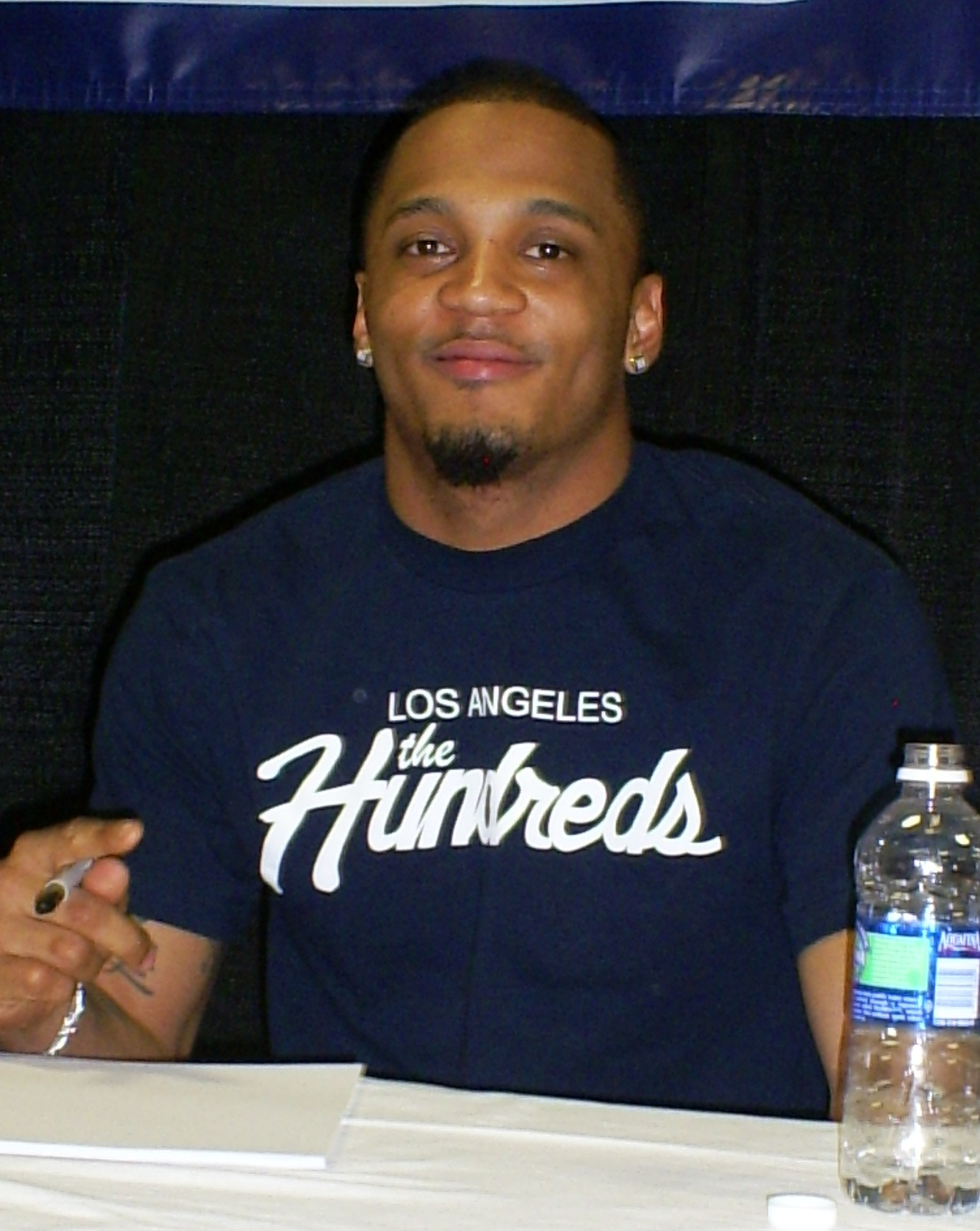
- Chung in 2012

No. 25, 23
- Position: Safety

Personal information
- Born: August 19, 1987 (age 39); Kingston, Jamaica
- Listed height: 5 ft 11 in (1.80 m)
- Listed weight: 215 lb (98 kg)

Career information
- High school: Rancho Cucamonga (Rancho Cucamonga, California, U.S.)
- College: Oregon
- NFL draft: 2009: 2nd round, 34th overall pick

Career history
- New England Patriots (2009–2012); Philadelphia Eagles (2013); New England Patriots (2014–2019)

Awards and highlights
- 3× Super Bowl champion (XLIX, LI, LIII); New England Patriots All-2010s Team; New England Patriots All-Dynasty Team; Second-team All-American (2007); First-team Freshman All-American (2005); 2× First-team All-Pac-10 (2007, 2008)

Career NFL statistics
- Total tackles: 773
- Sacks: 4.5
- Pass deflections: 56
- Interceptions: 11
- Forced fumbles: 1
- Defensive touchdowns: 1
- Stats at Pro Football Reference

Patrick Christopher Chung (born August 19, 1987) is a Jamaican-American former professional football safety who played in the National Football League (NFL) for 12 seasons, primarily with the New England Patriots. He played college football for the Oregon Ducks and was selected in the second round of the 2009 NFL draft by the Patriots, where he spent 11 non-consecutive seasons. Chung was a member of the Philadelphia Eagles for one season in 2013 in between his Patriots tenure. A three-time Super Bowl winner with New England, Chung was named to the franchise's All-2010s Team and All-Dynasty Team in 2020.

== Early life ==
Chung was born on August 19, 1987, in Kingston, Jamaica. His mother is Sophia George, who was a one-hit wonder in the UK with her 1985 hit "Girlie Girlie" that reached number one in Jamaica, topping the RJR chart for 11 weeks, and was also a Top-10 hit in the UK. At the time of recording, George worked as a teacher of hearing-impaired learners. She married her manager, Ronald Chung (Patrick's father), and they relocated to Miami in the mid-1990s and later settled in Los Angeles.

Chung lived in Jamaica until age 10 before moving to California, where he attended Rancho Cucamonga High School in Rancho Cucamonga, California. Chung played football as a safety and wide receiver and was a two-time All-League pick. He graduated high school in June 2004, two months before his 17th birthday.

== College career ==
Chung enrolled at the University of Oregon in 2004 once he turned 17 years old. After redshirting in 2004, Chung took over at the "rover" position at age 18 in 2005, ranking second on the team with 91 tackles (five solo) while also recording a forced fumble and five pass deflections. He earned All-Pacific-10 Conference honorable mention honors, and a spot on the Sporting News Freshman All-American Team.

As a sophomore in 2006, Chung once again earned All-Pac-10 honorable mention, finishing third on the team with 84 tackles, two sacks, and four interceptions.

As a junior, Chung was named Second Team All-American and first-team All-Pac-10 Conference. He earned the Gordon E. Wilson Award, given to the team's top special teams player. Chung averaged 22.3 yards on nine kickoff returns while leading the Ducks with a career-high 117 tackles (71 solos), adding 7.5 stops for loss. He broke up nine passes and was credited with a pair of interceptions.

Chung garnered Third Team All-American accolades in addition to making the All-Pac 10 first-team for the second consecutive year in 2008. Along with offensive lineman Max Unger, the pair set the school record with 51 consecutive starting assignments. Chung finished his senior season with 92 tackles (58 solos) in 13 games, coming up with two sacks among his 6.5 stops for loss to go along with a forced fumble, a fumble recovery, seven pass deflections, and a pick-six.

Chung holds the distinction of starting more games than any other defensive player in Oregon history, having started 51 straight games during his collegiate career.

== Professional career ==
=== Pre-draft ===
On January 16, 2009, it was announced that Chung had decided to forgo his last year of eligibility and enter the 2009 NFL draft. Three days later, Chung announced that he decided to instead return to Oregon for his senior year. On January 24, Chung participated in the 2009 Senior Bowl as part of Cincinnati Bengals' head coach Marvin Lewis' North team that lost 18–35 to the South. He went on to attend the NFL Scouting Combine and completed the majority of drills before sustaining a knee injury. Chung was unable to perform the short shuttle and three-cone drill due to the injury. On March 12, he attended Oregon's pro day and ran the short shuttle, three-cone drill, and positional drills. At the end of the pre-draft process, Chung was projected to be a second-round pick by NFL draft experts and scouts. He was ranked as the top strong safety prospect in the draft by DraftScout.com and was ranked the second-best safety by NFL analyst Mike Mayock.

Pre-draft measurables
Height	Weight	Arm length	Hand span	40-yard dash	10-yard split	20-yard split	20-yard shuttle	Three-cone drill	Vertical jump	Broad jump	Bench press	Wonderlic
5 ft 11 1/4 in (1.81 m)	212 lb (96 kg)	31 1/2 in (0.80 m)	9 in (0.23 m)	4.57 s	1.56 s	2.61 s	4.24 s	7.11 s	34.0 in (0.86 m)	9 ft 11 in (3.02 m)	25 reps	23
All values from NFL Combine/Oregon's Pro Day

=== New England Patriots (first stint) ===
==== 2009 season ====
The New England Patriots selected Chung in the second round (34th overall) of the 2009 NFL draft. He was the second safety drafted in 2009, one pick behind Western Michigan safety Louis Delmas. The second round pick used to select Chung was previously traded from the Kansas City Chiefs to the Patriots in exchange for Matt Cassel and Mike Vrabel. On July 27, 2009, the Patriots signed Chung to a four-year, $5 million contract with a signing bonus of $2 million.

Defensive coordinator Dean Pees held a competition to name to new starting safeties between Chung, Brandon Meriweather, James Sanders, and Brandon McGowan. Head coach Bill Belichick named Chung the backup strong safety to begin the regular season, behind Brandon Meriweather.

Chung made his NFL debut in the season-opener against the Buffalo Bills and recorded one tackle during the narrow 25–24 victory. He made his first NFL tackle with teammate Darius Butler on cornerback Leodis McKelvin during a 21-yard kick return in the fourth quarter. During Week 6 against the Tennessee Titans, Chung had a season-high eight combined tackles, a pass deflection, and his first NFL interception off a pass by quarterback Vince Young in the 59–0 shutout victory. In the next game against the Tampa Bay Buccaneers at Wembley Stadium, Chung recorded four solo tackles and made his first NFL sack on quarterback Josh Johnson during the 35–7 victory. Three weeks later against the Indianapolis Colts, Chung earned his first NFL start and recorded five combined tackles in the narrow 35–34 road loss.

Chung finished his rookie year with 37 combined tackles (25 solo), two sacks, a pass deflection, and an interception in 16 games and one start. The Patriots finished atop the AFC East with a 10–6 record. On January 10, 2010, Chung appeared in his first NFL playoff game as the Patriots were defeated 33–14 by the Baltimore Ravens during the Wild Card Round.

==== 2010 season ====
On January 15, 2010, it was reported that defensive coordinator Dean Pees would not be renewing his contract or returning to the Patriots, so head coach Bill Belichick took over defensive coordinator duties for the season. Chung competed for the job as the starting strong safety against Brandon McGowan and James Sanders. He was officially named the starting strong safety to start the regular season, along with free safety Brandon Meriweather.

Chung started in the season-opener against the Cincinnati Bengals and collected a career-high 16 combined tackles (12 solo) during the 38–24 victory. Three weeks later against the Miami Dolphinson Monday Night Football, Chung made five combined tackles and returned an interception by Chad Henne for a 51-yard touchdown to mark the first score of his career while also blocking a punt and a field goal in the 41–14 road victory.

During a Week 6 23–20 victory over the Baltimore Ravens, Chung recorded 13 combined tackles (five solo). In the next game, he had a tackle before exiting a 23–20 victory over the San Diego Chargers after injuring his knee. Chung was sidelined for the next two games (Weeks 8–9) due to the knee injury.

Chung finished his second professional season with 96 combined tackles (72 solo), nine pass deflections, three interceptions, and a touchdown in 14 games and 13 starts. The Patriots finished atop the AFC East with a 14–2 record, clinching a first-round bye and home-field advantage. On January 16, 2011, Chung made his first NFL start in a playoff game and recorded four solo tackles during a 28–21 loss to the New York Jets in the Divisional Round. With 1:14 left in the second quarter, Chung made the decision to call an audible on a punt and opted to receive a direct snap from the long snapper on a trick play instead and attempt to gain four yards for the first down. He botched the direct snap and recovered the fumble for no gain at New England's 37-yard line. The mistake proved costly as the Jets capitalized on their field position and scored a touchdown in four plays and 41 seconds to enter half time leading the Patriots 14–3. Chung accepted responsibility for the mistake and stated it was his decision to call for the direct snap. He explained that he called the audible after discovering the Patriots had an eight on six advantage with their blocking scheme.

==== 2011 season ====
Chung entered training camp slated as the starting strong safety and was officially named the starter to begin the regular season, opposite free safety Brandon Meriweather. On September 18, 2011, Chung made five combined tackles during a 35–21 victory against the San Diego Chargers in Week 2. He exited the game in the third quarter and returned with a hard cast around his thumb in the fourth quarter. Chung was inactive for the Patriots' Week 3 loss at the Buffalo Bills after undergoing surgery to repair his fractured thumb. On October 30, 2011, Chung collected a season-high 13 combined tackles (10 solo) and broke up a pass in a 25–17 road loss to the Pittsburgh Steelers in Week 8. He was sidelined for seven consecutive games (Weeks 10–16) after suffering a foot injury.

Chung finished the 2011 season with 62 combined tackles (37 solo), four pass deflections, an interception, and a sack in eight games and eight starts.

The Patriots finished atop of the AFC East with a 13–3 record, clinching a first-round bye and home-field advantage. They went on to defeat the Denver Broncos in the AFC Divisional Round and the Baltimore Ravens in the AFC Championship Game. On February 5, 2012, Chung started in Super Bowl XLVI and recorded six combined tackles and a pass deflection during the 21–17 loss to the New York Giants.

==== 2012 season ====
Defensive coordinator Matt Patricia retained Chung as the starting strong safety, alongside free safety Steve Gregory. Chung started the first six games of the season before sustaining a shoulder injury and missing four games (Weeks 7–11). During his absence, he was replaced by Devin McCourty, who was moved from cornerback to safety. Upon his return in Week 11, Chung was named the backup strong safety behind McCourty and was limited to 65 defensive snaps in the next four games (Weeks 11–14). On December 23, 2012, Chung made four combined tackles, two pass deflections, and intercepted two passes by Chad Henne during a 23–16 win at the Jacksonville Jaguars in Week 16. The following week, Chung collected a season-high six combined tackles and deflected a pass in the Patriots' 28–0 victory against the Miami Dolphins in Week 17.

Chung finished the 2012 season with 44 combined tackles (29 solo), five pass deflections, and two interceptions in 12 games and eight starts.

=== Philadelphia Eagles ===
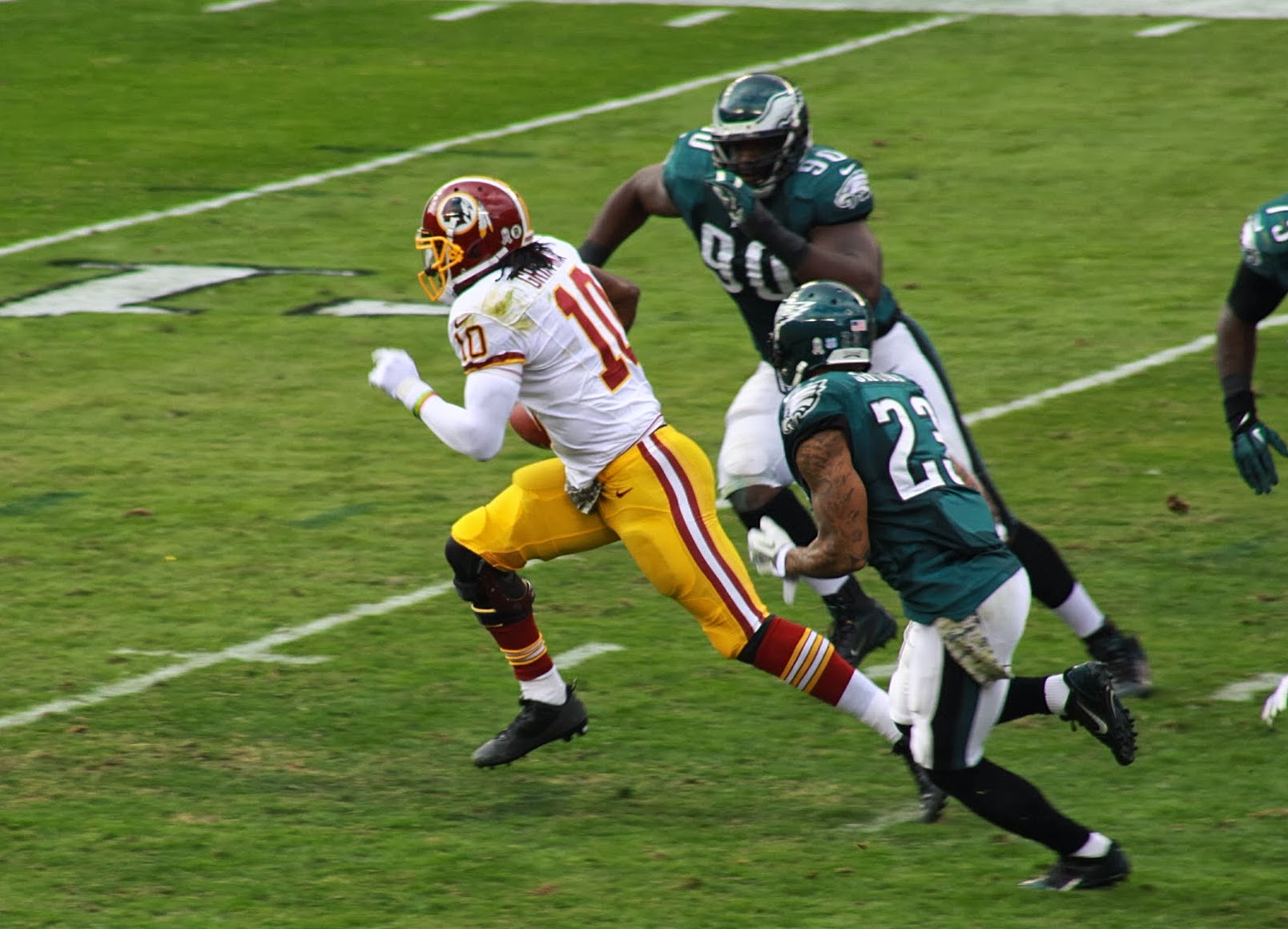
Chung (#23) in 2013

On March 12, 2013, the Philadelphia Eagles signed Chung to a three-year, $10 million contract with $4 million guaranteed. He was reunited with Eagles' head coach Chip Kelly, who served as Oregon's offensive coordinator during Chung's last two years.

Defensive coordinator Billy Davis held an open competition to name two new starting safeties. The competition included Chung, Kenny Phillips, Colt Anderson, Nate Allen, Kurt Coleman, and David Sims. Head coach Chip Kelly named him the starting free safety to begin the season, along with strong safety Nate Allen.

Chung started in the Eagles' season-opener against the Washington Redskins and recorded seven combined tackles during the 33–27 road victory. He was sidelined for two games (Weeks 4–5) due to a shoulder injury. During Week 6 against the Tampa Bay Buccaneers, Chung made two combined tackles before leaving the eventual 31–20 road victory in the third quarter after aggravating his shoulder injury. Chung missed another two games due to the injury (Weeks 7–8) and lost his starting role to rookie Earl Wolff. Chung regained his starting role in Week 11 and started the last six games of the regular season after Wolff sustained a knee injury. During the regular-season finale, Chung collected a season-high 10 combined tackles (five solo) in the narrow 24–22 road victory over the Dallas Cowboys.

Chung finished his only season with the Eagles with 59 combined tackles (39 solo) and three pass deflections in 12 games and 10 starts. The Eagles finished atop the NFC East with a 10–6 record. On January 4, 2014, Chung made four solo tackles in the narrow 26–24 loss to the New Orleans Saints during the Wild Card Round.

On March 11, 2014, the Eagles released Chung after only one season, saving $2.25 million in cap space. His release was widely attributed to his injuries and issues in pass coverage. Problems with tackling and multiple incidents of accidentally delivering hits to teammates were also cited as possible reasons for his release.

=== New England Patriots (second stint) ===
==== 2014 season ====
On April 3, 2014, the Patriots re-signed Chung to a one-year, $1.1 million contract that included $120,000 guaranteed and a signing bonus of $60,000.

Throughout training camp, Chung competed against Duron Harmon for the job as the starting strong safety after the Patriots elected not to re-sign starting strong safety Steve Gregory. Head coach Bill Belichick named Chung the starter to begin the season, alongside free safety Devin McCourty.

During a Week 13 26–21 road loss against the Green Bay Packers, Chung collected a season-high 11 combined tackles (eight solo). Two weeks later against the Miami Dolphins, he recorded 10 combined tackles (five solo), two pass deflections, and intercepted a pass by Ryan Tannehill in the 41–13 victory.

Chung finished the 2014 season with 85 combined tackles (54 solo), with pass deflections, and an interception in 16 games and 15 starts. Pro Football Focus gave him an overall grade of 84.4 in 2014. The Patriots finished atop in the AFC East with a 12–4 record, clinching a first-round bye and home-field advantage. On January 9, 2015, the Patriots signed Chung to a three-year, $8.2 million extension with $3.4 million guaranteed and a $2.4 million signing bonus. The next day, he started in the AFC Divisional Round and recorded seven combined tackles during the 35–31 victory against the Baltimore Ravens. The Patriots reached the Super Bowl after defeating the Indianapolis Colts 45–7 in the AFC Championship Game. On February 1, 2015, Chung started in Super Bowl XLIX and made a solo tackle during the 28–24 victory against the Seattle Seahawks.

==== 2015 season ====
On November 15, 2015, Chung collected a season-high 12 combined tackles (six solo) during a narrow 27–26 victory at the New York Giants in Week 10. He was inactive during the Patriots' Week 16 loss at the New York Jets after injuring his hip the previous week.

Chung finished the 2015 season with 85 combined tackles (52 solo), nine pass deflections, and a forced fumble in 15 games and 14 starts. He received an overall grade of 88.4 from Pro Football Focus, which was sixth highest grade among all qualified safeties in 2015. The Patriots finished atop the AFC East with a 12–4 record for the second consecutive season. On January 16, 2016, he made nine combined tackles during a 27–20 victory over the Kansas City Chiefs in the AFC Divisional Round. The following week, Chung collected five combined tackles in the narrow 20–18 loss at the Denver Broncos during the AFC Championship Game.

==== 2016 season ====
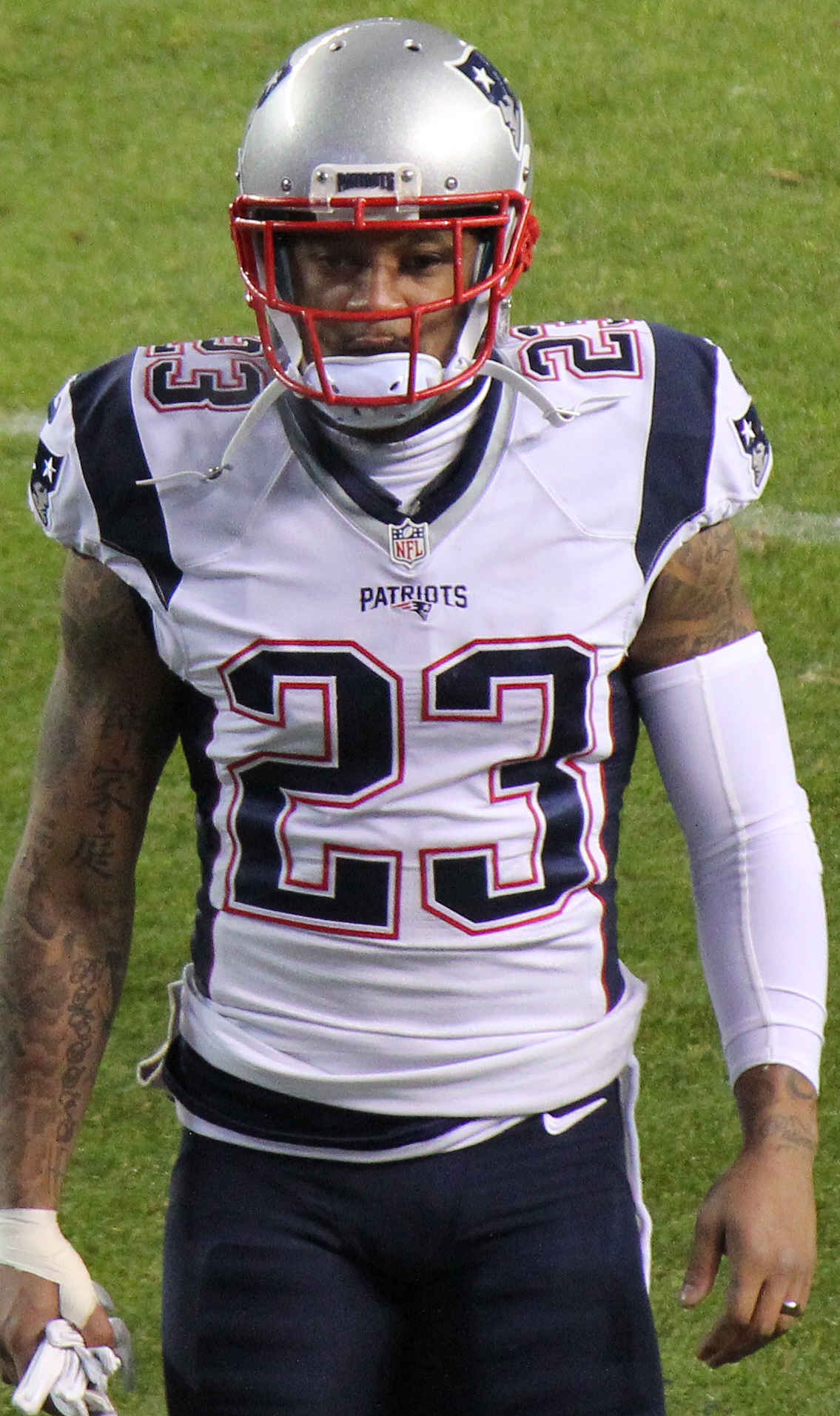
Chung in 2016

On April 1, 2016, the Patriots signed Chung to a one-year, $5.7 million extension with $1.8 million guaranteed and a signing bonus of $800,000. The agreement kept him under contract throughout the 2018 season.

During a Week 5 33–13 road victory over the Cleveland Browns, Chung made seven combined tackles, a pass deflection, and intercepted a pass by Charlie Whitehurst. Two weeks later against the Pittsburgh Steelers, Chung collected a season-high 11 combined tackles (seven solo) and two pass deflections in the 27–16 road victory. During Week 11 against the San Francisco 49ers, he collected nine combined tackles and sacked Colin Kaepernick once in the 30–17 road victory.

Chung finished the 2016 season with 91 combined tackles (52 solo), three pass deflections, an interception, and a sack in 16 games and starts. He received an overall grade of 56.5 from Pro Football Focus in 2016. The Patriots finished as the #1-seed in the AFC with a 14–2 record. They went on to reach the Super Bowl after defeating the Houston Texans 34–16 in the AFC Divisional Round and the Pittsburgh Steelers in the AFC Championship Game 36–17. On February 5, 2017, Chung recorded five combined tackles and two passes defended as the Patriots defeated the Atlanta Falcons by a score of 34–28 in overtime to win Super Bowl LI. The Super Bowl featured the first overtime game and largest comeback in Super Bowl history.

==== 2017 season ====
Head coach Bill Belichick retained Chung and McCourty as the starting safety duo to open the 2017 regular season.

During Week 10 against the Denver Broncos on Sunday Night Football, Chung recorded four solo tackles, broke up a pass, and returned an interception by Brock Osweiler for 30 yards in the 41–16 road victory. Two weeks later against the Miami Dolphins, he had 10 combined tackles (nine solo) in the 35–17 victory.

Chung finished the 2017 season with 84 combined tackles (71 solo), nine pass deflections, and a sack in 16 games and 11 starts. Pro Football Focus gave Chung an overall grade of 79.0 in 2017. His grade was the 42nd highest grade among all qualified safeties during the season. The Patriots finished atop the AFC East with a 13–3 record and clinched home-field advantage and a first round bye. They defeated the Tennessee Titans 35–14 in the AFC Divisional Round and the Jacksonville Jaguars 24–20 in the AFC Championship Game to secure their second consecutive Super Bowl appearance. On February 4, 2018, Chung started in Super Bowl LII and made six combined tackles before leaving the game with a concussion. The Patriots were defeated by the Philadelphia Eagles by a score of 41–33.

==== 2018 season ====
On March 19, 2018, the Patriots signed Chung to a two-year, $7.8 million contract extension with $5.12 million guaranteed and a signing bonus of $3.6 million, keeping him under contract through the 2020 season. Chung was also named a team captain for the first time. He finished the 2018 season with 0.5 sacks, 84 total tackles (52 solo), one interception, three passes defended, and a fumble recovery.

Chung was injured early in the second half of Super Bowl LIII against the Los Angeles Rams, sustaining a "right hand or wrist injury." An air cast was put on his arm, and Chung walked off the field. He did not return to the game, which the Patriots went on to win 13–3. After the game, Chung stated that he had broken his arm. On February 9, 2019, Chung underwent surgery on his broken forearm.

==== 2019 season ====
On April 12, 2019, Chung signed a one-year contract extension with the Patriots, keeping him under contract through the 2021 season. Chung finished the 2019 season with 51 total tackles (38 solo) and three passes defended in 13 games and 12 starts.

==== 2020 season ====
On May 20, 2020, Chung signed a two-year contract extension with the Patriots through the 2023 season. On July 29, he exercised his option to opt out of the 2020 season due to the ongoing COVID-19 pandemic.

=== Retirement ===
On March 18, 2021, Chung announced his retirement from the NFL after 12 seasons.

== NFL career statistics ==
Legend
	Won the Super Bowl
**Bold**	Career high

=== Regular season ===
Year	Team	Games		Tackles				Interceptions						Fumbles	
Year	Team	GP	GS	Comb	Solo	Ast	Sack	PD	Int	Yds	Avg	Lng	TD	FF	FR
2009	NE	16	1	37	25	12	**2.0**	1	1	2	2.0	2	0	**1**	0
2010	NE	14	13	**96**	**72**	24	0.0	**9**	**3**	**96**	**32.0**	**51T**	**1**	0	0
2011	NE	8	8	62	37	25	1.0	4	1	0	0.0	0	0	0	0
2012	NE	12	8	44	29	15	0.0	5	2	27	13.5	27	0	0	0
2013	PHI	12	10	59	39	20	0.0	3	0	0	0.0	0	0	0	1
2014	NE	16	15	85	54	31	0.0	8	1	10	10.0	10	0	0	0
2015	NE	15	14	85	52	33	0.0	**9**	0	0	0.0	0	0	**1**	0
2016	NE	16	16	91	52	**39**	1.0	3	1	4	4.0	4	0	0	1
2017	NE	16	11	84	71	13	0.0	**9**	1	30	30.0	30	0	0	**2**
2018	NE	15	14	84	52	32	0.5	3	1	2	2.0	2	0	0	1
2019	NE	13	12	51	38	13	0.0	3	0	0	0.0	0	0	0	0
2020	NE	0	0	Did not play due to Covid-19 opt-out											
Career		153	122	778	521	257	4.5	57	11	171	15.6	51T	1	2	5

=== Postseason ===
Year	Team	Games		Tackles				Interceptions						Fumbles	
Year	Team	GP	GS	Comb	Solo	Ast	Sack	PD	Int	Yds	Avg	Lng	TD	FF	FR
2009	NE	1	0	2	2	0	0.0	0	0	0	0.0	0	0	0	0
2010	NE	1	1	4	4	0	0.0	0	0	0	0.0	0	0	0	0
2011	NE	3	3	15	5	**10**	0.0	1	0	0	0.0	0	0	0	0
2012	NE	2	0	1	0	1	0.0	0	0	0	0.0	0	0	0	0
2013	PHI	1	1	4	4	0	0.0	0	0	0	0.0	0	0	0	0
2014	NE	3	3	10	8	2	0.0	0	0	0	0.0	0	0	0	0
2015	NE	2	2	14	8	6	0.0	0	0	0	0.0	0	0	0	0
2016	NE	3	3	17	7	**10**	0.0	**2**	0	0	0.0	0	0	0	0
2017	NE	3	3	**22**	**15**	7	0.0	0	0	0	0.0	0	0	0	0
2018	NE	3	3	13	7	6	0.0	1	0	0	0.0	0	0	0	**1**
2019	NE	1	1	1	0	1	0.0	0	0	0	0.0	0	0	0	0
Career		23	20	104	61	43	0.0	4	0	0	0.0	0	0	0	0

== Personal life ==
Chung is of partial Chinese Jamaican descent. His mother, Sophia George-Chung, is a Jamaican reggae artist who was popular in the 1980s. Chung's father, Ronald Chung, was a music producer and Sophia's manager. Chung has his Chinese name (钟家庭, Zhōng Jiātíng) tattooed on his right arm.

Chung has four brothers and three sisters. He had his first child, Taj James Chung, on September 18, 2010.

Chung was indicted on a charge of possession of cocaine in Laconia, New Hampshire, on August 21, 2019. This charge was conditionally dismissed on January 13, 2020.

On October 26, 2021, Chung was charged with assault after allegedly pushing a woman to the ground, slapping her face, and breaking her phone outside her home in Milton, Massachusetts.

Chung and former teammate Nate Ebner are minority owners of Major League Rugby's team New England Free Jacks. He is a three-time champion as owner with the team winning three straight titles in 2023, 2024, and 2025.
