= Picture This (song) =

Single by Blondie

from the album Parallel Lines
- B-side: "Fade Away and Radiate"
- Released: August 1978
- Recorded: 1978
- Genre: New wave; power pop; sunshine pop
- Length: 2:59
- Label: Chrysalis (UK)
- Songwriters: Chris Stein; Deborah Harry; Jimmy Destri
- Producer: Mike Chapman

Blondie singles chronology
"(I'm Always Touched by Your) Presence, Dear" (1978)	"Picture This" (1978)	"I'm Gonna Love You Too" (1978)

Audio sample
- Picture This: file; help

Music video
- "Picture This" on YouTube

"Picture This" is a 1978 song by the American rock band Blondie, released on their third album, Parallel Lines. Written by Chris Stein, Debbie Harry and Jimmy Destri, the song features evocative lyrics that producer Mike Chapman surmised were written by Harry about Stein.

"Picture This" was released as the debut single from Parallel Lines in the UK and Europe. The single reached number 12 on the UK Singles Chart and appeared in the top 20 in Sweden and on the Irish Singles Chart. It has since seen critical acclaim and has appeared on several compilations.

== Background ==
"Picture This" was written by Chris Stein, Debbie Harry and Jimmy Destri. According to Destri, Harry wrote the lyrics while Destri wrote the verse melody and Stein the chorus. Destri explained, "We all had little pieces of one anothers' songs, just throwing in bits. I always write with the band in mind."

Producer Mike Chapman spoke glowingly of Harry's lyrics, writing, "The lyric to this day to me is elusive and beautiful. And it all came from this amazing girl." He explained his initial reaction to the song:

When Debbie showed me the lyrics, I thought, "Woah." This was something she'd obviously lived through. She was singing about an event in her life. I guess she was watching Chris [Stein] shower! I wouldn't have wanted to watch Chris shower, but obviously Debbie enjoyed it!

Of the lyrics, Harry joked, "I was so excited that in 'Picture This' I rhymed 'solid' with 'wallet.' I thought, 'Wow! Things are happening now!'"

== Release ==
"Picture This" was released in the UK in 1978 as the lead single from their third album Parallel Lines. It reached number 12 on the UK Singles Chart, giving Blondie their third UK Top 20 hit. It also charted in various other countries but was not issued as a single in the US. The B-side of the single, "Fade Away And Radiate", featured Robert Fripp on guitar and was also included on the Parallel Lines album. "Picture This" was included on the international version of the band's first 'greatest hits' compilation The Best of Blondie, released in October 1981.

A music video was produced and released to promote the single, featuring a straight performance by the band. In the video, Debbie Harry wore a yellow dress created by fashion designer Stephen Sprouse.

== Reception ==
"Picture This" has seen critical acclaim since its release. Music critic Arion Berger of Rolling Stone called "Picture This" "the tenderest new wave love song put to vinyl". Slant Magazine praised Harry's vocal range on the track, "her voice purring like a kitten and then building to a mean growl." Pitchfork lauded the song as "exuberant new wave, far looser than the stiff, herky-jerky tracks that would go on to characterize that sound in the 80s".

Ultimate Classic Rock named "Picture This" as Blondie's ninth best song, writing, "The springy hook and girl-group snap of 'Picture This' turned out to be just the start of the album's treasures."

== Release history ==
UK 7" (CHS 2242, August 1978)

1. "Picture This" (Chris Stein, Deborah Harry, Jimmy Destri) – 2:53
2. "Fade Away And Radiate" (Chris Stein) – 3:57

== Charts ==
Chart (1978)	Peak position
Australia (Kent Music Report)	88
Ireland (IRMA)	13
Sweden (Sverigetopplistan)	15
UK Singles (Official Charts)	12

== Certifications ==
Region	Certification	Certified units/sales
United Kingdom (BPI)	Silver	250,000^{^}
^{^} Shipments figures based on certification alone.
