= The Curse of Blondie =

Studio album by Blondie
- Released: October 13, 2003
- Recorded: 2003
- Genres: New wave; post-punk revival
- Length: 65:19
- Labels: Sanctuary (US); Epic (UK)
- Producers: Steve Thompson (except "Good Boys", produced by Jeff Bova)

Blondie chronology
Greatest Hits (2002)	The Curse of Blondie (2003)	Live by Request (2004)

Singles from The Curse of Blondie
- 1. "Good Boys" Released: October 6, 2003

Alternative cover
- UK slipcase cover

The Curse of Blondie is the eighth studio album from the American rock band Blondie. It was released in October 2003, and peaked at number 36 on the UK Albums Chart.

== Background and recording ==
Towards the end of 2002, Beyond Music abruptly closed down following a dispute, and Blondie signed with Sony Music. The Curse of Blondie had the working title Phasm 8, which was also the name of the tour they were doing before the release. Craig Leon, who had also produced their previous hit album No Exit, started work on the album, but it was four years in the making as the only demo tapes of the album had disappeared from luggage at a UK airport, and so had to be re-recorded. Leon ultimately did not produce the album, which was largely helmed by Steve Thompson with Jeff Bova producing one track, "Good Boys".

The album incorporates a rock-inspired arrangement style more reminiscent of Blondie's earliest recordings. Rhythms played include mostly rock ("Golden Rod, "Rules for Living", "End to End", "Hello Joe", "Last One in the World", "Diamond Bridge") and then dance-pop ("Good Boys", "Undone", "The Tingler"). Other incursions are Japanese traditional music ("Magic (Asadoya Yunta)"), reggae ("Background Melody (The Only One)"), jazz ("Desire Brings Me Back", "Songs of Love (For Richard)") and rap ("Shakedown"). The track "Hello Joe" is an homage to Joey Ramone, and includes a reference to "Blitzkrieg Bop" ("hey ho, ¡hola Joe!" instead of "hey ho, let's go!").

== Release ==
The album was released with various bonus tracks in some territories, while the US edition included the music video for the single "Good Boys". The album was also re-released in 2004 in US on DualDisc format. The CD side contained the normal album, while the DVD side included:

1. Entire album in 5.1 Surround Sound and Stereo
2. "Good Boys" music video
3. Photo gallery
4. ROM content

The only single from the album was "Good Boys", which peaked at #12 in the UK and was a dance hit in the USA. Promo singles of "Undone" were sent to radio, but no official release was made.

== Reception ==
Professional ratings
Aggregate scores
Source	Rating
Metacritic	63/100
Review scores
Source	Rating
AllMusic	3/5 stars
Blender	3/5 stars
Encyclopedia of Popular Music	3/5 stars
Entertainment Weekly	B+
The Guardian	3/5 stars
PopMatters	5/10
Rolling Stone	2/5 stars
Slant Magazine	2/5 stars
Stylus Magazine	B+
Uncut	5/5 stars

The Curse of Blondie gained mixed reviews, some critics called it a good or very good album, while others said it was a downfall for the band. Critics highlighted the band's songwriting and soundcrafting ("a pop masterclass", Uncut), as well as the maturity in which they experiment with different genres as "they never pretend they’re something they’re not, such as young" (Blender). Following its release in 2003, Blondie embarked on a two-year long international world tour, playing more than 160 gigs in Europe, Asia, the three Americas and Oceania. TV performances included The Today Show, The Late Show with David Letterman, The Late Late Show with Craig Kilborn, Good Day Live, Top of the Pops, and specials "Women Rock!" and "VH1 Divas Live". Blondie also performed at Live by Request and subsequently released a CD/DVD of the performance.

Despite the relative success of the "Good Boys" single, the album performed poorly, peaking at #36 in the UK and #160 in the United States. As of August 9, 2005 it has sold 34,000 copies in United States.

== Track listing ==
No.	Title	Lyrics	Music	Length
1.	"Shakedown"	Debbie Harry; Romy Ashby	Chris Stein	5:05
2.	"Good Boys"	Kevin Griffin; Harry	Griffin	4:18
3.	"Undone"	Harry	Craig Bartock; John Vitale	4:28
4.	"Golden Rod"	Harry	Leigh Foxx	5:23
5.	"Rules for Living"	Jimmy Destri	Destri	5:12
6.	"Background Melody (The Only One)"	Destri; Harry	Destri; Harry	3:54
7.	"Magic (Asadoya Yunta)"	Harry; Ashby	Traditional Okinawan folk song	4:05
8.	"End to End"	Harry; Ashby	Stein	3:59
9.	"Hello Joe"	Harry; Ashby	Stein	4:06
10.	"The Tingler"	Harry	Stein	3:52
11.	"Last One in the World"	Destri	Destri	4:31
12.	"Diamond Bridge"	Harry	Destri	4:07
13.	"Desire Brings Me Back"	Carla Olla	Gretchen Langheld	5:31
14.	"Songs of Love"	Langheld	Langheld	6:43

European edition bonus track
No.	Title	Lyrics	Music	Length
15.	"Good Boys" (Giorgio Moroder single mix)	Griffin; Harry	Griffin	4:06

Japanese edition bonus tracks
No.	Title	Writer(s)	Length
15.	"The Tide Is High" (live at Summer Sonic 03)	John Holt; Tyrone Evans; Howard Barrett	4:35
16.	"Rapture" (live at Summer Sonic 03)	Harry; Stein	7:16

== Personnel ==
Blondie

- Debbie Harry – vocals
- Chris Stein – guitar
- Jimmy Destri – keyboards
- Clem Burke – drums

Additional musicians

- Jimi K. Bones
- Paul Carbonara
- Gretchen Langheld
- Frank Pagaro
- Leigh Foxx
- James Mazlen
- Kyle Whelan – soprano saxophone ("Songs of Love")

Production and design

- Steve Thompson – producer (except "Good Boys"), mixing (except "Magic (Asadoya Yunta)")
- Jeff Bova – producer ("Good Boys")
- Kevin Griffin – additional production ("Good Boys")
- Allen Kovac – executive producer
- Craig Leon – producer (basic tracks, except "Good Boys", "Undone" and "Background Melody (The Only One)")
- James Michael – additional production (basic tracks, except "Good Boys", "Undone" and "Background Melody (The Only One)")
- Randy Nicklaus – additional production (basic tracks, except "Good Boys", "Undone" and "Background Melody (The Only One)")
- Jinsoo Kim – mixing ("Magic (Asadoya Yunta)")
- Christina Ingram – mixing ("Magic (Asadoya Yunta)")
- John Goodmanson – engineer, mixing
- Paul Logus – engineer
- Danni Bernini – engineer
- Roy Hendrickson – engineer
- Tom Weir – engineer
- Ross Petersen – assistant engineer
- Sean Spuehler – programming
- Howie Beno – programming
- James Mazlen – programming
- George Marino – mastering
- Giorgio Moroder – additional production and remix ("Good Boys" (Giorgio Moroder Single Mix))
- Tommy Schobel – programming ("Good Boys (Giorgio Moroder Single Mix)")
- Patrick Shevelin – programming ("Good Boys (Giorgio Moroder Single Mix)")
- Steve Shepherd – remix engineer ("Good Boys (Giorgio Moroder Single Mix)")
- Robert Roth – art direction, photography
- Kitty Boots – stylist
- Marla Belt – make-up

== Charts ==
Chart (2003–04)	Peak position
Australian Albums (ARIA)	83
French Albums (SNEP)	113
German Albums (Offizielle Top 100)	84
Scottish Albums (Official Charts)	37
UK Albums (Official Charts)	36
US Billboard 200	160
