= I'm Gonna Love You Too =

1958 single by Buddy Holly

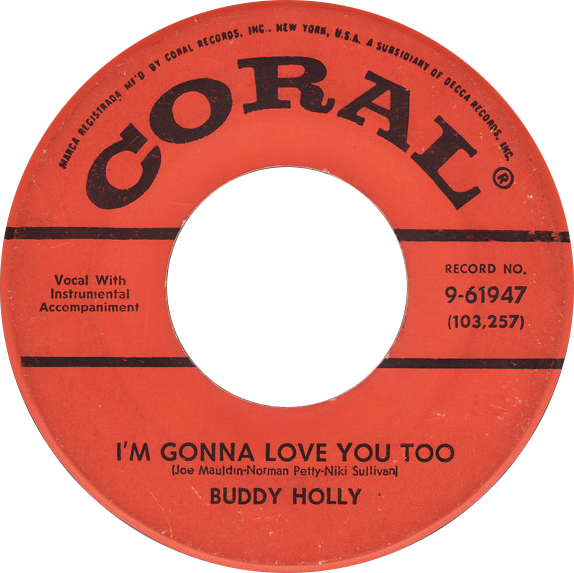
- Side A of US vinyl single

Single by Buddy Holly
- B-side: "Listen to Me"
- Released: February 5, 1958
- Recorded: July 12, 1957
- Studio: Norman Petty Recording Studios (Clovis, New Mexico)
- Genre: Rockabilly
- Length: 2:13
- Label: Coral
- Songwriters: Joe B. Mauldin, Niki Sullivan, Norman Petty
- Producer: Norman Petty

Buddy Holly singles chronology
"Love Me" (1958)	"I'm Gonna Love You Too" (1958)	"Rave On" (1958)

"I'm Gonna Love You Too" is a song originally recorded and released by Buddy Holly as a single in 1958 on Coral Records. It was covered 20 years later by American new wave band Blondie and released as the lead single in the U.S. from their multi-platinum 1978 album Parallel Lines.

== Song history ==
The song is listed on the record label as written by Joe B. Mauldin, Niki Sullivan and Norman Petty but this has been disputed. There is controversy about the authorship of the song. Jerry Allison has stated that Buddy Holly was the actual author of the song. William Ruhlmann noted:

The song is credited to Joe B. Mauldin, Holly's bass player; Norman Petty, his producer; and Nikki Sullivan, his sometime rhythm guitarist (who was not heard on the recording). There have long been questions about the songwriting credits assigned to the original songs Holly recorded, and Jerry Allison, his drummer, has gone on record stating that "I'm Gonna Love You Too" actually was written primarily by Holly, with Allison composing the bridge. Certainly the song sounds characteristic of the man who wrote "That'll Be the Day." It is another up-tempo number with an infectious tune and boastful lyrics that only thinly veil heartbreak.

Of the song's credited authors, two (Mauldin and Sullivan) were members of Holly's band The Crickets; the third, Petty, was Holly's first manager and also his recording engineer and customarily took a songwriting credit to obtain song royalties regardless of whether he wrote the song or not.

Similarly, Buddy Holly's name was left off of the songwriting credits for "Peggy Sue" on the record label and sheet music initially and only later corrected. A possible motive is to give his band members songwriting royalties as a form of payment.

Holly included the song on his self-titled second album. It was released as a single on Coral Records, but failed to crack the Billboard Hot 100. In Canada, the b-side "Listen To Me" reached #38. Holly continued to sell regionally in the upper midwest USA after his death and when rereleased, "I'm Gonna Love You Too" was a substantial 'regional' hit in Minneapolis and surrounding markets in 1964. When the song was recorded an actual cricket was in the studio. As the song is ending and fading out, you can hear the cricket chirp a couple of times.

== Blondie version ==
"I'm Gonna Love You Too"
- Side A of US vinyl single of Blondie recording

Single by Blondie

from the album Parallel Lines
- B-side: Just Go Away (US); Fan Mail (Holland)
- Released: September 1978
- Recorded: 1978
- Genre: Rock and roll
- Length: 2:03
- Label: Chrysalis (US)
- Songwriters: Joe B. Mauldin; Niki Sullivan; Norman Petty
- Producer: Mike Chapman

Blondie singles chronology
"Picture This" (1978)	"I'm Gonna Love You Too" (1978)	"Hanging on the Telephone" (1978)

Audio sample
- I'm Gonna Love You Too: file; help

Alternative cover
- Picture sleeve for European vinyl single, manufactured in the Netherlands

Music video
- "I'm Gonna Love You Too" (TopPop, 1978) on YouTube

The biggest hit from Blondie's previous album, Plastic Letters, was "Denis", a cover of Randy & the Rainbows' 1963 song "Denise", so Chrysalis Records chose "I'm Gonna Love You Too" as the lead single to promote Blondie's Parallel Lines in the U.S. This turned out to be a miscalculation as "I'm Gonna Love You Too" failed to chart in the U.S. – a stark contrast to the subsequent breakthrough U.S. singles from Parallel Lines, namely "Hanging on the Telephone", "Heart of Glass" and "One Way or Another". In The Netherlands, it was the first single from the album as well, being released in September 1978, where it peaked at No. 6. The song was eventually released as a single in a few other countries in late 1979 as the fifth or sixth single from Parallel Lines, after other songs from the album had completed their run in the charts.

Record World said that Blondie "added their own signature sound [to the Buddy Holly original] for a cross-decade effect."

=== Release history ===
US 7" (CHS 2251)

1. "I'm Gonna Love You Too" (Joe B. Mauldin, Norman Petty, Niki Sullivan) – 2:03
2. "Just Go Away" (Debbie Harry) – 3:21

Holland 7" (15729)

1. "I'm Gonna Love You Too" (Joe B. Mauldin, Norman Petty, Niki Sullivan) – 2:03
2. "Fan Mail" (Jimmy Destri) – 2:35

=== Chart information ===
Chart (1978)	Peak Position
Belgium (Ultratop 50 Flanders)	3
Finland (Suomen virallinen lista)	28
Netherlands (Single Top 100)	6

== Other versions ==
Adam Faith included the song on his self-titled album released in 1961.

The song was covered by the Hullaballoos in 1964 in a version that reached No. 56 in the U.S.

Jimmy Gilmer of The Fireballs fame covered the song on his 1965 album Buddy's Buddy: Buddy Holly Songs by Jimmy Gilmer.

Roky Erickson recorded a studio version of the song with his band 13th Floor Elevators that first saw release as the B-side to the group’s 1968 single, “May The Circle Remain Unbroken”. This studio and different live versions have appeared as bonus tracks on various editions of 13th Floor Elevators’ albums and compilations.

Terry Jacks also covered the song on his 1974 album Seasons in the Sun, and also releasing it as a single, which failed to chart in the USA, but made No.7 in Canada.

In 1974, Paul McCartney recorded an acoustic version of this song as part of what became known as "The Backyard" sessions. Although frequently bootlegged, it was not officially released until 2024 on the One Hand Clapping album.

Denny Laine, guitarist of Wings and the Moody Blues, covered the song on his tribute album Holly Days (1977), produced by Paul McCartney.

In 2012, Jenny O. covered the song on the tribute album Rave on Buddy Holly.

== Sources ==
- Bustard, Anne (2005). Buddy: The Story of Buddy Holly. Simon & Schuster. ISBN 978-1-4223-9302-4.
- Dawson, Jim; Leigh, Spencer (1996). Memories of Buddy Holly. Big Nickel Publications. ISBN 978-0-936433-20-2.
- Goldrosen, John; Beecher, John (1996). Remembering Buddy: The Definitive Biography. New York: Da Capo Press. ISBN 0-306-80715-7.
- Goldrosen, John (1975). Buddy Holly: His Life and Music. Popular Press. ISBN 0-85947-018-0
- Laing, Dave (1971–2010). Buddy Holly. Icons of Pop Music. Bloomington, IN: Indiana University Press. ISBN 0-253-22168-4. OCLC 611172616.
- Mann, Alan (1996). The A-Z of Buddy Holly. Aurum Press (2nd edition). ISBN 1-85410-433-0 or 978–1854104335.
- Norman, Phillip (1996) Rave On: The Biography of Buddy Holly. Simon & Schuster Publishing. ISBN 0684800829.
- Peer, Elizabeth and Ralph II (1972). Buddy Holly: A Biography in Words, Photographs and Music Australia: Peer International. ASIN B000W24DZO.
- Peters, Richard (1990). The Legend That Is Buddy Holly. Barnes & Noble Books. ISBN 0-285-63005-9 or 978–0285630055.
- Rabin, Stanton (2009). OH BOY! The Life and Music of Rock 'n' Roll Pioneer Buddy Holly. Van Winkle Publishing (Kindle). ASIN B0010QBLLG.
- Tobler, John (1979). The Buddy Holly Story. Beaufort Books.
