= The Hullaballoos =

British band

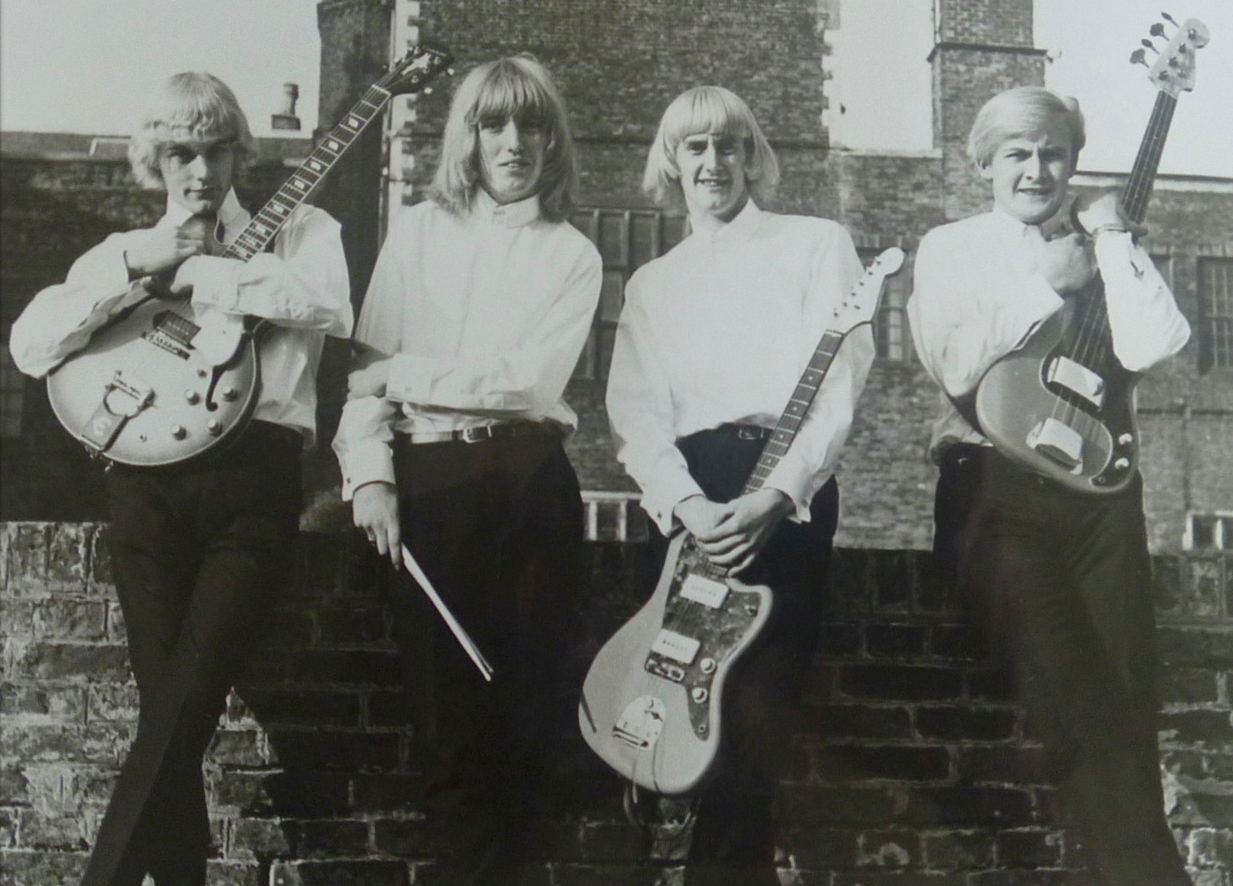
- The Hullaballoos at Burton Constable Hall

Background information
- Origin: Kingston upon Hull, England
- Genres: Pop, beat
- Years active: 1965–1966
- Labels: Roulette (US); Columbia (UK)
- Past members: Geoffrey Mortimer; Harry Dunn; Ricky Knight; Andrew Woonton; Mick Wayne

The Hullaballoos were one of the original British Invasion bands. They are best known for their 1965 cover of Buddy Holly's "I'm Gonna Love You Too".

== Biography ==
The Hullaballoos were created in September 1964, but had been working in the UK for over three years under the name of Ricky Knight and The Crusaders. They were not named after the American television programme Hullabaloo. Their name came from the city of Hull, England, whence they hailed. The band consisted of Geoff Mortimer (bass guitar and harmonies, born Geoffrey Mortimer, 30 May 1945, Kingston upon Hull), Harry Dunn (drums and harmonies, born Harold Stanley Dunn, 6 December 1947, Kingston upon Hull), Ricky Knight (lead singer and rhythm guitar, born Ronald Mitchell, 10 October 1944, Kingston upon Hull) and Andy Woonton (lead guitar and harmonies, born Andrew Charles Wooten, 19 July 1943, Croydon, Surrey). They all sang harmony vocals.

The group's look (featuring long dyed blonde hair) and music was put together by Luigi Creatore and Hugo Peretti of Roulette Records to take advantage of the popularity in the United States of British Invasion bands. Signed to Roulette in the US, their UK records appeared on the Columbia label. .They recorded two albums: England's Newest Singing Sensations and On Hullabaloo (both 1965). Both albums are now available on a single CD.

The group did make a successful tour throughout the U.S. in 1965. They appeared on Hullaballo and Shindig television shows, among others.

Having been signed by Roullette Records and their CEO, Morris Levy, the Group did not know his association with a major Crime syndicate. Therefore, their Royalties from their two LPs were non-existent. The lads received zero payments.This caused a tremendous riff in the band.

Following their U.S. tour, the group split up.

Wooten left first and after a number of auditions he was replaced for a short time by Mick Wayne (born Michael David Wayne, 7 October 1943, Hammersmith, West London – died 24 June 1994, Michigan, US) but the group broke up for good in 1966. In May 2010, the original members Knight, Dunn, and Woonton re-united for one-off concert. Mortimer was unable to attend.

On 17 December 2016, Geoffrey Mortimer died from cancer, at the age of 71. On 27 August 2017, Harry Dunn died from an undisclosed illness.

== Members ==
- Ricky Knight (born Ronald Mitchell, 10 October 1944, Kingston upon Hull) — lead singer and rhythm guitar
- Andy Woonton (born Andrew Charles Wooten, 19 July 1943, Croydon, Surrey) — lead guitar and harmonies
- Geoff Mortimer (born Geoffrey Mortimer, 30 May 1945, Kingston upon Hull — died 17 December 2016) — bass guitar and harmonies
- Harry Dunn (born Harold Stanley Dunn, 6 December 1947, Kingston upon Hull — died 27 August 2017) — drums and harmonies

== Chart singles ==
- "Did You Ever" (1965) – US Billboard Hot 100 No. 74
- "I'm Gonna Love You Too" – US Hot 100 No. 56
