= Parallel Lines 30th Anniversary Tour =

2008 concert tour by Blondie

- World tour by Blondie
- Location: Asia; Europe; North America
- Associated album: Parallel Lines
- Start date: June 5, 2008
- End date: August 4, 2008
- Legs: 2
- No. of shows: 38

Blondie concert chronology
- Phasm 8 Tour (2003–2005); Parallel Lines 30th Anniversary Tour (2008); Endangered Species Tour (2010)

The Parallel Lines 30th Anniversary Tour was a 2008 worldwide concert tour by Blondie both to promote the 30th anniversary re-release of their ground-breaking 1978 album Parallel Lines, and to celebrate the longevity and success of the album. Concerts were held in North America and Europe with a single stop in Israel.

== Background ==
The tour was announced in April 2008 with the band also releasing a tour promo video.

A live performance of all or most of the Parallel Lines album, in its original order, opened each concert. Songs including "Just Go Away", "11:59", "Will Anything Happen?", and "Pretty Baby" from Parallel Lines were omitted from certain concerts, making it uncommon to find a concert featuring all twelve songs from the original album. These tracks were followed by a selection of songs from Blondie's back catalog, Deborah Harry's solo album Necessary Evil which was released the previous year, the 2008 non-album single "Fit Right In", and covers.

The tour marked Blondie's first performances in Israel and Russia, and the arrival of band member Matt Katz-Bohen on keyboards.

== Opening acts ==
- The Stranglers

== Tour dates ==
List of 2008 concerts
| Date | City | Country | Venue |
|---|---|---|---|
| June 5, 2008 | Baltimore | United States | Rams Head Live! |
| June 6, 2008 | Englewood | United States | Bergen Performing Arts Center |
| June 8, 2008 | Jackson | United States | Northern Star Arena |
| June 10, 2008 | Kingston | United States | Ulster Performing Arts Center |
| June 12, 2008 | Orillia | Canada | Casino Rama |
| June 13, 2008 | Orillia | Canada | Casino Rama |
| June 14, 2008 | Niagara Falls | United States | Seneca Niagara Resort & Casino |
| June 17, 2008 | Red Bank | United States | Count Basie Theatre |
| June 18, 2008 | Farmingville | United States | Brookhaven Amphitheater |
| June 20, 2008 | Hyannis | United States | Cape Cod Melody Tent |
| June 21, 2008 | Cohasset | United States | South Shore Music Circus |
| June 22, 2008 | New York City | United States | Nokia Theatre Times Square |
| June 24, 2008 | Louisville | United States | Brown Theatre |
| June 26, 2008 | New Cumberland | United States | Mountaineer Casino, Racetrack and Resort |
| June 27, 2008 | Chicago | United States | Lincoln Park Zoo |
| June 28, 2008 (Note: The June 28, 2008, concert in Milwaukee was part of Summerfest.) | Milwaukee | United States | Henry Maier Festival Park |
| July 3, 2008 | Ra'anana | Israel | Ra'anana Amphitheatre |
| July 5, 2008 (Note: The July 5, 2008, concert in Guildford was part of GuilFest.) | Guildford | England | Stoke Park |
| July 6, 2008 | Bristol | England | Carling Academy Bristol |
| July 8, 2008 | Saint Petersburg | Russia | BKZ Oktyabrsky |
| July 9, 2008 | Moscow | Russia | B1 Maximum Club |
| July 10, 2008 | Helsinki | Finland | Kulttuuritalo |
| July 12, 2008 (Note: The July 12, 2008, concert in Zottegem was part of Rock Zottegem.) | Zottegem | Belgium | Zwembad Bevegemse Vijvers |
| July 13, 2008 | Zürich | Switzerland | X-Tra |
| July 15, 2008 | Luxembourg City | Luxembourg | Den Atelier |
| July 16, 2008 | Amsterdam | Netherlands | Paradiso |
| July 18, 2008 (Note: The July 18, 2008, concert in Barcelona was part of Rock Summercase Barcelona.) | Barcelona | Spain | Parc del Fòrum |
| July 19, 2008 (Note: The July 19, 2008, concert in Madrid was part of Rock Summercase Madrid.) | Madrid | Spain | Boadilla del Monte |
| July 20, 2008 (Note: The July 20, 2008, concert in Suffolk was part of Latitude Festival.) | Suffolk | England | Henham Park |
| July 22, 2008 | Liverpool | England | Echo Arena Liverpool |
| July 24, 2008 (Note: The July 24, 2008, concert in Galway was part of Rock Galway Arts Festival.) | Galway | Ireland | Fisheries Field |
| July 25, 2008 | Dublin | Ireland | Vicar Street |
| July 26, 2008 | Glasgow | Scotland | Carling Academy Glasgow |
| July 28, 2008 (Note: The July 28, 2008, concert in London was part of the British International Motor Show Music Festival.) | London | England | ExCeL London |
| July 31, 2008 (Note: The July 31, 2008, concert in Östersund was part of Storsjöyran.) | Östersund | Sweden | Stortorget |
| August 1, 2008 (Note: The August 1, 2008, concert in Storås was part of Storåsfestivalen.) | Storås | Norway | Heggøya |
| August 2, 2008 | Oslo | Norway | Rockefeller Music Hall |
| August 4, 2008 | Copenhagen | Denmark | Store Vega |

== Personnel ==
Band

- Debbie Harry – vocals
- Chris Stein – guitars
- Clem Burke – drums
- Matt Katz-Bohen – keyboards, piano, organ
- Leigh Foxx – bass
- Paul Carbonara – guitars

Crew

- Jim Roese – stage manager
