= Hanging on the Telephone =

1976 song by Jack Lee

Song by The Nerves
- Released: 1976
- Genre: Power pop
- Length: 2:02
- Songwriter: Jack Lee

"Hanging on the Telephone" is a song written by Jack Lee. The song was released in 1976 by his short-lived US West Coast power pop band the Nerves; in 1978, it was recorded and released as a single by American new wave band Blondie.

Blondie had discovered the song on a cassette tape compilation given to the band by Jeffrey Lee Pierce. Beginning with a phone sound-effect courtesy of producer Mike Chapman, Blondie's version of the song was released on the band's breakthrough third album, Parallel Lines. The single was a top five hit on the UK singles chart and has since seen critical acclaim as one of the band's best songs.

== Background ==
"Hanging on the Telephone" was originally written by Jack Lee for his band, the Nerves. The song appeared as the lead-off track on the Nerves's 1976 EP; however, the release was a commercial failure and became the group's only release. Long after the song's eventual commercial success, Lee reflected "Even people who hated me – and there were plenty – had to admit it was great."

== Blondie version ==
"Hanging on the Telephone"
- US picture sleeve

Single by Blondie

from the album Parallel Lines
- B-side: "Will Anything Happen" (UK); "Fade Away and Radiate" (US)
- Released: November 1978
- Genre: New wave; power pop; pop-punk
- Length: 2:17
- Label: Chrysalis
- Songwriter: Jack Lee
- Producer: Mike Chapman

Blondie singles chronology
"I'm Gonna Love You Too" (1978)	"Hanging on the Telephone" (1978)	"Heart of Glass" (1979)

Music video
- "Hanging on the Telephone" on YouTube

The song was later popularized by new wave band Blondie, who covered the track on their 1978 album, Parallel Lines. The band discovered the song after Jeffrey Lee Pierce of the Gun Club, a friend of Harry and Stein and president of a Blondie fan club, sent the band a cassette of the track. Blondie lead singer Debbie Harry explained:

We were playing it in the back of a taxicab in Tokyo, and the taxicab driver started tapping his hand on the steering wheel. When we came back to the US, we found that the Nerves weren't together anymore and we said, 'Gee, we should record this.'

Lee had been financially struggling at the time; he recalled the moment the band called him to ask permission to cover the song. "I remember the day vividly. It was a Friday. They were going to cut off our electricity at six o'clock, the phone too." The band also performed a version of the Lee-penned track, "Will Anything Happen", on Parallel Lines.

Blondie's version of the song begins with a sound effect of a telephone system ringing tone. The idea was proposed by producer Mike Chapman; he recalled "The Blondies all thought that was stupid and too gimmicky, but I said, 'C'mon, guys! Gimmicky? This is Blondie. Let's give it a try!'". The single was recorded in New York, but the telephone sound effect that opens the track is not the US version, but the two-ring signal used in the United Kingdom - Chapman asked recording engineer Peter Coleman to phone anyone he knew in the UK, and they recorded the outgoing phone line. Like one of Blondie's subsequent singles, "Sunday Girl", "Hanging on the Telephone" employs a double backbeat rhythm in its drumming pattern, meaning the "off" beats alternate between a quarter note and two eighth notes. This percussion style also appeared on other power pop singles from the period, like the Romantics' 1978 release "Tell It to Carrie".

=== Release ===
Blondie released their cover of "Hanging on the Telephone" the second single from their 1978 album Parallel Lines in both the US and UK. The single failed to chart in the US, but it eventually reached number five in the UK in November 1978.

The single also was a moderate hit throughout Europe, reaching the top 20 in Ireland, Belgium, and the Netherlands.

=== Reception ===
Blondie's cover of "Hanging on the Telephone" has seen critical acclaim since its release, with several writers praising Blondie's interpretation as an improvement on the original. Rolling Stone called the song "immortal and breathless," while Tom Maginnis of AllMusic praised the song's "driving power and infectious melody." The Rolling Stone Album Guide named the song "a dynamic rock & roll opener," while Pitchfork praised the song as "incredible." Cash Box said that it has a "fast clipping beat, varied guitar work and good lead vocals by Deborah Harry." Record World called it a "fast-paced pop-rock gem with a good vocal."

The Independent named the song the third best Blondie song, writing "Blondie make this song their own by injecting a previously absent sense of urgency to the build, with Harry's tone developing from stern to desperate as she begs: 'Hang up and run to me.'" The Guardian ranked the song as the band's fourth best, calling the song "far superior" to the Nerves original and dubbing it "a massive power pop tune," while Ultimate Classic Rock ranked it as Blondie's seventh best, writing "Blondie retain the song's New Wave edge but sharpen the melody." Paste named the song as Blondie's eighth best, while The Telegraph and uDiscoverMusic both included the song in their unranked lists of Blondie's best songs.

=== Track listing ===
UK 7" (CHS 2266)

1. "Hanging on the Telephone" (Jack Lee) – 2:17
2. "Will Anything Happen" (Lee) – 2:55

US 7" (CHS 2271)

1. "Hanging on the Telephone" (Lee) – 2:17
2. "Fade Away and Radiate" (Chris Stein) – 3:57

=== Charts ===
Chart (1978)	Peak position
Australia (Kent Music Report)	39
Belgium (Ultratop 50 Flanders)	19
Ireland (IRMA)	16
Netherlands (Dutch Top 40)	21
Netherlands (Single Top 100)	20
New Zealand (Recorded Music NZ)	43
UK Singles (Official Charts)	5

=== Certifications ===
Region	Certification	Certified units/sales
United Kingdom (BPI)	Silver	250,000^{^}
^{^} Shipments figures based on certification alone.

== Other versions and appearances ==
Blondie re-recorded the song for the 2014 2-disc set Blondie 4(0) Ever.

In 1995, L7 recorded a cover for the soundtrack to The Jerky Boys: The Movie.
In 2000, Finnish metal band Sinergy recorded a cover for their To Hell and Back album.
In 2003, alternative rock music band Something For Kate covered the song at a gig at The Prince Bandroom, disguised as "George Kaplan & The Editors".

In 2005, English indie punk-rock band Johnny Panic released a version of the song as a B-side to their single 'Minority of One'.
In 2006, English rock band Def Leppard recorded their own version for their cover album Yeah!
Also in 2006, British-Irish pop girl group Girls Aloud included a cover of the song on a bonus disc for their greatest hits album The Sound of Girls Aloud
In 2009, Jimmy Somerville covered the song on his acoustic album Suddenly Last Summer.
In 2012, Flowers Forever covered the song for the movie Electrick Children.
In 2017, Melissa Rauch covered the song as Harley Quinn in the animated film Batman and Harley Quinn.
In 2026, the song played during the end credits of the 2nd episode of Ponies, which was also titled after the song.
