= Live by Request =

Television series (1996–2004)

Live by Request is a television show that aired on the A&E Network from 1996 to 2004. Hosted by Mark McEwen, the show featured notable artists holding concerts where the set list would be determined by viewer phone calls.

The show was created based on an idea by Tony Bennett, who starred in its first episode on Valentine's Day 1996; during that episode, 1.5 million calls came in from viewers with requests. The show won the Emmy Awards for Individual Performance in a Variety or Music Program in 1996. It also won a CableACE Award.

Johnny Mathis' appearance on the show holds the record for the most viewers watching on live television, and has been released on DVD. In November 2009, PBS broadcast a John Fogerty concert under the Live by Request series as a pledge drive event.

Some the show's performances would be released as albums of the same name by the artists, including:

- (1997) Tony Bennett
- (2000) k.d. lang
- (2003) Kenny Rogers
- (2003) Barry Manilow
- (2004) Blondie

Other performers on the show, which has run on an as-appropriate basis, have included B. B. King, Bee Gees, Chicago, David Bowie, Don Henley, Earth, Wind & Fire, Elton John, Elvis Costello, Eurythmics, Gloria Estefan, Hall & Oates, James Taylor, John Mellencamp, Lyle Lovett, Michael Bolton, Neil Diamond, Phil Collins, Reba McEntire, Santana, Trisha Yearwood, Vanessa Williams, and Vince Gill.
