= Panic of Girls Tour =

2011 concert tour by Blondie

- Tour by Blondie
- Location: Europe; North America
- Associated album: Panic of Girls
- Start date: July 7, 2011
- End date: October 9, 2011
- Legs: 2
- No. of shows: 42

Blondie concert chronology
- Endangered Species Tour (2010); Panic of Girls Tour (2011); Whip It to Shreds Tour (2012)

Panic of Girls Tour was a 2011 concert tour by the American new wave band Blondie, made as part of the support of their album Panic of Girls.

== Background ==
Like the band's previous concert tour, the Endangered Species Tour 2010, this tour also promoted Panic of Girls.

The tour kicked on July 6 at the Optimus Alive! Festival in Portugal and visited Spain, the Netherlands, Ireland, the United Kingdom during the first leg and the United States and Canada during the second.

== Tour dates ==
Date	City	Country	Venue
July 6, 2011	Oeiras	Portugal	Optimus Alive!
July 7, 2011	Bilbao	Spain	BBK Live Festival
July 10, 2011	Kinross	Scotland	T in the Park
July 11, 2011	London	England	Kew Gardens
July 13, 2011	London	England	Somerset House
July 14, 2011	Amsterdam	Netherlands	Paradiso
July 15, 2011	Lichtenvoorde	Netherlands	De Schans
July 17, 2011	London	England	Lovebox Festival
July 19, 2011	Dublin	Ireland	Olympia Theatre
July 20, 2011	Galway	Ireland	Festival Big Top
July 22, 2011	York	England	York Racecourse
July 23, 2011	Abbots Ripton	England	Secret Garden Party
July 24, 2011	Nottingham	England	Splendour Festival
July 26, 2011	Douglas	Isle of Man	Gaiety Theatre
July 28, 2011	Epsom	England	Epsom Downs Racecourse
July 29, 2011	Dorset	England	Camp Bestival
July 31, 2011	Hackthorpe	England	Kendal Calling Festival
August 1, 2011	Liverpool	England	O2 Academy Liverpool
September 3, 2011	Harris	United States	Island Resort and Casino
September 4, 2011	Prior Lake	United States	Mystic Lake Casino Hotel
September 5, 2011	Council Bluffs	United States	Harrah's Stir Cove
September 7, 2011	Chicago	United States	House of Blues
September 9, 2011	Windsor	Canada	The Colosseum at Caesars Windsor
September 10, 2011	Orillia	Canada	Casino Rama
September 12, 2011	New York City	United States	Highline Ballroom
September 13, 2011	New York City	United States	Highline Ballroom
September 14, 2011	Boston	United States	Wilbur Theatre
September 16, 2011	Atlantic City	United States	The Borgata
September 17, 2011	Clark	United States	UC Music Fest
September 18, 2011	Westbury	United States	NYCB Theatre
September 20, 2011	Silver Spring	United States	The Fillmore
September 21, 2011	Durham	United States	Durham Performing Arts Center
September 23, 2011	Alpharetta	United States	Verizon Wireless Amphitheatre
September 26, 2011	Hollywood	United States	Hard Rock Live
September 28, 2011	New Orleans	United States	Mahalia Jackson Theatre
September 29, 2011	Austin	United States	Moody Theater
October 1, 2011	Dallas	United States	Granada Theatre
October 2, 2011	Mescalero	United States	Inn of the Mountain Gods Resort & Casino
October 5, 2011	Los Angeles	United States	Club Nokia
October 7, 2011	Saratoga	United States	Mountain Winery
October 8, 2011	Las Vegas	United States	The Beach at Mandalay Bay Resort & Casino
October 9, 2011	Palm Desert	United States	McCallum Theatre

== Cancelled dates ==
Date	City	Country	Venue
September 24, 2011	Clearwater	United States	Ruth Eckerd Hall
October 4, 2011	Phoenix	United States	The Foundry

== Personnel ==
- Debbie Harry – vocals
- Chris Stein – guitar
- Clem Burke – drums, percussion
- Leigh Foxx – bass
- Matt Katz-Bohen – keyboards
- Tommy Kessler – guitar
