= Chris Berens =

Dutch painter

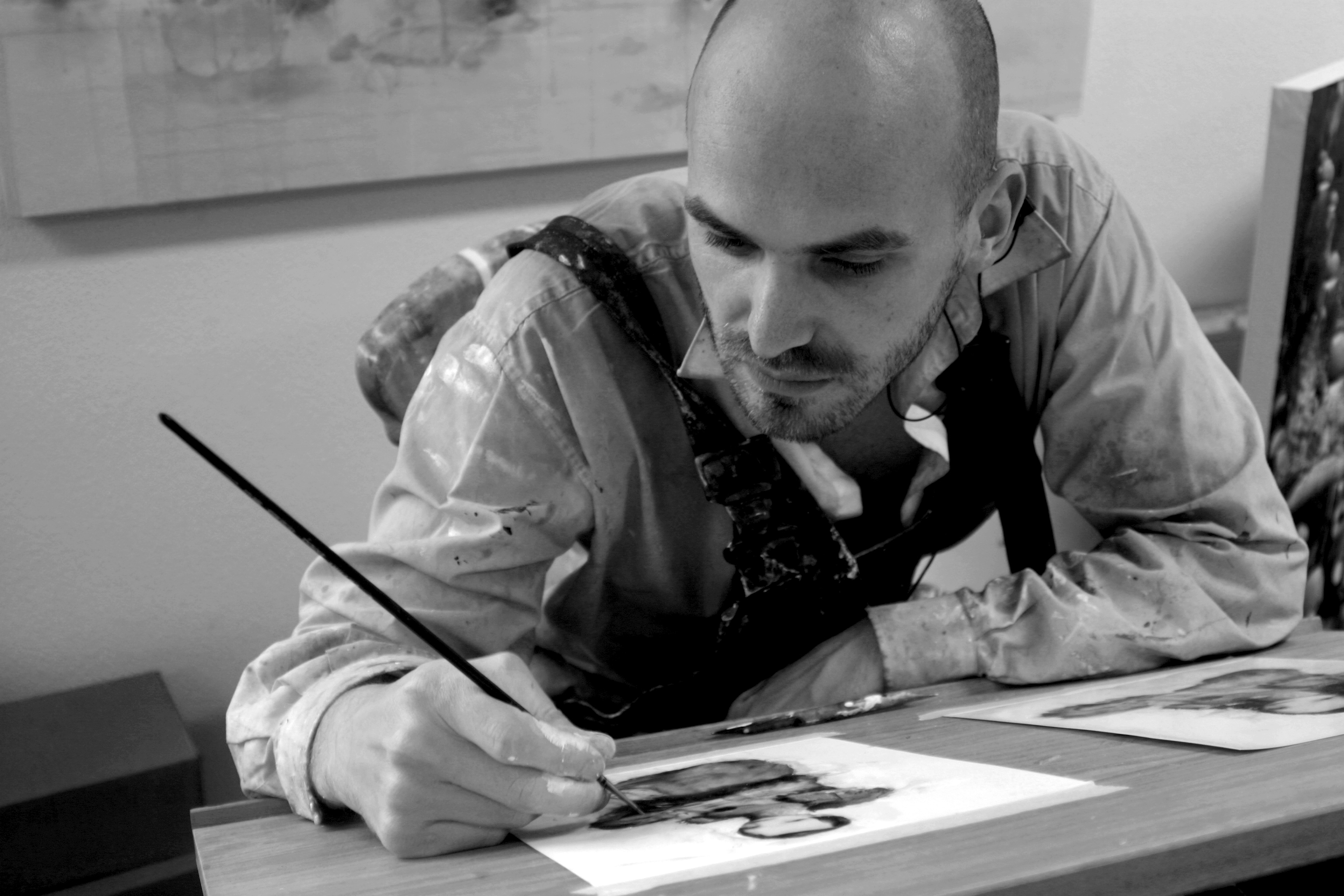
- Chris Berens in his studio in Amsterdam
- Born: June 19, 1976 (age 49); Oss, Netherlands
- Education: AKV St. Joost
- Known for: Painter
- Notable work: Circle of Friends; On a Midnight Voyage; The Departure; Utopiary

Chris Berens (born June 19, 1976) is a Dutch painter. While he takes inspiration from the quality of light in the paintings of Vermeer and Rembrandt, his themes lie more within the realms of surrealism and visionary art than traditional painting. Although his work is completely hand-painted, his paintings are often assumed to be digital photographic manipulation. He lives in Amsterdam with his wife Esther and their daughters Emma & Juno Leeuwenhart.

== Life ==
Chris Berens was born in 1976 in Oss, Netherlands, near the historic town of 's-Hertogenbosch, the birthplace of Hieronymous Bosch, a factor that would feature in his artistic development. When he was a boy, his father brought him to many exhibitions of the Dutch Golden Age painters, including Frans Hals, Rembrandt and Vermeer, and those images became infused into the internal world he began imagining as a child. He studied illustration at the AKV St. Joost in Den Bosch, graduating in 1999. While working as a freelance illustrator, Berens began to teach himself to paint in several dilapidated buildings in the rural area near his childhood home. Attempting to emulate the painting methods of the Old Masters and 19th-century academic artists like Ingres and Bouguereau, he learned by copying their work, and eventually came upon a technique which allowed him to achieve an otherworldly dreamlike impression of the qualities he admired in his predecessors. More recently, Berens relocated to Amsterdam, where he began exhibiting his work in 2004. After four sold-out shows at Amsterdam's Jaski Gallery, Berens made the move to infiltrate the American art market in 2008, at Seattle's well-known pop surrealism gallery, Roq la Rue. That sold-out show was his first exposure to American collectors, and the sudden appearance of an artist exhibiting his technical sophistication and evocative dreamlike motifs caused a sensation in pop surrealism circles. In 2009, he had his first museum retrospective, in which 13 of his paintings were exhibited at the Noordbrabants Museum in Den Bosch. In 2010, Berens was commissioned to create the cover for Blondie's album Panic of Girls. He also supplied the artwork for German singer Xavier Naidoo's 2009 album Alles kann besser werden, which features a painting called "The Big Blue." Berens has been the subject of a television documentary. Chris Berens, Master of his Magical Universe was made for Dutch broadcaster Avro’s Close Up series in 2013 and has since been broadcast several times in the Netherlands and abroad. Berens also featured prominently in the television documentary Krabbé searches for Van Gogh, in which actor/painter Jeroen Krabbé traced the path of Vincent van Gogh in co-operation with Dutch artists.

== Work ==
In his work, Berens represents an imaginary world he has been seeing since he was a child. "As a boy, I was pretty much what I am now – a dreamer... I always had this really special feeling over me... It's a feeling of another place, a warm place, deep inside me, and I fill that place with all that I see and hear." This internal universe is painted as if it is being viewed through a distorted lens, which gives the viewer a sense of peering into a secret world, inhabited by mysterious human figures from another age and a menagerie of real and fanciful animals. He told an interviewer, "I simply try to paint the world inside my head. This world has been with me since I was a child. It is populated by people and animals and is filled with landscapes, villages, cities and scenes. All kinds of things happen in this world and various stories unfold. But it's not the 'normal' world, and they are not the things that happen in the regular world."

Although his 2009 exhibition, "The Only Living Boy In New York," was inspired by the impending birth of his first child, his most frequently revisited theme is death. In paintings like "In Paradisum," "Circle of Friends," "On a Midnight Voyage" and "First Snow, Guide Me Home," he had explored various facets of the experience of dying, as he believes that there is "a great deal of beauty present in the moment of death. After witnessing the pain and struggle of dying, you also experience the lightness of acceptance and letting go." While he feels he is not yet capable of depicting what he envisions to its full potential, he says he strives to improve his skills rapidly, because he is driven to bring these visions into reality. "The reason I paint, is because for me, for now, this is the way to get closest to what I actually see. I suppose you could call it my soul, or the center of me, or my essence."

In reference to his most recent exhibition, his Seattle gallerist stated, "This new series of works, entitled "Leeuwenhart" ("Lion Heart") takes a turn from his last body of work, which depicted icicle-like skyscrapers and New York cityscapes that sparkled like diamonds, to more of a lush, fairytale world of forests, rolling green hills, and ancient looking villages. And while the usual assortment of magical animal spirits show up in all the works, another character makes an appearance, Chris' newborn daughter Emma Leeuwenhart Berens."

On occasion, Berens openly references the work of past masters like Ingres, Bouguereau, and Delaroche, because his youthful immersion in their work introduced their subjects, environments and atmosphere into his visionary universe. While these homage paintings often borrow specific elements such as costume and composition, they invariably lift their subjects into a surreal narrative that could never have been conceived by their original creators. Berens explained, "Bouguereau, Ingres, Vermeer and others, I've known by heart ever since I was a little boy... I know them. I'm safe with them. Sometimes I miss them as you can suddenly miss your childhood. So I recreate them, for comfort."

== Technique ==
Berens is notable for his unique and startlingly photorealistic painting methods, which he developed after teaching himself to paint with oils, in an attempt to emulate Old Master techniques. Although he was dissatisfied with the results he was getting with oil, he discovered that drawing inks, which remain fluid and mutable for up to two days, had a similar flexibility to oil paint. He explained, "When painting in oil, there are a lot of 'presents' you get from the medium. The way colors mix. The way the paint behaves, from your brush onto your canvas, how fast it dries, what happens if you force-dry it, etc. And oil is the medium that is closest to what I use. The amount of possible interference is at a maximum." When combined with a recent invention, plastic-coated inkjet printing paper, these fluid inks offered a new opportunity that had not been available to earlier generations of painters – an utterly smooth, semi-transparent surface designed specifically for the absorption of ink. He said, "I use plastic because it has no texture. I use the plastic on printing paper because it is extremely thin, and clever people have scratched their heads over how to keep the ink put."

Beginning with pencil sketches and then moving into inks, Berens paints many multiple versions of a figure on inkjet paper. Because the ink remains wet, he is able to work with it for some time – for example, dragging through it with a knife to create fur effects, or using a blow dryer to blur areas into soft focus. After a large number of small drawings have been completed, he chooses the portions of the figures he is satisfied with and cuts the paper into pieces, retaining the successful sections of the drawings. Peeling the paper backing off the inkjet paper, he is left with fragments of clear plastic bearing semi-transparent ink paintings. These fragments are then collaged onto board with bookbinder's glue, often six or seven layers deep, which creates an illusion of depth. He says, "I use the transparent layers because some things – such as skin, fur and light – can not be done in one layer (by me, that is). It's the same as real skin – the color and texture you see comes from all those semi-transparent layers of tones, and bumps and holes, that your mind blends into 'skin.'" Once he is satisfied with the composition, he marries the disparate elements together with ink and varnish, creating a layered assemblage which often includes hundreds of different elements. In 2011, to demonstrate this unusual technique, the artist recorded a time lapse video of the creation of his painting "Zadok the Deer."

== Publications ==
- "Mapping Infinity" (2011)
- "Ninety-Nine" (2008)
- "2239" (2008)
- "Zilver" (2006)
