= Sophia George =

Jamaican singer (born 1964)

- Born: 21 February 1964 (age 62); Kingston, Jamaica
- Occupation: Singer
- Years active: 1985–2001
- Children: 4 children, including Patrick Chung

Sophia George (born 21 February 1964) is a Jamaican singer. She is best known for her 1985 one-hit wonder hit "Girlie Girlie", which reached number one in Jamaica, topping the RJR chart for 11 weeks, and was also a Top-10 hit in the UK charting at no. 7. The song also charted at no. 3 in Argentina, no. 2 in the Netherlands, no. 20 in Germany, at no. 24 in Austria and at no. 18 in Switzerland. Her other Jamaican hits include "Lazy Body", "It Burn Mi Belly", and the duet "Ain't No Meaning"; all four songs appeared on her ten-song 1986 album, Fresh.

"Girlie Girlie" was written by Sangie Davis. At the time of its release, George was working as a teacher for hearing-impaired learners. The track was used as title music in the film Going Overboard. It was covered by Blondie on their 2011 album Panic of Girls.

A compilation album, Girlie Girlie: The Best of Sophia George, was released on Trojan Records.

George married her manager Ronald Chung, and in the mid-1990s, they relocated to Miami, later settling in Los Angeles. George is the mother of Patrick Chung (born 19 August 1987), a retired American football safety who played most of his career for the New England Patriots with whom he won three Super Bowls.

== Discography ==
- Fresh (1986), Winner
- For Everyone (1991), Pow Wow
- Steppin' Out (1994), Pow Wow
- Girlie Again (1995), Red Arrow
- Sexy Dumb Dumb (1995), Pow Wow
- Girlie Girlie (2001), Wesgram, Sire/Warner Bros. (USA)

== See also ==
- List of performances on Top of the Pops
