= Good Boys (song) =

2003 single by Blondie

Single by Blondie

from the album The Curse of Blondie
- Released: August 11, 2003
- Length: 4:18 (album version); 3:45 (radio edit)
- Label: Sanctuary; Epic
- Songwriters: Deborah Harry; Kevin Griffin; Brian May
- Producer: Jeff Bova

Blondie singles chronology
"No Exit" (1999)	"Good Boys" (2003)	"Mother" (2011)

Audio sample
- Good Boys: file; help

"Good Boys" is a song by American rock band Blondie. Issued on August 11, 2003, it was the only single released from their eighth studio album, The Curse of Blondie (2003). The single was released as part of a two-CD set and on 12-inch vinyl. CD 1 features live versions of "Maria" and "Rapture", plus the video for "Good Boys" directed by Jonas Åkerlund. CD 2 features a remix by Giorgio Moroder. The 12-inch vinyl features remixes by Giorgio Moroder, Arthur Baker, and Scissor Sisters.

"Good Boys" charted at number seven on the US Billboard Dance Club Play chart and peaked at number 12 in the United Kingdom. The Australian single release coincided with the band's 2003 tour of the country, peaking at number 37 and becoming their first top-40 hit there as a group since "Island of Lost Souls" in 1982. "Good Boys" was the final single from the band for almost eight years.

== Songwriting credits ==
Although not credited on the original single release, Brian May of the British rock band Queen was later credited as a co-writer because Debbie Harry used lyrics that were similar to those of Queen's 1977 hit "We Will Rock You" for the rap section. Although the lyrics are not entirely identical, Queen threatened to sue, as was explained by Harry and fellow Blondie member Chris Stein on a VH1 special. The lyrics used in "Good Boys" were "You got me on your face / A big disgrace / Shakin' your feathers all over the place." While the lyrics from "We Will Rock You" are "You got mud on your face / You big disgrace / Kicking your can all over the place."

== Music video ==
The music video for "Good Boys" was directed by Jonas Åkerlund. Filmed partly in black and white and partly in color, the video starts out in the style of an old silent film, with a title screen that presents the band, the song, and the director. Debbie Harry appears in a brunette wig, playing a ringmaster conducting the band in a vintage circus setting, intercut with scenes of a circus drama in which a clown is thrown inside a cage with a tiger and mauled to death. There's also a "blond" version, where Harry doesn't wear the brunette wig. Åkerlund also made an eight-minute silent short film also entitled "Good Boys" extending the clown story.

== Legacy ==
"Good Boys" has been ranked among Blondie's greatest songs by publications including Billboard, Classic Pop magazine, and The Guardian. Ashley Zlatopolsky, writing in a 2017 Billboard retrospective, deemed the song "perhaps Blondie's most overshadowed single" that got "lost in the shuffle of their later career", complimenting both the lyrics and the music video. In a ranking of the best Blondie songs for The Guardian, critic Alexis Petridis called it "the great lost Blondie single" with particular praise going to the chorus and the bassline. Classic Pop writer Jacob Wilson called the song "a forgotten high" and commended both the music video and the Giorgio Moroder remixes included on the CD single. Both Zlatopolsky and Petridis speculated that the song would have been a hit if released in an earlier decade.

=== Rankings ===
Publication	List	Rank
Billboard	"Blondie's 10 Greatest Songs: Critic's Picks"	9
Classic Pop	"Top 20 Blondie songs"	19
The Guardian	"Blondie's 20 greatest songs – ranked!"	16

== Track listings ==
All tracks were written by Deborah Harry, Kevin Griffin, and Brian May unless otherwise noted.

UK 12-inch single

A1. "Good Boys" (Giorgio Moroder extended long) – 7:07
B1. "Good Boys" (Scissor Sisters' Gyad Byas Myax Ya mix) – 3:40
B2. "Good Boys" (Return to New York mix) – 8:22

UK CD1

1. "Good Boys" (album version) – 4:18
2. "Maria" (live) (Jimmy Destri) – 4:49
3. "Rapture (live) (Harry, Chris Stein) – 6:24
4. "Good Boys" (video—B&W version with color) – 3:47

UK CD2

1. "Good Boys" (album version) – 4:18
2. "Good Boys" (Giorgio Moroder extended long) – 7:07

European CD single

1. "Good Boys" (album version) – 4:18
2. "Good Boys" (Giorgio Moroder extended long) – 7:07
3. "Good Boys" (Scissor Sisters' Gyad Byas Myax Ya mix) – 3:40
4. "Good Boys" (Return to New York mix) – 8:22

Australian CD single

1. "Good Boys" (album version) – 4:18
2. "Good Boys" (Giorgio Moroder single mix) – 4:06
3. "Good Boys" (Dead Guy's Ghost remix) – 7:14
4. "Good Boys" (Scissor Sisters' Gyad Byas Myax Ya mix extended) – 5:15

== Charts ==
Chart (2003–2004)	Peak position
Australia (ARIA)	37
Germany (GfK)	93
Scotland Singles (OCC)	12
UK Singles (OCC)	12
US Dance Club Songs (Billboard) Remixes	7

== Release history ==
Region	Date	Format(s)	Label(s)	Ref(s).
Australia	August 11, 2003	CD	Epic	
United Kingdom	October 6, 2003	12-inch vinyl; CD	Epic	
United States	February 9, 2004	Hot adult contemporary radio	Sanctuary	
