= Johnny Dynell =

American record producer, DJ

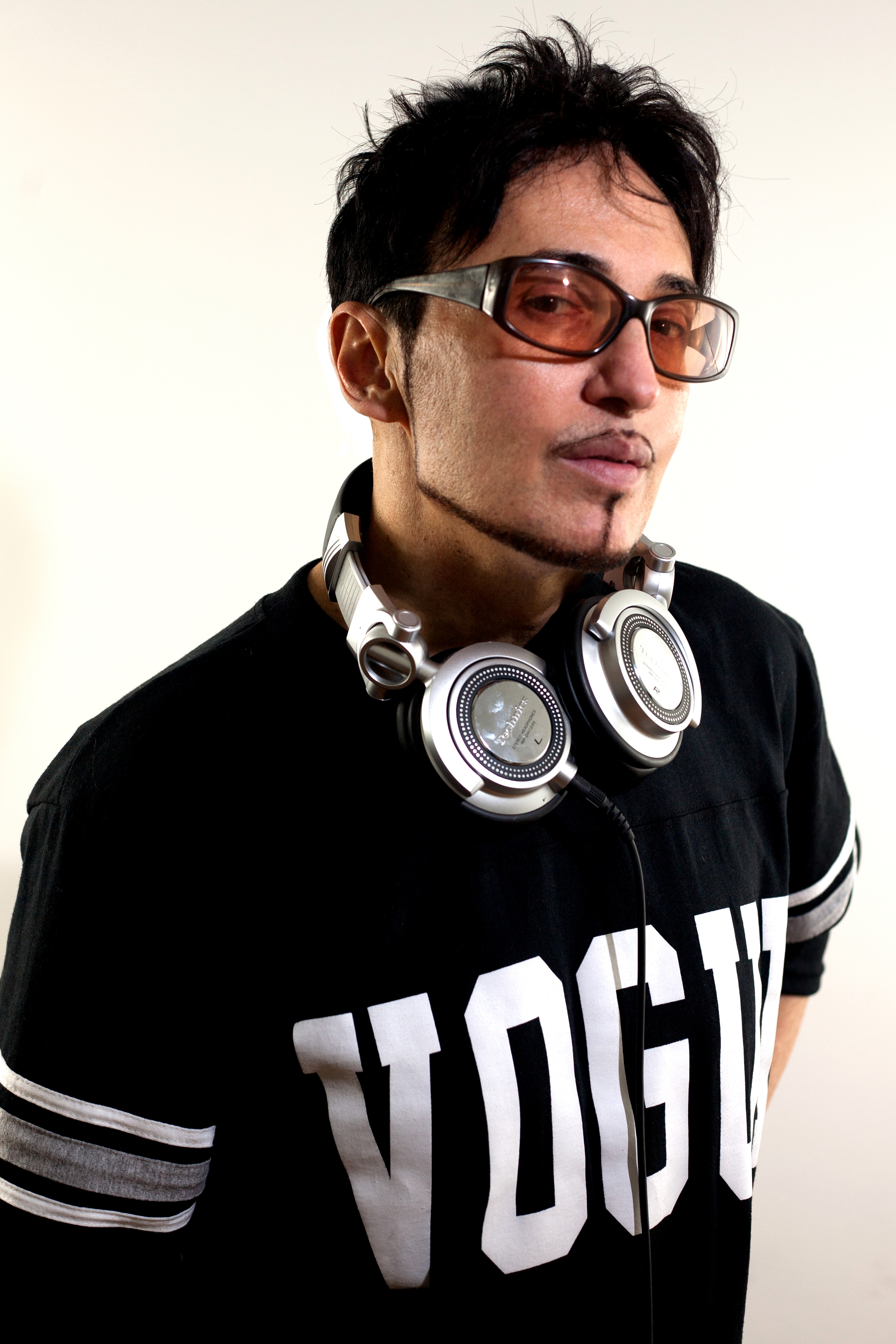

Background information
- Birth name: John Savas
- Genres: House Music, World Music
- Occupation(s): DJ, record producer, recording artist, remixer, nightclub promoter
- Years active: 1980–present
- Website: www.johnnydynell.com

Johnny Dynell (born John Savas) is a New York City DJ, record producer, recording artist, remixer, nightclub promoter, and nightlife impresario.

== Club DJ ==
Dynell started his DJ career at the Mudd Club in 1980 and has been a resident DJ at influential New York City clubs for over three decades including The Pyramid Club, Danceteria, The Roxy, The Limelight, Area, The Tunnel, Susanne Bartsch parties, Jackie 60, Crobar, Mr. Black, Greenhouse, Marquee, The Copacabana, The Monster, The Ice Palace (Fire Island), Daniel Nardicio parties and Club Cumming.

== Nightlife promoter and club owner ==
In 1990 Dynell, along with others, founded the performance club Jackie 60, a center of New York art club performance. In 1996, Dynell and Valenti took over full-time operation of the venue that housed Jackie 60, renaming the club Mother. The venue, designed by Dynell, also housed Click + Drag, a “cyber-fetish-gothic weekly” and New York City's first weekly vampire themed club, Long Black Veil. Mother closed in June, 2000.

== Music recording career ==
Johnny Dynell's first single "Jam Hot" (Acme Records, 1983) became a cult classic and has been remixed and sampled many times over. In 1990 Norman Cook aka Fatboy Slim and his group Beats International released "Dub Be Good to Me" which sampled the "Jam Hot" rap "tank fly boss walk jam nitty gritty/ you're listening to the boy from the big bad city, this is Jam Hot, this is Jam Hot". The song was the seventh best-selling single of 1990 in the UK, reached #1 on the U.S. Billboard Hot Dance Club Play chart and #76 on the Billboard Hot 100. In 2010 a remix project on Smash Hit Music included re-workings by Tensnake, Peter Rauhofer, Ilija Rudman, Clouded Vision, 40 Thieves and the song's original producer Mark Kamins. As a recording artist Dynell has also been released on Atlantic Records, Arista Records, Epic Records, Heinz Records, Tribal Records, GIG Records, Xtravaganza Records, Pow Wow Records, Warlock Records and his own label Endless Night Music since 2011.

Dynell, a longtime member of the House of Xtravaganza, helped to introduce to the culture at large the "voguing" dance form with his 1989 release "Elements of Vogue", performed by MC David Ian Xtravaganza, a co-writer of the song with Dynell and David DePino.

As a songwriter, Dynell has also collaborated with Malcolm McLaren and Pink Martini on "Una Notte a Napoli" and "Segundo".

== Selected discography ==
Year	Title	Artist	Label	Notes
1983	"Jam Hot"	Johnny Dynell & New York 88	ACME Music Corp.	Writer: Johnny Dynell, Producers: Mark Kamins, Kenton Nix
1983	"The Big Throwdown"	Johnny Dynell & New York 88	ACME Music Corp.	Writer: Johnny Dynell, Producers: Mark Kamins, Kenton Nix
1986	"Rhythm of Love"	Johnny Dynell	Pow Wow Records	Writer: Johnny Dynell, Producer: Mark Kamins
1986	"Rhythm of Love Remix"	Johnny Dynell	Pow Wow Records	Writer: Johnny Dynell, Producer: Mark Kamins, Remixer: Larry Levan
1988	"Jam Hot Money"	Johnny Dynell & New York 88	GIG Records	Writer: Johnny Dynell, Remixer: Junior Vasquez
1989	"Elements of Vogue"	David Ian Xtravaganza	Extravaganza Records	Writers: Johnny Dynell, David Ian Xtravaganza, Producers: Johnny Dynell, David DePino
1990	“Say Yeah”	Slammin’ The Rock	Warlock Records, 4th & Broadway, Island Records	Writer: Johnny Dynell, Producer: Johnny Dynell
1991	"Love Find A Way"	Johnny Dynell	Atlantic	Writer: Johnny Dynell, Producer: Arthur Baker
1991	"Love Find A Way Remixes"	Johnny Dynell	Atlantic	Writer: Johnny Dynell, Remixer: David Morales
1991	"Jan Hot Remixes"	Johnny Dynell	Atlantic	Writer: Johnny Dynell, Remixer Markus Moser
1992	"The Jackie Hustle"	Jackie MC's	Arista, Minimal, BMG, Maxi	Writers: Arthur Baker, Lati Kronlund, Paul Alexander, Richard Move, Producer: Arthur Baker, Lati Kronlund, Remixer: Danny Tenaglia, Johnny Dynell
1995	“Feel The Vibe”	Jack-E-Makosa	Criminal Records, Minimal Records	Writer: Arthur Baker, Producer: Arthur Baker, Remixer: Johnny Dynell
1996	"Riding Into Battle With Her High Heels On"	Johnny Dynell	TRIBAL America	Writers: Johnny Dynell, Eric Kupper, Producer: Peter Rauhofer
2004	"Una Notte A Napoli"	Pink Martini	Heinz Records	Writers: Thomas Lauderdale, China Forbes, Alba Clemente, Johnny Dynell
2010	“Jam Hot / Big Throwdown Remixes”	Johnny Dynell	Smash Hit Music	Writer: Johny Dynell, Remixers: Tensnake, Peter Rauhofer, Mark Kamins, Clouded Vision, Ilija Rudman, 4o Thieves
2011	“Bring It!”	Sade Pendavis and Paul Alexander	Endless Night Music	Writer: Johny Dynell, Producer: Johnny Dynell
2011	"Una Notte A Napoli Remix"	Pink Martini	Heinz Records	Writers: Thomas Lauderdale, China Forbes, Alba Clemente, Johnny Dynell, Remixer: Johnny Dynell
2012	"Runway"	Johny Dynell	Endless Night Music	Writer: Johny Dynell, Producer: Johnny Dynell
2012	"Elements of Vogue Remixes"	David Ian Xtravaganza	Endless Night Music	Writers: Johnny Dynell, David Ian Xtravaganza, Producers: Johnny Dynell, David DePino, Remixer: Johnny Dynell
2013	“Bitch U Better Don't”	Jamil Labeija	Endless Night Music	Writer: Johny Dynell, Producer: Johnny Dynell
2013	“U Been Chopped”	Jamil Labeija	Endless Night Music	Writer: Johny Dynell, Producer: Johnny Dynell
2014	"Tank Fly Boss walk"	Johnny Dynell	Endless Night Music	Writer: Johny Dynell, Producer: Johnny Dynell
2016	"Segundo"	Pink Martini	Heinz Records	Writers: Johnny Dynell, Thomas Lauderdale, China Forbes
2017	"The World Of Tomorrow"	Johnny Dynell	Trax Records	Writer: Johny Dynell, Producer: Johnny Dynell
