= Creative Impulse Entertainment =

Media production company

- Company type: Private
- Industry: Mass media
- Founder: Jan Lucanus
- Headquarters: New York City, NY, United States
- Number of locations: New York City, NY, Hollywood, California
- Area served: Worldwide
- Key people: Jan Lucanus (President & CEO), Jan C. Childress (EIC), Andrew Vannata (VP)
- Products: Comic books & graphic novel publishing, film & video, music video & commercial, and animation production, music production & scoring, game art production
- Services: intellectual property development, transmedia production, consulting
- Subsidiaries: Creative Impulse Publishing, Creative Impulse Films, Creative Impulse Music, Creative Impulse Alliance
- Website: www.creativeimpulseent.com

Creative Impulse Entertainment (also known as Creative Impulse and CIE) is a transmedia production company founded by Jan Lucanus in 2003. With the company mantra "Intrigue, Entertain, Inspire Social Change", CIE bills itself as a home for artists that create content across multiple forms of media. CIE's production portfolio encompasses comic books (collectively referred to as the Creative Impulse Universe), film, video, animation, music, and games, with subsidiaries dedicated to each craft (Creative Impulse Publishing, Creative Impulse Films, Creative Impulse Music, and work for hire production and consulting services through Creative Impulse Alliance).

== CIE's Flagship Property ==
CIE is most well known for the mixed martial arts entertainment property, JFH: Justice For Hire, which utilizes comic books, live action film and video, animations, and music to deliver its story. The "JFH" story follows two sons of a duo of vigilante fathers that get their hero-for-hire business legalized, spawning an industry of copycats and competitors dubbed the Retribution Industry. What started as a series of student films JFH creator Jan Lucanus was producing from his high school and college days at the New York Film Academy and New York University grew into expanded short films and an award-winning "Justice-For-Hire" 47-minute Featurette that doubled as both CIE's second narrative production and Jan's NYU senior thesis film. The same footage from the featurette was recut into shorter episodic content, placed on four DVDs, and bundled with issues 1-4 of the "JFH: Justice-For-Hire" comic book series, marking the first time in the history of the comic book industry in which a physical comic book and DVD combination package was sold for an entire series run.

The "JFH" digital comic books spent nine consecutive weeks on the Top 25 Action/Adventure Downloads List and twelve consecutive weeks as the number one ranked Martial Arts Genre Download on comiXology's Top 25 List. "JFH", along with all of Creative Impulse Publishing's first wave of titles, remained on the Top 25 Martial Arts Downloads List until comiXology updated the platform's user interface in 2012, removing the Top 25 listings by genre completely. ComiXology remains the leading digital comic service in the industry. With digital distribution on all mobile and desktop devices via partnerships with comiXology, Graphic.ly, iVerse Media, and other digital distributors, "JFH" is one of the most downloaded martial arts comic book series on any digital comics platform.

Announced at the 2012 San Diego Comic-Con Superhero Kung Fu Extravaganza, the live-action adaptation of JFH: Justice-For-Hire is slated for production via a partnership between Creative Impulse Entertainment and the Canadian-based Spillwall Productions.

In 2013, the JFH creative team launched a successful Kickstarter campaign to shoot a short film to establish the cinematic tone for the JFH feature, as well as test out a martial arts camera system designed for the film, called "Weapon Camera Movement". The short, entitled JFH: Retribution Task Force, brings together several characters across the JFH Universe for a common goal - stopping acts of violence against women committed by the Raskol gangs of Papua New Guinea. The short premiered at San Diego Comic-Con in 2014, where co-director Jan Lucanus announced a social engagement campaign that will bring together fans, creators, and cast for the upcoming "JFH" feature film.

== Transmedia Intellectual Property Development ==
CIE has established itself as a developer of intellectual properties designed to exist in several forms of media that use the comic book format as a foundation. In addition to developing narrative projects for the Clinton Foundation's Clinton Global Initiative (CGI) and Universal Music Group, CIE controls over 50 intellectual properties across multiple genres.
