= Ken Goldstein =

American musician (born 1969)

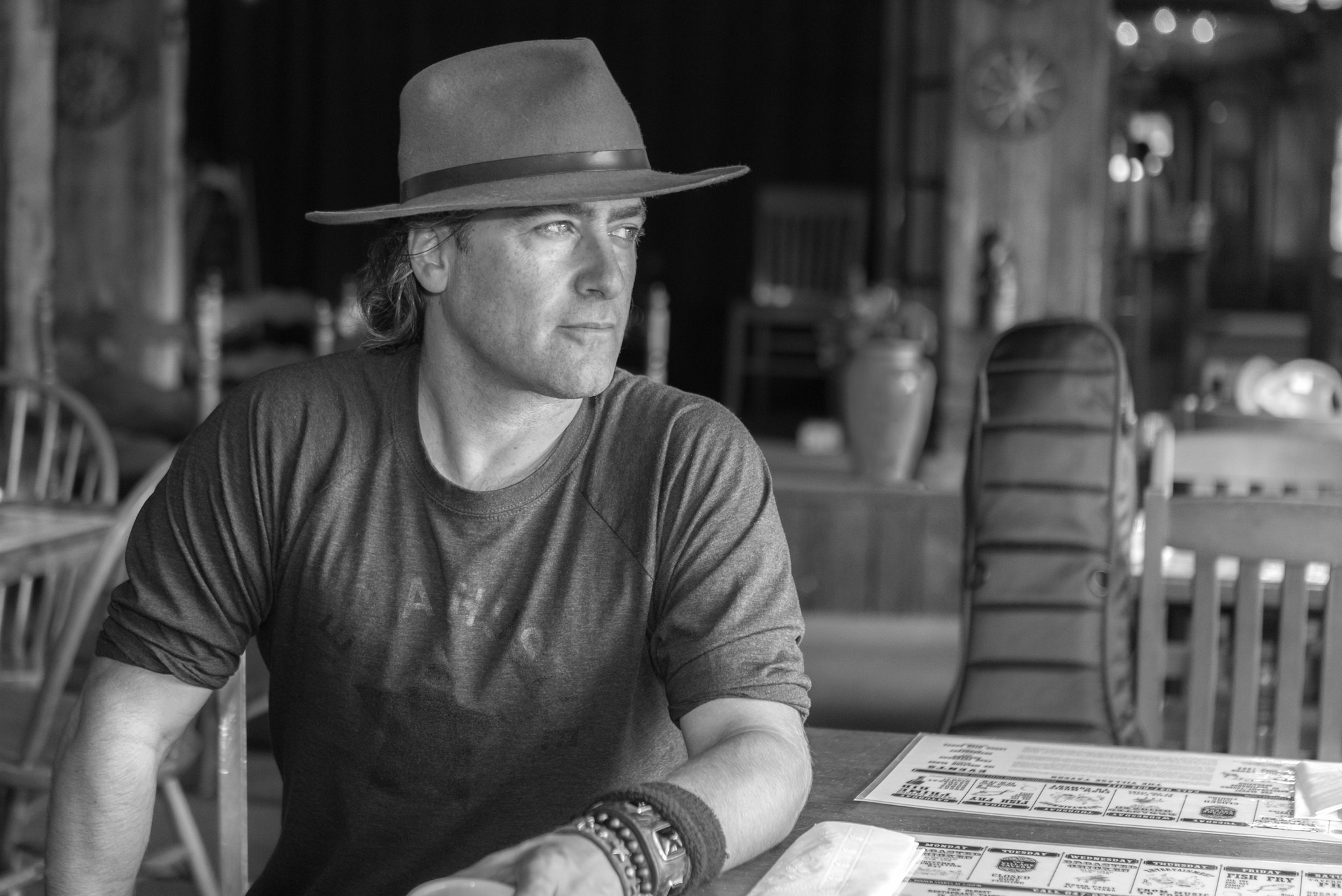
- Goldstein circa 2017
- Born: June 24, 1969 (age 57); Chicago, Illinois
- Education: Syracuse University
- Occupation: Chief Marketing Officer
- Years active: 1985–present
- Employer: The Six Shooter Company
- Known for: (book series) The Way of the Nerd, (musician) Jack Dempsey
- Notable work: (book) The Way of the Nerd: Practical Advice for Impractical People
- Website: www.thewayofthenerd.com

Ken Goldstein (born June 1969), also known as Kene G and Jack Dempsey, is an American musician, film and television writer, producer, director and occasional actor. He is a co-founder of Planet illogica and CEO of The Six Shooter Company and the author of the book series, The Way of the Nerd. Goldstein is an active speaker at conferences and festivals, universities and private and public institutions. He has been a featured and Keynote speaker in Brazil, Australia, France and Germany. He is also a songwriter, guitar player, performer and recording artist who often performs under the stage name Jack Dempsey. In 2014 Ken Goldstein completed his first solo album as Jack Dempsey at Capitol Records. The album was produced and engineered by Niko Bolas.

== Early life and education ==
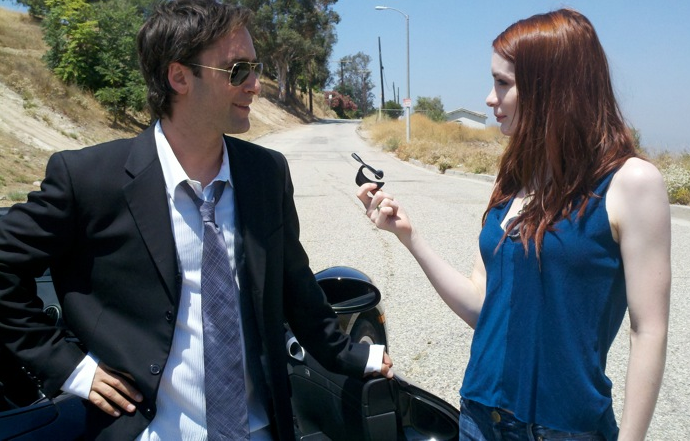
Goldstein with actress Felicia Day of The Guild

Goldstein grew up in Northbrook, Illinois, the town formerly called, Shermerville, Illinois, which is the setting for several of the classic films of the late director, John Hughes, who attended Northbrook's Glenbrook North High School (the setting of the town and High School in Ferris Bueller's Day Off, Sixteen Candles and Breakfast Club). Goldstein can be briefly seen in the film, Ferris Bueller's Day Off and Sixteen Candles, as all of the classic Hughes' films were shot during the years he attended Glenbrook North High School and utilized students as featured extras. A chance encounter with John Hughes in 1987, during which Goldstein and Hughes performed the song, "Good Love", in front of a gymnasium filled with students, foreshadowed his employment as Hughes' personal and creative assistant during the pre-production of Home Alone 2 and throughout the production of the film.

As a teen he attended the London School of Dramatic Arts and the Art Institute of Chicago before graduating from Syracuse University in 1990.

He is the grandson of Cecilia Dubin, the Russian concert pianist.

== Media career ==
Goldstein was a photojournalist for the New York New Times in the late 1980s, a writer for the Chicago Tribune in the early 1990s, and a television news commentator and field reporter for Fox News and NBC, including the on-air host of Too Much Information, a television news magazine for Fox News in Chicago. He also wrote, directed and produced television for A&E Network, The History Channel, BET, TF-1, BBC, PBS, Fox Broadcasting Company and NBC. Goldstein co-produced, directed and edited the several documentary specials including The Angel of Bergen-Belsen and "Copycat Crimes", which were released by A&E Network, and received an Emmy from the Chicago Chapter of the National Academy of Television Arts and Sciences for his production of the children’s television program There’s No Such Thing as a Chanukah Bush, Sandy Goldstein, in 1995.

In 2011, he became the bureau chief for Wizard Magazine's "Games, Girls, Gadgets and Gear" and Wizard World Comic Cons. His column, "State of the Game", appears weekly in Wizard World magazine. On April 29 he celebrated the launch of the speaking tour for his book, "The Way of the Nerd: Practical Advice for Impractical People," at the 2011 Anaheim Comic Con

== The Way of the Nerd series and other books ==
Ken Goldstein has said that the first book in his ten part series The Way of the Nerd: Practical Advice for Impractical People has been in the works for twenty years but took only twenty hours to write. The book was completed in the Spring of 2011. An early draft of the book leaked onto the internet in July 2011 and became a popular internet download. The book, which is available in retail stores as well as on-line vendors, is also the subject of Goldstein's lecture series, The Day of the Nerd.

Goldstein is currently writing the second book in the series, The Way of the Nerd: Actually I am Going to Tell You What to do with Your Life, which is set to be released in hard back and ebook formats in October 2012.

Though all of the books in this series are based on the writings of Lao Tzu and his titular work Tao Te Ching each book incorporates a wide variety of spiritual teachings from Kabbalah, Catholicism, Judaism, Sufism and Muslim.

In July 2012 Huqua Press released The Oprah Effect which features a foreword by Ken Goldstein.

== Planet illogica ==
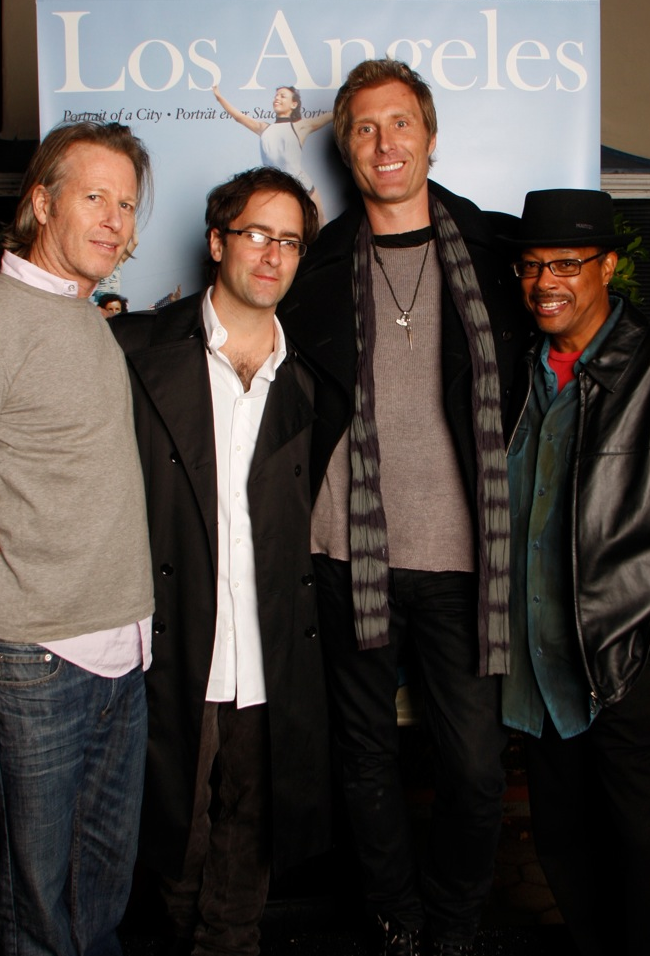
Stephen Nemeth, Ken Goldstein, Tonny Sorensen and Bob Johnson (the principals of Planet illogica) at the Taschen Vanity Fair-Planet illogica kick-off, December 2009

Ken Goldstein co-founded Planet illogica, an agency and an online creative community for artists and art organizations. The site launched in beta July 2009 with the help of the American Film Institute’s Digital Content Lab. During his tenure with Planet illogica Goldstein was the CMO (Chief Marketing Officer) and oversaw all marketing, promotion and branding efforts.

Examples of Planet illogica's marketing support of its artists in residence include their South by Southwest art exhibit of American contemporary artist Ron English’s Historic KISS art and other music-related prints, its online sale and promotion of custom limited edition apparel from English’s Popaganda collection, the brokering of Ron English art into the video game, inFamous on the PS3 and co-Producing Ron's 2010 retrospect, Status Factory.

Another project was Infiltrate, an art installation touring the University of Utah, George Washington University, and the University of Florida, among other campuses., that Planet illogica produced for Disney Nature and Participant Media, as an educational and promotional vehicle for the film, Oceans.

Planet illogica's roots were established in the Artists in Residence (AiR) program, also co-founded by Ken Goldstein and Tonny Sorensen, and incubated within the Von Dutch company. The inaugural AiR event was held at Von Dutch headquarters in Los Angeles, CA on September 27, 2007, and was a launch event for the mixed martial arts comic book JFH: Justice For Hire, created by the first AiR-sponsored artist, Jan Lucanus, who later became the first Planet illogica artist. "Justice-For-Hire Presents Fight Night at the Von Dutch" drew a crowd of 1,100 spectators as they were presented with martial arts demonstrations and exhibition fights from Jan and his "JFH" fight team members, including champion fighters Maximillion Chen, Ahmed Best, and Brazilian Jiu-Jitsu Master John Machado, along with Jan's father, veteran comic book writer and tai chi Master Jan C. Childress. Other performances included an Oprah Winfrey-sponsored choir and acrobatics from Cirque du Soleil troop, REALIS. Celebrities in attendance included Seth Green, Lea Thompson, as well as a slew of martial arts masters from across California.

Planet illogica also developed and produced multi-media projects including movies, television shows, books and albums. Projects include organist Christoph Bull's "First & Grand", the first classical organ record ever recorded at the Walt Disney Concert Hall in Los Angeles, and Climate Refugees documentary film.
