= The Facts in the Case of Mister Hollow =

The Facts In the Case of Mister Hollow
- Directed by: Rodrigo Gudiño, Vincent Marcone
- Written by: Rodrigo Gudiño
- Produced by: Brenton Bentz, Rodrigo Gudiño, Marco Pecota
- Starring: Julian Richings, Alan Alderton, Lea Lawrynowicz
- Cinematography: Walter Pacifico
- Edited by: Tomasz Dysinski, Vincent Marcone, Cole Sullivan
- Music by: Johnny Hollow
- Production company: Someone At The Door Productions
- Distributed by: Rue Morgue
- Release date: July 17, 2008
- Running time: 6 minutes
- Country: Canada

The Facts In the Case of Mister Hollow is a 2008 Short horror film that was directed by Rodrigo Gudiño and Vincent Marcone, based upon a story written by Gudiño. The short was first released on July 17, 2008, at the Fantasia Film Festival and has been re-released as part of several different DVDs, either as an extra feature or as one of several featured shorts.

== Synopsis ==
The film opens with a brief pan over several papers, one of which shows a symbol resembling the Caduceus but with bat wings and the one word question "Keres"? The film then shows a news clipping with a headline that states that a child has disappeared and is believed to be one of an estimated 100 victims. A by-line shown in the same clipping mentions that paganism is currently flourishing in northern Ontario.

Along with the clipping is a note that comments that enclosed with the clipping is a photograph and that the reader should look closely at it. The photo initially shows four adults, three men and one woman, standing in a forest with a house looming at their back and a car on their left. The woman is holding an infant and initially nothing seems odd about the photo.

The majority of the film follows, as the camera zooms in and pans across the photo repeatedly. With each pass of the camera, details of the scene shift and become more sinister: some are merely points of interest that could easily be missed, such as markings on the hands of the three adult males, a car mirror showing blood spatters and a body in the car's back seat, and crosses nailed to trees. Others are more obvious, such as one of the men beginning to light a fire made up of several crucifixes.

Eventually the photo reveals two additional people in the background, two priests holding a shotgun that appears to be ready to fire upon the group. As the short concludes it becomes apparent that the woman is not there of her own volition—her expression having become horrified in the most recent examination—and the film ends with the revelation that there is a final person in the image, a cloaked and menacing figure reflected in the sunglasses worn by one of the men.

== Cast ==
- Julian Richings as Kneeling Man
- Alan Alderton as Waving Man
- Lea Lawrynowicz as Young Woman
- Tony Morrone as Thin Man
- Darryl Dougherty as Young Priest
- Rogelio Gudiño as Old Priest
- Behnaz Siahpustan as Ker

== Release history ==
The Facts In the Case of Mister Hollow had its world premiere at the 2008 Fantasia Film Festival and has also screened at several other film festivals such as the Toronto After Dark Film Festival. The short has been released as part of two DVDs, as one of the featured shorts in the 2009 film short collection Curious Stories, Crooked Symbols and as a DVD extra for the 2013 release of Gudiño's The Last Will and Testament of Rosalind Leigh.

== Reception ==
Critical reception for The Facts In the Case of Mister Hollow has been mostly positive. Bloody Disgusting reviewed the short as part of the DVD for The Last Will and Testament of Rosalind Leigh and praised it as "a creepy look at the chaotic nature of everything that can happen during that one millisecond of time" when a photograph has been taken. Shock Till You Drop and Dread Central both gave positive reviews, with Dread Central commenting that although the concept didn't sound like it "[would] be able to hold up for very long", the film's length worked in the short's favor and upon viewing the film multiple times, they kept noticing more details that they had initially missed.

=== Awards ===
- Best Animated Short Film at the Fantasia Film Festival (2008, winner)
- Best Animated Short at the Sitges International Film Festival (2008, winner)
- Best Short at the Puchon International Fantastic Film Festival (2008, winner)
- Best Short at the Shnit international shortfilmfestival (2008, winner)
- Best Animated Short at the South African Horror Fest (2008, winner)
- Best Short at the Shnit Short Film Festival (2008, winner)
