= 白 (disambiguation) =

白 is Kangxi Radical 106.

白 may also refer to:

- Bai (surname), Chinese surname
- Baek, Korean surname
- Bai people, ethnic group in China
- Shiro, Japanese kun'yomi reading

== See also ==
- White, the literal meaning of this character
