= Kenneth Goldstein =

Kenneth Goldstein may refer to:

- Ken Goldstein (born 1969), American film and television writer, producer and director
- Kenneth S. Goldstein (1927–1995), American folklorist, educator, record producer
