= Rascal =

Rascal or rascals may refer to:

== Arts and entertainment ==
=== Film ===
- Rascal (film), a 1969 Walt Disney adaptation of Sterling North's book
- Rascals (1938 film), an American comedy-drama
- Rascals (2011 film), an Indian action-comedy film
- "Rascals" (Star Trek: The Next Generation)

=== Music ===
- Dizzee Rascal (born 1984), English rapper
- The Rascals (English band), a rock band from the Hoylake, England
- The Rascals, an American blue-eyed soul group
- The Rascals (producers), a music production duo
- "Rascal" (song), 2020
- "Rascal (Superstar)", a song by Tinashe

=== Other ===
- Rascal (book), a 1963 children's book by Sterling North
- Rascal (video game), a 1998 game for the Sony PlayStation

== Military uses ==
- Rascal (artillery), a lightweight mobile artillery system
- GAM-63 RASCAL, a supersonic air-to-surface missile
- UH-60A RASCAL, a special-purpose Sikorsky UH-60 Black Hawk helicopter

== Technology ==
- Rascal (single-board computer), small open source computer that runs Linux
- RascalMPL, an experimental domain-specific language for metaprogramming
- Rascal 14, an American sailboat design
- The Rascal Company, maker of a brand of mobility scooter

== Other uses ==
- River City Rascals, a professional baseball team based in O'Fallon, Missouri
- Bedford Rascal, a GM/Suzuki microvan

== See also ==
- The Little Rascals (disambiguation)
- Rascalz, Canadian hip hop group
- The Rascalz, professional wrestling stable
- Raskol gangs, urban gangs in Papua New Guinea
- RASCLS
