= JFH =

JFH may refer to:

- JFH: Justice For Hire
- Jimmy Floyd Hasselbaink
- Joint Force Harrier
