= Shero =

Shero may refer to:

- Ray Shero (1962–2025), American ice hockey executive
- Shero (album), a 2010 album by S.H.E
- Shero (TV series), a 2023 Singaporean action drama series
- sHERO, earlier name for German band Fräulein Wunder
- Shero, from the cartoon Shinchan, a furry, intelligent, fictional dog, which accompanies the main character in the T.V series.

== See also ==
- Heroine
- Shiro (disambiguation)
- Shero (TV series)
