= JFH: Justice For Hire =

- JFH: Justice For Hire #1 (December 2007) showing Ebony, Louisa, and Ivory after a brawl with goons. Cover art by Chadwick Coleman and David Duong.

Group publication information
- Publisher: Creative Impulse Publishing
- First appearance: "Ebony & Ivory" short film (December 2001)
- Created by: Jan Lucanus; Jan C. Childress

In-story information
- Type of organisation: Team
- Base(s): Chinatown, Manhattan; Freedom Tower
- Agent(s): Ebony, Ivory, Louisa Mendez, Original Ebony, Original Ivory, Anita Bennett, Utada Otomo, Sharique Chandra, Jacques

JFH: Justice For Hire
- JFH: Justice For Hire Season 1 Collected Edition Graphic Novel (July 2011). Cover art by Tariq Raheem.

Series publication information
- Schedule: Bi-monthly (issues 1-4), Semi-monthly (issue 0)
- Format: Ongoing series
- Genre: Martial Arts, Action/Adventure, Crime/Thriller
- Publication date: (Vol. 1); Dec. 2007 – Dec. 2009 (Vol. 2); Apr. 2012 – present
- Number of issues: (Vol. 1): 4 (plus special editions) (Vol. 2): 1 (ongoing)

Creative team
- Writer(s): (Vol. 1); Jan C. Childress, Jan Lucanus, Mercer Boffey, Banyan Williamson-Masuda (Vol. 2); Jan Lucanus, Jan C. Childress
- Artist(s): Antonio Rojo, PUSTE, Sivakami Mohan, Chadwick Coleman, Tariq Raheem
- Penciller(s): (Vol. 1) Antonio Rojo (Vol. 2) Antonio Rojo
- Inker(s): (Vol. 1) Rick Bonilla, Antonio Garovillo (Vol. 2) PUSTE
- Colorist(s): (Vol. 1); Veronica Rosado, Mike Toolan, Sivakami Mohan (Vol. 2); Sivakami Mohan
- Creator(s): Jan Lucanus; Jan C. Childress

JFH: Justice For Hire (also known as JFH, Justice For Hire, and JFH: Justice-For-Hire) is a mixed martial arts themed entertainment property that encompasses a series of comic books, films, videos, music, and animations. The JFH story follows two sons of a duo of vigilante fathers who get their family's hero-for-hire business legalized, spawning a worldwide industry of heroes, villains, and mercenaries for hire dubbed the Retribution Industry. Produced and published by Creative Impulse Entertainment, JFH remains one of the first examples of transmedia storytelling in the comic book industry.

JFH was created by real-life father/son martial arts champions and comic book writers Jan C. Childress and Jan Lucanus. Lucanus appears as a regular cast member in the live action content.

== Comic book history ==
As explained in an interview with Kodak's "In Camera" magazine, what started as a series of student films Jan Lucanus was directing from his high school and college days at the New York Film Academy and New York University grew into expanded short films and an award winning "Justice-For-Hire" 47-minute Featurette that doubled as both Jan's company Creative Impulse Entertainment's second narrative production and his NYU senior thesis film. The same footage from the featurette was recut into shorter episodic content, placed on four DVDs, and bundled with issues 1-4 of the "JFH: Justice-For-Hire" comic book series, marking the first time in the history of the comic book industry in which a physical comic book and DVD combination package was sold for an entire series run.

=== Launch ===
In 2007, JFH co-creator Jan Lucanus took an independent approach to spreading the word about his new comic series, doing a pre-release print run that debuted at the New York Comic Con, and calling upon his contacts in the martial arts community and across media to get the comics to people outside of the traditional comic book audience (the print comic book industry was notorious for marketing only to comic book readers, rather than targeting audiences outside of the niche market). "JFH" comics were given away in martial arts contests and at events for Warner Bros. Records, VH1, and Adidas. Later that year, marketing guru Ken Goldstein and entrepreneur Tonny Sorenson, along with partner Bob Johnson, made Jan the first Artist-in-Residence (AiR) within their lifestyle brand, Von Dutch (the AiR program later transformed into the Planet Illogica agency). Before the official market release, "JFH" comics were distributed within the SoHo, New York, and Los Angeles, California Von Dutch store fronts. On September 27, 2007, Jan co-hosted the Von Dutch-sponsored launch event for the "JFH" comic book - "Justice-For-Hire Presents Fight Night at the Von Dutch" in Los Angeles, CA. Gift bags filled with "JFH" comics and other sponsored items were given to a crowd of 1,100 spectators as they were presented with martial arts demonstrations and exhibition fights from Jan and his "JFH" fight team members, including champion fighters Hinton Wells, Ian Morgan, Maximillion Chen, Gabe Dorado, Ahmed Best, Jesse Abrescy, and Brazilian Jiu-Jitsu Master John Machado, along with Jan's father Jan C. Childress and creative partner Mercer Boffey. Other performances included an Oprah Winfrey-sponsored choir, and acrobatics from Cirque du Soleil troop, REALIS. Sponsors included Hollywood's Golden Apple Comics shop, Inside Kung Fu Magazine, Black Belt (magazine), Alacer Corp. (Emergen-C), 97.1 Free FM (now KNX-FM), and martial arts promoter Tim Stell, among others. Celebrities in attendance included Seth Green, Lea Thompson, as well as a slew of martial arts masters from across California.

=== Print distribution and reviews ===
A year of independent promotions and the non-traditional packaging of comics & DVD's landed Jan's small, newly formed publishing subsidiary, Creative Impulse Publishing, a vendor deal with Diamond Comics Distributors, the worldwide monopoly for printed comics distribution. Creative Impulse Publishing officially released of the first issue of the printed "JFH" comic book/DVD bundles to comic shops internationally on December 26, 2007., and ran a bi-monthly release schedule into June 2008 to critical acclaim. The "JFH" comic book received 4 out of 4 stars from Newsarama.com, which reviewed the book as "cinematic genius on the printed page...some of the most realistic kung-fu sequences ever drawn for a comic book". The live action DVD content received positive reviews from several media outlets including TheComicBookPage.com podcast, which is quoted, "the [live action] content was excellent. The basic premise for the series...absolutely brilliant" However, the concept of "JFH"'s Retribution Industry has also been criticized by several media outlets including Comics Forge, "Overall because of the moral ambiguity in the story lines, I am going to rate this 4 of 5, technically excellent, but morally questionable", and Geeksmash.com, "When all you need is money to get rid of a problem, the team could easily degrade into hit-men to the highest bidder. I don’t know if the creators are as concerned with these thematic messages as much as they simply want to put out a cool, tough fighting book".

=== Digital comics ===
After the initial "JFH" print release, Creative Impulse Entertainment was approached by comiXology to produce a "JFH" iPhone app that carried both the comic and the live action video. ComiXology was concurrently developing a new digital comics service and was seeking indie publishers to release their comics digitally and prove the viability of the digital comics business to larger publishers. ComiXology launched the Comics App in July 2009 with "JFH: Justice-For-Hire" as one of the launch titles. The "JFH" digital comic books spent nine consecutive weeks on the Top 25 Action/Adventure Downloads List and twelve consecutive weeks as the number one ranked Martial Arts Genre Download on comiXology's Top 25 List. "JFH", along with all of Creative Impulse Publishing's first wave of titles, remained on the Top 25 Martial Arts Downloads List until comiXology updated the platform's user interface in 2012, removing the Top 25 listings by genre completely. ComiXology remains the leading digital comic service in the industry. With digital distribution on all mobile and desktop devices via partnerships with comiXology, Graphic.ly, iVerse Media, and other digital distributors, "JFH" is one of the most downloaded martial arts comic book series on any digital comics platform.

== Motion comic animations ==
Creative Impulse Entertainment partnered with Willow Road Animation to adapt the JFH comic book series into a motion comic animation. The pilot episode, directed by Jan Lucanus, was launched in February 2012 during the "JFH FreeFor All" Event with digital comic network Graphicly, media outlet iFanboy, and animation software developer Reallusion. The event called upon artists from across the globe to submit drawings and animations of their favorite JFH characters as well free comics and animation software as incentives to participate. Winners were announced in April 2012. The JFH Motion Comic Animation had its premiere public screening at the 2012 San Diego Comic-Con's Superhero Kung Fu Extravaganza hosted by Ric Meyers, where Jan and Willow Road President Zach Shelton announced a live action feature film and animated series production partnership for JFH: Justice-For-Hire with Spillwall Productions. Spillwall Vice President Sam Levine was present to address the event's audience.

In 2013, the JFH motion comic pilot episode began its official film festival and industry competition run, winning the 34th Annual Silver Telly Awards highest honor for Best Use of Animation Online, a 2013 Silver Davey Award, and the Award of Merit at the 2014 Accolade Competition.

== Films ==
Announced at the 2012 San Diego Comic-Con Superhero Kung Fu Extravaganza, the live-action adaptation of JFH: Justice-For-Hire is slated for production via a partnership between Jan Lucanus's company Creative Impulse Entertainment. (CIE) and the Canadian-based Spillwall Productions. Jan will co-direct and co-star as one of the main characters, "Ebony",. The feature follows an original story conceived by Jan and developed via a partnership between CIE and Nine Dot Entertainment that will act as a prequel to the first season of JFH comics. The screenplay is co-written by Jan, award-winning screenwriter and director Aurore Barry, and Jan's father, comic book writer Jan C. Childress.

In 2013, the JFH creative team launched a successful Kickstarter campaign to shoot a short film to establish the cinematic tone for the JFH feature, as well as test out a martial arts camera system designed for the film, called "Weapon Camera Movement". The short, entitled JFH: Justice For Hire - Retribution Task Force, brought together several characters across the JFH Universe for a common goal - stopping acts of violence against women committed by the Raskol gangs of Papua New Guinea. The film premiered at the 2014 Comic Con Superhero Kung Fu Extravaganza, and was a featured screening at the HBO/Cinemax Urban Action Showcase and Bent-Con in the same year.
