= Thrill Seekers (film) =

1999 television film

- Written by: Kurt Inderbitzin; Gay Walch
- Directed by: Mario Azzopardi
- Starring: Casper Van Dien; Catherine Bell; Julian Richings
- Music by: Fred Mollin
- Country of origin: United States
- Original language: English

Production
- Cinematography: Derick Underschultz
- Editor: Ron Wisman
- Running time: 88 minutes

Original release
- Release: October 17, 1999

Thrill Seekers (also known as The Time Shifters) is a 1999 science fiction television film directed by Mario Azzopardi and starring Casper Van Dien, Catherine Bell, Julian Richings and Martin Sheen. The film aired on October 17, 1999 on TBS.

The film was shot in 1999 from May to June in Hamilton and Toronto, Ontario, Canada.

== Plot ==
Tom Merrick (Van Dien) is a TV reporter filming a live segment on a fire at a power plant. He spots a creepy-looking man (Richings) dropping his watch. This momentary distraction saves his life when parts of the building collapses on top of his crew. After the accident, a grief-stricken Merrick gives up his job as a reporter and begins working for a magazine.

In June 2000, while researching catastrophes, Merrick finds several pictures of the man from the power plant, who appears to turn up in different disasters (sinking of Titanic, Hindenburg disaster and Hurricane Hugo), but who still looks the same in all the pictures. Merrick's boss Eleanor books him a flight to Washington, D.C. to get the original photographs. On the plane, he spots the man from the power plant and photos and checks his luggage. He finds a flyer and discovers a future enterprise – Thrill Seekers – will make time travel possible in the year 2070 and will sell trips to the past to allow travelers to visit a catastrophe before it occurs, but are able to travel back in time again before they get killed. Merrick finds out that the flight he is on will be involved in a mid-air collision, killing everyone on board.

Merrick forces the pilots to change course, which saves the plane from crashing. The mysterious man disappears before landing. Merrick is arrested by the FBI on the charge of aircraft hijacking. Agent Baker is sure about the hijacking attempt while his partner, Agent Stanton, believes Merrick's story. The averted disaster causes changes in the future, so Grifasi (Sheen), the head of Thrill Seekers, sends agents Cortez and Felder to the past to stop Merrick. The agents kidnap Merrick, but he is able to escape and hide.

Merrick contacts his colleague Elizabeth (Bell) for help. They head to the Chicago subway where, according to the future itinerary, the next catastrophe will take place. They spot the man from the previous events and board the same train. Merrick confronts the man and takes his time-travel device. The engineer appears unconscious, and the train accelerates uncontrollably. Merrick manages to disconnect the locomotive from the rest of the train, but the time traveler remains behind and is killed. Cortez and Felder are informed by Grifasi that the prevention of the train wreck has had a huge impact on the future. The agents, whose own time lines are protected by a containment field around the time machine in the future, are warned that these changes may even prevent them from returning to their own time.

While checking the time-traveling device, Merrick learns of another catastrophe: a fire at Copps Coliseum that will kill over 11,000 people, including his ex-wife and son. Unable to convince them not to go, Merrick tells the FBI about the coming disaster. While Baker is still suspicious, he decides to be cautious and has firefighters dispatched. They manage to put out a fire in the stadium restaurant which was the probable cause of the disaster.

Felder and Cortez are now informed by Grifasi that the timeline has been severely altered and the world they know no longer exists with millions of people in California being killed when a nuclear reactor melted down 22 years earlier in the new timeline. The agents are also unable to return because they learn that one of the surviving passengers from the averted plane crash killed the inventor of the time travel device in a car crash before he could invent it. The only way to reset the timeline is to make sure the Copps Coliseum fire occurs in order to prevent the timeline from altering too much to be recoverable and then to travel to the past to prevent Merrick from saving the lives of the people who will go on to cause the California disaster in the future.

The agents pursue Merrick and blow up his car with Elisabeth in it, then travel to the stadium and plant multiple explosive devices. The explosions kill Merrick's ex-wife and son. Merrick uses the time-travel device and returns to the time before Elisabeth is killed. Merrick and Elizabeth manage to partially evacuate the stadium before the agents set off the explosions. Felder, who now regrets his actions, kills Cortez but is then killed by falling rubble. As he dies, Felder recognizes Stanton as the inventor of the time machine and tells him not to invent it, but Stanton appears not to understand the warning. Merrick, along with Elizabeth, his ex-wife, and son survive the accident. Merrick and Elizabeth share a kiss while a group of time travelers watches the scene.

== Cast ==
- Casper Van Dien as Tom Merrick
- Catherine Bell as Elizabeth Wintern
- Theresa Saldana as Cortez
- Peter Outerbridge as Felder
- Julian Richings as Murray Trevor, Time-Traveling Tourist
- Lawrence Dane as FBI Agent Baker
- James Allodi as FBI Agent Stanton
- Catherine Oxenberg as Thrill Seekers Spokesperson (credited as Catherine Van Dien)
- Mimi Kuzyk as Eleanor Grayson
- Martin Sheen as Grifasi

== See also ==
- List of films featuring time loops
