= Rue Morgue (magazine) =

Horror fiction magazine

- Children's television character The Count on the cover of Rue Morgue issue 62
- Executive Editor: Andrea Subissati
- Contributing Editor: Monica S. Kuebler
- Online Managing Editor: William J. Wright
- Music Editor: Aaron Von Lupton
- Games Editor: Evan Millar
- Former editors: Rodrigo Gudiño; Dave Alexander; Jovanka Vuckovic
- Categories: Horror film, horror television, horror fiction, non-fiction
- Frequency: Bimonthly
- Format: Print
- Publisher: Rodrigo Gudiño
- Founder: Rodrigo Gudiño
- Founded: 1997
- First issue: October 1997
- Company: Marrs Media Inc.
- Country: Canada
- Based in: Toronto
- Language: English
- Website: rue-morgue.com
- ISSN: 1481-1103
- OCLC: 43828659

Rue Morgue is a multinational magazine devoted to coverage of horror fiction. Its content comprises news, reviews, commentary, interviews, and event coverage. Its journalistic span encompasses films, books, comic books, video games, and other media in the horror genre. Rue Morgue was founded in 1997 by Rodrigo Gudiño, and is headquartered in Toronto, with regional offices in various countries throughout North America, the United Kingdom, and Europe. The magazine has expanded over time to encompass a radio station, book publishing company, and horror convention. The magazine's namesake is Edgar Allan Poe's short story "The Murders in the Rue Morgue" (1841).

Rue Morgue won the Rondo Award in the "Best Magazine" category every year from 2010 to 2016. The magazine published its landmark 200th issue in May 2021, which featured an exclusive interview with Academy Award-winning director Oliver Stone.

== Staff ==
Founder and former editor-in-chief Rodrigo Gudiño serves as the company president. As of March 2017, the executive editor is Andrea Subissati; contributing editor Monica S. Kuebler oversees book features and reviews; online managing editor William J. Wright handles news and reviews on Rue-Morgue.com; operations manager Patricia Damen handles customer service and ensures that all weekly office operations are running smoothly; and music editor Aaron von Lupton oversees music features and reviews. The art director is Shane Mills.

Some of the magazine's reviewers and feature writers are Michael Gingold, John W. Bowen, Paul Corupe, Sean Plummer, Gary Pullin, Aaron Von Lupton and Kaci Hansen, who publishes under the moniker "The Homicidal Homemaker".

Rue Morgue International publishes and maintains offices in the United Kingdom, Germany, France, and Mexico. Gudiño was the magazine's first editor-in-chief; he was followed by Jovanka Vuckovic, then Dave Alexander, who stepped down in 2017. The Rue Morgue logo was created by former art director Gary Pullin, and first appeared on the cover of the seventh issue.

== Distribution ==
Rue Morgue secured national distribution in Canada by its fourth issue, published in July 1998. It began distribution in the United States in January 1999. By 2006 it closed a direct distribution deal for Europe.

Rue Morgue was published every other month for a number of years, then in January 2005 began publishing 11 issues per year (no issue was published in February). In 2017, the magazine returned to bimonthly publication.

== Other media and events ==
From 2004 to 2012, Rue Morgue broadcast a weekly online radio show called Rue Morgue Radio hosted by Tomb Dragomir, made up of horror music, film reviews, and offbeat film clips. It was released through the magazine's website and as a podcast. For a time, the magazine also had a sister show, the Rue Morgue Podcast, which was all interviews and commentary.

The magazine's website hosted a Web forum called Rue Mortuary. When Rue Morgue decided to stop managing the forum, ownership shifted to Cinephobia and it was renamed The Mortuary. The new address became the-mortuary.com.

In 2010, Rue Morgue released a free album of horror themed music for download entitled Hymns from the House of Horror. Another album, Hymns from the House of Horror II, followed in 2011.

Rue Morgue has sponsored the Rue Morgue Festival of Fear in Toronto, and the Dark Carnival Expo in Hamilton, Ontario.

Popular YouTube Channel HorrorBabble regularly collaborates with Rue Morgue Library for readings of little-known horror short stories & novellas.

The magazine regularly hosts cultural events, including screenings of classic horror films (with their stars or creators in attendance) and horror-themed art shows. Rue Morgue has also hosted the premiers of mainstream horror films in Canada, including the Canadian release of Annabelle.

In 2013, the company started an imprint called The Rue Morgue Library.

The magazine's 19th anniversary was celebrated by the city of Montreal in 2016 with the redecoration of the Auberge Le Saint-Gabriel with horror-themed decor.

=== Cinema ===
Rue Morgue Cinema, a production company, debuted its first film at the 2006 Toronto International Film Festival, and has since produced several short films. Among these are publisher Rodrigo Gudiño's The Eyes of Edward James, The Demonology of Desire, and The Facts in the Case of Mister Hollow (with Vincent Marcone). Rue Morgue Cinema also produced a music video for "In the Dark", a single by The Birthday Massacre. Gudiño co-directed the video with lead guitarist Michael Falcore.

The company's biggest-budget project was the feature film The Last Will and Testament of Rosalind Leigh (2013), which starred Aaron Poole and Vanessa Redgrave.

Rue Morgue and Unstable Ground co-promote a monthly film festival in Toronto called Little Terrors, which screens short horror films. In 2017, Rue Morgue, Unstable Ground, and Indiecan began compiling Little Terrors films into video anthologies.

== See also ==
- Famous Monsters of Filmland
- Fangoria
- Scream (magazine)
