= Why Horror? =

- Written by: Rob Lindsay
- Produced by: Nicolas Kleiman; Rob Lindsay
- Starring: Joe Begos; John Carpenter; Rodrigo Gudiño
- Narrated by: Elijah Wood (animation only)
- Cinematography: Kiarash Sadigh
- Edited by: Nicolas Kleiman
- Music by: Joel S. Silver
- Production company: Don Ferguson Productions
- Release date: October 3, 2014 (Feratum Film Festival)
- Running time: 81 minutes
- Country: Canada
- Language: English

Why Horror? is a 2014 Canadian documentary film directed by Nicolas Kleiman and Rob Lindsay and written and co-produced by Lindsay. A work-in-progress draft of the film was screened in August 2014 at the Fantasia Festival and the official final version was screened on 3 October 2014 at the Feratum Film Festival. The documentary explores the psychology of the reasons why people enjoy the horror genre and includes interviews by several well-known horror icons.

Funding for the film was partially raised by a successful Kickstarter campaign.

== Synopsis ==
The documentary follows horror movie fan and journalist Tal Zimerman as he tries to look at the reasons why people enjoy the horror genre. The genre is globally popular and is present in a wide variety of formats such as films, books, music, graphic novels, artwork, and video games, yet reactions to it can sometimes be polarized and in some instances Tal feels that the genre's fans are misunderstood. At the same time, Tal is conflicted over how he can be "disturbed by gruesome imagery showcased in the news, but thrives on blood and guts found in movies, books, music, graphic novels and video games" and as such sets out to try to find how horror affects his mind. For his research Tal interviews several different people, from genre filmmakers and writers to scientists and psychologists, to uncover why people enjoy horror and how perception, traditions, and beliefs help impact how horror is perceived and displayed in various countries and globally as a whole.

== Cast ==
- Tal Zimerman
- Joe Begos
- John Carpenter
- Rodrigo Gudiño
- David Hackl
- Junji Inagawa
- Shinji Mikami
- Tony Moore
- Gary Pullin
- George A. Romero
- Eli Roth
- Takashi Shimizu
- Graham Skipper
- Jen Soska
- Sylvia Soska
- Kazuo Umezu
- Chris Alexander
- Elijah Wood (animation narration)

== Development ==
Initially Zimerman approached the directors with the intent to focus specifically on Toronto's horror scene, to which Kleiman and Lindsay asked "why only Toronto if that city is very small and horror very popular" and why Zimerman personally enjoyed the horror genre. Zimerman was unable to answer, which gave them the idea of focusing on the psychology of horror. Filming for Why Horror? took place over a three-year period, during which time the film's crew traveled to various locations in the world to explore the different variations of horror and how that society's culture impacted how horror was depicted and viewed. By October 2013 the film had moved into production but still required funding to buy the rights to films the crew wanted to showcase in the documentary as well as to afford travel to different locations to film various interviews that they still required and to document horror in other countries. A Kickstarter campaign was launched and actor Elijah Wood contributed to the campaign and later agreed to narrate the documentary's animated clip.

They chose to avoid focusing on heavy metal and rock music as they felt that it was "part of the greater subculture that doesn't necessarily apply to why we enjoy being scared". They also wanted to avoid covering material that had already been done in other documentaries that focused on how creative professionals scare people and while editing the film eliminated material that they did not feel dealt with the primary question of why people enjoy horror. Filming in each global location chosen for Why Horror? typically lasted about two and a half weeks and events covered included Mexico's Day of the Dead festival. Other elements covered included fMRI brain scans where they monitored Zimerman's brain activity while viewing clips from horror films.

== Reception ==
Twitch Film praised Why Horror?, stating that they found it to be "humorous, inciteful and still manage to provoke thought". Digital Journal also reviewed the film and wrote "There are no ground-breaking ... revelations. Instead the film appears to have a different objective: to show dedicated horror fans they're not alone (and there's nothing wrong with them)."

=== Awards ===
- Bronze Audience Choice Award for Best Feature Film at the Toronto After Dark Film Festival (2014, won)
- Best Poster Award at the Toronto After Dark Film Festival (2014, won)
