= John McCarthy (composer) =

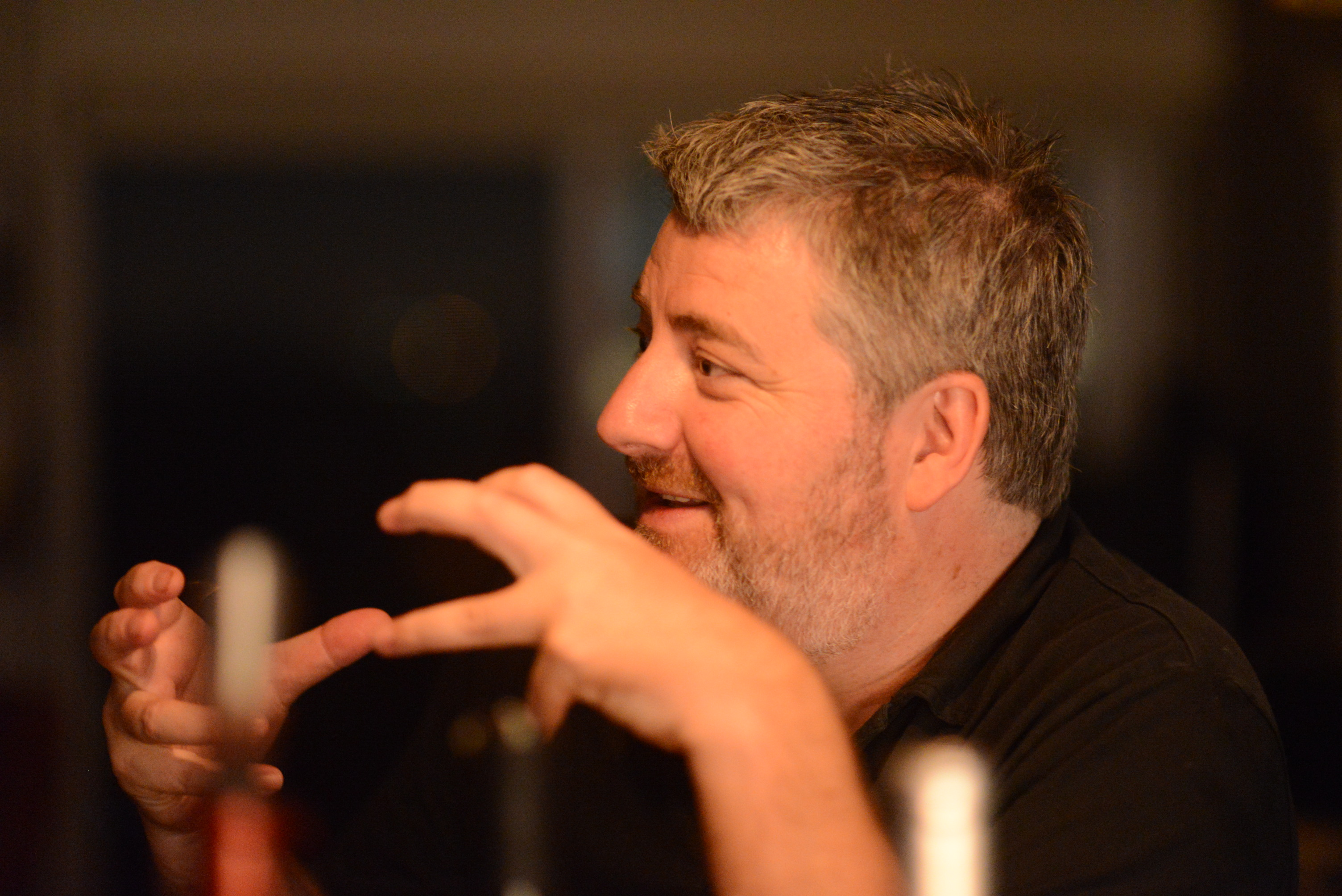

Background information
- Born: June 27, 1961 (age 64); Toronto, Ontario, Canada
- Occupation: Composer
- Years active: 1993–present
- Website: mccarthymusic.com

John McCarthy (born June 27, 1961) is a Canadian composer for film and television. His music has been described as a hybrid of acoustical and electronic elements. McCarthy’s background includes extensive experience in classical, jazz, rock, and world music.

== Life and career ==
McCarthy studied at The Royal Conservatory of Music and Humber College. He has recorded and toured with many bands including Ian Hunter (Mott The Hoople) and Frozen Ghost.

McCarthy's first film, Love and Human Remains, was directed by Academy Award winner Denys Arcand. The film is a dark comedy about a group of GenX twenty-somethings (one of whom is a serial killer) who are looking for love and meaning in a big city during the 1990s. McCarthy scored a pair of episodes of the 2015 David Shore/Vince Gilligan show Battle Creek (CBS).

His other work in television includes scoring the CBS series Due South (created by Academy Award winner Paul Haggis) and the NBC series My Own Worst Enemy, starring Christian Slater.

In 2010, McCarthy scored the short film Local Change, Global Impact. The film was produced by the International Peace Institute, a division of the United Nations, and narrated by Patrick Stewart.

McCarthy is the younger brother of actress Sheila McCarthy. They have worked together on several movies including The Stone Angel, The Possession of Michael D, and Virtual Mom.

== Awards ==
McCarthy won the Genie Award (Canadian Academy Award) in 2009 for Best Original Score for the feature film The Stone Angel, starring Ellen Burstyn and directed by Kari Skogland.

In 2001, McCarthy received the Dale Melbourne Herklotz Award for Excellence in Music at the Marco Island Film Festival for Dischord.

In addition, McCarthy was nominated for Gemini Awards in both 1995 and 1996 for Best Original Music Score for the television series Due South.

== Selected filmography ==
=== Film ===
- Anything for Jackson (Vortex Productions, 2020)
- Faces in the Crowd (Forecast Pictures, 2011)
- The Stone Angel (Handmade Pictures, 2007)
- Suspect Zero (Paramount, 2004)
- Tempo (Universal, 2003)
- Dischord (Vanguard Cinema, 2001)
- Turbulence 3: Heavy Metal (Cinemax, 2001)
- Boy Meets Girl (ARTO-pelli, 1998)
- Sweet Angel Mine (Handmade Pictures, 1996)
- Soul Survivor (Norstar, 1995)
- Paris, France (Alliance, 1993)
- Love and Human Remains (Sony Pictures Classic, 1993)

=== Television ===
- Battle Creek (CBS, 2015)
- My Own Worst Enemy (NBC, 2008)
- Jonny Zero (FOX/Warner Bros., 2005-2007)
- Freaky Stories (YTV, 1997-2000)
- Spicy City (HBO, 1997)
- Due South (CBS, 1994-1996)

=== TV movies ===
- The Road to Christmas (Lifetime, 2006)
- Another Day (USA Network, 2001)
- Zebra Lounge (HBO, 2001)
- Virtual Mom (CBS/Nickelodeon, 2000)
- Net Worth (CBC, 1995)
- The Possession of Michael D (Fox/Atlantis, 1995)
