= My Dad Is Scrooge =

- Directed by: Justin G. Dyck
- Written by: Keith Cooper
- Produced by: Beth Stevenson
- Starring: Bonnie Wright; Charles Shaughnessy; Jon Heder
- Cinematography: Kyle Francis
- Edited by: Kyle Popovich
- Music by: Meiro Stamm
- Production company: Brain Power Studio
- Distributed by: MarVista Entertainment
- Release date: November 10, 2014
- Running time: 87 minutes
- Country: Canada
- Language: English

My Dad Is Scrooge is a 2014 Canadian Christmas fantasy family comedy film directed by Justin G. Dyck and written by Keith Cooper. It stars Brian Cook and Charles Shaughnessy and featuring the voices of Bonnie Wright and Jon Heder. The film is a loose adaptation of Charles Dickens' 1843 novella A Christmas Carol.

== Story ==
Oliver and his little sister June's parents currently live separated. The children therefore spend the time shortly before Christmas with their father EB. EB is a businessman and has little sense of what he considers to be the excessive charity of his compatriots. On the way home, EB makes a business stop at Woodsley Farm and brings the owners the notice of foreclosure. Oliver is appalled because the Woodsleys are their neighbors and they often played with the animals on the farm. Suddenly they appear in Oliver and June's bedroom and speak to them. Oliver should help them and get his father to leave the farm to them. To do this, they want to help him rediscover the spirit of Christmas, as in Charles Dickens' story A Christmas Carol. Oliver is enthusiastic and wants to start the first phase together with dog Clark. To do this, they look for a former business partner of his father, who is so frightened by the talking dog that he is immediately ready to scare EB. He brings the message to EB that he will be visited by three spirits. And so the talking animals surprise EB late in the evening. Although he is not shocked when he sees a llama standing in his room that is covered by a bed sheet, he is still impressed when he is shown an old film. Here he was still a child himself and he remembers that he loved Christmas very much back then. And so this film keeps him busy all the next day. The next ghost fright takes time because EB has taken so much work home with him that he just doesn't want to fall asleep. The llama loses patience and gives him a headbutt, causing him to pass out. When he wakes up again, a talking rabbit appears to him as the “Spirit of the Present”. Conny shows him a film about the Woodsleys and how the old couple lovingly take care of sick and homeless animals. EB now admits that numbers and winnings are probably not everything. He wants to look at the contracts again, but would not be able to come to the children's Christmas play at school. June is very sad about it and so the animals hypnotize Oliver's father, who suddenly sees dog Clark as the "Spirit of Christmas to Come" when he wakes up. He wants to show him what will happen if he didn't change, but this time everything goes wrong. EB finds out that the kids set him up. But he finds one last film that shows his children how sad they are that their father is so hard-hearted. EB finally comes to his senses and finds his way back to his family. He announces to the Woodsley that their farm cannot be auctioned because it is a registered charity - which he arranged for. With the help of his little daughter, EB even reconciles with his father and everyone celebrates Christmas with the talking animals from the farm.

== Cast ==
- Brian Cook as EB
- Christian Kerr as Oliver
- Eva Greig as June

=== Voices ===
- Bonnie Wright as Connie
- Jon Heder as Raffi
- Joe Marth as Clark
- Geoff May as Pete
- Charles Shaughnessy as Judge
