= Shiro =

Shiro, Shirō, Shirow or Shirou may refer to:

== People ==
- Amakusa Shirō (天草 四郎; 1621–1638), leader of the Shimabara Rebellion
- Ken Shiro (ケンシロウ; born 1992), Japanese boxer
- Shiro Azumi (安積 四郎), Japanese football player 1923–1925
- Shirō Fukai (深井 史郎; 1907–1959), Japanese composer
- Shiro Ichinoseki (一ノ関 史郎; born 1944), Japanese weightlifter
- Shirō Ishii (石井 四郎; 1892–1959), Japanese microbiologist and lieutenant general
- Shirō Itō (伊東 四朗; born 1937), Japanese actor and comedian
- Shiro Izumi (和泉 史郎; born 1961), Japanese actor, known for the Super Sentai franchise
- Shiro Kasamatsu (笠松 紫浪; 1898–1991), Japanese artist
- Shiro Kashiwa (柏 至朗; 1912–1998), Attorney General of Hawaii from 1959
- Shiro Kawase (河瀬 四郎; 1889–1946), Japanese admiral
- Shiro Kikuhara (菊原 志郎; born 1969), Japanese football player
- Shiro Kishibe (岸部 四郎; born 1949), Japanese actor
- Shiro Koshinaka (越中 詩郎; born 1958), Japanese wrestler
- Shiro Kuramata (倉俣 史朗; 1934–1991), Japanese designer
- Shiro Makino (牧野 四郎; 1893–1945), Japanese general at the Battle of Leyte
- Shiro Maruyama (圓山 詩郎; born 1948), Japanese fencer
- Shirō Masamune (士郎 正宗; born 1961), Japanese manga artist
- Shiro Mataki (俣木 志朗; born 1953), Japanese rower
- Shiro Misaki (三崎 四郎), Japanese football player 1934
- Shirō Miwa (三輪士郎; born 1978), Japanese manga artist
- Shiro Miya (宮 史郎; 1943–2012), Japanese enka singer
- Shiro Nakamura (中村 史郎; born 1950), Japanese car designer
- Shiro Oishi (大石 史郎; born 1942), American judo practitioner and wrestler
- Shirō Sagisu (鷺巣 詩郎; born 1957), Japanese music producer and composer
- Shiro Saigo (西郷 四郎; 1866–1922), Japanese judo practitioner
- Shirō Sano (佐野 史郎; born 1955), Japanese actor and film director
- Shirō Sasaki (佐々木 史朗; born 1939), Japanese anime producer
- Shiro Sato (佐藤 志郎; born 1953), Japanese cross-country skier
- Shiro Sokabe (曽我部 四郎; 1865-1949), Japanese Christian minister
- Shiro Suzuki (鈴木 史朗; born 1938), Japanese television announcer
- Shiro Yadama (矢玉 四郎; born 1944), Japanese author

== Fictional characters ==
- just Shiro
  - Shiro (シロ), pet dog in Crayon Shin-chan
  - Shiro (シロ), mysterious albino girl in Deadman Wonderland
  - Shiro, firearms-obsessed nephew in Samurai Cat
  - Shiro (白), gamer in No Game No Life
  - Shiro (シロ), a supporting character in The Helpful Fox Senko-san
- Shiro as a first or last name
  - Kamui Shiro (司狼 神威), the main character of X
  - Shiro Amada (シロー・アマダ), commander in Mobile Suit Gundam: The 08th MS Team
  - Shirou Emiya (衛宮 士郎), the main character in Fate/stay night media
  - Shiro Fujimoto (藤本 獅郎), a character in Ao no Exorcist
  - Shiro Kanzaki (神崎 士郎), a character and the main antagonist from the Tokusatsu TV series Kamen Rider Ryuki.
  - Shirou Kazami (風見 士郎), the father of protagonist of Please Teacher!
  - Shiro Kyoda (京田四郎), protagonist in Plamo-Kyoshiro
  - Shiro Miyata (宮田司郎), a character in the PlayStation 2 horror/stealth video game Forbidden Siren
  - Shiro Ōgami (大賀美 詩呂), a character in the Revue Starlight franchise
  - Shirō Shimizu (清水四郎), young theology student in Jigoku
  - Shiro Netsuma (シロ＝ネツマ), a character portrayed by Yowane Haku from The Evillious Chronicles
- Shiro for short
  - Shiro aka Takashi Shirogane (銀貴), black paladin in Voltron: Legendary Defender

== Places ==
- Shiro, Texas, an unincorporated community in Grimes County
- Shirou, Iran or Shur Ab, a village in Zanjan Province

== Other uses ==
- Shiro (food), an East African stew of chickpeas or broad bean meal
- Shiro (restaurant), in Ahakista, County Cork, Ireland
- Shiro Games, a French video game company
- Shiro, a mass of branches in the mycelium of a fungus
- Apache Shiro, a software security framework
- Japanese castle
- Shiro the cat, known online as Longcat

== See also ==
- Siro (disambiguation)
