= Casket Girls (film) =

- Directed by: Justin G. Dyck
- Written by: Thomas Lennon; Robert Ben Garant
- Produced by: Sean McKittrick; Raymond Mansfield
- Starring: Gabrielle Union; Mike Colter; Raúl Castillo; Matt Frewer; Thomas Lennon
- Music by: Joseph Bishara
- Production company: QC Entertainment
- Distributed by: Aura Entertainment
- Country: United States
- Language: English

Casket Girls is an upcoming American horror thriller film directed by Justin G. Dyck and written by Thomas Lennon and Robert Ben Garant. It stars Gabrielle Union, Mike Colter, Raúl Castillo, Matt Frewer, and Thomas Lennon.

== Cast ==
- Gabrielle Union as Detective Shay Williams
- Mike Colter as Galpin
- Raúl Castillo
- Matt Frewer
- Thomas Lennon
- Philip Granger as Captain Khalil
- Talisa Mae Stewart as Casket Girl #4

== Production ==
In September 2024, it was reported that a horror film directed by Justin G. Dyck and written by Thomas Lennon and Robert Ben Garant was in development, with Gabrielle Union and Philip Granger headlining the cast.

Principal photography began on October 15, 2024, in Victoria, British Columbia.

== Release ==
In September 2026, Aura Entertainment acquired the distribution rights to the film.
