= Anything for Jackson =

2020 Canadian supernatural horror dark comedy film directed by Justin G. Dyck

- Film poster
- Directed by: Justin G. Dyck
- Written by: Keith Cooper
- Produced by: Bill Marks; Christopher Giroux; Justin G. Dyck; Keith Cooper
- Starring: Sheila McCarthy; Julian Richings; Konstantina Mantelos; Josh Cruddas; Yannick Bisson
- Cinematography: Sasha Moric
- Edited by: Vincent Whiteman
- Music by: John McCarthy
- Production company: Vortex Productions
- Distributed by: Shudder
- Release date: September 1, 2020 (Fantasia Film Festival)
- Running time: 97 minutes
- Country: Canada
- Language: English

Anything For Jackson is a 2020 Canadian supernatural horror dark comedy film directed by Justin G. Dyck, and written by Keith Cooper. The film stars Sheila McCarthy, Julian Richings, Konstantina Mantelos, Josh Cruddas, and Yannick Bisson. Anything for Jackson debuted at the Fantasia Film Festival in September 2020 before releasing on Shudder the following December.

== Premise ==
On the surface, the overly religious Audrey (Sheila McCarthy) and Dr. Henry Walsh (Julian Richings) look like any typical couple. They still grieve for the sudden death of their only grandson, Jackson (Daxton William Lund). Being Satanists, they have uncovered an ancient spell that can place Jackson into another vessel, i.e. a fetus. They kidnap a pregnant patient of Dr. Henry's, Shannon Becker (Konstantina Mantelos) and handcuff her to a bed. With the intention of performing a "reverse-exorcism" that will put Jackson's essence inside the woman's unborn child, they perform a rite, but perhaps not the one they want as they open the portal to purgatory as various souls desire the vessel.

== Cast ==
- Sheila McCarthy as Audrey Walsh
- Julian Richings as Dr. Henry Walsh
- Konstantina Mantelos as Shannon Becker
- Josh Cruddas as Ian
- Yannick Bisson as Rory
- Lanette Ware as Detective Bellows
- Claire Cavalheiro as Talia
- Scott Cavalheiro as Colin
- Daxton William Lund as Jackson

== Production ==
=== Development ===
The film was initially conceived when director Justin G. Dyck and screenwriter Keith Cooper, who are both fans of the horror genre, had met to discuss how to add a "fresh take" on an exorcism film, their idea was to do the opposite of an exorcism. Dyck and Cooper had previously collaborated on several made for television Christmas films. Dyck had accepted most of these projects as a means to gain experience and reputation, with the end goal being to fund Anything for Jackson. Dyck cited The Omen, The Changeling, The Shining, and What Dreams May Come as inspiration. Cooper had studied dream analysis while writing early drafts of the script. Early variations of the script followed the parents instead of the grandparents, but this was later changed as both opted to do something they had not seen in a film before.

=== Pre-production ===
Sheila McCarthy was first cast before any financing was acquired. Once they received funding, the filmmakers approached Julian Richings for the role of Henry, which was written with Richings in mind. Dyck and Cooper worked with their associate producer Rebecca Lamarche to cast the rest of the film.

=== Filming ===
Production began in 2020 on location in Barrie, Ontario, Canada. The house interior scenes were all shot in screenwriter Keith Cooper's house. Production concluded in March 2020.

== Release ==
Anything for Jackson premiered at the Fantasia Film Festival on September 1, 2020. The film was released on December 3, 2020 by Shudder.

=== Home media ===
The film was released on Blu-ray and DVD on June 15, 2021 by RLJ Entertainment.

== Reception ==
On the review aggregator website Rotten Tomatoes, Anything for Jackson holds an approval rating of 98% based on 63 reviews, with an average rating of 7.4/10. The website's critics' consensus reads, "A talented cast and fiendishly frightening premise combine to make Anything for Jackson a must-watch for fans of supernatural horror." On Metacritic, the film has an aggregated score of 67 out of 100 based on 4 reviews, indicating "generally favorable reviews".

Leslie Felperin of The Guardian awarded the film 3 out of 5 stars, writing: "Dyck and Cooper turn this almost comical premise into an interesting work that treads the line between genres with agility." She concluded: "it’s a richer devil’s brew than you would expect, crisply edited and moodily shot – even if the last act doesn’t quite hit the spot." Writing for RogerEbert.com, Brian Tallerico gave the film a score of 3 out of 4 stars, saying that it "lures viewers in with its clever concept and instantly strong characters only to present them with the kind of nightmare fuel that would impress Clive Barker." Writing for Nerdist, Kyle Anderson said: "While not as extreme as some might expect, Anything for Jackson is nevertheless and supremely creepy." Joe Lipsett of Bloody Disgusting wrote: "Despite losing its focus in the back half, McCarthy and Richings deliver great lead performances that – coupled with a creepy ghost design and some genuinely unsettling moments - makes Anything for Jackson a worthwhile twist on the exorcism/possession subgenre.".
