= Julian Richings =

English Canadian actor

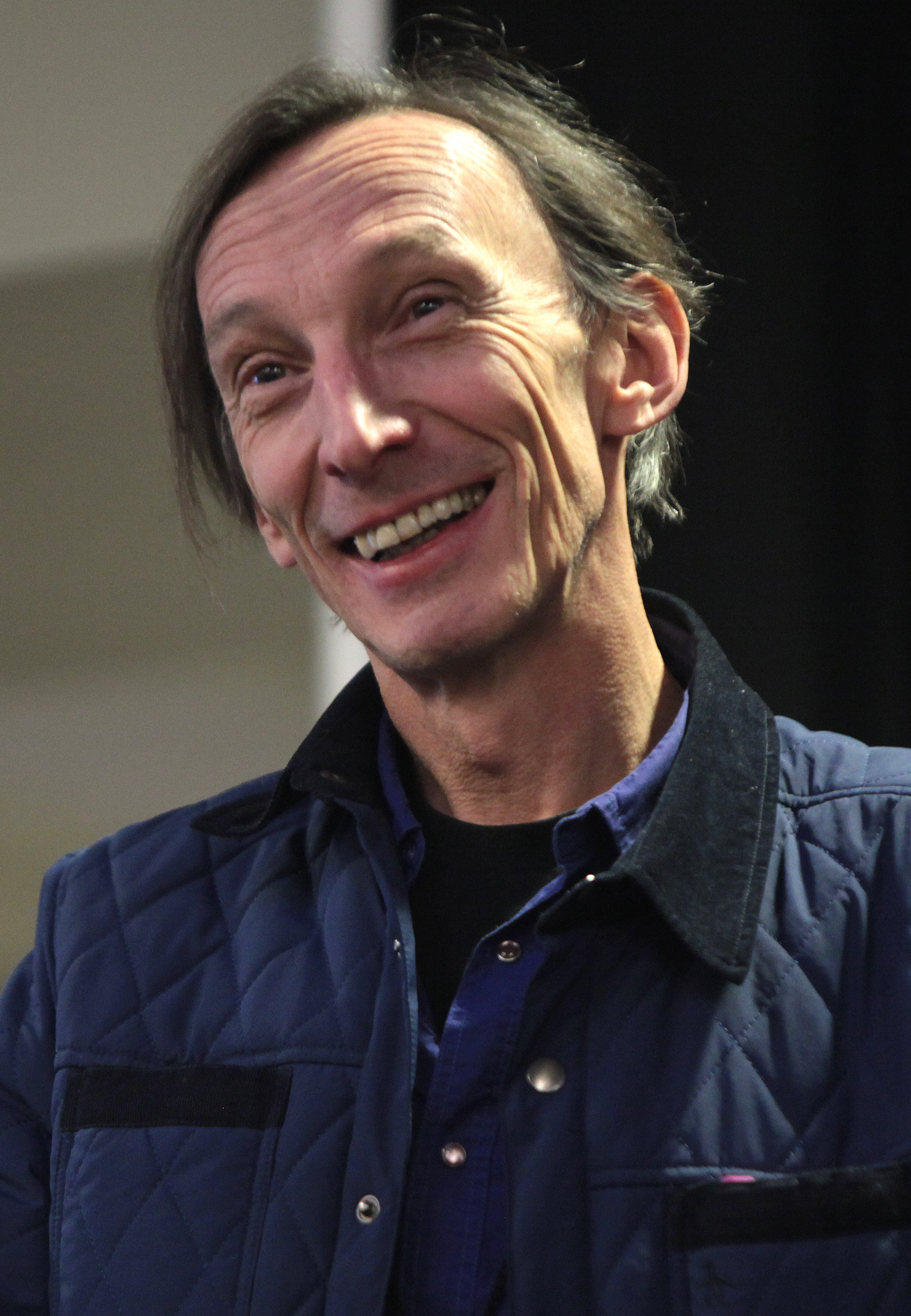
- Richings at the 2015 Phoenix Comicon
- Born: 30 August 1956 (age 70); Oxford, Oxfordshire, England
- Education: University of Exeter
- Occupation: Actor
- Years active: 1987–present
- Children: 2

Julian Richings (born 30 August 1956) is a British-Canadian character actor, having appeared in over 225 films and television series. He is best known for his appearances in a variety of horror films, including Cube, Wrong Turn, The Witch, Beau is Afraid, Ejecta, and Anything for Jackson, as well as for portraying Death in the dark fantasy series Supernatural.

== Early life ==
Richings was born in Oxford, England on August 30, 1956. He trained in drama at the University of Exeter.

== Career ==
After touring the United States with a British stage production, Richings moved to Toronto, Ontario, Canada in 1984. Within five years, he had become a regular on the second season of the War of the Worlds TV series. In the 1996 film Hard Core Logo, he played the bitter, aging, punk rock legend Bucky Haight. He appeared at the opening of the 1997 film Cube. In 1999, he appeared in the science fiction film Thrill Seekers.

In 2000, he appeared as Bellanger in The Claim, and earned a Genie Award nomination for best supporting actor. He was a member of the repertory cast of the A&E TV original series A Nero Wolfe Mystery (2001–02).

Richings performed in heavy makeup as cannibal-killer Three Finger in Wrong Turn (2003), and was a series regulars as the nearly-blind security guard Otto in Stephen King's 2004 miniseries Kingdom Hospital. Dramatic roles include stagehand Mr. Turnbull in the 2004 film Being Julia. He appeared as Orr, a cruel loan shark in the 2004 Canadian film The Last Casino. In 2006, he appeared in a brief speaking role as the Mutant Theatre Organiser in X-Men: The Last Stand, and played a vampire killer alongside in the direct-to-DVD horror film The Last Sect.

In 2007, Richings played a driver in the film Shoot 'Em Up, a dissipated and aging punk rocker in The Third Eye, transvestite psychologist Dr. Heker in The Tracey Fragments, and a number of small roles in other films, including Skinwalkers and Saw IV.

He appeared in the 2008 film The Timekeeper. That year, Richings was nominated for another Dora Award for his performance in The Palace of the End.

Richings made an appearance in the 2010 fantasy film adaption Percy Jackson & the Olympians: The Lighting Thief as Charon, the ferryman of Hades. That year, he began a recurring villain role on the horror comedy series Todd and the Book of Pure Evil. From 2010 to 2015, he portrayed Death in the hit dark fantasy series Supernatural. He was also Death in the short film Dave v. Death (2011).

He appeared in Zach Snyder's 2013 Superman film Man of Steel as Lor-Em, spokesman for the Kryptonian Council. The same year, Richings played the mysterious, stringy-haired Phil Prosser in Septic Man.

In 2014, he starred in the science fiction film Ejecta. The role earned him a Best Actor win at the Blood in the Snow Canadian Film Festival. In 2015, he appeared in Robert Eggers' horror film The Witch and the drama film Reign.

In 2019, Richings played Nazi scientist Heinrich Von Fuchs on DC Universe's Doom Patrol.

His portrayal of Henry Walsh in Justin G. Dyck's 2020 supernatural horror film Anything for Jackson, earned him his second Best Actor win at the Blood in the Snow Canadian Film Festival.

In 2022, Richings appeared in the television shows The Umbrella Academy, Reginald the Vampire, and Guillermo del Toro's Cabinet of Curiosities. In 2023, he had a role in Ari Aster's tragicomedy horror film Beau is Afraid.

In 2024, Richings appeared as Procrustes, the half-giant and half-brother of the titular character, in the Disney+ fantasy show Percy Jackson and the Olympians.

== Personal life ==
Richings resides in Toronto with his wife and two children.

== Filmography ==
=== Film ===
Year	Title	Role	Notes
1987	Love at Stake	Town Crier	
1989	The Top of His Head	Robert	
1991	Naked Lunch	Exterminator	
1992	Giant Steps	Danceband Teacher	
1994	Squanto: A Warrior's Tale	Sir George's Servant	
1995	Moonlight and Valentino	Hair Stylist	
1996	Hard Core Logo	Haight	
1996	Love Child	Tom Sr.	Short film
1996	The Boys Club	Officer Cole	
1997	The Cellar	Woolsey	Short film
1997	Mimic	Workman	
1997	Cube	Alderson	
1997	Pale Saints	Einstein	
1998	Urban Legend	Weird Janitor	
1998	Motel	Tenant	
1998	Red Violin	Nicolas Olsberg	
1999	Detroit Rock City	Ticket Taker	
1999	Thrill Seekers	Murray Trevor	
2000	The Crossing	McKenzie	
2000	Washed Up	Reginald	
2000	Rats	Orderly	
2000	Two Thousand and None	Curator	
2000	The Claim	Bellanger	
2001	Century Hotel	Waiter	
2001	I Shout Love	Cab driver	Short film
2001	On Their Knees	Pappy	
2001	Treed Murray	Homeless Man	
2001	The Pretender: Island of the Haunted	Brother Clote	
2002	Between Strangers	Nigel	
2003	Open Range	Wylie	
2003	My Life Without Me	Dr. Thompson	
2003	Wrong Turn	Three Finger	
2003	The Truth About the Head	Lobster	Short film
2003	Todd and the Book of Pure Evil	Satan	Short film
2003	Mad Shadows	Doctor	Short film
2003	Bar Life	Ed	Short film
2004	Being Julia	Mr. Turnbull	
2004	Sisters in the Wilderness: The Lives of Susanna Moodie and Catharine Parr Traill	William Cattermole	
2004	Run Away Home	Minister	
2004	Mr. Jones: Drive	Mr. Jones	Short film
2004	Safe	Jimmy	Short film
2004	Re-Generation	Contact	
2004	The Last Casino	The Usurer	
2005	Black Widow	Dr. Deadman	
2006	Skinwalkers	Sad-Looking Man	
2006	The Last Sect	Karpov	
2006	A Lobster Tale	Hank Perkins	
2006	Screening	News Anchor # 2	Short film
2006	X-Men: The Last Stand	Mutant Organiser	
2007	Shoot 'Em Up	Hertz's Driver	
2007	Dead Silence	Bos	Uncredited
2007	Saw IV	Vagrant	
2007	The Canadian Shield	Trapper Ray	Short film
2007	The Third Eye	Charlie Rabbit	
2007	The Tracey Fragments	Dr. Heker	
2008	Heartland	Mr. Hanley	
2008	Jack and Jill vs. the World	Mr. Smith	
2008	Toronto Stories	Leather Jacket	
2008	The Facts in the Case of Mister Hollow	Kneeling Man	Short film
2008	Elegy	Actor in Play	
2009	Curious Stories, Crooked Symbols	Sinister Kneeling Man	Short film
2009	The Timekeeper	Grease	
2009	You Might as Well Live	Dr. Pooseby	
2009	Survival of the Dead	James O'Flynn	
2010	Percy Jackson & the Olympians: The Lightning Thief	Charon	
2010	Hard Core Logo 2	Bucky Haight	
2010	Trigger	Bucky	
2011	Collaborator	Maurice LeFont	
2011	Animal Control	Larry	Short film
2011	Furstenau Mysteries	Jameson	Short film
2011	Up in Cottage Country	The Officer	Short film
2011	Patch Town	Child Catcher	Short film
2012	The Conspiracy	Green Man	
2012	The Architecture of the Moon	Jonas	Short film
2012	Rainbow Connection	Landlord	Short film
2012	The Last Will and Testament of Rosalind Leigh	Bill Phillips / Neither Man Nor Woman / Rahn Brothers	
2012	Artist: Unknown	Fred Varley	Short film
2012	The Tape	Jack	Short film
2013	Man of Steel	Lor-Em	
2013	The Young and Prodigious T.S. Spivet	Ricky	
2013	The Colony	Leyland	
2013	Septic Man	Phil Prosser	
2013	Victims	Gatling	
2013	We Are Not Here	Monday	Short film
2014	The Last Halloween	Chatterbox	Short film
2014	Bastards	Jack Cage	Short film
2014	Ejecta	William Cassidy	
2014	Patch Town	Yuri	
2014	Hellmouth	Smiley	
2015	A Christmas Horror Story	Gerhardt	
2015	The Rainbow Kid	Elvis Grimes	
2015	The Witch	Governor	
2015	Regression	Tom	
2015	Reign	Mr. Ian	
2015	She Stoops to Conquer		Short film
2015	All Hallows' Eve 2	Chatterrbox	Segment: "The Last Halloween"
2015	Business Ethics	Martin Abacus	Short film
2015	Friends Like Us	Ermanno Ca$$H	
2016	Blood Hunters	Father Stewart	
2016	Prisoner X	Jefferson	
2016	The Big Push	Billy	Short film
2016	The Space Between	Stash	
2017	Todd and the Book of Pure Evil: The End of the End	Hooded Leader / Malian Trader	
2017	Tomato Red: Blood Money	Tim Lake	
2019	Polar	Lomas	
2019	True Fiction	Lenny Rupert	
2019	Business Ethics	Martin Abacus	
2020	Stardust	Tony DeFries	
2020	Spare Parts	The Emperor	
2020	Road Kill Renegade	Hillbilly	Short film
2020	Anything for Jackson	Henry Walsh	
2020	Hall	Julian	
2020	Vicious Fun	Fritz	
2021	Chaos Walking	Gault	
2021	Charlotte	Dr. Kurt Singer/Policeman #1/SS Soldier #2	Voice
2021	Stanleyville	Homunculus	
2022	Time Traveling Through Time	Narrator	Short film
2022	Wickensburg	Mr. Hexenmeister	
2022	Salvation	John	
2022	Relax, I'm from the Future	Percy	
2023	Beau Is Afraid	Strange Man	
2024	Scared Shitless	Professor Cummings	Uncredited
2024	A Thousand Cuts	Webster	
2025	Honey Bunch	Delwyn	
2025	It Feeds	Dr. Ronald Whittaker	

=== Television ===
Year	Title	Role	Notes
1986	Dave Thomas: The Incredible Time Travels of Henry Osgood		TV film
1987	Adderly		Episode: "Nemsis"
1989–1990	War of the Worlds	Ardix; Alien Scientist; Man with Hat	15 episodes
1990	Counterstrike	Rettie	Episode: "Art for Art's Sake"
1990	Clarence	Reynolds	TV film
1991	Maniac Mansion	Tax Man	Episode: "Turner: The Boss"
1991	Rin Tin Kin: K-9 Cop		Episode: "What the Doctor Ordered"
1991–1995	Heritage Minutes	A.A. Milne; King Henry VII	2 episodes
1992	The Valour and the Horror	John Crocker	Episode: "In Desperate Battle: Normandy 1944"
1993	Street Legal	Harold Cooper-Haye Rolan Atkinson	1 episode 1 episode
1993–1994	Ready or Not	Mr. Boyle	4 episodes
1994	RoboCop	Dr. Proctor	Episode: "Faces of Eve"
1994	The Adventures of Dudley the Dragon	Alien	Episode: "Dudley Meets the Alien"
1995	Lonesome Dove: The Outlaw Years	Logan's Henchman	Miniseries; episode: "The Alliance"
1995	Forever Knight	Dr. Paul Dana	Episode: "A More Permanent Hell"
1995	The Shamrock Conspiracy	Reader	TV film
1995	The Song Spinner	Callo	TV film
1995	Strauss: The King of 3/4 Time	Bono	TV film
1996	Due South	Miles Emery	Episode: "The Promise"
1997	PSI Factor: Chronicles of the Paranormal	Earl Cornell	Episode: "The 13th Floor / The Believer"
1997	Ms. Scrooge	Christmas Yet to Come	TV film
1997	Artemisia	Painter	TV film
1997	Once a Thief: Brother Against Brother	Cam	TV film
1997–1998	Once a Thief	Cam	11 episodes
1997–1999	La Femme Nikita	Errol Sparks	2 episodes
1998	Universal Soldier II: Brothers in Arms	Bix	TV film
1998	Highlander: The Raven	Basil Morgan	2 episodes
1998	The Adventures of Shirley Holmes	Doctor Saul Sprockett	Episode: "The Case of the Film Flam Farm"
1998	Once a Thief: Family Business	Camier	TV film
1999	I Was a Sixth Grade Alien	Meenom	22 episodes
1999	Amazon	Elder Malakai	10 episodes
1999	Thrill Seekers	Murray Trevor	TV film
2000	Hustle	Detective Walsh	TV film
2000	The Crossing	McKenzie	TV film
2000	The Zack Files	The Mad Hatter	Episode: "Library of No Return"
2001	MythQuest	Loki	Episode: "Hammer of the Gods"
2001	Prince Charming	Wacktazar	TV film
2001	The Pretender: Island of the Haunted	Brother Clote	TV film
2002	A Nero Wolfe Mystery	Poet; Jerome Åland; Peter Jay; Alger Kates	6 episodes
2002	Tracker	Max	Episode: "To Catch a Desserian"
2002	Salem Witch Trials	Jonathan Walcott	TV film
2003	Eloise at the Plaza	Patrice	TV film
2003	Slings and Arrows	Reg Mortimer	Episode: "Geoffrey Returns"
2003	The Wonderful World of Disney	Patrice	2 episodes
2004	Kingdom Hospital	Otto	13 episodes
2004	The Last Casino	Orr	TV film
2004–2006	Puppets Who Kill	French Painter; Mr. Portnoy	2 episodes
2005	1-800-Missing	Doc	2 episodes
2006	At the Hotel	Baby Man	Episode: "That's How You Wave a Towel"
2006	The Shakespeare Comedy Show	Ranting Bard	3 episodes
2006	Drive Time Murders	'The Doc'	TV film
2007	Grossology	Darko Crevasse	Voice role; episode: "Lights Out"
2007	Nature of the Beast	Dr. Chamberlain	TV film
2007	Roxy Hunter and the Mystery of the Moody Ghost	Mr. Tibers	TV film
2008	Roxy Hunter and the Secret of the Shaman	Mr. Tibers	TV film
2008	Roxy Hunter and the Horrific Halloween	Mr. Tibers	TV film
2008	Roxy Hunter and the Myth of the Mermaid	Mr. Tibers	TV film
2008	XIII	Mr. Cody	2 episodes
2008	The Trojan Horse	Barrie	Miniseries; episode: "Part One"
2009	The Boarder	Professor Adrian Maguire	Episode: "Dying Art"
2009	Sea Wolf	Mugridge	Episode: "#1.2"
2009–2010	Heartland	Levon Hanley	2 episodes
2010	Wingin' It	William Shakespeare	1 episode
2010	Lost Girl	Arval	Episode: "Food for Thought"
2010–2012	Todd and the Book of Pure Evil	Hooded Leader; Atticus Murphy Sr.	15 episodes
2010–2015	Supernatural	Death	5 episodes
2011	Dave vs Death	Death	TV short
2011	Three Inches	Ethan	TV film
2011	Bag of Bones	Elmer Durgin	Episode: "Part 1"
2012	Republic of Doyle	Lionel Harris	Episode: "3x11"
2012	Transporter: The Series	Edouard Orlande; The Voice	5 episodes
2012; 2023	Murdoch Mysteries	Phillip Uxbridge; Carny	2 episodes
2013	Hemlock Grove	Swiss Doctor	Episode: "Catabasis"
2013	Rookie Blue	Cedric	Episode: "Poison Pill"
2014	Hell on Wheels	SLC Records Clerk	Episode: "Further West'
2014	The Listener	Miles Mellini	Episode: "Smoke and Mirrors"
2014–2016	Orphan Black	Benjamin Kertland	7 episodes
2015	Hannibal	Caged Man	Episode: "Secondo"
2015	The Expanse	Vargas	1 episode
2015–2018	Patriot	Peter Icabod	15 episodes
2016	Killjoys	Ancient Scarback	Episode: "Full Metal Monk"
2017	Fare Trade	Shifty	Episode: "In Search of: A Super Miracle"
2018	The Magicians	Asteroth	Episode: "The Losses of Magic"
2018	Channel Zero	The Gardener	3 episodes
2018	12 Monkeys	The Adviser	5 episodes
2018	Frontier	Mr. Pickersgill	Episode: "All For All and None For One"
2018	Creeped Out	Zephaniah	2 episodes
2019	Doom Patrol	Sturmbannführer Heinrich Von Fuchs	2 episodes
2019	The Christmas Temp	Luca	TV film
2019	Carter	Ray Understone	Episode: "Harley Loses a Finger"
2019	Perpetual Grace, LTD	Jonathan Joy	4 episodes
2019	Blood & Treasure	Alessandro	4 episodes
2019	Talent Drivers	Vince	Episode: "Give Him What He Wants"
2019	American Gods	Iktomi	Episode: "Muninn"
2020	Detention Adventure		2 episodes
2021	Chapelwaite	Phillip Boone	5 episodes
2022	The Umbrella Academy	Chet Rodo	Recurring role (season 3)
2022	Reginald the Vampire	Logan	2 episodes
2022	Guillermo del Toro's Cabinet of Curiosities	Dooley	Episode: "Graveyard Rats"
2024	Percy Jackson and the Olympians	Crusty / Procrustes	Episode: "We Find Out the Truth, Sort Of"
2025	The Institute	Stackhouse	Main cast
2026	Something Very Bad Is Going to Happen	Larry Pool, the ice cream vendor	Miniseries; episode: "The Witness"
2026	Eternally Yours	Vlad	Episode: "The Mistake"

=== Video games ===
Year	Title	Voice role	Notes
2015	Assassin's Creed: Syndicate	Charles Darwin	
2018	Starlink: Battle for Atlas	Grax	
2020	Watch Dogs: Legion		

=== Audio dramas ===
Year	Title	Role	Notes
2020-2022	The Integral Principles of the Structural Dynamics of Flow	Julian Richings	7 episodes

== On stage ==
Year	Title	Role	Director	Venue	Notes	Ref.
1987	The Elephant Man	John Merrick	Paul Lampert	Persephone Theatre		
1987	Amadeus	Salieri	Tibor Fehereghazi	Persephone Theatre		
1987	The Man Himself	Michael	Cheryl May		Flexible Packaging Plant	
1989	Coming Through Slaughter	Bellocq	Richard Rose	Silver Dollar Tavern	Necessary Angel Company	
1990	Lion in the Streets	Bill / Priest / Michael	Judith Thompson	Tarragon Theatre		
1996	Twelfth Night	Malvolio	Michael Langham	Atlantic Theatre		
1996	Two Weeks with the Queen		Maja Ardal	Young People's Theatre		
1997	Inexpressible Island	Browning	Richard Rose	Canadian Stage	Necessary Angel Company	
2008	The Palace of the End	David Kelly	David Storch	Canadian Stage		
2011	I Send You This Cadmium	John Berger	Daniel Brooks	Berkeley St. Theatre		
2014	I Send You This Cadmium	John Berger	Daniel Brooks	Enwave Theatre		
2016	To All a Good Night	Narrator	Andrew Burashko	Harbourfront Centre Theatre		
2016	Mustard	Leslie / Lewis	Ashlie Corcoran	Tarragon Theatre		

== Awards and nominations ==
=== Film and television ===
Year	Award	Category	Nominated work	Result	Notes	Ref.
2002	Genie Awards	Best Performance by an Actor in a Supporting Role	The Claim	Nominated		
2009	Chlotrudis Awards	Best Supporting Actor	The Tracey Fragments	Nominated		
2013	Hamilton Film Festival	Best Actor	Animal Control	Nominated		
2014	Blood in the Snow Canadian Film Festival	Best Actor	Ejecta	Won		
2020	Blood in the Snow Canadian Film Festival	Best Actor	Anything for Jackson	Won		
2020	Canadian Screen Awards	Best Supporting Performance - Web Program or Series	Talent Drivers	Nominated		
2021	New Media Film Festival	Best TV	Detention Adventure	Won	Shared with Sarah McVie	
2022	The North Film Festival	Lifetime Achievement Award	—N/a	Won		

=== Theatre ===
Year	Award	Category	Nominated work	Result	Notes	Ref.
1987	Dora Mavor Moore Awards	Outstanding Performance by a Male in a Principal Role - Play	The Man Himself	Won		
1989	Dora Mavor Moore Awards	Best Featured Performer	Coming Through Slaughter	Won		
1996	Dora Mavor Moore Awards	Outstanding Performance by a Male in a Principal Role - Play	Two Weeks with the Queen	Nominated		
2008	Dora Mavor Moore Awards	Outstanding Performance by a Male in a Principal Role - Play	The Palace of the End	Nominated		
