= Rodrigo Gudiño =

American film director

- Born: San Diego, California, United States
- Occupation(s): Film director, magazine editor
- Known for: The Facts in the Case of Mister Hollow, Rue Morgue

Rodrigo Gudiño is a Mexican Canadian film director and editor, known for being the founder of the horror magazine and company Rue Morgue. He currently serves as the company's president and also helps coordinate and program for several of the festivals and events that Rue Morgue holds or sponsors. Gudiño previously worked as the magazine's editor-in-chief before leaving the position to focus on making films. His short films were collected into the DVD Curious Stories, Crooked Symbols in 2009.

Gudiño was born in San Diego, California before moving to Tijuana at a young age. He began creating films in 2006 with the short The Eyes of Edward James and saw filmmaker Alejandro Jodorowsky as an influence on his work. Gudiño has also stated that his Catholic upbringing also influenced his work, and has remarked that he started his directing with short films released directly to film festival circuits as he wanted to "[develop] his abilities from an artistic standpoint" before moving to feature-length films.

== Filmography ==
=== Shorts ===
- The Eyes of Edward James (2006)
- The Demonology of Desire (2007)
- The Facts in the Case of Mister Hollow (2008, with Vincent Marcone)

==== Collections ====
- Curious Stories, Crooked Symbols (2009, collects his three short films)

=== Feature films ===
- The Last Will and Testament of Rosalind Leigh (2012)
- The Breach (2022) - based on the novel by Nick Cutter.

=== Television ===
- Darknet (2014, one episode)

=== Interviews ===
- Why Horror? (2014, as himself)
