= Romance in the Wilds =

- Directed by: Justin G. Dyck
- Written by: James Foti
- Starring: Kaitlyn Leeb; Victor Zinck Jr. Laura Vandervoort; Kate Vernon
- Production companies: INSP Films; Imagicomm Entertainment
- Release date: 2021
- Running time: 84 minutes
- Country: United States
- Language: English

Romance in the Wilds is a romance holiday television film directed by Justin G. Dyck, which first aired in 2021. A sequel to the film, Christmas in the Wilds, was aired that same year.

The film first aired on INSP, before it was made available for streaming exclusively on Vudu in September 2021, then on Fox Nation later that year.

== Plot ==
After the breakout of a deadly wildfire, an unexpected romance ignites between a geologist and a forest ranger as they battle to escape the wildfire. Buck and Jessica have no help from the outside world, and no car or plane to escape. Instead the duo must get over their difference of opinions to firstly survive, but then escape the potentially deadly situation.

Just when it looks like the duo have escaped the fire, they cross paths with a wild bear, again testing their resolve.

== Cast ==
- Kaitlyn Leeb as Jessica Alaway
- Victor Zinck Jr. as Buck Thompson
- Laura Vandervoort as Roma Thompson
- Kate Vernon as Janine Thompson
- Melinda Shankar as Amara
- Conrad Coates as Stanley Garson
- Andrew Bushell as Counsellor Jake
- Brian Cook as Martin Lamont

== Release and reception ==
Romance in the Wilds was exclusively streamed initially on Vudu in September 2021. It was a number of films picked up by Fox Nation for the Christmas and holiday season in 2021. It was also made available on UPtv and TVOD.

Romance in the Wilds was approved by The Dove Foundation for both faith and family-focused viewers. Movieguide scored the film 4 out of 5 stars.
