= The Ponysitters Club =

Canadian children's television series on Netflix

- Created by: Elizabeth Turner; Nancy Yeaman
- Directed by: Justin G. Dyck; Emma Jean Sutherland; Marco Deufemia
- No. of seasons: 2
- No. of episodes: 20

Production
- Executive producers: Adriano Schmid; Beth Stevenson; Nancy Yeaman
- Running time: 22 minutes
- Production companies: Brain Power Studio; Discovery Kids Latin America

Original release
- Network: Netflix
- Release: August 10 – November 16, 2018

The Ponysitters Club is a Canadian children's television series that debuted on Netflix on August 10, 2018. The drama follows a group of kids who seek to protect and raise horses and ponies on a ranch dedicated to rescuing abused animals. The show is based on the book by Victoria Carson, and stars Morgan Neundorf, Cailan Laine, Madeline Leon, and Hugh Wilson.

Season 2 was released a few months after the first season, on November 16, 2018.

The series made its linear debut on Discovery Family on September 5, 2020. It last aired on Discovery Family in 2021.

== Cast ==
=== Main ===
- Morgan Neundorf as Skye
- Cailan Laine Punnewaert as Shelby
- Diana Chrisman as Bianca
- Hugh Wilson as Grandpa
- Madeline Leon as Billy
- Khiyla Aynne as Trish
- Zyon Allen as Ethan
- Maya Franzoi as Olivia
- Victoria Tomazelli as Isabella

=== Recurring ===
- Kelly Pinch as Finn
- Paul Nicholas Mason as Barry

== Episodes ==
Series overview
Season	Episodes	Originally released	
Season	Episodes	First released	Last released
1	10	August 10, 2018	
2	10	November 16, 2018	
3	2	June 1, 2020	November 19, 2020

=== Season 1 (2018) ===
No. overall	No. in season	Title	Original release date
1	1	"Ponysitters Club"	August 10, 2018
2	2	"Minnie Mayham"	August 10, 2018
3	3	"Special Connections"	August 10, 2018
4	4	"BFFs"	August 10, 2018
5	5	"Pony Ride"	August 10, 2018
6	6	"Teamwork Trouble"	August 10, 2018
7	7	"Fire Scare"	August 10, 2018
8	8	"Riding School"	August 10, 2018
9	9	"Pony Blues"	August 10, 2018
10	10	"Kyle's Pony"	August 10, 2018

=== Season 2 (2018) ===
No. overall	No. in season	Title	Original release date
11	1	"Recipe for Success"	November 16, 2018
12	2	"A League of Their Own"	November 16, 2018
13	3	"Miss Hilda Said So"	November 16, 2018
14	4	"Talent Show"	November 16, 2018
15	5	"Pet Adoption"	November 16, 2018
16	6	"A Pony Sitters Holiday"	November 16, 2018
17	7	"Spooky Story"	November 16, 2018
18	8	"Costume Party"	November 16, 2018
19	9	"Careers and Competition"	November 16, 2018
20	10	"Springtime Foal"	November 16, 2018

=== Movies (2020) ===
No. overall	No. in season	Title	Original release date
21	1	"The Big Sleepover"	June 1, 2020
The Ponysitters look for a missing neighbour and have a sleepover.

No. overall	No. in season	Title	Original release date
22	2	"Fun at the Fair"	November 19, 2020
