= Khiyla Aynne =

Canadian actress

- Born: Toronto, Canada
- Occupation: Actress
- Years active: 2017–present

Khiyla Aynne is a Canadian actress. She is best known for playing Trish in the children's television series The Ponysitters Club and Hazel in the crime drama series Happy Face.

== Early life ==
Aynne was born in Toronto, Canada.

== Career ==
Prior to beginning her acting career she was chosen as a dancer at the Toronto concert on Justin Biebers Purpose World Tour. A year later she was invited by Ellen DeGeneres to perform live on her show. Her first big role came playing Trish in the children series The Ponysitters Club. She appeared in the dark fantasy film Nightbooks starring Krysten Ritter. Her biggest role so far has been playing Hazel in the crime drama series Happy Face. She did not meet co-star Dennis Quaid until shooting there first scene together as the director wanted the scene to be as real as possible.

== Personal life ==
In her spare time she likes spending time outdoors. She also loves to travel, having visited countries such as Chile and Costa Rica. She is a brand ambassador of the Doodle Roll

== Filmography ==
=== Film ===
| Year | Title | Role | Notes |
|---|---|---|---|
| 2017 | Ponysitters Club: Fun at the Fair | Trish | |
| 2017 | 48 Christmas Wishes | Sherry | |
| 2020 | Ponysitters Club: The Big Sleepover | Trish | |
| 2020 | Work It | Kayla | Short |
| 2021 | Kaira | Young Kaira | Short |
| 2021 | Nightbooks | Jenny | |
| 2022 | 13 | Charlotte | |
| 2022 | Christmas on the Rocks | Young Jennifer, Young Sarah | |
| 2024 | Trap | Wigged Dancing Girl | |

=== Television ===
| Year | Title | Role | Notes |
|---|---|---|---|
| 2017-2018 | The Ponysitters Club | Trish | 20 episodes |
| 2019 | Holly Hobbie | Young Performer | Episode; The Salty Songstress |
| 2020 | The Move | Girl | Episode; Khiyla-The Woah |
| 2022 | Circuit Breakers | Cassady | Episode; Parental Controls |
| 2025 | Happy Face | Hazel | 8 episodes |
