= Justin G. Dyck =

Canadian film director

- Born: Barrie, Ontario, Canada
- Occupations: Director; writer; cinematographer
- Years active: 1999-present
- Notable work: Anything for Jackson

Justin G. Dyck is a Canadian filmmaker. He is known for directing the horror film Anything for Jackson (2020).

== Career ==
After directing several made-for-TV films, mostly family-friendly Christmas-themed films, Dyck attracted considerable attention for directing the 2020 Canadian supernatural horror film Anything for Jackson. Starring Sheila McCarthy and Julian Richings, Anything for Jackson debuted at the Fantasia Film Festival in September 2020, before being released on Shudder the following December. The film received positive reviews from film critics.

For his work on Anything for Jackson, Dyck was nominated for the award for Best Director at the 2021 Fangoria Chainsaw Awards, but ultimately lost to Leigh Whannell for The Invisible Man.

== Filmography ==
=== Film ===
Year	Title	Director	Producer	Notes
2014	Monkey in the Middle	Yes	No	Directorial debut
2014	It's a Zoo in Here	Yes	No	
2014	My Dad Is Scrooge	Yes	No	
2015	Forest Fairies	Yes	No	
2016	Operation Christmas List	Yes	No	
2016	Super Detention	Yes	No	
2017	A Witches' Ball	Yes	No	
2017	Fast and Furriest	No	Yes	
2017	Best Friend from Heaven	Yes	No	
2020	Anything for Jackson	Yes	Yes	
TBA	Casket Girls	Yes	No	Post-production

=== Television ===
Year	Title	Notes
1999	The Real Darren Stevens Show	
2012	Fuzzy Tales	
2014	Gastroblast	
2016	A Puppy for Christmas	TV movie
2017	48 Christmas Wishes	TV movie
2017	A Very Country Christmas	TV movie
2017	Christmas Wedding Planner	TV movie
2018	My Perfect Romance	TV movie
2018	The Ponysitters Club	11 episodes
2018	Christmas with a View	TV movie
2018	Christmas with a Prince	TV movie
2018	Hometown Holiday	TV movie
2018	A Christmas Village	TV movie
2018	Christmas Catch	TV movie
2019	A Very Country Wedding	TV movie
2019	Art of Falling in Love	TV movie
2019	Love Alaska	TV movie
2019	Christmas with a Prince: Becoming Royal	TV movie
2019	Christmas in Paris	TV movie
2019	Baby in a Manger	TV movie
2020	Love by Accident	TV movie
2020	The Wedding Planners	2 episodes
2020	Ponysitters Club: The Big Sleepover	TV movie
2020	Love in Harmony Valley	TV movie
2020	Christmas in the Rockies	TV movie
2020	A Christmas Exchange	TV movie
2021	Romance in the Wilds	TV movie
2021	Christmas in the Wilds	TV movie
2023	Creepshow	2 episodes
