= Hard Core Logo 2 =

2010 film

- Directed by: Bruce McDonald
- Written by: Dave Griffith; Bruce McDonald
- Produced by: Holly Baird; Rob Merilees
- Starring: Adrien Dorval
- Narrated by: Bruce McDonald
- Cinematography: John Price
- Production company: Foundation Features
- Distributed by: Alliance Films
- Release date: December 4, 2010
- Running time: 85 minutes
- Country: Canada
- Language: English

Hard Core Logo 2 is a 2010 Canadian drama film written and directed by Bruce McDonald. It is a sequel to McDonald's 1996 film, Hard Core Logo. Hard Core Logo 2 assumes the same filmmaking style as McDonald’s latter-mentioned cult classic Hard Core Logo. It is a faux-documentary that follows Bruce the filmmaker (Bruce McDonald) as he investigates a claim made by Care Failure of the band Die Mannequin. She claims to be possessed by the spirit of rock star Joe Dick (Hugh Dillon), a principal character in the original movie, who was shown to commit suicide near the close of the film. This sequel follows tensions between the principal characters, and the progression of Bruce the filmmaker's investigation into Care Failure’s channeling of the deceased rocker's spirit.

== Cast ==
- Adrien Dorval as Rufus Mellon
- Care Failure as herself
- Dazzer Scott as himself
- Stacy Stray as himself
- Shannon Jardine as Liz Moore
- Sera-Lys McArthur as Jules
- Bruce McDonald as Bruce the Filmmaker
- Peter Moore as Simon Less
- Julian Richings as Bucky Haight
- Jodi Sadowsky as Nurse Lilly
- Paul Shull as Mr. Butterscotch

== Release ==
Hard Core Logo 2 was released for the first time on December 4, 2010 at the tenth annual Whistler Film Festival in Vancouver. It was the first movie by an already significant Canadian director (McDonald) to have its world premier at the Whistler event. The category of competition this mockumentary sequel entered in was the Borsos Award for Best Canadian Feature Film. It was judged alongside five other Canadian films in this category, losing to The Whistleblower by Toronto's Larysa Kondracki.

== Reception ==
Expectations were set high for Bruce McDonald when he released the second instalment of Hard Core Logo. This caused the film to receive mixed reviews, from those who compared it to the original. Following its release in 2010, it received some positive reviews, such as that of Katherine Monk, from Postmedia News. She writes that it is a film about "artistic inspiration, maintaining a pure creative heart and connecting with others through honest expression". Hard Core Logo 2 also garnered many negative reviews, such as that of Mathew Kumar, a critic for Exclaim. He writes that this film is a documentary of all the boring parts of music-making, unlike the first film, and then he says that it is a pathetic attempt at shocking the audience. The Globe and Mail later referred to the feature as giving the audience "no sense of urgency, desire, or necessity" to continue watching. The film received a 37 percent score on the film rating site Rotten Tomatoes.
