= The Good Guys (comics) =

Publication information
- Publisher: Defiant Comics
- Schedule: Monthly
- Format: Ongoing series
- Publication date: November 1993 - July 1994
- No. of issues: 9

Creative team
- Created by: Jim Shooter
- Written by: Jim Shooter, Jan C. Childress, Mike W. Barr, D. G. Chichester

The Good Guys is a comic book series that was published monthly by Defiant Comics from November 1993 to July 1994. Written by Jim Shooter, Jan C. Childress, D. G. Chichester, and Mike W. Barr, the series ran for a total of 9 issues until Defiant ceased publication. It was odd for the time in that its characters were created via a "talent search" for interesting character concepts.

== History ==
The story focuses on a group of young kids who were all attending a crowded comic book store on the day when a seeming magic box broke open. Unnoticed by most, many of the people in the store were affected by the box's energies. It is later implied that the box was harmless, given out by a mentally sick woman who has done this sort of thing before.

Laura Neale gains super-strength and durability. This also gives her the power to leap long distances. She reveals her power to her dad right away, seemingly the only one of the team who tells family. Daniel Jacobs, who has a crush on Laura, gains flight powers. Paul manifests a forcefield. Reggie is able to turn invisible and intangible by accessing an alternate dimension. He doesn't enjoy using his powers as the dimension frightens him. Jenni Lee and Matt Sahs gain identical powers of super-agility. Leaping off a four-story building is no problem for them. Matt's younger brother Zack gains the ability to cast a wide array of magical spells. He demonstrates this by creating costumes for the entire team by simply wishing real hard.

Spellcaster develops a mode of transport for the group, but like Reggie, it involves sliding through an alternate realm full of unexplainable dangers and creatures. Each transport means a fight with the monsters until the exit is reached.

=== Conflicts ===
On their first outing, they stop electronic store robbers and destroy a powerful monster threatening a group of homeless people. Daniel's crush on Laura causes minor problems. They kill the monster and gain an ally. It is Mrs. Johnson, a middle aged woman who strong like Laura. She lectures the team over their immature handling of the creature as they had caused much destruction and endangered lives. Soon after this incident, Laura's father reveals he has flight-based powers.

=== Master Ridgely Gatesman ===
The team later faces the threat of the manipulative son of very rich parents. Master Ridgely Gatesman has gained intelligence in the very reality-shaking incident that has granted so many other people super-powers.

He takes over his father's affairs, partly by blackmailing the man with his wife's fear of spiders. The Gatesman family chauffeur manages to summon the superhero team to the Gatesman family estate/island in order to rescue the parents. Ridgley's boobytraps ensnare all of them in many ways; for example the chauffeur is prevented from helping anyone else by motion-sensor water cannons.

The story comes to a climax in issue #7. Teamwork destroys the boobytraps and gets the heroes through other threats, such as mercenary soldiers. The team fights a super-powered being named Charles who thought the 'Good Guys' were a threat and vice versa. Charles stars in his own Defiant series called Charlemagne. In exchange for not battling Gatesman, he is allowed to leave with a device for his own purposes.

In short order, the island estate is destroyed, the parents rescued and Ridgely escapes in his own submarine. The teenagers use their powers to construct a raft to take the various people home. Spellcaster could have made a shorter trip, but it would involve further endangering the already traumatized civilians.

=== Other threats ===
Another group of enemies had been attendees of the comic book shop. They had formed their own group and become corrupt with power, even going as far as murdering a security guard. Matt Sahs discovers the dead guard's pistol and steals it. Though having powers himself, the temptation of the gun was very appealing.

Laura herself would personally face down a villainous older man who was also durable and strong like her. Though she escapes any actual physical danger because of her powers, she is deeply traumatized from the beating she received at his hands.

Near the end of their run, the team attempts to use their resources to establish a genuine team headquarters.
