= The Last Will and Testament of Rosalind Leigh =

- Directed by: Rodrigo Gudiño
- Written by: Rodrigo Gudiño
- Produced by: Jake Koseleci, Marco Pecota
- Starring: Aaron Poole; Vanessa Redgrave; Julian Richings
- Cinematography: Samy Inayeh
- Edited by: Duncan Christie
- Production companies: Rue Morgue Cinema; Someone At The Door Productions
- Distributed by: Image Entertainment
- Release date: 27 October 2012 (Razor Reel Fantastic Film Festival Bruges)
- Running time: 82 minutes
- Country: Canada
- Language: English

The Last Will and Testament of Rosalind Leigh (also known as rus. "Zaveshanie") is a 2012 horror film directed by Rue Morgue founder Rodrigo Gudiño. It was released in Russia on 13 June 2013 as Завещание and was later released direct to DVD on 30 July 2013 through Image Entertainment.

== Synopsis ==
Leon, a young man, visits his estranged mother's house after he learns of her death. As Leon explores the house and takes inventory, his mother, Rosalind Leigh, delivers a narration about her life in the form of a monologue to her son. It describes the crushing loneliness that she felt after he rejected both her and her faith due to negative religious experiences in his childhood. Concerned that Leon will never return to her life or regain his faith, she waits for him. At the same time that Rosalind delivers this narration, Leon deals with his feelings of guilt and grief, and he discovers that his mother had been the anonymous benefactor who bought all the items of antiquity he sold. When Leon faces his own demons in the house, avoiding sinister figures and a mysterious creature, he turns to his skepticism and to Anna, a person he contacts through his cell phone. Anna, who identifies herself as a doctor, talks Leon through two stressful situations which she interprets as severe hallucinations. Ultimately, Leon seems to have worked through his issues, and he tells his broker that he wants to put all of the art back on the market. As he goes to leave the house, his mother calls to him, halting his movement. Her monologue reveals that she eventually succumbed to her loneliness and killed herself in the house. Her explanation casts doubt on whether Leon ever came to the house at all, while some time later her spirit stares sadly out the window.

== Cast ==
- Aaron Poole as Leon
- Vanessa Redgrave as Rosalind Leigh
- Julian Richings as Rahn Brothers
- Stephen Eric McIntyre as Preacher
- Charlotte Sullivan as Anna
- Mitch Markowitz as Communication Coach

== Development ==
While creating the film Gudiño said that he was inspired by his Catholic upbringing and by Stanley Kubrick's tendency to shoot close to where he lived. The film was shot in Toronto and focused heavily on the idea of religion as something that drove the mother and son apart rather than brought them together.

== Reception ==
Ian Jane of DVD Talk rated it 4/5 stars and wrote that the film is "a well-made, very deliberately paced film that does the right thing in taking its time to let its mystery unfold in a refreshingly mature and appropriately artistic manner." Rod Lott of the Oklahoma Gazette wrote that the film's deliberate pacing causes "near-unbearable dread". Mike Ferraro of Bloody Disgusting rated it 2/5 stars and stated that while it "[provided] an interesting enough premise", the film "fails to really deliver the goods" and that they did not find the last act to be particularly shocking, as the plot took too long to unfold. In contrast, Brad McHargue of Dread Central rated it 4.5/5 stars; he called the film re-watchable and "cerebral".
