= The Little Rascals (disambiguation) =

The Little Rascals refers to producer Hal Roach's Our Gang theatrical short film comedies - specifically the 1929–1938 entries - syndicated for television under this title since 1955.

The Little Rascals or Little Rascals may also refer to:

- The Little Rascals (animated TV series), a 1982–1984 Hanna-Barbera Saturday morning cartoon series based on Our Gang
- The Little Rascals (film), a 1994 feature film based on Our Gang
- The Little Rascals Save the Day, a 2014 direct-to-video feature film based on Our Gang
- Oriental Heroes, a Hong Kong comic book series originally titled Little Rascals
- The child actors from the Our Gang comedies, described in Our Gang personnel
