= Paul Shull =

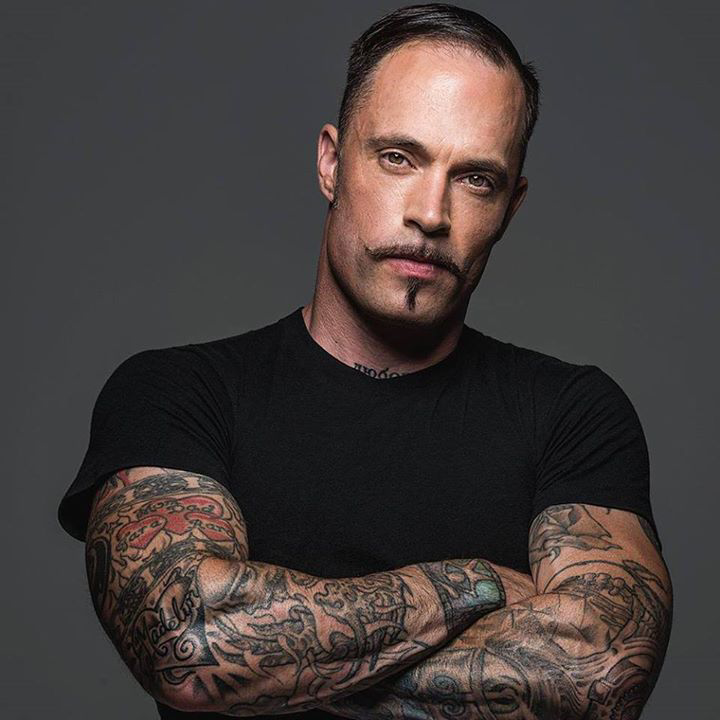

Background information
- Born: May 25, 1973 (age 52)
- Occupations: Artist Management, Actor, Television Host
- Years active: 1993-present
- Website: www.shullmgt.com

Paul James Shull (born May 25, 1973) is a rock music promoter and television host who has worked in music, film and television. He is the host of the television show The Weapon Hunter.

== Early life ==
Shull was born in Kitchener, Ontario and graduated with honours from St. Davids high school in Waterloo, Ontario in 1993.

== Career ==
=== Local years ===
In 1993, Shull became a music promoter, booking agent and band manager with London, Ontario based company Sink or Swim Promotions. He worked to promote local indie bands and booked local, national and international touring acts. That year Toronto's NXNE festival enlisted Shull to scout for bands and performers to add to their festival roster.

After three years, Shull bought Sink or Swim and helped promote Elmira, Ontario based band, The Ludes.

In 1996 Shull joined the Board of Waterloo Sounds of Summer Festival as director of programming. and spent five years organizing entertainment activities. The next year the festival attracted a crowd of about 10,000 people. Shull promoted Kitchener-Waterloo based psychedelic punk band Pablum in the US and booked bands regularly for local club, Angry Buddha’z in Kitchener.

=== International years ===
Shull became stage manager for Calc Enterprises (Kitchener, Ontario) and worked for Universal Concerts as an in house stage manager at local clubs in Kitchener, Guelph and London, Ontario. He promoted touring acts Garbage, Pennywise, Motörhead, Catherine Wheel, Robbie Williams, and Rodger Hodgson.

In 2000, Shull went to work at California-based Odd Job Inc. as an international stage manager. He toured backline tech with ska-punk band Goldfinger. As a stage manager, Shull toured Canada, USA, Portugal, Japan, Australia, Budapest, Prague, and Ljubljiana working at small and large outdoor festivals, as well as TV and radio performances. Shull also went on to stage manage international and national tours for Bloodhound Gang.

=== Later years ===
In 2003 Shull left the road to head up Watch Dog East in Toronto and booking agency S.L. Feldman & Associates and Macklam/Feldman Management. Shull acted as an artist liaison with labels, publishers and lawyers provided booking, tour support and management. He represented Sondre Lerche, Kyprios, Stabilo Boss and Day Theory. He managed Kitchener alt rock band The Miniatures, Toronto hip hop group Pocket Dwellers and Calgary, Alberta hard rock band Out of Your Mouth, and worked with local acts The Candidates, and Paul MacLeod’s band Hibakusha & Pimp.

In 2004 Shull was named president of DC Flag Records. The label's artist MC Chris had a top 10 single on iTunes in the U.S. and sold out 230 live performances. Other artists in the DC Flag family included hardcore punk super group Hazen Street and indie rock band Lola Ray from Brooklyn, NY. Shull also worked with Talk's Cheap Management in co-managing psychedelic stoner rock band Nebula.

=== 2006 - 2010 ===
In 2006 Shull formed Shull Management, an artist management company based in Toronto. He provided artist liaison with labels, publishers and lawyers, and signed Die Mannequin who were the opening act for Guns N' Roses on the eastern leg of their North American "Chinese Democracy" tour. Shull teamed up with Die Mannequin's Care Failure and started the label How To Kill Music .

Also in 2006, Shull became a member of the Artists Managers Expert Working Group and contributed to the planning and writing of the document Development, Marketing & Distribution in the Music Industry, a Competency Analysis, a reference regulating industry standards for those working within the music business in Canada.

The following year, Shull toured in support of Buckcherry, the Deftones and Canadian rockers Finger 11, and booked Die Mannequin on a tour with Sum 41 on their Strength in Numbers' tour followed by a European tour in 2007 with Danko Jones.

Shull teamed up with Canadian film director Bruce McDonald, to film The Rawside of Die Mannequin, an hour-long documentary television show created by I Mother Earth guitarist Jagori Tanna that featured a behind the scenes look at Die Mannequin on the road and writing their new album with their manager Mr. Butterscotch (played by Shull). The documentary premiered at Toronto’s 2008 NXNE Festival, 2008 and in 2009 it aired on Canadian digital specialty channel IFC and was nominated for two Gemini Awards, Best Photography in a Documentary Program or Series and Best Picture Editing in a Documentary Program or Series.

=== Recent and Current Years ===
More recently, Shull developed and hosted the television show The Weapon Hunter which focuses on military artifact collectors and military history.

== Personal ==
Shull began fencing in 2010, and became a C.I. certified fencing instructor. He also became President and a member of the executive of Excelsior Fencing Escrime. He served as chair of the Canadian Fencing Historical Committee in 2013.

== Filmography ==
Year	Film	Role	Notes
2009	The Rawside of Die Mannequin	Mr. Butterscoth	actor
2010	Hardcore Logo II	Mr. Butterscoth	actor, associate producer, music supervisor
2015	The Weapon Hunter	Himself	host, associate producer, story consultant
