= Shiro Suzuki =

Japanese announcer and tarento (born 1938)

- 鈴木 史朗
- Born: 10 February 1938 (age 88); Kita-ku, Kyoto, Kyoto Prefecture, Japan
- Other names: Shiro-san (nickname)
- Education: Waseda University Faculty of Law
- Occupations: Announcer; tarento
- Years active: 1962–70; 1984– (as announcer)
- Agent: Cast Plus
- Style: News; variety; narration
- Television: JNN Sports & News; Sanma no Super karakuri TV; Mito Kōmon
- Website: Official profile

Shiro Suzuki (鈴木 史朗, 鈴木 史郎, Suzuki Shirō; born 10 February 1938 in Kita-ku, Kyoto, Kyoto Prefecture) is a Japanese announcer and tarento. He was born in Kamigamo Shrine of the Shinto shrine of bushi samurais. After being a Tokyo Broadcasting System (TBS) announcer he later became a free announcer.

Suzuki is nicknamed Shiro-san (史朗さん, Shirō-san).

== Nanjing Massacre denial ==
Suzuki denied the Nanjing Massacre.

== Filmography ==
=== As a TBS announcer ===
News, informal, and documentaries

Year	Title	Notes	Ref.
1988	JNN News Desk	Saturday appearances	
1988	JNN News		
1990	JNN News no Mori	Headline narrator	
1993	JNN Sports & News	News Corner; Weekends	
	JNN Flash News	Saturday appearances	
	TBS News	Saturday appearances	
	Jōhō Tokushū		
	Anata ni On Time		
	CBS Document		
	Document USA		
	Document D-D	Narrator	

Music, quiz, variety programmes

Year	Title	Ref.
1970	TBS Uta no Grand Prix	
	Best Quiz Q & Q	
	Sekai No. 1 Quiz	
	Quiz! Atatte 25%	
	Sanma no karakuri TV	
	Sanma no Super karakuri TV	
	Akko ni Omakase	

TV drama

Year	Title	Role	Ref.
	Akai Meiro	Narrator	
1989	The Kyōiku-hi		
1993	Kōkō Kyōshi	News announcer	

TV anime

Title	Role
Sexy Commando Gaiden: Sugoi yo!! Masaru-san	Narrator

Non-genre

Title	Ref.
Kinyō TV no Hoshi!	

Radio

Year	Title	Notes	Ref.
1966	Konshū no Best Ten	Co-presented with Reiko Yukawa	
1968	Mazda Music Ralley	Co-presented with Eita Yashiro	
1997	Doyō Wide Radio Tokyo: Rokusuke Ei sono Shin Sekai		

=== As a free announcer ===
Year	Title	Network	Notes
1999	Tengoku ni Ichiban Chikai Otoko	TBS	Episode 7
2000	Mito Kōmon	TBS	Narrator
2000	Ōedo o Kakeru!	TBS	Narrator
2000	Black Jack Chart II	TBS	As Wedding host
2002	Kyoto Satsujin Annai	ABC	
2006	Ōoka Echizen	TBS	Narrator
	Waratte Iitomo!	Fuji TV	
	Satamoni	MBS	
	Vocabula Tengoku	Fuji TV	
	Tokumitsu & Shiro no Bōsō Oyaji-ana	TV Asahi	
	Kawazu-kun no Kensaku Seikatsu	Fuji TV	
	Hyōban! Nakamura-ya	ABC	Reporter
2011	Dai! Tensai terebi-kun	NHK-E	
	Poyopoyo Kansatsu Nikki	TV Tokyo	Episode 50; Narrator

=== Advertisements ===
Title
Takeda Pharmaceutical Company Benza Block Sekitome-eki, Benza Block no do Spray
Panasonic Sentaku Kansō-ki Enshinryoku
Alico Japan Hairemasu Series
Nintendo The Legend of the Quiz Tournament of Champions
NTT DoCoMo Answer House: iConcier
Kao Corporation Vlone
Shimano Auto D
Kirin Brewery Company Kirin Koi Aji <Tōshitsu 0>

=== Books ===
Title
Shiro Suzuki no Kenkō Dōjō: Go Chōju TV de Chōju no Kotsu

=== Discography ===
Year	Title
1999	"Sōshun Fu"
1999	"Nōka no Uta"
2001	"Tsuki to Sakazuki / Seimei Hotobashiru"
2003	"Ōedo-sen Ondo"

=== Others ===
Year	Title	Ref.
2007	Shūkan Famitsu	
2010	Famitsu Wave DVD March 2010 issue	
	Xbox Live Park: Resident Evil 5 Day	
	Nintendo Channel – Resident Evil: The Darkside Chronicles	
2012	Asahi Shimbun Kōkoku-kyoku Kikaku Seisaku	
