= Shiro Oishi =

Japanese-American judoka (b. 1942)

Medal record

Men's Judo

Representing USA

US National Championships
Silver medal – second place	Silver	1966

US National Championships
Gold medal – first place	Gold	1969

Shiro Oishi (Japanese: 大石 史郎, Hepburn: Ōishi Shirō; born 1942) is a Japanese-American judoka and Greco-Roman wrestler. He was the 1969 AAU National Lightweight Judo Champion, the 1976 AAU National Greco-Roman, and the 1980 AAU National Masters Judo Champion. In the US National championships, Oishi earned a Silver medal in 1966 and a Gold in 1969.

Born in Japan, Oishi moved from Tokyo to New York as an art student, where in 1969 he opened a judo school. He was revolutionary in his use of co-ed training. He holds an 8th dan black belt in judo.

== Filmography ==
- Black Rain (1989) - Sato's Yakuza
- Scenes from a Mall (1991) - Man on Carphone
- Other People's Money (1991) - Japanese Businessman
- Old Dogs (2009) - Japanese Executive
