= Graphic.ly =

Defunct website

Graphicly
- Company type: Private
- Founded: 2007
- Headquarters: Boulder, Colorado, USA
- Key people: Micah Baldwin; (CEO, Co-Founder); Kevin Mann; (Founder and Chief Scientist)
- Website: Graphicly.com

Graphicly (often stylized as Graphic.ly) was a platform for publishers which offered work flow integration, self-publishing, digital distribution, conversion, and promotion for digital content. Launched by Kevin Mann and Micah Baldwin, the website was initially a platform for digital comic books, but later added support for children's books, art books, and magazines. Graphicly accumulated more than 3,500 publishers and more than 10,000 independent creators. The website hosted an active social community, allowing creators and fans to interact directly. Graphicly shut down in May 2014, and some of its key staff moved on to fellow digital publisher Blurb.

== History ==
Graphicly was founded in 2007 as "Take Comics" by Kevin Mann. The website was part the 2009 class of TechStars, a startup accelerator. Micah Baldwin had been a mentor at TechStars since 2007, and after mentoring the Graphicly team through the program, joined the company as founder and CEO.

Steve Ballmer gave the first public demo of Graphicly during Microsoft’s keynote presentation at the 2010 Consumer Electronics Show.

The company raised a $1.2 million seed round in January 2010, led by DFJ Mercury, with additional investments from Starz Media, David Cohen, Dave McClure, Paige Craig, Jake Nickell, and Chris Sacca. Over 600,000 copies of Graphicly's mobile applications had been downloaded in the first five months of 2010. In January 2011, Graphicly raised an additional $3.8 million in a Series A round from a group led by DFJ Mercury with additional investments from 500 Startups, Dundee VC, Ludlow Ventures, and Venture51. In addition to the established angel investors, Graphicly's advisors included Tim Ferriss, Jay Adelson, and Gary Vaynerchuk.

In February 2010, Graphicly acquired iFanboy, a comic book community and news platform. This bolstered the interactive elements of their site, which had already pioneered how comic books were read and shared. The purchase did not last and in January 2013, iFanboy split from Graphically in a joint decision between the site and the company. In November 2011, Graphicly acquired Double Feature, a mobile comics reader application.

In 2012, the Graphic.ly comics app was discontinued and the company focused on digital conversion and distribution service: For an upfront fee, the company would convert a comic and distribute it to digital platforms, and then planned to give proceeds (after fees) to the comic owner.

In January 2013, Graphicly raised an additional $1 million in funding, bringing the total venture capital investment to $6 million.

In April 2014, Graphicly officially shut its doors, replacing its website with a notice informing visitors of such. Key employees from the company were hired by Blurb, a self-publishing agency similar in aim to Graphicly. Many publishers who had published their works through Graphicly were offered to move their business to Blurb.

Some of the independent creators were never paid for the proceeds from their published comics.

== Description ==
Baldwin described the initial vision for Graphicly as iTunes for comic books. The company allowed comic book creators to distribute their content digitally through Graphicly's native app, which is available for the iPhone, iPad, and Android devices.

The following year, Graphicly shifted the company's focus to their digital publishing platform, which allows authors and publishers to release their books on platforms like the iBookstore, Amazon's Kindle Store, the Kobo Store, and Barnes & Noble's Nook Store. Baldwin noted that although Graphicly's marketplace strategy had proved successful, the company focused mainly on marketing the highest-selling comics like Spider-Man and X-Men, a departure from their initial goal of helping all publishers, especially independent publishers, gain an audience. In January 2012, the company unveiled an all-in-one self-publishing platform with automated tools that can convert, distribute and promote image-based content. The platform also offers real-time analytics integration, allowing creators to track their content across all the marketplaces.

=== Business Model ===
Publishers paid a flat fee to Graphicly and retained full ownership of the revenue stream afterwards. In the first week after the new platform was released, the company signed up over 1,500 authors and publishers at an average of $650. Graphicly's user base doubled in the first 6 months after the launch of the new distribution options. The transition also attracted content creators outside of comic books, and at one time 40% of all books submitted through Graphicly were non-comics.

Together, this led to higher sales for Graphicly's content creators, and sales outpace the old Graphicly app 5 to 1. In 2011, more than one book was being downloaded every minute from Graphicly.

=== Community ===
Graphicly hosted an active social community which allowed users to comment within the pages of the digital books on the story, artwork, cover art, and overall experience. The discussion allowed creators and fans to connect directly, and greatly increased Graphicly's reader engagement. The website featured a social stream, where users could see activity including recent purchases, comments, and share recent favorites with other users. Baldwin called the community the biggest driver of growth for Graphicly.
