= Raskol gangs =

Term for criminal gangs in Papua New Guinea

Raskol Gangs
- Raskol
- Founding location: Port Moresby
- Years active: 1970s-present
- Territory: Urban areas of Papua New Guinea, mainly Port Moresby, Lae, Mount Hagen and Goroka
- Ethnicity: Papuans, Melanesians
- Membership: Unknown ~1000´s
- Activities: Armed robbery, Carjacking, Extortion, Drug Trafficking, Contract killing, Rape, among other illegal activities

Raskol is a generic term for a criminal or group of criminals in Papua New Guinea ("PNG"), primarily in the larger cities, including Port Moresby and Lae. Raskol is a Tok Pisin (Pidgin English) word derived from the English word rascal and is currently used in Papua New Guinea to refer to gang members or criminals in general.

== History ==
Raskol gangs first emerged in Port Moresby in the 1970s, largely associated with the growth of urban squatter settlements in Port Moresby that consisted of recent migrants from the rural areas of the country and their children. Unemployment was (and remains) high in the settlements, with most employment in the informal sector, and educational opportunities very limited.

Similar to criminal gangs in western urban centres such as Los Angeles, London, and Paris, criminal gangs emerged as a mechanism through which uneducated and unemployed urban youth in PNG sought a sense of self-worth and security by associating with others who share their deprivation. In a country where betel nut, marijuana, and homebrew alcohol are widely accessible at an early age, these drugs are an often-cited contributor to the erratic behaviour of raskol gangs. Widespread alcoholism due to cultural attitudes towards alcoholism may also be a contributor. Many PNG criminal law enforcement officials accept drunkenness as a legal defence in domestic violence cases.

Over the years, raskol gang activities have evolved from opportunistic incidents of small scale theft or breaking and entering to more organised criminal activity including serving as middlemen in the marijuana trade both within PNG and between PNG and Australia, as well as becoming increasingly politicised as the instrument of various political powers. The growth of squatter settlements in Lae and Port Moresby has led to a corresponding increase in the number and size of raskol gangs.

== Rape ==
In urban areas, particularly slum areas, Raskol gangs often require raping women for initiation reasons. Peter Moses, one of the leaders of the "Dirty Dons 585" Raskol gang, stated that raping women was a “must” for the young members of the gang. In rural areas, when a boy wants to become a man, he may go to an enemy village and kill a pig to be accepted as an adult, while in the cities "women have replaced pigs." Moses, who claimed to have raped more than 30 women himself, said, “And it is better if a boy kills her afterwards; there will be less problems with the police."
