= The Birthday Massacre discography =

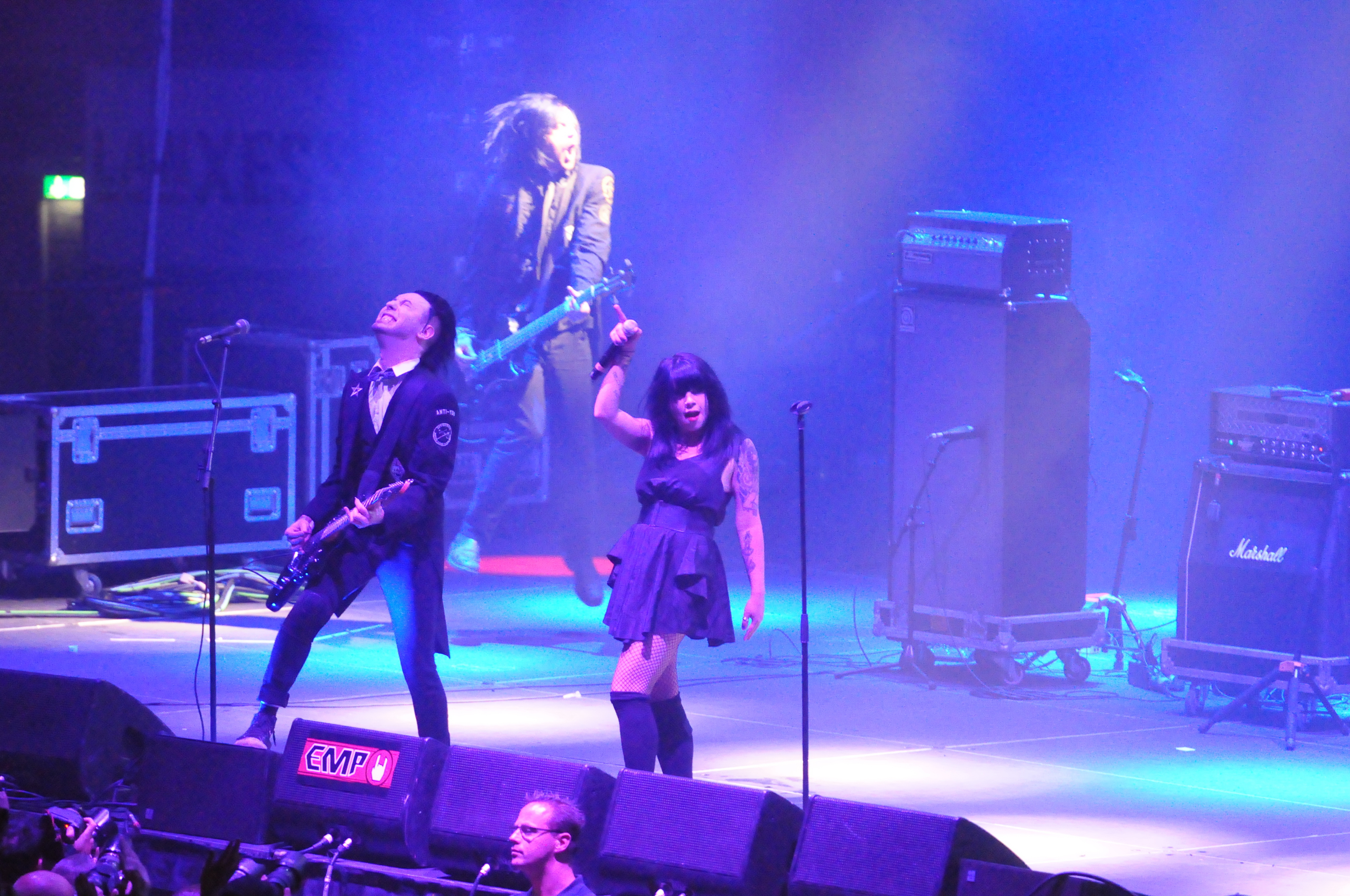
- The Birthday Massacre in 2015
- Studio albums: 9
- Extended plays: 3
- Live albums: 1
- Singles: 1
- Video albums: 2
- Music videos: 8

The discography of The Birthday Massacre consists of nine studio albums, one live album, two video albums, three extended plays, one single and eight music videos.

The band's debut studio album, Nothing and Nowhere, was independently recorded and distributed on May 31, 2002 on the band's official website, but was re-released on CD again with new sleeve art in 2004 and re-released again on June 5, 2007 via Metropolis Records. It was recorded and mixed by J. Aslan and Rainbow with album artwork by Jurgen Elas and Simon Bondar. The album contains songs from previous Imagica demos, which would follow a long tradition of the band remixing new versions of old songs.

The Birthday Massacre followed up Nothing and Nowhere with a second studio album, titled Violet. It was originally released as an EP on October 25, 2004 and re-released in 2005 as an LP with some added tracks from the debut.
The album was mixed by Rainbow, J. Aslan, M. Falcore, George Seara, mastered by Noah Nimitz, and engineered by Brett Carruthers. Walking with Strangers was released as the band's third studio album on September 10, 2007. It was produced and engineered by Dave Ogilvie. The album debuted at number thirty-two on the Billboard Independent Albums chart. "Red Stars" was released as the album's lead single on August 21, 2007.

Looking Glass was released as an EP on May 6, 2008, containing a music video of the Dan Ouellette-directed video for the title track. The EP peaked at number twenty-four on the Billboard Dance/Electronic Albums chart. The Birthday Massacre released Pins and Needles on September 14, 2010. It became their first album to chart on the Billboard 200. It also debuted and peaked at number ninety-six in Germany. The band later released an EP, Imaginary Monsters. The EP includes a music video directed by M. Falcore and Rue Morgue. A fifth studio album, Hide and Seek, followed in 2012, debuting and peaking at number one hundred and thirty-eight on the Billboard 200 and number ninety-four in Germany. In April 2013, a video for "One Promise" directed by Michelle Hung Tsz Ching was selected among over one hundred and fifty entries as an official music video for Hide and Seek. The band's sixth album Superstition was released on November 11, 2014. The band's seventh album Under Your Spell was released on June 9, 2017. The band's eighth album "Diamonds" was released March 27, 2020. The band's ninth album Fascination was released on February 18, 2022.

== Albums ==
=== Studio albums ===
List of studio albums, with selected chart positions
Title	Album details	Peak chart positions						
Title	Album details	US	US Dance	US Ind.	US Heat.	US Rock	US Alt.	GER
Nothing and Nowhere	Released: July 23, 2002; Label: Metropolis Records; Formats: CD, digital download	—	—	—	—	—	—	—
Violet	Released: August 9, 2005; Label: Metropolis Records, Repo; Formats: CD, digital download	—	—	—	—	—	—	—
Walking with Strangers	Released: September 10, 2007; Label: Metropolis Records, Repo; Formats: CD, digital download	—	—	32	10	—	—	—
Pins and Needles	Released: September 14, 2010; Label: Metropolis Records; Formats: CD, digital download	152	—	34	6	—	—	96
Hide and Seek	Released: October 9, 2012; Label: Metropolis Records; Formats: CD, vinyl, digital download	138	7	36	3	—	—	94
Superstition	Released: November 11, 2014; Label: Metropolis Records; Formats: CD, vinyl, digital download	143	—	14	2	23	10	—
Under Your Spell	Released: June 9, 2017; Label: Metropolis Records; Formats: CD, vinyl, digital download	157	—	7	2	37	20	—
Diamonds	Released: March 27, 2020; Label: Metropolis Records; Formats: CD, vinyl, digital download	—	—	—	—	—	—	—
Fascination	Released: February 18, 2022; Label: Metropolis Records; Formats: CD, vinyl, digital download	—	—	—	—	—	—	—
Pathways	Released: April 11, 2025; Label: Metropolis Records; Formats: CD, vinyl, digital download	—	—	—	—	—	—	—
"—" denotes a recording that did not chart or was not released in that territory.

=== Compilation albums ===
List of compilation albums
Title	Album details
Imagica	Released: July 22, 2016; Label: Metropolis; Formats: CD, Vinyl, digital download

=== Live albums ===
List of live albums
Title	Album details
Show and Tell	Released: May 5, 2009; Label: Metropolis; Formats: CD, digital download

=== Demo albums ===
List of demo albums
Title	Album details
Imagica (Demo 1)	Released: 2000; Formats: CD
Imagica (Demo 2)	Released: 2001; Formats: CD

=== Video albums ===
List of video albums
Title	Album details
Blue	Released: August 8, 2005; Label: Metropolis, Repo; Formats: DVD
Show and Tell	Released: February 9, 2010; Label: Metropolis, Repo; Formats: DVD

== Extended plays ==
List of extended plays
Title	EP details	Peak chart positions	
Title	EP details	US Dance	US Heat.
Looking Glass	Released: May 6, 2008; Label: Metropolis; Formats: CD, digital download	24	—
Imaginary Monsters	Released: August 9, 2011; Label: Metropolis; Formats: CD, digital download	16	30

== Singles ==
List of singles, showing year released and album name
Title	Year	Album
"Red Stars"	2007	Walking with Strangers

== Music videos ==
List of music videos, showing year released, director, and album.
Title	Year	Director(s)	Album
"Nevermind"	2005	Steve Jones	Violet
"Blue"	2005	Dan Ouellette	Violet
"Looking Glass"	2008	Dan Ouellette	Walking With Strangers
"In the Dark"	2010	M. Falcore and Rue Morgue	Pins and Needles
"One Promise"	2013	Michelle Hung Tsz Ching	Hide and Seek
"Beyond"	2014	Dan Ouellette	Superstition
"Superstition"	2015	Shannon Hanmer	Superstition
"One"	2017	Chris Nash	Under Your Spell
"Precious Hearts"	2023	Neal Reed	Fascination

Notes

- "Nevermind" is a live performance music video.
- "One Promise" was the chosen winner of a music video fan-submission contest held for the "Hide and Seek" album.
- "Superstition" was filmed in the band's rehearsal space, directed by M. Falcore's sister, Shannon.

== Other appearances ==
=== Remixes ===
List of remixes by The Birthday Massacre including the title, artist remixed, year released, and album name.
Title	Year	Artist	Album
"Fallen Hero (Jekyll&Hyde Mix by The Birthday Massacre)"	2005	Funker Vogt	Fallen Hero
"Make a Star (After Party Mix by The Birthday Massacre)"	2006	Dope Stars Inc.	Make A Star
"Straight To Video (Dramaclub Mix by The Birthday Massacre)"	2006	Mindless Self Indulgence	Straight To Video
"The Knight Murders (featuring Chibi) (The Birthday Massacre Remix)"	2007	Vanity Beach	Red Stars
"Never Wanted To Dance (The Birthday Massacre Pansy Mix with guest vocals by Chibi)"	2008	Mindless Self Indulgence	Never Wanted to Dance
"Last Daze (Funland Mix by The Birthday Massacre)"	2009	Left Spine Down	Voltage 2.3: Remixed and Revisited
"Go for the Throat (The Birthday Massacre Remix)"	2009	September Mourning	N/A
"Tonight (The Birthday Massacre Remix)"	2011	SKOLD	Tonight
"Superjet (The Birthday Massacre Remix)"	2012	Raggedy Angry	Dead Beats

Notes

- "Last Daze" was covered and remixed by The Birthday Massacre with new vocals by Chibi and additional guitars by Rainbow and Falcore.

=== Features/Collaborations ===
List of songs featuring Chibi/The Birthday Massacre and their collaborations. Including the title, main artist, year released, and album name..
Title	Year	Artist	Album
"The Knight Murders (featuring Chibi)"	2003	Vanity Beach	Nights of the New
"Mouth To Mouth (featuring Chibi)"	2009	Kill Hannah	Wake Up The Sleepers
"Hurt You (featuring Chibi)"	2009	Jim Johnston (For WWE)	Non-album release.
"Hole (featuring Chibi)"	2011	The Dreaming	Puppet
"All For You (featuring Chibi)"	2012	Dean Garcia	Das Haus Volume One
"Until The End (featuring Chibi)"	2013	Army of the Universe	Until The End
"Until The End (featuring Chibi) (Albert Vorne Remix)"	2013	Army of the Universe	Until The End
"Until The End (featuring Chibi)"	2013	Army of the Universe	The Hipster Sacrifice
"Wake Up (featuring Chibi)"	2014	Voltaire	Raised by Bats

Notes

- "All For You" is a collaboration of Dean Garcia, Chibi and Rainbow.
- The Albert Vorne remix of "Until The End" exclusively features only Chibi's vocals for the entire track.
