= Pins and Needles (The Birthday Massacre album) =

Studio album by The Birthday Massacre
- Released: September 14, 2010
- Recorded: Dire Studios Toronto, Ontario; The Basement Dundas, Ontario
- Genre: Electronic rock; dark wave
- Length: 41:57
- Label: Metropolis Records
- Producer: Rainbow and M. Falcore

The Birthday Massacre chronology
Show and Tell (2009/2010)	Pins and Needles (2010)	Imaginary Monsters (2011)

Singles from Pins and Needles
- 1. "In the Dark" Released: September 7, 2010

Professional ratings
Review scores
Source	Rating

Pins and Needles is the fourth studio album by Canadian rock band The Birthday Massacre. The album was released on September 14, 2010. The first single and video from the album, "In the Dark," premiered on September 7, 2010, directed and edited by M.Falcore and Rodrigo Gudiño of Rue Morgue.

== Track listing ==
All tracks written and performed by Chibi, Rainbow, Michael Falcore, O.E..

No.	Title	Length
1.	"In the Dark"	3:42
2.	"Always"	4:11
3.	"Pale"	3:58
4.	"Control"	3:20
5.	"Shallow Grave"	3:47
6.	"Sideways"	3:25
7.	"Midnight"	3:43
8.	"Pins and Needles"	4:19
9.	"Two Hearts"	3:20
10.	"Sleepwalking"	3:49
11.	"Secret"	4:23
Total length:		39:57

== Personnel ==
- The band:
  - Chibi - lead vocals
  - Rainbow - rhythm guitar, synth/percussion programming, backing vocals
  - Michael Falcore - lead guitar, synth/percussion programming
  - O.E. - bass, backing vocals
  - Rhim - drums
  - Owen - keyboards
- Rainbow and M. Falcore - producing and recording
- Dave "Rave" Ogilvie and Rainbow - mixing
- Dave "Rave" Ogilvie - mix engineer
- Brock McFarlane - assistant mix engineer
- Noah Mintz - mastering
- Kevin James Maher - programming and editing
- Mixed At: Mushroom Studios (Vancouver, Canada) & Dire Studios (Toronto, Canada)
- Mastered At: Lacquer Channel
- Design Artwork: Vincent Marcone, Cole Sullivan, James Furlong, Natalie Shau

== Reviews ==
- Allmusic link
- Review Rinse Repeat link
- Sputnikmusic link
- Musicfolio.com link
- Absolutepunknet (69%) link

== Charts ==
On the issue date of September 23, 2010, Pins And Needles debuted at number 6 on the Billboard Top Heatseekers chart and number 152 on the Top 200 chart. It stayed on the Heatseekers chart for 3 weeks.

Chart	Peak position
Deutsche Alternative Charts	1
German Newcomer Chart	7
US Billboard 200	152
US Top Heatseekers	6
US Independent Albums	34

== Notes ==
Album artwork was created by illustrator and director Vincent Marcone of Johnny Hollow and MyPetSkeleton.com.

The Album was recorded in a basement studio in Dundas, Ontario, hometown of Rainbow and M.Falcore.
