= Imagica (album) =

Compilation album by The Birthday Massacre
- Released: July 22, 2016
- Recorded: 1998–2001
- Genre: Electronic rock; dark wave
- Label: Metropolis

The Birthday Massacre chronology
| Superstition (2014) | Imagica (2016) | Under Your Spell (2017) |

Imagica is the first compilation album from The Birthday Massacre. The album features a collection of 11 remastered tracks from the original Imagica 4-track demos and was released July 22, 2016. Three songs on the album; "Open Your Heart", "From Out of Nowhere", and "Dead" were never previously released to the public.

== Track listing ==
| No. | Title | Length |
|---|---|---|
| 1. | "Over" | 4:03 |
| 2. | "Remember Me" | 4:59 |
| 3. | "Under the Stairs" | 3:59 |
| 4. | "The Birthday Massacre" | 3:35 |
| 5. | "Nothing and Nowhere" | 4:16 |
| 6. | "Queen of Hearts" | 3:42 |
| 7. | "Night Time" | 5:13 |
| 8. | "Play Dead" | 3:23 |
| 9. | "Open Your Heart" (Madonna Cover) | 3:46 |
| 10. | "From Out of Nowhere" (Faith No More Cover) | 3:14 |
| 11. | "Dead" | 4:05 |
| Total length: | | 44:16 |

Notes

- Studio versions of "Over", "Under the Stairs", and "The Birthday Massacre" (re-titled "Happy Birthday") appear on the band's debut album, Nothing and Nowhere.
- Studio versions of "The Birthday Massacre" (re-titled "Happy Birthday") and "Play Dead" appear on the album Violet.
- A studio version of "Remember Me" appears on the album Walking with Strangers.
