= Under Your Spell =

Under Your Spell may refer to:

- Under Your Spell, a 1936 American film
- Under Your Spell, a 1999 album by Tinga Stewart
- Under Your Spell, a 2017 album by The Birthday Massacre
- "Under Your Spell", a 1986 song by Bob Dylan from the album Knocked Out Loaded
- "Under Your Spell", a 1987 song by Cliff Richard from the album Always Guaranteed
- "Under Your Spell", a 1988 song by Candi & The Backbeat
- "Under Your Spell", a 1991 song by Mark Shaw
- "Under Your Spell", a 1993 song by Ronny Jordan
- "Under Your Spell", a 2009 song by Desire
- "Under Your Spell", a 2023 song by Snow Strippers, especially founding popularity online
- "Under Your Spell", a 2001 song from the Buffy the Vampire Slayer episode "Once More, with Feeling"

== See also ==
- "Under Your Spell Again", a song by Buck Owens
