= Alpha Galates =

Canadian progressive metal band

- Also known as: The Hollow
- Origin: Medicine Hat, Alberta, Canada
- Genres: Progressive metal
- Years active: 2001-2011
- Labels: EMI, Ladder Records, Swarm Theory Music
- Spinoffs: Most Non Heinous
- Past members: Matthew Wagner; Karen Wagner; Todd Lefever; Harmony; Phil Elliott; Colin Snortland; Rowan MacPhail; Adam Taylor

Alpha Galates, formerly The Hollow, was a Canadian progressive metal band that originated in Medicine Hat, Alberta and later became based in Toronto, Ontario.

Matthew von Wagner, his ex-wife, Karen Wagner, Adam Taylor and Todd Lefever formed The Hollow in 2001. The band released three albums: Natio in 2002, Vita in 2004, and, in 2006, ab Gehenna which was an independent, digital-only release. Another album, Obitus, was released on iTunes only. All of these albums were produced and mixed by Wagner, who also mixed and produced music for Ubiquitous Synergy Seeker, Crystal Castles and A Primitive Evolution.

Guitarist Adam Taylor, and drummer Colin Snortland (aka Nilock Lang) left the band. Singer Matthew von Wagner, (former drummer for pop punk band Racer 10), moved to drums. Karen Wagner remained on bass; Rowan MacPhail was added on guitar, and in 2006 Harmony was added on keyboards.

After EMI Music Canada president Deane Cameron saw the band at the Bovine Sex Club in Toronto, they signed to EMI in December, 2006 and began recording two new songs to be added to the album, which was originally called Obitus.

A Stimulus for Reason, which was produced by Wagner and mixed by Joe Barresi, was released February 19, 2008 under the band's new name, Alpha Galates. The album was released as a digipak album, and in a deluxe version packaged in a metal tin. This version contained three bonus tracks that were recorded and mixed by Wagner. It also contains a video for the track "Natio".

In January 2008, Alpha Galates filmed their video for "Standing", which was directed by Margaret Malandruccolo. It was based on the film "They Live" by John Carpenter. The video was added to the MuchLOUD station, and was also 'Loudtested' on Much Music.

Alpha Galates completed a Canadian tour with Grimskunk in March/April 2008, and toured central Canada with Threat Signal. They also played the 2008 Rock am Ring and Rock im Park festivals in Germany, Nova Rock 2008 in Austria, and Edgefest 2008 in Toronto. After playing a set of shows with the band 3, and Tubring in October 2009, the band took a 6-month break from performing in order to work on new material.

In June 2009, the band hired new drummer, Phil Elliot, who had had his own band, Born Destroyers. Wagner returned on rhythm guitar, which he had also played on all of the band's recordings, and MacPhail left the band. Alpha Galates set out on a set of shows around southern Ontario in November 2009.

The band began writing and recording their second album and debuted a new track called "Over It" at the Velvet Underground, in Toronto, on Nov 18, 2009, but never completed the album. The band dissolved in 2011, with Wagner and Harmony starting a new project called 'Most Non Heinous'.

Wagner died of pancreatic failure in July 2018. Snortland went on to play on an album for Three Days Grace; Elliott and MacPhail on albums by The Birthday Massacre.

In 2021, the band Melek-Tha independently released Synthese Des Forces, an 11-track album containing five Alpha Galates songs.

== Discography ==
- As The Hollow:
- Natio (2002), Ladder Records
- Vita (2004), Swarm Theory
  - ab Gehenna (2004), Independent
  - Obitus (2006), EMI Canada
- As Alpha Galates:
  - A Stimulus for Reason (2008), EMI Canada
  - Synthese Des Forces (2021), split with Melek-Tha, Independent
