= Blue (video) =

Video by The Birthday Massacre
- Released: August 8, 2005
- Recorded: 2005
- Genres: Electronic rock; dark wave
- Length: 5:51/4:41
- Label: Repo/Metropolis
- Director: Dan Ouellette
- Producer: The Birthday Massacre

The Birthday Massacre chronology
Violet (2004)	Blue (2005)	Walking with Strangers (2007)

Blue is the first DVD by Canadian electronic rock band, The Birthday Massacre. The DVD consist of the Dan Ouellette and Robert Morris created video Blue and also includes behind-the-scenes footage, interviews, a studio performance of "Nevermind," as well as live performances of "Violet" and "Video Kid" by Steve Jones. It was released in the United States and Canada on August 1, 2005, by Repo Records and Metropolis Records. The title video was directed by Dan Ouellette, who later directed the band's Looking Glass video and has directed and/or done production work for videos by (among others) David Bowie and Android Lust. The video's special effects were created by Ouellette and Robert Morris, with the featured dolls and puppets created by Scott Radke.

"Nevermind" was directed by Steve Jones of Toronto, with effects by Mike Spicer.

"Violet" is a live performance video captured during the Violet EP release party on July 31, 2004, at the 360 Club in Toronto.

“Video Kid” is an early video of the band recorded in Toronto in September 2002. This video had been reworked to contain the 2005 version of the song.

Blue is the first single of their album Violet. It was the third video from the band and had their highest budget to date.

== Features ==
Main Feature :

- 01. Blue (m. Bo by. Nlue)

Extra Features :

- 02. Nevermind (music video)
- 03. Violet (live video)
- 04. Video Kid (live video)
- 05. The making of Blue (behind-the-scenes footage)

Plus

- blue gallery
- Photo gallery
- Credit section
- Dan Ouellette gallery
- Robert Morris gallery
- Scott Radke gallery

== Format ==
- NTSC 4:3 or PAL 4:3
- DVD Regions 0 and 1
