= Show and Tell (The Birthday Massacre album) =

Live album by The Birthday Massacre
- Released: 5 May 2009
- Recorded: Hamburg, Germany
- Genre: Electronic rock; dark wave
- Length: 63:24
- Label: Metropolis

The Birthday Massacre chronology
Looking Glass EP (2008)	Show and Tell (2009)	Pins and Needles (2010)

DVD Version

Show and Tell is the first live album by the Canadian band, The Birthday Massacre. It was recorded at Knust music club in Hamburg, Germany in Autumn 2007, and the album was released during Spring 2009. A DVD portion was released later in Europe (2009) and North America (2010).

== Track listing ==
No.	Title	Length
1.	"Before Dark (Intro)"	1:25
2.	"Video Kid"	4:27
3.	"Lovers End"	4:20
4.	"Goodnight"	4:21
5.	"Falling Down"	4:13
6.	"Violet"	3:38
7.	"Red Stars"	3:49
8.	"Looking Glass"	4:22
9.	"Remember Me"	4:04
10.	"Unfamiliar"	3:26
11.	"Walking With Strangers"	3:52
12.	"Weekend"	3:53
13.	"Horror Show"	4:07
14.	"Kill the Lights"	4:35
15.	"Blue"	4:30
16.	"Happy Birthday"	4:13

== DVD ==
A Show and Tell DVD was released in Europe on October 2, 2009 and in North America on February 9, 2010. This DVD is an entire live performance from the band's European Walking With Strangers tour in 2007. It was shot in Hamburg, Germany. In addition, the DVD contains footage of the band performing on the German festival M'era Luna in 2005 and 2006. Note: The European DVD version contains both M'era Luna performances, but the North American release of the DVD contains the 2005 performance.

=== Features ===
Main Feature :

- 01. Hamburg, Germany (Live):

Track Listing:

1. "Before Dark (Intro)" - 1:26
2. "Video Kid" - 4:28
3. "Lovers End" - 4:20
4. "Goodnight" - 4:21
5. "Falling Down" - 4:14
6. "Violet" - 3:39
7. "Red Stars" - 3:50
8. "Looking Glass" - 4:23
9. "Remember Me" - 4:05
10. "Unfamiliar" - 3:26
11. "Walking With Strangers" - 3:53
12. "Weekend" - 3:54
13. "Horror Show" - 4:07
14. "Kill the Lights" - 4:36
15. "Blue" - 4:31
16. "Happy Birthday" - 4:13

Extra Features :

- 01. M'era Luna 2005 (live)
- 02. M'era Luna 2006 (live)
- 03. Picture Gallery
- 04. Interview

=== Format ===
- NTSC 4:3 and PAL 4:3
- DVD Regions 0 and 1

== Members ==
- Chibi – Vocals
- Rainbow – Guitar, Vocals
- Michael Falcore – Guitar
- Owen – Keyboards
- O.E. – Bass, Vocals
- Rhim – Drums

== Notes ==
Recorded and produced by Crazyclip.TV

Chibi once stated in an interview that she had a "horrible cold while it was recorded."
