= It Dreams =

Studio album by Jakalope
- Released: October 26, 2004
- Recorded: Warehouse Studios, Vancouver
- Genres: Pop rock, industrial
- Length: 45:12
- Label: Orange Record Label
- Producers: Dave Ogilvie, Anthony Valcic, Trent Reznor, Jamey Koch

Jakalope chronology
It Dreams (2004)	Born 4 (2006)

Professional ratings
Review scores
Source	Rating
Kerrang!	4/5 stars
Release Magazine	4/10 stars
Tiny Mix Tapes	2/5 stars

It Dreams is the debut album by Jakalope, released on October 26, 2004.

The music videos made for the album are known for the clone and hybrid theme connected to the band. Videos featuring Dave Ogilvie as a Dr. Evar and Katie B presented a sort of story for fans to follow, bolstered by a site contest which allowed fans insight into the so-called 'Jakalope world', and hinted at the back story of Dr. Evar and Katie's characters. A large part of the plot was left to the interpretation of fans in the end, especially concerning the Katie B character.

As a CD, this album is only available as an import from Canada and Japan. However, the album is available as a download from iTunes in both the United States and Canada.

Samples of the music, along with videos, can be found at Jakalope's web site.

== Track listing ==
No.	Title	Writer(s)	Length
1.	"Feel It"	Jamey Koch, Trent Reznor	3:53
2.	"Creeper (Coming for You)"	Dan Moyse, Marc Belke	3:27
3.	"Pretty Life"	Phil Caivano	3:37
4.	"Go Away"	Andrew Scott, Chris Murphy, Dan Moyse, Phil Western, Trent Reznor	3:33
5.	"Tell Me Why" (additional production by Phil Western)	Jamey Koch, Matthew Warhurst, Phil Western, Sarah Kendrick	4:34
6.	"Don't Cry"	Jamey Koch	3:59
7.	"Screecher"	Jamey Koch	2:36
8.	"Come On"	Pete Mills	3:28
9.	"Light After Night" (additional production by Daryn Barry)	Andrew Scott, Chris Murphy, Lindy, Phil Caivano, Tim Welch, Trevor Yuile	3:40
10.	"Nothing Nowhere"	Phil Western, Sean Stubbs	4:58
11.	"Badream"	Matthew Warhurst, Phil Western, Trent Reznor	3:23
12.	"House of Ill Trepidation" (additional production by Phil Western)	Jamey Koch, Phil Western	4:06
Total length:			45:12

Japanese bonus tracks
No.	Title	Writer(s)	Length
13.	"Pretty Life" (CHR Remix)	Phil Caivano	3:32
14.	"Pretty Life" (Death Remix)	Phil Caivano	4:30

== Personnel ==
Adapted from Discogs.

- Jim McGrath – additional arrangements
- Vincent Marcone – art direction
- Rosemary Ogilvie – artwork
- Trent Reznor – co-producer
- Jamey Koch – co-producer, mixing
- I Braineater – logo design
- Aubrey Winfield – executive producer
- Tom Baker – mastering
- Phil Western – additional mixing
- Daryn Barry, John Nazario – mixing assistants (Orange Lounge)
- Mike Cashin, Pete MacLaggan – mixing assistants (Warehouse)
- Dave Ogilvie – recording, production, mixing, songwriter
- Anthony Valcic – recording, production, mixing
- Bryan Gallant – assistant recording
- Kirk McNally – assistant recording
