= The Birthday Massacre =

Canadian band

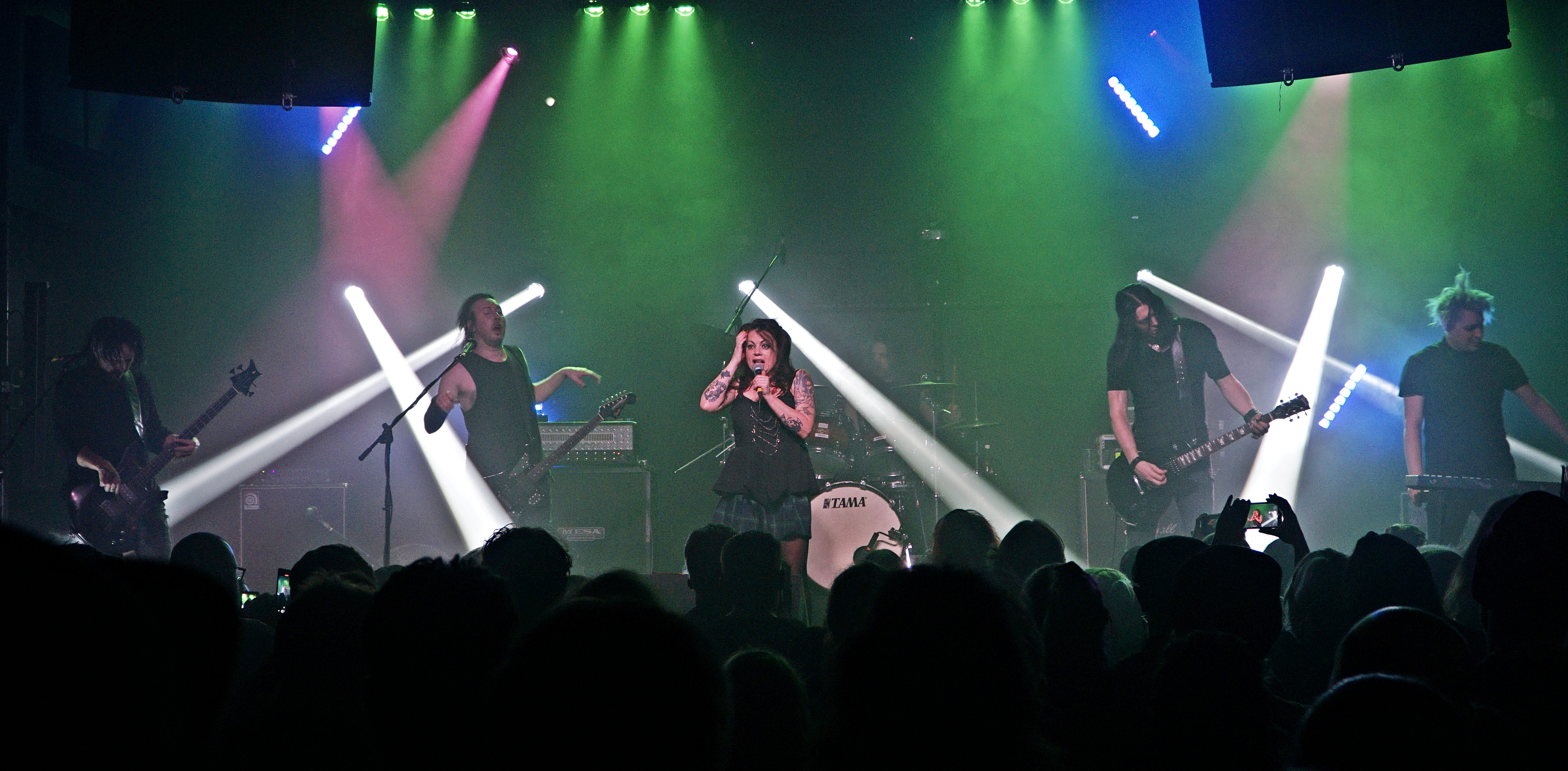
- The Birthday Massacre in 2022

Background information
- Also known as: Imagica (1999–2002), TBM
- Origin: London, Ontario, Canada
- Genres: Electronic rock; dark wave
- Years active: 1999–present
- Labels: Metropolis; Repo
- Members: Sara 'Chibi' Taylor; Michael Rainbow; Michael Falcore; Owen Mackinder; Philip Elliot; Brett Carruthers
- Past members: O.E; Adm; Dank; Aslan Osiris; Rhim; Nate Manor
- Website: thebirthdaymassacre.com

The Birthday Massacre (abbreviated TBM) is a Canadian rock band formed in 1999 in London, Ontario and currently based in Toronto. The current lineup consists of lead vocalist Sara 'Chibi' Taylor, rhythm guitarist Michael Rainbow, lead guitarist Michael Falcore, keyboardist Owen Mackinder, drummer Philip Elliott, and bassist Brett Carruthers.

The band was originally named Imagica, inspired by the 1991 fantasy novel Imajica by Clive Barker. In 2002, they changed their name to The Birthday Massacre after one of their earlier songs, in order to avoid confusion with another group. The song "The Birthday Massacre" was then renamed "Happy Birthday". According to their vocalist Chibi: "It kind of works well for the music that we're making. Sort of contrasty, you know? Birthday, and massacre. Light, and dark. Cute, and evil."

The band has released ten studio albums: Nothing and Nowhere (2002), Violet (2005), Walking with Strangers (2007), Pins and Needles (2010), Hide and Seek (2012), Superstition (2014), Under Your Spell (2017), Diamonds (2020), Fascination (2022), and Pathways (2025).

They also issued the DVD Blue (2005), the live album/DVD Show and Tell (2009), the demo album Imagica, and the EPs Violet (2004), Looking Glass (2008), and Imaginary Monsters (2011).

== History ==
=== Imagica (1999–2001) ===
The group originated in London, Ontario, under the name 'Imagica', with members using pseudonyms and nicknames instead of their birth names. The group's original lineup formed when Michael Rainbow met Chibi at Fanshawe College, who was studying in the same fine-arts program. Rainbow recruited childhood friend Michael Falcore to join on guitar; they had already been recording music together in high school. Aslan, who was also attending the same college, became roommates with Rainbow and joined on bass. In mid 2000, Dank, a long-time friend of Chibi's, joined to play live keyboards but left the group shortly before they relocated to Toronto.

After months of rehearsals and writing songs, they played their first gig on October 28, 2000, at Diversity night club in London. The band released a seven-song limited-edition demo CD at the show which had been recorded on a four-track cassette recorder during a time when the group was recording cover songs for fun. There were 40 hand-numbered copies of the demo which included the first recorded version of the song "The Birthday Massacre" (later renamed "Happy Birthday").

During this time, the band also met Rhim, Owen and Brett Carruthers who all attended the same college. In October 2006, Terry McManus, Professor of Music Business and Entertainment Law at Fanshawe College, joined as the band's personal manager.

The band has always described itself as an audio-visual project. In a 2009 interview, when asked about why they had started the band, Rainbow stated: "I think more than just being a band, it's a way to sort of incorporate, not just music, but other things. So I think more so than just music, the idea of having a band, and being able to perform, and being able to do artwork, to do music... all these different avenues." Neither Rainbow, Chibi nor Michael Falcore had been in any previous bands and said that the group formed naturally as a result of spending time together as friends.

=== Nothing & Nowhere (2001–2003) ===
In 2001, the band relocated to Toronto, and began recording a new album which they announced would be available in another limited edition of 500 to 1,000.

Shortly before releasing the CD, the band changed their name from 'Imagica' to 'The Birthday Massacre' in order to avoid confusion with a California death metal band with the same name. The band chose the name because people were already familiar with the song of the same title.

In July 2002, The Birthday Massacre independently released a limited-edition CD entitled Nothing and Nowhere. In 2003, Adm joined the band on live keyboards and O.E left to focus on his own band, Tepid Lust (later to become Isle of Dogs).

The band began playing more live shows in London, Toronto, Oshawa and Montreal. Rhim was drumming for the band during these years, rotating between playing for fellow London band Aphasia but, on February 9, 2005, posted on his LiveJournal that he was a permanent member of The Birthday Massacre and that the band has his "110% unwavering, full-throttle, metronomic fabulousness... now 24-7."

2003 also saw the creation of the band's Flash website NothingAndNowhere.com, designed by Aslan and the band which included unreleased music and hidden objects throughout the site.

While studying fine arts, the group learned about color theory and chose the color violet to represent the band's themes. Rainbow said in an early interview: "Violet is the color of the tragic comedy. We associate it with fantasy and melancholy. These themes make up much of the band's lyrical inspiration. The color also mirrors our sound dynamic. Our music mixes contrasting elements. In turn, violet is the sum of two contrasting colors: Red and Blue." The band established their signature sound and visuals during this time, and when they signed to their labels, retained complete artistic freedom.

=== Violet (2004–2006) ===
On July 20, 2004, the Birthday Massacre independently released their second album Violet, and at the end of the year, re-released Nothing and Nowhere with new sleeve artwork. In the fall of 2004, Kai Schmidt, former member of electronic group Funker Vogt, signed the band to his label, Repo Records, in Germany. Violet was reissued in Europe, including updated album art in a digipak case. Adm left the band shortly before it was signed to Repo and can be seen in the original group photo on the album but is absent in the reissue. In 2004, Brett Carruthers briefly joined the band on live keyboards. 2004 saw the band touring outside of Canada for the first time, playing New York, Ohio, Indiana, Michigan, Illinois, Virginia, Pennsylvania and Maryland and performing with American bands 51 Peg, Deadstar Assembly, Celldweller and Crossbreed.

In 2005, the band signed to Metropolis Records and re-released Violet. In August, the band began a series of international tours which took them to Germany, Switzerland, the Netherlands, Hungary, the Czech Republic, Belgium, Spain and the UK. Also in August, the band released a DVD with the video for Blue by Dan Ouellette. Owen joined on keyboards, first assuming the name Waffles, then O-en, then finally using his given name. Owen joined just after the Blue filming was completed and therefore missed making an appearance in the video. On New Year's Eve the band performed in Los Angeles, California, at Bar Sinister.

In early 2006, the Birthday Massacre toured North America, playing across Canada, the United States and Mexico on their 'Broken Minds' tour, sharing the stage with KMFDM, Schoolyard Heroes, Suicide City and the Start. They toured Europe again with bands Das Ich, Jesus on Extasy and Dope Stars Inc; playing in France, Italy, and at Poland's Castle Party 2006. Through its European debut, Violet ranked high in the alternative charts. The band made it onto the front pages of magazines, and performed at some of Germany's largest music festivals, including the annual Highfield and M'era Luna summer festivals. Also in 2006, the band recorded a remix of the song Straight to Video by Mindless Self Indulgence. Later in 2008, the band would record a second remix, this time of the song Never Wanted to Dance with the addition of Chibi's vocals.

=== Walking with Strangers, Looking Glass, and Show and Tell (2007–2009) ===
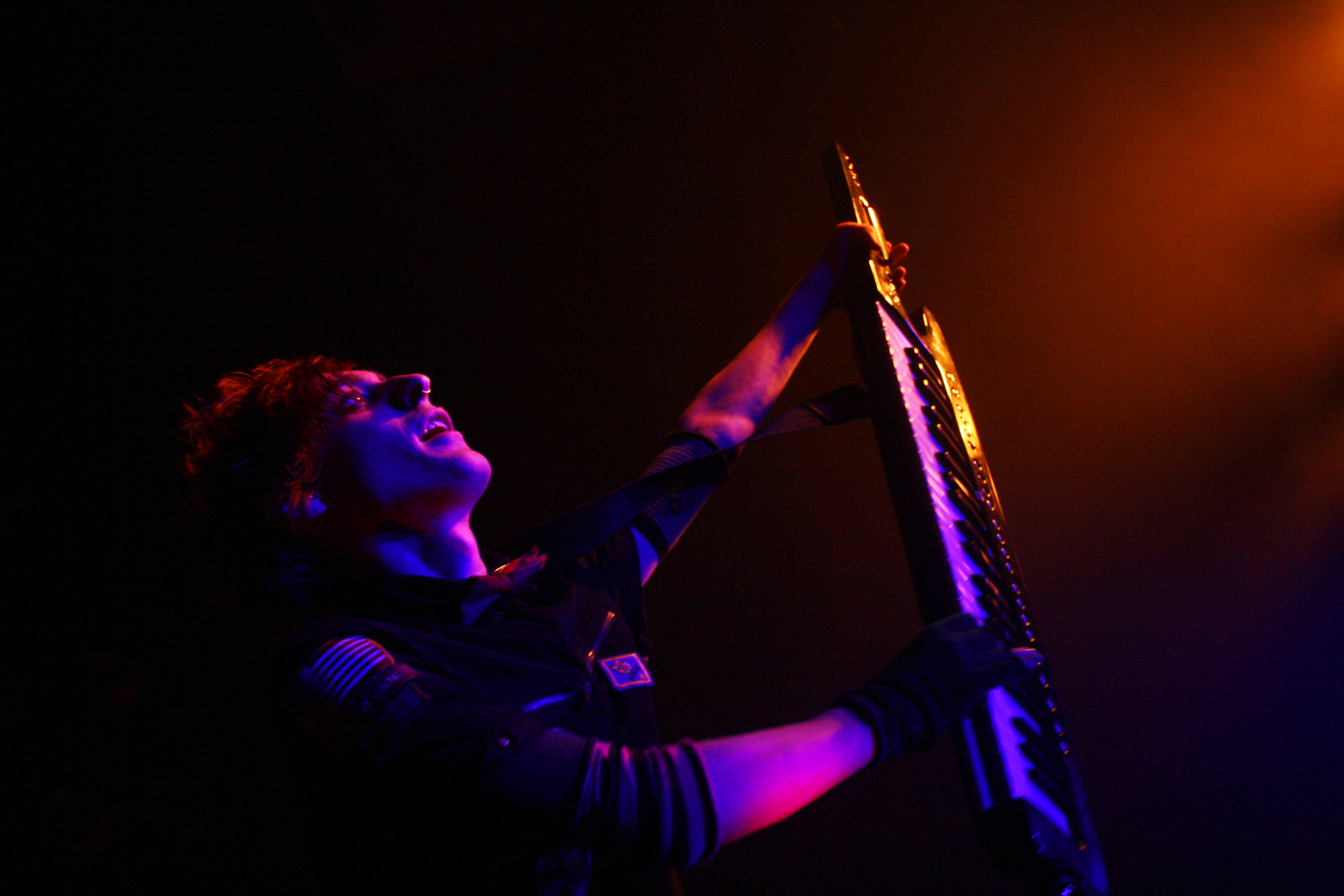
Owen Mackinder (keytar) performing at the Mod Club in Toronto, May 2009

On January 1, 2007, a demo version of the song "Kill the Lights" was released for streaming on the band's Vampirefreaks profile, which remained for several years the number one ranked profile for the highest number of listeners. In June, the band announced it was working on a new record with Canadian producer and engineer Dave "Rave" Ogilvie and that Aslan was leaving to start a new project and that O.E would be returning to the lineup on bass duties. In August, the band began planning a new video to be directed again by Dan Ouellette.

On September 11, 2007, the band released Walking with Strangers in North America, entering at No. 10 on the Billboard "Top Heatseekers" chart for September 29. The album was released in Europe on September 21 and in the UK on 22 October. Artwork was created by JUNO Award winner, Vincent Marcone of Johnny Hollow. In October and November, the band toured Europe with German band Psycho Luna, playing nineteen concerts across six countries, including headlining in Whitby and Vlissingen.

Primary filming of the Looking Glass video took place February 10–11, 2008, directed by Ouellette. Extras were culled from The Birthday Massacre's fan base and all 35 masks were handcrafted. The Looking Glass video was released on the band's official YouTube channel on April 1, 2008, and distributed as a video data file on the EP which was released in May 2008. It contained several remixes by electronic artists such as Dean Garcia, Jamie Miller and Dave Ogilvie. Beginning in June, the band embarked on a large American tour, opening up for Mindless Self Indulgence, and sharing shows with Julien-K, Fake Shark - Real Zombie!, London After Midnight and Combichrist. They would further tour America with bands Tub Ring, Hollowboy and Creature Feature. November 2008 also saw the band touring Australia for the first time.

On May 5, 2009, the band released their Show And Tell CD, featuring 16 live tracks from their show in Hamburg, Germany, filmed at Knust, which occurred during their Walking With Strangers Tour in 2007. The DVD portion of the show was released on October 2, 2009, in Europe and in North America on February 9, 2010. During the summer of 2009, Chibi recorded vocals for former WWE Diva Katie Lea Burchill's entrance theme, "Hurt You".

During the spring and summer of 2009, the band went on tour with bands I Am Ghost and Dommin in both North America and Europe. In late July 2009, the band was featured on a contest called 'Book The Band', at Virgin Mobile Festival, which took place online and allowed fans to vote repeatedly. On August 17, The Birthday Massacre was declared winner of the contest and was given 100 tickets to hand out to the most fanatic voters. They performed at the festival on August 30, 2009, held at the Merriweather Post Pavilion in Columbia, Maryland. Chibi stated in an interview, that since the band is unable to write while touring, the band took a year off to write and record a new album.

=== Pins and Needles and Imaginary Monsters (2010–2012) ===
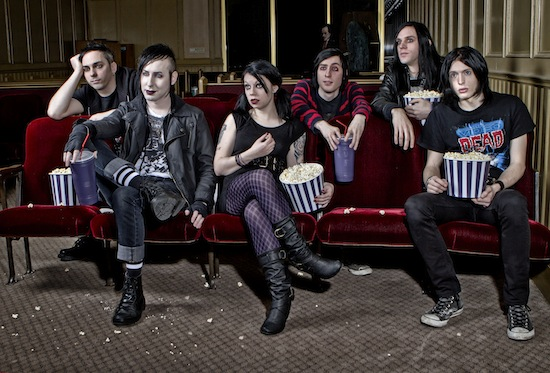
TBM in March 2011. From left: Rhim, Michael Rainbow, Chibi, Owen, Nate Manor, Michael Falcore.

In early July, the band shot a video for "In the Dark", which was directed by Michael Falcore and Rodrigo Gudiño, founder and publisher of Rue Morgue Magazine. It premiered on August 28, 2010, as part of Rue Morgue's Festival of Fear and was released to the general public on YouTube on September 7, 2010. The video pays homage to A Nightmare on Elm Street and Legend among other horror and fantasy films.

On September 14, 2010, the Birthday Massacre released the album, Pins and Needles which was recorded in Toronto and in a basement studio in Dundas, Ontario, hometown of Rainbow and Michael Falcore. The album marked the first time the band released all new material on an album and was produced differently from previous albums by using the same guitar and drums tones on each track. Album artwork was created by Vincent Marcone, as well as artwork contributions from Natalie Shau, and Aslan. The album artwork also differed in that it broke from the traditional silhouette art found on other releases.

The band toured America opening up for Otep in July and August then in October toured the UK with fellow Canadian act Raggedy Angry. In November, they continued touring America on a co-headlining run with Black Veil Brides, along with Dommin and Aural Vampire as supporting acts. The band also made a lineup change by adding Nate Manor, formally of Wednesday 13, to replace O.E on bass. The tour's setlist featured five to six tracks off of Pins and Needles, with "Always" and "Midnight" rotating during different shows. 2010 also saw the launch of the band's new website TheBirthdayMassacre.com created by Owen and the group.

In early 2011, the band played the Opera House as part of JUNOFEST with fellow Toronto band Die Mannequin and Montreal band Ariel. On May 21, 2011, The Birthday Massacre announced that Imaginary Monsters would be released on August 9, 2011, through Metropolis Records. Later in the summer it was announced that the band would be the support act for an upcoming North American tour by Japanese metal band Dir En Grey beginning in December. On August 4, 2011, the band released the Imaginary Monsters EP to listen to in full on their Myspace profile. Imaginary Monsters includes remixes of tracks from their 2010 album Pins and Needles, the remixes made by Combichrist, SKOLD, Kevvy Mental & Dave Ogilvie, Tweaker, and Assemblage 23. The EP also features the video for In The Dark. On November 29, 2011, the band embarked on a small headlining tour across Southeastern United States and on December 4, 2011, joined as the supporting act for Dir En Grey.

=== Hide and Seek and Superstition (2012–2014) ===
Hide and Seek was recorded between January and July in 2012 and was released on October 9, 2012. The band was on tour supporting the new album through early December 2012 with William Control, Aesthetic Perfection, and Creature Feature.

An instrumental track titled "Night Shift" was made available as a free download at Rue Morgue. According to Falcore, the track is a homage to John Carpenter movie soundtracks and will be used as the band's intro music during their 2012 North American tour. On October 16, 2012, Hide and Seek was released and was received warmly by fans and critics, debuting at number 138 in the Billboard 200 charts.

In 2013, the band performed two shows in Russia (in Moscow and Saint Petersburg) and one at Wave-Gotik-Treffen festival. The band performed a brief tour Fall 2013, co-headlining with Emilie Autumn. In mid 2013, the band officially announced that they were working on a new album. On February 5, 2014, the band announced that their next album would partly be funded by a crowdfunding project on PledgeMusic in cooperation with their label, Metropolis Records. The project launched on February 7, 2014, offering pledgers a number of incentives and bundles in return for their support. In under 24 hours, the band was able to meet their goal. The project was the first time that fans were able to relay their thoughts and opinions with the band in regards to the album as the album's production progresses.

On June 29, 2014, via PledgeMusic, the band's manager Terry McManus announced the album would be released November 11, 2014, with a supporting North American tour in Fall 2014, a Brazil tour in January 2015, and a UK tour beginning February 2015. On July 30, 2014, it was revealed by the band's manager via the band's Facebook that the new album is called Superstition. The album was released on the pledged date of November 11.

=== Imagica, Under Your Spell and Diamonds (2016–2022) ===
On April 22, 2016, the band announced they would be releasing a collection of remastered tracks from the original Imagica four-track demos. The album, titled Imagica, was released on July 22, 2016. On June 4, 2016, they opened up another PledgeMusic for an album, subsequently named Under Your Spell, that will be released "near the beginning of June" 2017. The goal was reached the same day.

On April 5, 2019, they announced on Facebook that their next album would be released in March 2020, and that they would use crowdfunding again in some capacity. On January 1, 2020, the band announced on Facebook that the album is titled Diamonds. It was released on March 27, 2020, and consists of nine tracks. On January 23, 2020, the band released the first single from Diamonds titled "The Sky Will Turn".

=== Fascination and Pathways (2022–present) ===
The new album, Pathways, released on April 11, 2025.

== Internet presence ==
The Birthday Massacre Bunny Logo, which first appeared on the band's Nothingandnowhere.com website

The Birthday Massacre have utilized the Internet throughout their career and are an example of a musical group that has evolved alongside file sharing, and advancements in audio streaming capabilities. Initially, the band distributed their music for free, using music sharing software Napster, in addition to sharing their music on MP3.com and their official websites. The band was active in updating their websites regularly, interacting with fans on their forum, and offering their site in multiple languages like French, German and Japanese. Early on, the band encouraged fans to create their own content, and consequently the band saw a surge in fan-created content, which they organized on a webring called Violetprison.com, posting in 2003; "We want our fans to contribute and be involved so rather than telling newcomers who we are, we would rather our fans tell you."

In 2006, a Chicago-based Birthday Massacre street team put out a concert film from their US tour. It was shot in secret as a present to congratulate the band for completing a full tour of the United States. After a trailer for the film sparked Internet interest, the band's management agreed to allow the entire film's release. Called The Birthday Massacre Bootleg, it was re-released in high definition with 5.1 surround in January 2015. The band returned thanks to the producers in the liner notes of Walking with Strangers.

When asked about how the band uses the Internet, Rainbow said in a 2009 interview: "It's also a way to, you know, not just present the music, but make an environment, a visual environment around the music, which was something we were really interested in." When asked about File sharing, Chibi said in a 2010 interview: "It's like the best friend of a band when you're starting up... But then, it's like the worst enemy... The Internet can take you so far." Falcore says in a 2010 interview: "Once it's released people start downloading for free and not paying for it, you know, it hurts the artist." The band has remained popular for over a decade despite receiving very little mainstream press or radio play, referring to themselves as the "black sheep" of the Canadian music scene.

== Musical style ==
The Birthday Massacre has been described as a "darkwave ensemble that combines electronica, goth, and new wave". The band has also been described as "everything from new wave to electronic rock to nu metal".

=== Lyrics ===
When asked in a video interview by TasteitTV about having to conform to society, Rainbow said: "...A lot of the inspirations and themes in the lyrics, and even in the imagery is sort of childhood, and you know that perspective of when you're younger... you lose a bit of that sense of wonder and mystery, which is really inspiring and gives you a lot of energy when you're younger."

On the Blairing Out With Eric Blair show, when asked about what kind of advice Chibi would give to somebody who was thinking about committing suicide, Chibi responds: "Just ride it out because things can get better. When I think back to times in my life when I was having a horrible time, like I hated high school, I was unpopular, the whole thing. It became so irrelevant. It's like if you just give things time, you'll be like, what was I worried about five years ago? Nothing's that relevant."

== Views ==
In an interview by PETA, Chibi said:

Our manager is really on the politicians about factory farming in Southwestern Ontario. Besides the cruelty to the animals, the runoff of the manure in the spring with the heavy rains is making the coastline of Lake Huron a disaster zone. He tells me that the beautiful stretch of sand dunes and beaches around Pinery Provincial Park and well north of Grand Bend (the big resort town), gets posted for no swimming half the summer. It should probably be posted all the time until they dismantle the factory farms in Huron County.

In March 2013, the band announced their support for same-sex marriage and LGBT rights.

== Members ==
=== Current members ===
- Sara "Chibi" Taylor – lead vocals (1999–present)
- Michael Rainbow – rhythm guitar, programming, backing vocals (1999–present)
- Michael Falcore – lead guitar, programming (1999–present)
- Owen Mackinder – keyboards, keytar (2005–present)
- Philip Elliott – drums (2018–present)
- Brett "Bat" Carruthers – bass, backing vocals (2019–present), keyboards (2004)

=== Former members ===
- Matthew "O.E." O'Halloran – bass, backing vocals (2007–2010), drums (1999–2003)
- Aslan – bass (1999–2007)
- Adm – keyboards (2002–2004)
- Dank – keyboards (1999–2001)
- James "Rhim" Davis – drums (2003–2018)
- Nate Manor – bass (2010–2019)

=== Touring members ===
- J. Pilley – drums (2000)
- Joe Letz – drums (2017)
- Nik Pesut – drums (2017)

== Discography ==
- Nothing and Nowhere (2002)
- Violet (2005)
- Walking with Strangers (2007)
- Pins and Needles (2010)
- Hide and Seek (2012)
- Superstition (2014)
- Under Your Spell (2017)
- Diamonds (2020)
- Fascination (2022)
- Pathways (2025)

== See also ==
- List of alternative rock artists
- List of gothic rock bands
- List of post-punk revival bands
- Culture in Toronto
- Music of Ontario
