= A Stimulus for Reason =

Studio album by Alpha Galates
- Released: Mar 25, 2008
- Genre: Progressive Metal
- Label: EMI Music Distribution

A Stimulus for Reason is the first full-length album released by Alpha Galates. It was released on EMI records in 2008. It was produced by Matthew von Wagner, mixed by Joe Barresi, and Mastered by Bob Ludwig.

== Track listing ==
1. "Conformity" – 1:28
2. "2 Months In" – 7:57
3. "Standing" – 3:47
4. "Natio" – 5:08
5. "Obitus" – 4:34
6. "The Darkest Eyes" – 3:50
7. "Passion" – 5:18
8. "Stop Programming" – 1:08
9. "Love Despair" – 11:25
10. "Time Out" – 3:34
11. "Subliminal" – 9:00
12. "Entropy and Chaos" – 10:44
