= Hide and Seek (The Birthday Massacre album) =

Studio album by The Birthday Massacre
- Released: October 9, 2012
- Recorded: January–July 2012
- Genre: Electronic rock; dark wave
- Length: 35:39
- Label: Metropolis
- Producer: Rainbow and Michael Falcore

The Birthday Massacre chronology
Imaginary Monsters (2011)	Hide and Seek (2012)	Superstition (2014)

Singles from Hide and Seek
- 1. "Down" Released: September 5, 2012; 2. "One Promise" Released: March 19, 2013

Professional ratings
Review scores
Source	Rating
Auxiliary Magazine	9/10 stars
Blogcritics	favorable
Bloody Disgusting	favorable
COMA Music Magazine	mixed
EGL Magazine	favorable
Examiner.com	5/5 stars
Fearnet	favorable
IGN	favorable
Popblerd!!	A
Terrorizer	unfavorable
ReGen Magazine	3/5 stars
UR Chicago	4.5/5 stars

Hide and Seek is the fifth studio album by Canadian electronic rock band The Birthday Massacre.

== Background and production ==
In a press release statement, the album was described by the band as being "darker" lyrically than previous records, a quality that was attributed to a sense of tension and a rushed urgency that was felt during the writing and recording process. During the recording process it was learned that lead vocalist Chibi had developed polyps, which in effect, altered some of the qualities of her voice during the album's final recording. In an interview with Auxiliary Magazine, the album's theme was described by the band as being loosely based on Chibi's fascination with unsolved murder mysteries, the idea of the city, and death; particularly, the thirty-year-old mystery of a missing girl. The song "Leaving Tonight" in particular is loosely inspired by the unsolved kidnapping/murder of Christine Jessop.

Regarding the writing process, Chibi stated in a December 2012 interview with The Weekender that lyrics were challenging to write.

In the same interview, she explained that recording was also straining for her voice, even after quitting smoking. On the stress of her health conditions and meeting the recording deadlines, Chibi commented: "We were able to achieve some really interesting stuff... There's a lot of anger or frustration that is there and it's so real because I was furious at the situation."

== Release and promotion ==
On September 5, 2012, the song "Down" was released on the bands YouTube page. It was later made available for free download through rcrdlbl.com on October 3, 2012. The same day, an instrumental track called "Night Shift" was released through Rue Morgue for the band's later supporting tour, to open as their live set intro song.

On October 5, 2012, the entire album was made available for free online streaming exclusively on RevolverMag.com via Metropolis Records SoundCloud account.

On October 9, 2012, the album was released worldwide through Metropolis Records in CD, digital download, and limited edition vinyl formats.

In Fall 2012 the band embarked on their North America tour with William Control, Aesthetic Perfection, and Creature Feature as supporting acts. On November 29, 2012, Chibi injured her knee on stage, causing the show to end abruptly and the following show to be canceled. The remaining tour dates were played as scheduled with a knee brace.

== Video Contest ==
On January 2, 2013, the band announced on their Facebook page a music video contest open to all fans worldwide. The band required all entries be songs from Hide and Seek. Entries began on January 9 with a deadline by March 9th that same year. 1st place prize to the winner, if living outside of North America would was promised a cash prize equal to $5000.00. If the winner lived in North America then they'd be given the option of a slightly smaller cash prize ($4000.00) and an all expenses paid trip for them and a friend to Toronto to have dinner with the band. In addition, all entries were uploaded to their official YouTube channel.

Over 150 entries were submitted.

On April 10, the winners were announced. The 1st place winner was Michelle Hung Tsz Ching for her video of "One Promise," depicting a girl playing dead with her imaginary twin sister.

== Reception ==
The album has received mostly positive reviews from fans and professional critics. Bloody Disgusting's Jonathan Barkan called the album "another winner", stating, "Even though Hide and Seek is criminally short, it’s a catchy, addictive album that I found myself spinning over and over again without caring that I’d already heard the tracks before". D. Gabrielle Jensen of Blogcritics characterized the album as "consistently good from beginning to end, making [choosing favorite songs] a nearly impossible task"; echoing previous reviews, she commented that the album could have benefited from having 2 or 3 more tracks, and that the album felt like it ended too soon. Comparing the record to their previous albums, Gregory Burkart of Fearnet commented "...you may find yourself pulled to a darker place by the more pensive lyrics and shadowy mood, delivered with less of a wink and a smile than you might be expecting from their previous work". COMA Magazine and ReGen Magazine both gave the album mixed reviews, praising Chibi's "mature" sounding vocals, theme and production, but noted the album still follows a "familiar formula". In a more critical review, Miranda Yardley of Terrorizer described the album as "forgettable", criticizing the album for being pop-like but without any of the catchy hooks that makes pop music redeemable.

== Track listing ==
All tracks are written by Chibi, Rainbow and M. Falcore, except where noted.

No.	Title	Length
1.	"Leaving Tonight"	3:29
2.	"Down"	3:47
3.	"Play with Fire" (co-written with Aaron Cunningham of SINS)	3:47
4.	"Need"	3:31
5.	"Calling"	3:31
6.	"Alibis"	3:28
7.	"One Promise"	3:56
8.	"In This Moment"	4:33
9.	"Cover My Eyes"	3:21
10.	"The Long Way Home"	2:16
Total length:		35:39

Notes

- "Calling" features elements from "God Given" by Nine Inch Nails.
- "Play with Fire" was credited as "Written by 'Wight Eyes' – (Rainbow and Aaron Cunningham)" The song is notably the first time anyone from outside the band itself (at the time) has ever contributed lyrics to a song.

== Personnel ==
The Birthday Massacre

- Chibi – vocals
- Rainbow – rhythm guitar
- Falcore – lead guitar
- Rhim – drums
- Owen – keyboards
- Nate Manor – bass

Production

- Dave Ogilvie – mixing
- Kevin James Maher – programming

== Charts ==
Chart	Peak position
US Billboard 200	138
US Dance/Electronic Albums	7
US Top Heatseekers	3
US Independent Albums	36
