= Walking with Strangers =

Studio album by The Birthday Massacre
- Released: September 10, 2007
- Recorded: Toronto, Ontario, Canada; (Dire Studios, Orange Lounge)
- Studios: Dire Studios, Orange Lounge
- Genres: Synthpop; gothic rock; new wave
- Length: 49:40
- Label: Metropolis
- Producers: Michael Rainbow, Mike Falcore, Dave "Rave" Ogilvie

The Birthday Massacre chronology
Blue (2005)	Walking with Strangers (2007)	Looking Glass (2008)

Singles from Walking with Strangers
- 1. "Red Stars" Released: August 21, 2007; 2. "Looking Glass" Released: May 6, 2008

Walking with Strangers is the third studio album by Canadian rock band The Birthday Massacre. The album was released on September 10, 2007, in North America and September 21, 2007, in Europe.

The song "To Die For" is a reworked and re-recorded version of the track of the same name that appeared on the band's first album, Nothing & Nowhere, in 2002. "Remember Me" is also a reworked and re-recorded version of the track of the same name that appeared on the band's limited edition demo 1 Imagica.

Walking with Strangers

No.	Title	Lyrics	Music	Length
1.	"Kill the Lights"	Rainbow, Chibi	Rainbow, M. Falcore	3:55
2.	"Goodnight"	Rainbow	Rainbow, M. Falcore	4:02
3.	"Falling Down"	Rainbow, Chibi	Rainbow, M. Falcore, O.E.	4:12
4.	"Unfamiliar"	Rainbow, O.E.	Rainbow, M. Falcore, O.E.	3:18
5.	"Red Stars"	Rainbow, Chibi, O.E.	Rainbow, M. Falcore, O.E.	3:41
6.	"Looking Glass"	Rainbow, Chibi, O.E.	Rainbow, M. Falcore, O.E.	4:25
7.	"Science"	Rainbow	Rainbow, M. Falcore	4:04
8.	"Remember Me"	Rainbow, Chibi	Rainbow, M. Falcore	4:07
9.	"To Die For"	Rainbow	Rainbow, M. Falcore	5:05
10.	"Walking with Strangers"	Rainbow, Chibi, O.E.	Rainbow, M. Falcore, O.E.	3:55
11.	"Weekend"	Rainbow, Chibi	Rainbow	3:53
12.	"Movie"	Rainbow	Rainbow, M. Falcore, O.E.	5:03

== Singles ==
The first single, Red Stars, was released as a digital download on iTunes on August 21, 2007. An EP for the song Looking Glass was released on May 6, 2008.

== Credits and personnel ==
The Birthday Massacre

- Chibi - lead vocals
- Rainbow - rhythm guitar, synth/percussion programming, backing vocals
- Mike Falcore - lead guitar, synth/percussion programming
- O.E. - live bass, backing vocals
- O-EN - live keyboards
- Rhim - live drums

== Reviews ==
- Stylus Magazine (B−) link
- AbsolutePunk (93%) link
- Release Magazine (8/10) link

== Charts ==
On the issue date of September 29, 2007, Walking with Strangers debuted at number #10 on the Billboard Top Heatseekers chart. It stayed on the chart for two weeks.

Chart	Peak position
Billboard Top Heatseekers	10
Billboard Independent Albums	32

== Release history ==
Region	Date
Netherlands	September 21, 2007

== Notes ==
- "Weekend" features elements from "Sunday Bloody Sunday" by U2.
- The track "Red Stars" is the album's first single and was released as an iTunes digital download. "Looking Glass", the second single off the album, received a physical release and a music video.
- To promote the CD, the band went on two tours. The first being the "Walking with Strangers Tour" in 2007. For 2008 the band co-toured with Mindless Self Indulgence on their "If" tour.
- A demo version of "Kill the Lights" was released on January 1, 2007. The band also played this demo version on their Broken Minds Tour in both North America and Europe in 2006.
