= Jakalope =

Canadian indie pop/rock group

- Origin: Canada
- Genres: Pop rock, industrial, electronica
- Years active: 2003–2011
- Labels: Orange Record Label, 604 Records
- Members: Chrystal Leigh; Dave "Rave" Ogilvie; Phil Caivano; Allie Sheldan; Nik Pesut; Kevin James Maher; Matt Warhurst; Sean Stubbs; Anthony Valcic "The Three Dons"
- Past members: Katie B
- Website: http://jakalope.ca/

Jakalope was a Canadian Indie pop/rock group. They formed in 2003 and named for the mythical creature of the jackalope. The band was started by noted Canadian industrial musician and producer Dave "Rave" Ogilvie, most famous for his studio work with such acts as Skinny Puppy, David Bowie, Nine Inch Nails, and Marilyn Manson. The band gained much popularity after playing the opening theme song to seasons 4–7 of the TV series Degrassi: The Next Generation.

== History ==
=== Beginnings and It Dreams ===
Jakalope began in 2003 as an open-concept project headed by Dave Ogilvie. His conceptual aim was towards a new musical genre rooted in industrial rock (for which Ogilvie is famed), but would be able to flow smoothly between searing rock and melodic pop. It was around this time that Ogilvie became acquainted with the vocal stylings of Katie B while she was working at Bryan Adams' The Warehouse Studio in Vancouver. The two of them had instant chemistry, and Katie took her position center stage as the front woman of Jakalope.

Their debut album, It Dreams, was released in 2004, and spawned the hit singles and videos "Pretty Life", and "Feel It". The third single was "Go Away", but the video received little play on MuchMusic and was unsuccessful compared to the two previous singles. In 2005 It Dreams was released in Japan.

For this album, the band collaborated with a large number of guest musicians, including Trent Reznor (who contributed production work, as well as song writing, and instrumentation), Kat Bjelland and members of Acid Polly, Sloan, Monster Magnet, and Malhavoc.

The cover art for It Dreams received the Juno Award for Best CD/DVD Artwork Design of the Year in 2005, and was designed by artist Vincent Marcone.

=== Born 4 ===
In early October 2005, the Orange Record Label confirmed that Jakalope would return to the studio in late October to record their next album, Born 4. The first single off the album, "Upside Down (And I Fall)", was released to radio in March 2006. There was some controversy with the release date constantly changing, from an initial date set for spring 2006. Due to undisclosed reasons the release date was postponed several times, until the release on October 3.

Trent Reznor returned as co-producer and other guests on the second album include Allie Sheldan (Rio Bent), Thom D'arcy (Small Sins), Bob Pantella (Monster Magnet), Alex Lifeson (Rush), Jeremy Fisher, and Bill Rieflin (Ministry, R.E.M., Married To Music). Vincent Marcone returned once more to do the CD design.

Born 4 was released on June 7, 2006, in Japan, and on October 3 in Canada. It was later made available for purchase on iTunes in both the United States and Canada.

=== Katie B's departure and the arrival of Chrystal Leigh ===
In spring 2007, frontwoman Katie B. left the band to pursue a solo career. She summarizes her experience with Jakalope as a time where she "grew as a songwriter, a performer, an artist, and learned many a valuable lesson". The split was said to be amicable and there is no ill will between the two parties.

The spot of lead singer was eventually filled by Chrystal Leigh, former lead singer for now-defunct Vancouver band The Perfect Strangers. She also fronted the Chrystal Leigh Band during a stint in Kelowna, and contributed supporting vocals to the song "Vertebrae" by Closing Iris. Of Chrystal, Ogilvie has said: "I was blown away by her personality, her voice, and the fact that she's a piano player. I was dying to have someone to collaborate with, who actually is a musician and not just a singer."

For the next few years, Jakalope slowly put together new material and searched for a new label. They still played the occasional show, such as playing at the 2009 Juno Festival and released the occasional song via their Myspace.

=== Things That Go Jump in the Night ===
First, the band released two new songs, via their official Myspace, the first titled "Delicious" and the second, a cover of the Julee Cruise song, "Falling". Ogilvie announced that the album would be named Delicious. Another song, titled "Last Song", was released via the official Jakalope fansite. A remix of "Delicious" by Alkatraz was also released to their Myspace.

In August 2009, Jakalope released yet another new song, titled "a.k.a. Cupcake", through their YouTube account and announced that final recording for their second album had begun.

In February 2010, the band announced that they had signed to 604 Records and soon after announced that filming of a video for a single titled "Witness" would be taking place the following week.

In March 2010, the band announced via Twitter that the first single would be released at the end of March and the new album would be out by the end of May.

On May 19, 2010, Jakalope posted three new songs on their MySpace page, "Witness", "Baby Blue", and "Combine", as well as a trailer for the music video for "Witness".

On July 13, 2010, "Witness", the first single from the band's third album, was made available through the iTunes Store. The Kevvy Mental remix of "Witness" by Kevin James Maher was also made available for purchase.

== Members ==
Due to the nature of the band, there are constantly rotating members, however the core members of the band are:

- Chrystal Leigh – lead vocals, keyboard and piano
- Dave "Rave" Ogilvie – keyboard, guitar and vocals

=== Past members ===
- Katie B
- Phil Western
- Sean Stubbs

== Discography ==
=== Albums ===
- It Dreams (2004)
- Born 4 (2006)
- Things That Go Jump in the Night (October 26, 2010)

=== Singles ===
- "Pretty Life" (2004)
- "Feel It" (2005)
- "Go Away" (2005)
- "Upside Down (And I Fall)" (2006)
- "Digging Deep" (2006)
- "Witness" (2010)

== Trivia ==
- They performed the theme for the opening credits of Degrassi: The Next Generation in seasons 4 and 5. In seasons 6 and 7 the vocals were stripped and the instrumental (still performed by Jakalope) was used. That song, along with "Feel It", was featured on the 2005 soundtrack Songs from Degrassi: The Next Generation, and again in 2008 on Music from Degrassi: The Next Generation.
- Their song "Upside Down (And I Fall)" was used as part of the soundtrack to the mountain biking video New World Disorder 8 – Smackdown, part of the New World Disorder (Freeride Mountain Biking Movie Series).
- Jakalope's song "Remote Control" was used in the Instant Star episode "Even Better Than the Real Thing" as Eden's Instant Star song, and their song "Go Away" was featured in the episode "The Jean Jenie".
- Jakalope's Chrystal Leigh contributed vocals to the album that was produced and partially co-written by bandmate Dave Ogilvie for Toronto-based act Raggedy Angry.
- The song "Pretty Life" was featured in the Lost Girl episode "Dead Lucky" while Bo and Kenzi enter an underground gambling den.
