= Fusspils 11 =

Fusspils 11 is the name of a satirical German aggrotech, industrial, and EBM musical project collaboration of Ravenous and Funker Vogt members Gerrit Thomas, Jens Kaestel, Björn Böttcher, Tim Fockenbrock, Kai Schmidt, and Peggy Johanson. Their albums to date have been completely in German.

== Albums ==
- Gib Ihr Einen Namen (1998)
- Elektro-Polizei: Alarm Für Fusspils 11! (2005)
- Halbwegs Verpeilt (2022)

== See also ==
- Funker Vogt
- Fictional
- Ravenous
- Gecko Sector
