= Katie Rox =

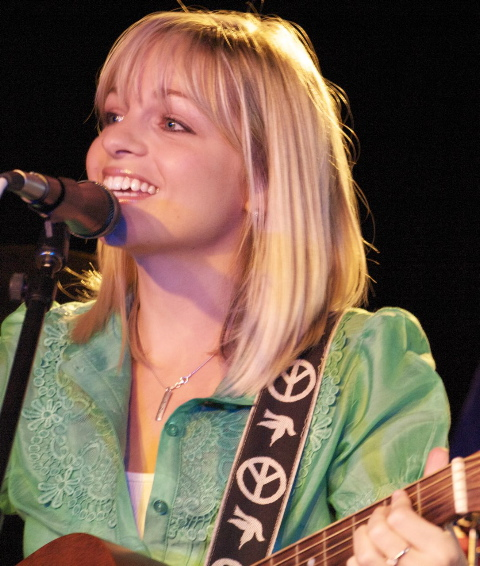

Background information
- Born: Katie Biever
- Origin: Airdrie, Alberta, Canada
- Genres: Indie, country
- Instruments: Vocals, guitar
- Years active: 2004–present
- Website: www.katieroxmusic.com

Katie Rox is a Canadian singer-songwriter from a farm on the outskirts of Airdrie, Alberta, who lives in Vancouver, British Columbia. She performed in the past under the name Katie B.

== Career ==
Katie Rox has previously provided backup vocals for Mandy Moore. She also sings most of the backup vocals on Songs From Instant Star 2, released in April 2006, by Alexz Johnson, and has a cameo in the Jeremy Fisher video for "Cigarette."

=== Jakalope ===
Known at the time as Katie B, Rox was the original lead singer of Jakalope. She was asked to be a part of the band when she met Dave "Rave" Ogilvie at The Warehouse Studio where she was working reception. After singing just one song, Rox was hired on to be the lead vocalist, as well as writing lyrics and melodies on the first two albums.

Rox was also known for singing the opening credits' theme for Degrassi: The Next Generation in seasons 4 and 5.

In early 2007, Rox left Jakalope to pursue her own musical interests. She summarizes her experience with Jakalope as a time when she "grew as a songwriter, a performer, an artist, and learned many a valuable lesson".

=== Katie Rox ===
Shortly after leaving Jakalope, she took on the name Katie Rox and began her solo career. Her album High Standards was released on January 15, 2008, followed by Searchlight in 2009. Her live performance band included members of Beekeeper, Sidney York, and The Matinee.

=== Sébastien & Katie ===
Katie teamed up with Sébastien Lefebvre (of Simple Plan) for a three-song EP collaboration entitled Christmas Etc. The two wrote and recorded the songs with Sébastien in Montreal and Katie in Vancouver. The process was documented on a web series called Write Here, Write There, which can be seen on their YouTube channel.

=== Nice Horse ===
Nice Horse was born when Katie went on a girls' trip to Hawaii with some friends from the Alberta music scene, where they ended up writing dozens of songs. They decided to join together as a band, with the intention of keeping it a side project that they could only unleash at the Calgary Stampede. However, they were touring the country within a year of forming as Tom Cochrane's support act. They decided fairly quickly that they needed to take Nice Horse seriously. They released their first EP, A Little Unstable, with producer Jeff Dalziel (Washboard Union, Brett Kissel), and the legendary Bob Rock (Metallica, Mötley Crüe) on a couple of tracks. The growing buzz surrounding Nice Horse led them to be named a CMT Fresh Face Feature Artist, accompanied by a world premiere of the video for "Pony Up." Nice Horse released their aptly titled full-length debut album, There Goes The Neighbourhood in 2017.

== Discography ==
=== Nice Horse ===
- 2017: There Goes the Neighbourhood
- 2017: A Little Unstable
- 2024: Nice Horse

=== Jakalope ===
- 2004: It Dreams
- 2006: Born 4

=== Solo releases ===
- 2008: High Standards
- 2009: Searchlight
- 2011: Pony Up
- 2014: Paper Airplanes

=== Sébastien & Katie ===
- 2010: "Christmas Etc"
