= Nice Horse =

Canadian country band

- Origin: Alberta, Canada
- Genres: Country
- Years active: 2015–present
- Labels: Coalition Music Records; Sakamoto Music
- Members: Katie Rox; Brandi Sidoryk
- Website: www.nicehorsemusic.com

Nice Horse is a Canadian female country duo consisting of Brandi Sidoryk and Katie Rox. Accolades garnered in their 6 years together include five CCMA nominations, 4 YYC Music Awards, 5 Country Music Alberta Awards and the 2021 Western Canadian Music Award for Country Artist of the Year.

The band has released one studio album entitled "There Goes the Neighbourhood" (2017) and one EP called "A Little Unstable" (2017).

== Career ==
Nice Horse started in Hawaii with what was initially a girls trip to hang out and write songs. In the summer of 2016 they opened for The Kentucky Headhunters in Lloydminster and played Big Valley Jamboree. In the fall of 2016 they signed with Coalition Music Management. In early 2017, they toured with Tom Cochrane on the Mad Mad World 25th anniversary tour. The band provided opening support sets on various dates across western Canada and joined Tom's band for three songs in Edmonton, Toronto, and Oshawa.

The band released their first EP entitled "A Little Unstable", produced by Jeff Dalziel and Bob Rock, on February 24, 2017. On September 8, 2017, Nice Horse released their debut album entitled "There Goes the Neighbourhood", also produced by Jeff Dalziel and Bob Rock, which featured singles "Mansplainin'" and "Pony Up". They have shared the stage with Jess Moskaluke, Gord Bamford, Aaron Goodvin, and Washboard Union. They have played festivals such as The Calgary Stampede, Boots & Hearts, Dauphin Countryfest, Big Valley Jamboree, Rockin' River Music Fest, and the Red Truck Concert Series.

Nice Horse placed second in the 2017 Project Wild competition hosted by Calgary radio station Wild 95.3. Nice Horse teamed up with Can Praxis with Horses 4 Heroes. This foundation uses horses in order to help veterans with posttraumatic stress disorder (PTSD). The band has done concerts in order to raise money and awareness for this foundation. They also released a standalone single entitled "O Holy Night" in 2017 with all proceeds going towards this foundation.

On July 4, 2017, Nice Horse released their debut single "Pony Up" from their debut EP entitled "A Little Unstable". The music video for this song debuted alongside the announcement that they were named CMT Fresh Face Feature Artist The music video for "Mansplainin'" premiered on March 8, 2018, for International Women's Day. The video shows the experiences that the band has with men and shows the band pushing for progress. They also premiered a live version of the song on Facebook Live at Facebook headquarters in Toronto, Ontario. The single "Hot Mess" was released on March 5, 2020. The official music video for Hot Mess premiered on YouTube on May 18, 2020. The video was directed by Lisa Mann and stars Toronto-based drag queen Jezebel Bardot and has a special cameo from RuPaul's Drag Race All Stars winner Trixie Mattel.

The single "Cowgirl" was released on June 19, 2020. The single "High School" was released on January 22, 2021. The single "Good At Missing You" was released on June 4, 2021. In November 2023, they released the single "Things I Wish I Didn't Know".

In July 2024, Nice Horse performed "O Canada" during the 2024 Major League Baseball All-Star Game.

== Band members ==
=== Current members ===
- Katie Rox (Vocals, Banjo, Guitar, Keys)
- Brandi Sidoryk (Vocals, Bass, Keys)

=== Former members ===
- Krista Wodelet (Vocals, Drums, Percussion, Keys)
- Tara McLeod (Guitar)
- Kaley Beisiegel (Vocals, Guitars, Mandolin)

== Awards and recognition ==
- Winner of the 2021 Western Canadian Music Awards for Country Artist of the Year
- Band members Brandi Sidoryk and Krista Wodelet were nominated for Video Director(s) of the Year for the "High School" music video at the 2021 CCMAs
- 3 wins for the 2020 Country Music Alberta Awards (Interactive Artist of the Year, Horizon Single of the Year [Cowgirl], Horizon Group of the Year)
- 6 nominations for the 2020 Country Music Alberta Awards (Horizon Group of the Year, Horizon Single of the Year [Cowgirl], Video of the Year [Hot Mess], Interactive Artist of the Year, Musician of the Year [Brandi Sidoryk], Fan’s Choice)
- Nominated for 4 consecutive Interactive Artist/Group of the Year at the CCMAs (2018, 2019, 2020, 2021)
- Fan's Choice Award nominees and Group/Duo of the Year nominees at the 2017 Alberta Country Music Awards
- Second place in the 2017 Project Wild competition
- Named an Emerging Canadian Artist to Watch For by Canadian Beats magazine
- Nominated for Interactive Artist or Group of the Year at the 2018 CCMA Awards
- Nominated for Country Recording of the Year for the song "Mansplainin'", Group of the Year, Songwriter of the Year for the song "Mansplainin'", as well as Single of the Year for "Mansplainin'" at the 2018 YYC Music Awards in Calgary
- Winner of 2018 YYC Music Award for Country Recording of the Year for the song "Mansplainin'"
- Winner of 2019 Alberta Country Music Awards (ACMAs) for Group of the Year and Video of the Year for "Mansplainin'"
- Nominated for Country Recording of the Year, Group of the Year and Music Video of the Year at the 2019 YYC Music Awards
- Pending nomination for Interactive Artist or Group of the Year at the 2021 CCMA Awards
- 3 wins for the 2022 Country Music Alberta Awards ("High School" Video of the Year, Community Spirit Award, Interactive Artist of the Year
- Winner of Best Country Video for their music video "High School" by the Canadian Independent Music Video Awards
- Winner of Music Video of the Year for "High School" at the 2022 Canadian Country Music Awards

== Discography ==
=== Albums ===
- There Goes the Neighbourhood (2017)
- Nice Horse (2024)

=== EPs ===
- A Little Unstable (2017)

=== Singles ===
Year	Single	Peak chart positions	Album
Year	Single	CAN Country	Album
2017	"Pony Up"	—	There Goes the Neighbourhood
2018	"Mansplainin'"	—	There Goes the Neighbourhood
2020	"Cowgirl"	31	Non-album singles
2021	"High School"	—	Non-album singles
2021	"Good at Missing You"	—	Non-album singles
2023	"Things I Wish I Didn't Know"	44	Nice Horse
"—" denotes releases that did not chart.

==== Christmas singles ====
Year	Single
2018	"O Holy Night"
2020	"Ugly Christmas Sweater"
