= Violet (The Birthday Massacre album) =

Studio album by The Birthday Massacre
- Released: July 20, 2004 (independent); October 25, 2004 (Europe); August 9, 2005 (reissue)
- Studio: Dire Studios, Desolation Studios, Phase One Studios
- Genre: Electronic rock; gothic rock; new wave
- Length: 30:42
- Label: Metropolis
- Producer: The Birthday Massacre

The Birthday Massacre chronology
Nothing and Nowhere (2002)	Violet (2004)	Blue (2005)

Professional ratings
Review scores
Source	Rating
Allmusic	link

Violet is the second studio album by The Birthday Massacre. Originally released July 20, 2004 in Canada, it was later reissued October 25, 2004 in Europe through Repo Records, commercially released on August 9, 2005 through Metropolis Records (North America/UK), and Hellion Records (Brazil). The Metropolis reissue version includes four re-recorded and slightly reworked tracks from their Nothing and Nowhere album: "Happy Birthday", "Horror Show", "Video Kid" and "The Dream". The band's 2005 Blue DVD features a live performance of the title track Violet performed at the album release show in Toronto.

== Track listing ==
Original
No.	Title	Lyrics	Music	Length
1.	"Prologue"		Rainbow, M. Falcore	0:37
2.	"Lovers End"	Rainbow, Chibi	Rainbow, M. Falcore	4:18
3.	"Violet"	Rainbow	Rainbow, M. Falcore	3:37
4.	"Red"		J. Aslan	1:17
5.	"Play Dead"	Rainbow, Chibi	Rainbow, M. Falcore	4:47
6.	"Blue"	Rainbow	Rainbow	4:29
7.	"Black"		J. Aslan	1:34
8.	"Holiday"	Rainbow, Chibi	Rainbow	5:15
9.	"Nevermind"	Rainbow	Rainbow, M. Falcore	4:45

Reissue version
No.	Title	Lyrics	Music	Length
1.	"Prologue"		Rainbow, M. Falcore	0:38
2.	"Lovers End"	Chibi, Rainbow	Rainbow, M. Falcore	4:14
3.	"Happy Birthday"	Rainbow	Rainbow	3:39
4.	"Horror Show"	Rainbow	M. Falcore, Rainbow	4:06
5.	"Violet"	Rainbow	M. Falcore, Rainbow	3:37
6.	"Red"		J. Aslan	1:11
7.	"Play Dead"	Chibi, Rainbow	M. Falcore, Rainbow	4:47
8.	"Blue"	Rainbow	Rainbow	4:30
9.	"Video Kid"	Rainbow	Rainbow	4:34
10.	"The Dream"	Chibi, Rainbow	Rainbow, M. Falcore	3:51
11.	"Black"		J. Aslan	1:29
12.	"Holiday"	Chibi, Rainbow	Rainbow	5:14
13.	"Nevermind"	Rainbow	Rainbow, M. Falcore	4:35
Total length:				44:25

== Personnel ==
Credits adapted from Violet album liner notes.

- Chibi – vocals
- Rainbow – rhythm guitar
- M. Falcore – lead guitar
- Aslan – bass
- Rhim – drums

== Charts ==
Chart performance for Violet
Chart (2026)	Peak position
UK Independent Albums Breakers (OCC)	11

== Release history ==
Region	Date
Canada	July 20, 2004
Germany	October 25, 2004
United Kingdom	September 12, 2005
France	November 28, 2005
Italy	December 12, 2005
Netherlands	March 1, 2007

== Notes ==
- Videos for both "Blue" and "Nevermind" were produced. "Blue" is an elaborate story-based video while "Nevermind" is a straightforward performance video, both of which were released on the "Blue DVD".
- Although the track list on the CD labels the final track as "Nevermind", if burned on iTunes, the track will be titled "Neverland".
- The band recorded a cover of The NeverEnding Story theme for the album, but left it off after not being pleased with the final result. The only existing version of the song is a low quality mp3 that can be found on P2P file sharing systems, or on their original EP under the name Imagica. However, on March 19, 2021, they released a newly recorded version as a single.
- On the 2004 release of Violet, Adm is pictured in the booklet as the keyboardist. On the 2005 re-release, he is removed from the booklet picture because he had left the band by that time.
- The track "Happy Birthday" was featured in the eighth episode of the first season of The Vampire Diaries, "162 Candles.",
