= Army of the Universe =

Italian industrial dance band

- Origin: Milan, Italy
- Genres: Industrial dance
- Years active: 2008–present
- Label: Metropolis
- Member of: Kult of the Skull God
- Members: Albert Vorne; Lord K Dave Tavecchia; Giuseppe Amato
- Website: Official site

Army of the Universe is an Italian industrial dance band, now located in Los Angeles, formed in 2008 by trance and techno producer Albert Vorne (aka Trebla) and vocalist Lord K, lead singer of Kult of the Skull God. The band also includes guitarist Dave Tavecchia and drummer Giuseppe Amato.

== Style ==
The band has been described as similar in style to industrial bands of the 1990s such as Nine Inch Nails and Ministry.

== Touring ==
The band toured with KMFDM in North America in August, 2011 and supported Skinny Puppy on the February leg of their 2014 Live Shapes for Arms tour. They also toured with The Birthday Massacre in their Under Your Spell Tour in 2017

== Band members ==
- Albert Vorne - keyboards, backing vocals, programming
- Lord K - lead vocals
- Dave Tavecchia - guitars, backing vocals
- Giuseppe Amato - drums

== Discography ==
- Lovedead (EP) (2008)
- Mother Ignorance (2011)
- The Hipster Sacrifice (2013)
- The Magic (EP) (2016)
- 1999 & The Aftershow (2016)
