= The Hero Trilogy =

Singles by Funker Vogt

The Hero Trilogy consists of the three singles: Tragic Hero, Fallen Hero, and Arising Hero.

With the release of Blutzoll, Funker Vogt have completed their 'Hero Trilogy'. It began with Tragic Hero on the album Execution Tracks, continued with Fallen Hero from Navigator, and was concluded in 2010 with Arising Hero. All 3 parts of the trilogy were released as promotional singles.

== "Tragic Hero" ==
"Tragic Hero"

Single by Funker Vogt
- Released: 1998
- Recorded: 1998
- Genre: aggrotech
- Length: 41:04
- Label: Metropolis Records
- Producer: Gerrit Thomas

Funker Vogt singles chronology
"Execution Tracks"	"Tragic Hero"	"VAC Vs Funker Vogt"

"Tragic Hero" (1998) is an aggrotech single by Funker Vogt. It is the first part of the Hero Trilogy.

=== Track listing ===
No.	Title	Length
1.	"Tragic Hero" (Haat Klaap mix)	5:18
2.	"Tragic Hero" (Apoptygma Berzerk Remix)	7:30
3.	"Tragic Hero" (Blind Vision Remix)	4:17
4.	"Spread Your Legs!"	4:44
5.	"Tragic Hero" (Covenant Remix)	6:02
6.	"The International Killer" (Less Vox Remix)	5:59
7.	"The Voices of the Dead" (Evils Toy Remix)	3:48
8.	"Spread Your Legs!" (Fuck Mix)	3:30

== "Fallen Hero" ==
"Fallen Hero"

Single by Funker Vogt
- Released: 25 July 2005
- Genre: aggrotech
- Length: 28:05
- Label: Metropolis Records
- Producer: Gerrit Thomas

Funker Vogt singles chronology
"Red Queen"	"Fallen Hero"	"White Trash"

"Fallen Hero" (2005) is an aggrotech single by Funker Vogt. It is the second part of the Hero Trilogy

=== Track listing ===
No.	Title	Length
1.	"Fallen Hero"	5:07
2.	"Fallen Hero" (Jekyll&Hyde-Remix by The Birthday Massacre)	3:49
3.	"Pain"	5:24
4.	"Fallen Hero" (Vereinigt)	4:58
5.	"Fallen Hero" (Underwater Pilots-Remix)	4:58
6.	"Our Battlefield"	3:49

== "Arising Hero" ==
"Arising Hero"

Single by Funker Vogt
- Released: 17 September 2010
- Genre: aggrotech
- Length: 37:00
- Label: Metropolis Records
- Producer: Gerrit Thomas

Funker Vogt singles chronology
"White Trash"	"Arising Hero"

"Arising Hero" (2010) is an aggrotech single by Funker Vogt. It is the third and final part of the Hero Trilogy.

=== Track listing ===
No.	Title	Length
1.	"Arising Hero" (Club Mix)	4:18
2.	"Arising Hero" (Rotersand Rework)	4:54
3.	"Arising Hero" (Redemption)	5:28
4.	"My Innermost" (Noblesse Oblige Remix)	4:50
5.	"Arising Hero" (Faderhead Remix)	4:15
6.	"Arising Hero" (Revolution)	4:41
7.	"Arising Hero" (Factory Mix by Komor Kommando)	4:58
8.	"My Innermost" (Loop Mix)	3:42
