= Raggedy Angry =

Canadian rock band

- Origin: Toronto, Ontario, Canada
- Genres: Industrial rock Electronic rock
- Years active: 2006–present
- Labels: Synthetic Sounds; Danse Macabre (Europe)
- Members: Irvin Scabtree; Paul Roussel; Brendan Bell
- Website: http://www.raggedyangry.com

Based in Toronto, Ontario, Canada, Raggedy Angry is a band that plays a mixture of synth and industrial rock music.

On January 1, 2008, the band self-released their second studio album Pestilence. The album included vocals from Chrystal Leigh of Jakalope and Nils Rasmussen of Uncle Outrage. Dave "Rave" Ogilvie worked as a producer, engineer, and mixer on this album.

On October 1, 2010, via Synthetic Sounds and Danse Macabre the band released their third full-length album entitled How I Learned To Love Our Robot Overlords. The album featured production work from Dave "Rave" Ogilvie along with vocals from Jakalope lead singer Chrystal Leigh and Kevin James Maher of Fake Shark - Real Zombie!.

On November 27, 2012, via Metropolis Records the band released their fourth full-length album Dead Beats after taking a break in 2011.

The band has played across Europe with The Birthday Massacre in addition to cross Canada with Die Mannequin.

== Current members ==
- Irvin Scabtree - Vocals
- Paul Roussel - Drums
- Brendan Bell - Guitars

== Past members ==
- Pressit - Guitars
- Professor Oblivion - Bass
- Air-Conditioned Superstar - Bass
- C-Man - Bass

== Discography ==
- Take Me, Break Me, Make Me Pretty (2007)
- Pestilence (2008)
- How I Learned To Love Our Robot Overlords (2010)
- Dead Beats (2012)
- Music appearance in Darknet (2013)
