= Diamonds (The Birthday Massacre album) =

Studio album by The Birthday Massacre
- Released: March 27, 2020
- Recorded: Desolation Studios, Dire Studios, The Altar Studios (Toronto, Ontario)
- Genre: Electronic rock
- Length: 37:33
- Label: Metropolis
- Producers: Michael Rainbow, Michael Falcore

The Birthday Massacre chronology
Under Your Spell (2017)	Diamonds (2020)	Fascination (2022)

Singles from Diamonds
- 1. "The Sky Will Turn" Released: January 24, 2020; 2. "The Last Goodbye" Released: March 5, 2020

Diamonds is the eighth studio album by the Canadian rock band The Birthday Massacre, released on March 27, 2020.

== Background and production ==
Diamonds had originally been planned for release in September 2019. In May 2019 the band revealed that the band's vocalist Chibi would be undergoing surgery (condition not stated) but assured it was nothing life-threatening. However, due to the circumstances, the album's release was pushed back.

When asked for comments on the album, guitarist Michael Rainbow told Billboard: “There is a little bit of escapism. It’s the same as escaping into a good movie or a book. Part of what we find fun about writing is being more dreamlike and surreal in our approach."

== Release and promotion ==
On January 24, 2020, a lyric video for "The Sky Will Turn" was released on Metropolis Record's official YouTube channel.

On March 5, 2020, "The Last Goodbye" was released on the band's YouTube channel.

On March 24, 2020, in response to the COVID-19 pandemic and lockdowns occurring worldwide, the band released the entire album early on YouTube for streaming via the Metropolis Record's channel, stating "with love, from The Birthday Massacre."

Initially, the band had planned to go on tour during the spring of 2020 to promote the album. However, the tour was postponed to the fall due to complications surrounding the COVID-19 pandemic. In July 2020, instead of postponing the tour once more, all tour dates were officially canceled.

In October 2020, the band launched their Patreon page where fans could pledge a monthly fee for access to exclusive Q&As with the band, see the making-of their music, livestreams, and previously unreleased material.

== Reception ==
Professional ratings
Review scores
Source	Rating
Cryptic Rock	5/5 stars
MetalTalk	favorable
New Noise Magazine	5/5 stars
Spill Magazine	3.5/5 stars
Sputnikmusic	3.7/5 stars

Diamonds was met with mostly positive reviews.

Caleb R. Newton from New Noise Magazine gave the album a five-star rating calling it "a strikingly personable, sonic journey off into a wistful expanse." Jeannie Blue from Cryptic Rock also gave the album a perfect score, defining the album as another example of the band's "exceptional ability to craft beautifully surreal and hauntingly lush, thoughtfully poetic tracks that provide a multi-layered visual and auditory experience." Robert Adams, who had never heard of The Birthday Massacre prior to his review for MetalTalk, gave the album a favorable review, stating "there's not a single bad track on the album," and was surprised he had never listened to the catalog until then.

Although Sputnikmusic summarized the album as "another excellent outing from a band that perfected their sound long ago," they said there was nothing on it that would come as surprising to fans.

== Track listing ==
All tracks are written by Chibi, Rainbow and M. Falcore.

No.	Title	Length
1.	"Enter"	3:35
2.	"The Sky Will Turn"	4:14
3.	"Diamonds"	3:49
4.	"Run"	3:23
5.	"Flashback"	3:26
6.	"The Last Goodbye"	4:16
7.	"Crush"	5:17
8.	"Mirrors"	4:14
9.	"Parallel World"	5:16
Total length:		37:33

== Personnel ==
Diamonds album personnel adapted from CD liner notes.

- Chibi – songwriter, vocals
- Michael Rainbow – songwriting, vocals, recording, production, mixing
- Michael Falcore – songwriting, vocals, recording, production, mixing
- Brett Carruthers – recording engineering assistance
- Dave Ogilvie – mix engineer, mixing at Hipposonic Studios, Vancouver, Canada
- Liam Moes – assistant mix engineer
- HBomb Mastering – mastering, Toronto, Canada
- Sara Deck – album artwork
- Amir Derakh from Julien-K – guitar solo in "Flashback".
- Recorded At: Desolation Studios (Toronto), Dire Studios (Toronto), and The Altar Studios (Toronto, Canada)
