= Superstition (The Birthday Massacre album) =

Studio album by The Birthday Massacre
- Released: November 11, 2014
- Recorded: Dire Studios, Toronto, Ontario, Canada; The Altar Studios, Toronto, Ontario, Canada
- Genre: Electronic rock; dark wave
- Length: 39:08
- Label: Metropolis
- Producer: Michael Rainbow, Michael Falcore

The Birthday Massacre chronology
Hide and Seek (2012)	Superstition (2014)	Imagica (2016)

Singles from Superstition
- 1. "Beyond" Released: November 19, 2014; 2. "Superstition" Released: September 24, 2015

Superstition is the sixth studio album by Canadian electronic rock band The Birthday Massacre, released on November 11, 2014 through Metropolis Records. The album was funded through PledgeMusic. To promote the album, a subsequent North America tour and music video for "Beyond" followed the album's release.

== Background ==
In 2015, Chibi admitted that the band had initially been hesitant to produce an album through crowd funding, but were glad they made the choice. In Fireworks Magazine Online, she said: "We really wanted it to be worthwhile for the fans... It was incredible to reach our goal so quickly; the campaign definitely brought to us an awareness of how supportive our fans can be. We’re so grateful for everything they’ve done for us."

Regarding the album's themes and lyrics, Chibi has said "I was in a darker place and sort of looking for spiritual comfort, which naturally just brings up confusion and even more questions, so there are more of those lyrical themes on this record. I suffered a few losses in the last year which sent me looking for comfort; a sort of “what is beyond all of this” kind of thing. We started looking at legends, religions, ideas, what other cultures look to, what images and ideas from those explorations appealed to us and working those themes in. Ultimately, spiritual and religious beliefs are basically just “superstitions”, and thus, that became the theme of the album."

During interviews, the band stated that the themes of the album came from their recurring element of water, mythology and world cultures' different views on religion, mortality, loss, and the unknown nature of the afterlife.

== Release and promotion ==
In mid 2013, the band officially announced that they were working on a new album. On February 5, 2014, the band announced that their next album would partly be funded by a crowdfunding project on PledgeMusic in cooperation with their label, Metropolis Records. The project launched on February 7, 2014, offering pledgers a number of incentives and bundles in return for their support. In under 24 hours, the band was able to meet their goal. On June 29, 2014, via PledgeMusic, the band's manager Terry McManus announced the album is set to be released November 11, 2014, with a supporting North American tour in Fall 2014 a Brazilian tour in January 2015 and a UK tour beginning February 2015. On July 30, 2014, it was revealed by the band's manager via the band's Facebook that the album name would be Superstition. The track Beyond was the album's lead single, with an accompanying music video as well. At the campaign's end, the band achieved 312% of its goal. Superstition was released November 11, 2014.

Almost a year after the album's release, the band uploaded a performance music video for the title track, "Superstition", on September 24, 2015. The video was filmed in their rehearsal space.

On November 9, 2014, the band began their North America tour with New Years Day and The Red Paintings.

== Reception ==
Superstition received mostly positive reviews.

Sputnikmusic summarized the album as: "A little less darkness, a little more synth pop", and stated that "The Birthday Massacre is a massively underrated band, and it's an absolute joy watching them further developing their sound with each passing album." Kathy Nichols of The Spill Magazine called the album "enjoyable in its entirety" but found Chibi's growls on tracks such as "Divide" and "Destroyer" to be creepy and "the weakest link" on the album. Ilker Yücel from ReGen Magazine noted the use of ambience in "Surrender" and "The Other Side", and said "Unlike the previous album’s sense of urgency and speed, Superstition allows each song to breathe." Their final comment called Superstition one of their "most powerfully engaging and darkly melodic albums to date." Rafi Shlosman from Cryptic Rock described the programming and synth on the album able to "induce the same fear and euphoria one experiences having a nightmare or dream" and called Superstition "one of 2014’s best albums."

Some reviews criticized particular tracks for having repetitive lyrics and melodies, despite enjoyable instrumentals.

Professional ratings
Review scores
Source	Rating
Sputnikmusic	4/5 stars
The Spill Magazine	4/5 stars
ReGen Magazine	4/5 stars
New Transcendence	4/5 stars
Cryptic Rock	4.5/5 stars

== Track listing ==
All tracks are written by Chibi, Rainbow and M. Falcore, except where noted.

No.	Title	Length
1.	"Divide"	4:04
2.	"Diaries"	3:32
3.	"Superstition" (co-written with Aaron Cunningham of SINS)	3:51
4.	"Destroyer"	3:42
5.	"Surrender"	5:17
6.	"Oceania"	4:11
7.	"Rain"	3:46
8.	"Beyond"	3:51
9.	"The Other Side"	4:30
10.	"Trinity"	2:24
Total length:		39:08

Notes

- "Superstition" was credited as "Written by 'Wight Eyes' - (Rainbow and Aaron Cunningham)".

== Personnel ==
Superstition album personnel adapted from CD liner notes.

- Chibi - songwriter, performance
- Michael Rainbow - songwriting, performance, production, mixing, album cover design
- Michael Falcore - songwriting, performance, production, mixing
- Aaron Cunningham - songwriter on "Superstition", album design and artwork
- Nathaniel Radmacher - additional bass
- Nik Pesut - additional percussion
- Dave Ogilvie - mix engineer, mixing at Hipposonic Studios, Vancouver, British Columbia, Canada
- Karl Dicaire - assistant mix engineer
- Noah Mintz - mastering at Lacquer Channel, Toronto, Ontario, Canada
- Terry McManus - management
- Owen MacKinder - album cover design
- Andrew Rainbow - album cover photography

== Charts ==
Chart	Peak position
US Billboard 200	143
US Top Heatseakers	2
US Top Independent Albums	14
US Top Alternative Albums	10
US Top Rock Albums	23
