= Imaginary Monsters =

EP by The Birthday Massacre
- Released: August 9, 2011
- Recorded: 2011
- Genre: Electronic rock
- Length: 34:14
- Label: Metropolis Records
- Producer: Dave Ogilvie

The Birthday Massacre chronology
Pins and Needles (2010)	Imaginary Monsters (2011)	Hide and Seek (2012)

Professional ratings
Review scores
Source	Rating
AllMusic	3/5 stars
FEARnet	(Favorable)
COMA Music Magazine	(Favorable)

"Imaginary Monsters" is an EP by the Canadian rock band The Birthday Massacre, and contains three new tracks, and five remixes. It was released August 9, 2011. The whole album was made available for streaming direct from the band's Myspace on August 4, 2011. Album artwork by Owen Mackinder, the band's keyboardist.

== Track listing ==
No.	Title	Length
1.	"Forever"	3:56
2.	"Burn Away"	3:43
3.	"Left Behind"	2:36
4.	"Pale" (Kevvy Mental & Dave Ogilvie 'Rubber Unicorn' Mix)	4:09
5.	"Control" (Tweaker Mix)	3:32
6.	"Shallow Grave" (Combichrist 'Good For Her' Mix)	4:33
7.	"Pins and Needles" (SKOLD Mix)	5:01
8.	"Shallow Grave" (Assemblage 23 Mix)	4:24
9.	"In the Dark" (Music Video iTunes Bonus Track])	3:40

== Conception ==
Rainbow of The Birthday Massacre said that the album's sound is a reflection of the bands creative taste, and is about doing fun and colorful things in an aggressive and scary way. The first three tracks on the album are tracks that were not completed in time to make it onto the Pins and Needles record. Imaginary Monsters also includes remixes of tracks from their 2010 album Pins and Needles by Combichrist, SKOLD, Kevvy Mental & Dave Ogilvie, Tweaker, and Assemblage 23. About the title of the EP, Rainbow stated: "The title was partially inspired by some of the doubts and fears we’ve had to face and overcome throughout the past year".
