= Looking Glass (EP) =

EP by The Birthday Massacre
- Released: May 6, 2008
- Recorded: 2008
- Genre: Electronic rock
- Length: 32:27
- Label: Metropolis Records
- Producer: Rainbow, M.Falcore

The Birthday Massacre chronology
Walking with Strangers (2007)	Looking Glass (2008)	Show and Tell (2009)

"Looking Glass" is a single/EP by Canadian electronic rock band The Birthday Massacre. Unlike their previous single, "Red Stars", the Looking Glass EP is a physical release rather than a digital download available through iTunes.

It is the second single released for their second full-length album Walking With Strangers. This is also the fourth song to have a music video.

As well as including the title track, the EP includes remixes of "Red Stars", "Weekend", and "Falling Down" from the album Walking with Strangers. There are also two new songs: "I Think We're Alone Now", originally recorded by Tommy James and the Shondells but popularized by Tiffany in the late 1980s, and "Shiver". In addition, the EP includes the ambient track "Nowhere" which is a re-recording of "The Night Loop" (which was the background music to the band's website). Lastly the EP contains the music video for "Looking Glass" in QuickTime format.

Professional ratings
Review scores
Source	Rating
AllMusic	2.5/5 stars

== Track listing ==
No.	Title	Length
1.	"Looking Glass" (Single Version)	4:31
2.	"Falling Down" (Crawling Pulse Mix by theSTART)	4:17
3.	"Shiver"	3:03
4.	"Red Stars" (Lukewarm Lover Mix by Il Attire)	3:37
5.	"Nowhere"	2:05
6.	"Red Stars" (Space Lab Mix by Dean Garcia)	6:55
7.	"Weekend" (NYC 77 Mix by Dave Ogilvie / Matthew Moldowan)	4:03
8.	"I Think We're Alone Now" (Tommy James and the Shondells cover)	3:57
9.	"Looking Glass" (QuickTime Video)	4:37

== Personnel ==
- Chibi – lead vocals
- Rainbow – rhythm guitar, backing vocals, synth, percussion programming
- Michael Falcore – lead guitar, synth, percussion programming
- O.E. – bass, backing vocals
- Rhim – drums
- Owen – keyboards

== Chart positions ==
Chart (2008)	Peak position
Top Electronic Albums	24
