= A Primitive Evolution =

Canadian rock band

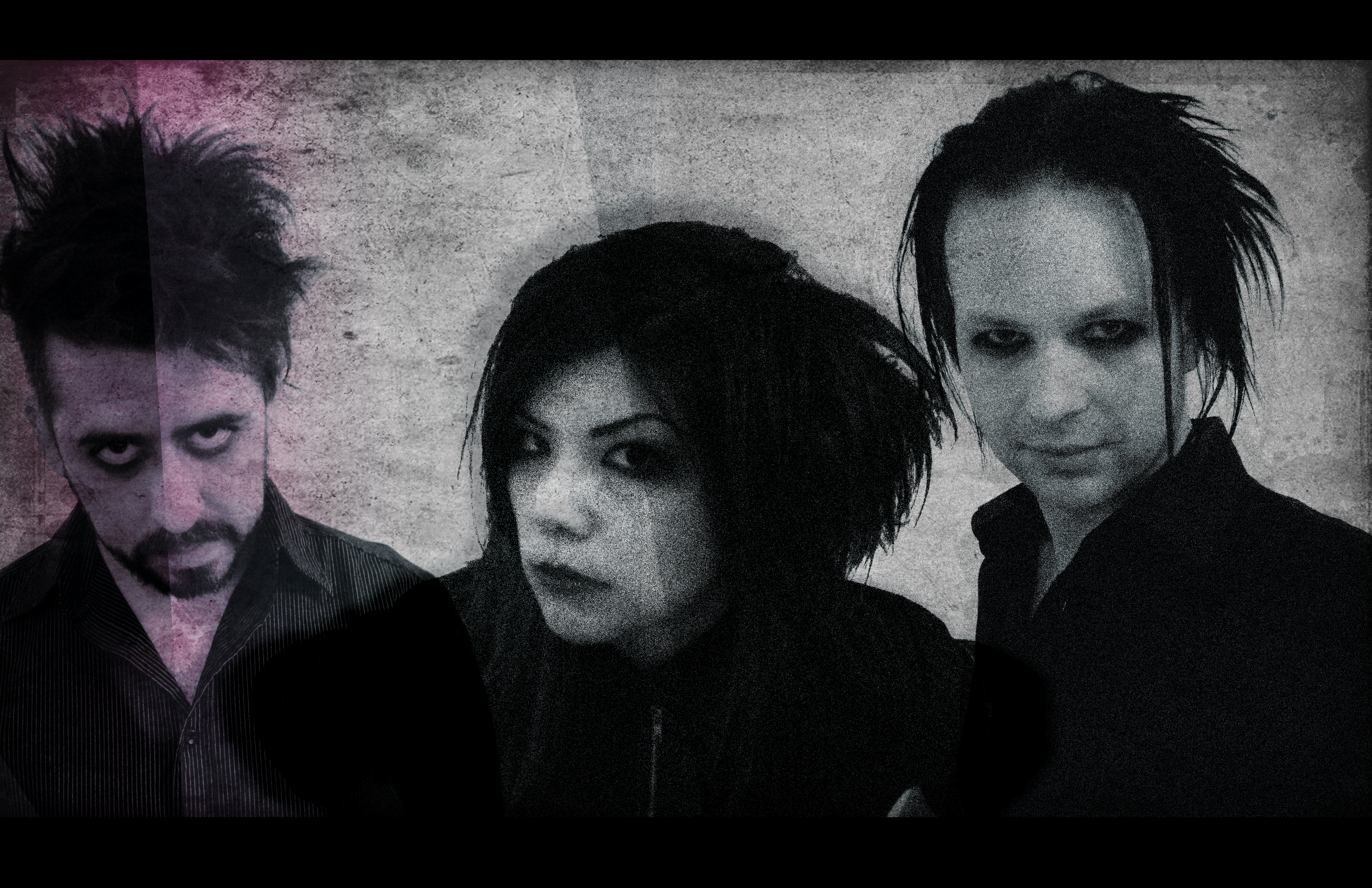

Background information
- Origin: Toronto, Ontario, Canada
- Genres: Alternative rock, Death Rock
- Years active: 2007–present
- Label: None
- Spinoff of: Lye, Aphasia
- Members: Brett Carruthers; Steph Misayo Seki; Stu Dead
- Past members: Scott Carruthers; Dimitri Anastasakis; Rhim
- Website: www.aprimitiveevolution.com

A Primitive Evolution (often identified using the abbreviation A.P.E.) is an alternative rock band based in Toronto, Ontario, Canada.

== History ==
=== Formation ===
Formed in the fall of 2007 out of the band Lye (and before that Aphasia), vocalist Brett Carruthers and bassist Stephany Seki began jamming with drummer Stu Dead, founder of Playdead Cult, a clothing brand and creative lifestyle house located in Toronto. Playdead's involvement in horror culture led to inviting the owner of Darkside horror shop's Dimitri Anastasakis to jam along on guitar. With this line up, they first publicly performed for Toronto's Queen Street Fire fundraiser alongside Billy Talent and The Creepshow.

In 2007, the band self-produced the video for "Death on Wheels" alongside Frankenstein cheerleaders as part of the 2007 L'Oréal Fashion Week, which was voiced by Martin Streek. "Death on Wheels" would initiate, The Death Girls, cheerleaders and super-fans that dance and sing at A.P.E events, sometimes by joining the band on stage. Notable Death Girls include models from the adult website Suicide Girls. A Primitive Evolution would later appear on the adult news channel, Naked News. "Death on Wheels" was also featured on Alan Cross's "Five Songs You Gotta Hear Today".

In 2008, A Primitive Evolution played a Canadian Music Week showcase at The Bovine Sex Club. In 2008, the band continued writing and recording their debut album and worked on another music video for the song "Beyond True". In May, they posted a demo for the song "Empty Holes", which would later also have a corresponding music video. Brett said in a 2010 interview that during these early years the band worked "just writing and figuring each other out".

In the spring of 2009, the group founded the music festival VIVA LOS MUERTOS (2009 line-up featuring The Birthday Massacre, for whom Brett had performed live keyboards for during their fall 2004 tour). The festival included "Major merch sales, dancing Playdead mascots and an eclectic long-weekend crowd that collectively offered plenty for the live eye". The festival had an "overwhelmingly good response", according to the band, hoping to further secure the creation and maintenance of a dynamic "Death Rock" scene in Toronto. Playdead Cult's "Moop", would continue to be the band's mascot and can be seen dancing on stage during the band's live performances.

Later on in 2009, the band's self-produced debut video for "Death on Wheels", voiced by veteran Toronto radio DJ Martin Streek, caught the attention of the production crew for the vampire musical movie Suck. This film debuted at the 2009 Toronto International Film Festival featured the likes of Iggy Pop, Alice Cooper, and Henry Rollins. The film consequently utilized the band's rehearsal space as a set for several scenes in the film. Finally at the end of 2009 the band would release their self-titled debut album.

On February 16, 2010, the band released their debut album digitally for worldwide distribution. In the summer of 2010, Adm Shedden, formerly of The Birthday Massacre and currently of Hunter Eves, joined to perform on live violin for acoustic shows. In 2010, the band continued playing shows in Toronto, Hamilton, Niagara Falls, Kitchener, and Barrie.

On February 15, 2011, the band posted on their Facebook profile that Scott Carruthers (Brett's cousin), would replace Dimitri Anastasakis on guitar. Dimitri had announced in the fall of 2010 also on their Facebook profile that he would be leaving the band due to pursue other goals important to his life. In 2011, the band recorded a new acoustic album, co-produced by John Wozniak, and welcomed back their friend, Adm Shedden for violin. The band encouraged fans to participate in its development by listening to rough mixes. The band documented the recording process with video, MP3's and photo updates on their official website and also announced that 20% of the proceeds would be donated to ShelterBox. In July, the band performed at Trash Fest USA, in Philadelphia, Pennsylvania. A Primitive Evolution was recommended by George Stroumboulopoulos for Canadian Music Week 2011 in his Top 3 Buzz Bands out of the 800 that performed.

In 2018, the band signed a record deal with Metropolis Records to release their album Becoming. Now acting as a three piece with Brett Carruthers, Stephany Seki and Stu Dead, this would be the band's debut release under an official label.

2019 would mark the band's first major North American Tour opening for labelmates PIG. On this tour, they supported their 2018 release Becoming and added new live members to the band, Owen Mackinder from The Birthday Massacre and drummer Jake Hamilton.

== Discography ==
=== A.P.E. (2009) ===
The band's debut album A.P.E., released in early December 2009, was produced by Matthew Von Wagner, (Crystal Castles, Ubiquitous Synergy Seeker, Alpha Galates) and Brett Carruthers. Wagner has worked alongside the likes of Joe Barresi and Bob Ludwig. A.P.E., according to the band, is grounded on a few common themes: the single "Death on Wheels" draws inspiration from classic exploitation horror films, while others like "Dead End" are thinly veiled love songs. "War B." explores political undertones and the Western view of war. Other songs on the album like "Beyond True" explore the romanticism of human interaction. Alan Cross has referenced the band to sound like Radiohead and Nirvana and would go on to call them The Offspring of Grunge in his May 21, 2010, ExploreMusic podcast. (searchable on iTunes)

==== Tracks ====
1. "War B" (4:40)
2. "Beyond True" (4:19)
3. "Death on Wheels" (4:02)
4. "Just Begun" (4:59)
5. "Dead End" (3:59)
6. "Still Waiting" (4:26)
7. "Coming and Going" (3:03)
8. "Show Me" (4:41)
9. "Train Wreck" (4:45)
10. "To Be Lost" (5:17)
11. "Empty Holes" (4:27)

=== The Prize (2012) ===
The band's sophomore album The Prize was released on September 11, 2012. The Prize still includes reworked versions of songs found on APE's debut, but also features three new songs. The album was produced by the band and John Wozniak of Marcy Playground at Mushroom studios in Toronto, ON.

==== Tracks ====
1. "Lord Of Reason" (4:05)
2. "Show Me" (The Prize Version) (3:52)
3. "I Feel It All" (4:52)
4. "Won't Let You Down" (4:10)
5. "Falling Far Behind" (4:28)
6. "Dead End" (The Prize Version) (3:59)
7. "The Prize" (4:26)
8. "Coming and Going" (The Prize Version) (3:05)
9. "Train Wreck" (The Prize Version) (5:36)
10. "We Are Lost" (4:31)

=== Becoming (2018) ===
The band's third album Becoming was released on October 5, 2018. Recorded at their self-built Desolation Studios in Toronto, Becoming features many Canadian collaborations including writer/producer Ian D'Sa from Billy Talent and audio engineer Kenny Luong.

==== Tracks ====
1. "I am an Infinite Cycle" (1:16)
2. "Who's Your Maker" (4:47)
3. "The Beauty" (4:19)
4. "Close Your Eyes" (4:11)
5. "Ghost" (6:17)
6. "Dead Skies" (5:22)
7. "We Are The Truth" (4:38)
8. "Becoming" (3:56)
9. "Skeleton" (4:50)
10. "Picturesque Hell" (4:28)
11. "Better Off Dead" (5:09)
12. "Live Forever" (5:05)
13. "Echo" (5:38)

== Members ==
- Brett Carruthers – guitars, vocals, keyboards (2007–present)
- Steph Misayo Seki – bass, keyboards, cello (2007–present)
- Stu Dead – drums (2007–present)

=== Touring members ===
- Owen Mackinder – keyboards (2019–present)
- Jake Hamilton – drums (2019)

=== Former members ===
- Dimitri Anastasakis – lead guitar (2007–2010)
- Scott Carruthers – lead guitar (2011–2013)
