= Johnny Hollow =

Canadian music group

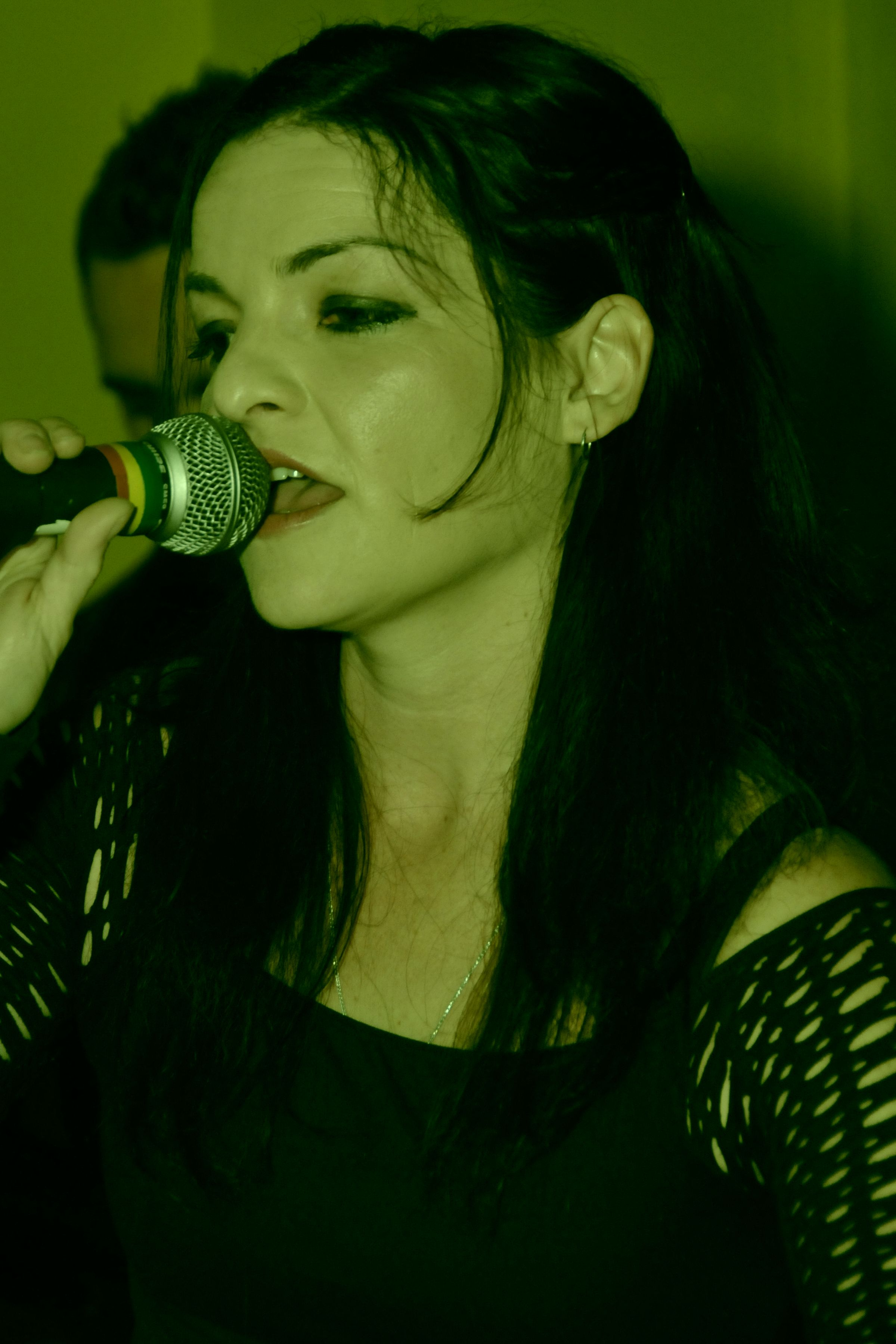

Background information
- Origin: Guelph, Ontario, Canada
- Genres: Dark cabaret; trip hop; dark wave
- Years active: 2001–present
- Label: The Orange Record Label
- Members: Janine White; Vincent Marcone; Kitty Thompson; Steve Hiehn
- Website: johnnyhollow.com

Johnny Hollow is a Canadian music group formed in 2001 in Guelph, Ontario. The band consists of singer Janine White, digital artist Vincent Marcone, cellist Kitty Thompson, and guitarist Steve Hiehn.

Johnny Hollow was founded by Janine White & Vincent Marcone and the group often features Kitty Thompson. Their music combines organic instruments and electro-industrial sounds. Its genre is a form of avant-garde pop closely associated with steampunk and goth genres that features dark art. Their fans have supported several successful crowd-sourcing campaigns.

White is a classically-trained musician and composer who is also a critically acclaimed sound designer. Marcone (and his alter ego, My Pet Skeleton) is a Juno award-winning graphic artist who combines traditional and digital techniques to craft album covers, fairy tales, short films and music videos.

Johnny Hollow has produced 3 full-length albums: Johnny Hollow (2003), Dirty Hands (2008), and A Collection of Creatures (2014), and two EPs: Devil's Night (2010) and Old Gods of New Berlin (2018), along with a number of remixes. Their music has been featured on Lost Girl, On a Sunny Afternoon, and The Facts in the Case of Mister Hollow.

== Founding of the band ==
Marcone, formerly known as "My Pet Skeleton," is a graphic designer. He launched his website and asked White to design the sound effects. Meanwhile, White and Thompson were also experimenting in their recording studio. They had sessions as gig musicians, but decided they were not fulfilling enough. My Pet Skeleton quickly rose to the forefront of the web hall of fame. The trio decided to form an alliance. Their first material was presented on the My Pet Skeleton website.

== Debut ==
In March 2003, Johnny Hollow launched their own small teaser site to announce the release of their first self-produced full-length album. Within one month of the album's release, the band was invited to contribute their first single named "Bag of Snow" to D-Side's sampler disc, to be in the company of artists like Martin Gore of Depeche Mode, Lisa Gerrard of Dead Can Dance, Robin Guthrie of the Cocteau Twins, Type O Negative, The Cramps, and Goldfrapp, who all had a strong influence on the band.

== Discography ==
=== Studio albums ===
- Johnny Hollow (2003)
- Dirty Hands (2008)
- A Collection of Creatures (2014)

=== EPs ===
- Devils Night (2010)
- Old Gods of New Berlin (2018)

=== Compilation albums ===
- Songs That Glow in the Dark (2026)

=== Remixes ===
- Devil's Night Remixes (2014)
- The Mongrel Mixes (2016)
- Her Infinite Jest Alias One Ascendancy Remix (2020)
- My Lovely Jinn - Alias One Let's burn Together Remix (2020)
- Superhero - Dead Red Velvet Remix (2020)
- The Wild Hunt - Isolation Mix (2020)
- The Wild Hunt - The New Berlin Alias One Remix (2020)
- Bogeyman Alias One Remix (2021)
- I, Goblin Jonah K Red Pill Remix (2021)

== Filmography ==
- The Facts in the Case of Mister Hollow (2008, film soundtrack)
