= Under Your Spell (album) =

Studio album by the Birthday Massacre
- Released: June 9, 2017
- Genre: Electronic rock; dark wave
- Length: 41:16
- Label: Metropolis
- Producer: Michael Rainbow, Michael Falcore

The Birthday Massacre chronology
Imagica (2016)	Under Your Spell (2017)	Diamonds (2020)

Under Your Spell is the seventh studio album by Canadian electronic rock band the Birthday Massacre, released on June 9, 2017, through Metropolis Records. As before, the album was funded through PledgeMusic.

== Track listing ==
All tracks are written by Chibi, Rainbow and M. Falcore, except where noted.

Under Your Spell track listing
No.	Title	Length
1.	"One"	3:34
2.	"Under Your Spell"	4:31
3.	"All of Nothing"	3:30
4.	"Without You"	4:32
5.	"Counterpane"	3:31
6.	"Unkind"	3:56
7.	"Games"	3:39
8.	"Hex"	3:37
9.	"No Tomorrow"	3:20
10.	"The Lowest Low"	3:53
11.	"Endless"	3:13
Total length:		41:16

Notes

- "One" – Additional writing, programming, production and lyric inspiration by Aaron J. Cunningham (SINS)
- "All of Nothing" – Additional writing, programming, production by Aaron J. Cunningham (SINS)
- "Counterpane" – Lyrics, vocal melody and additional programming by Matthew O'Halloran
- "The Lowest Low" – Additional programming and production by Aaron J. Cunningham (SINS). Lyrics and vocal melody by Matthew O'Halloran
- "Endless" – Additional programming and production by Kevin James Maher

== Personnel ==
Under Your Spell album personnel adapted from CD liner notes.

- Chibi – songwriter, vocals
- Michael Rainbow – songwriting, vocals, production, mixing
- Michael Falcore – songwriting, vocals, production, mixing
- Aaron J. Cunningham – additional songwriting, programming, production and lyric inspiration
- Matthew O'Halloran – songwriting and additional programming
- Kevin James Maher – additional programming and production
- Dave Ogilvie – mix engineer, mixing at Fader Mountain Studios, Vancouver, Canada
- Karl Dicaire – assistant mix engineer
- Noah Mintz – mastering at Lacquer Channel, Toronto, Canada
- Owen MacKinder – album art and design
- Recorded At: Dire Studios (Toronto), The Altar Studios (Toronto, Canada), and Desolation Studios (Toronto, Canada)

== Charts ==
Chart (2017)	Peak position
US Billboard 200	157
US Independent Albums (Billboard)	7
US Top Rock Albums (Billboard)	37
