= Funker Vogt =

German electronic music project

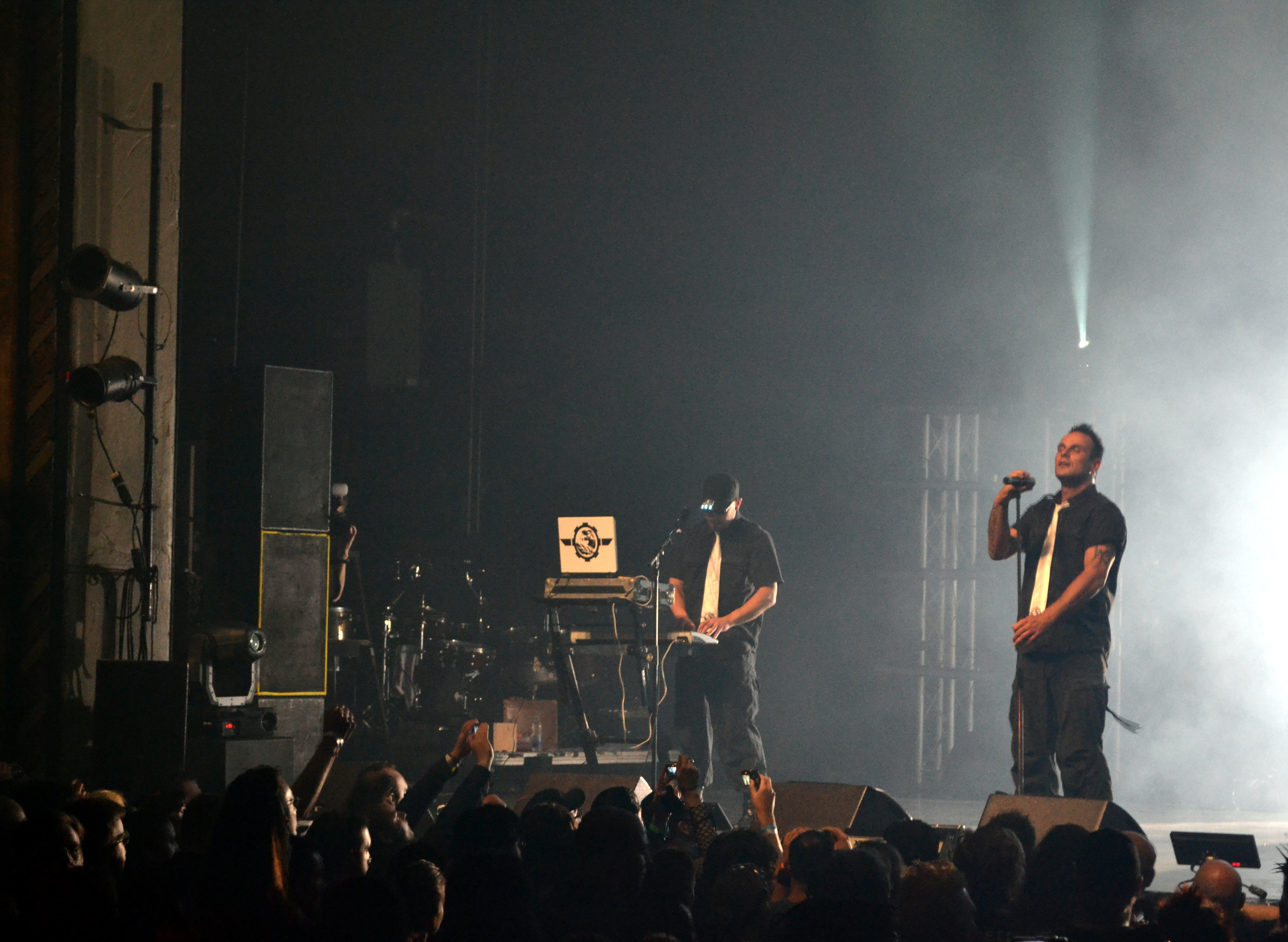
- Funker Vogt in 2011

Background information
- Origin: Hameln, Lower Saxony, Germany
- Genres: Electro-industrial; aggrotech; futurepop
- Years active: 1995–present
- Labels: Metropolis; Bloodline; Zoth Ommog; Synthetic Symphony; Repo
- Spinoffs: Ravenous; Fusspils 11
- Members: Bastian Polak; Gerrit Thomas; René Dornbusch
- Past members: Chris L.; Jens Kästel; Björn Böttcher; Frank Schweigert; Kai Schmidt; Thomas Kroll; Sacha Korn

Funker Vogt (German: [ˈfʊŋkɐ ˈfoːkt]) is a German electronic-industrial music project with an aggressive style, formed by vocalist Jens Kästel and programmer Gerrit Thomas in 1995. Other members of the band are keyboardist/manager Björn Böttcher, live guitarist Frank Schweigert and lyricist Kai Schmidt. The name of the band translates from German to English as "Radio Operator Vogt", this being the surname of a friend of the band who was a military radio operator.

The band ceased in the summer of 2021 due to the termination of cooperation with Chris L.

On 1 January 2023 Funker Vogt announced that they would return.

On 5 December 2023, Bastian Polak joined Funker Vogt as their new lead vocalist. On the same day, they announced their first new album with Bastian, Final Construct, along with a series of new 2024 and 2025 tours. Final Construct released on May 3.

== History ==
The group appeared on several German compilations and, in 1996, released their debut album Thanks for Nothing. Following the release of two limited edition EPs (Words of Power and Take Care), Funker Vogt signed with the American record label Metropolis Records. Metropolis re-released Thanks for Nothing, followed by the We Came to Kill in late 1997. Kästel and Thomas have participated, as remixers, on Leæther Strip album Yes, I'm Limited, Vol. 2. In 2000, Funker Vogt released Maschine Zeit, followed by the remix EP T in early 2001. Additionally to the core members of the band, concert members also include Björn Böttcher (keyboard) and Frank Schweigert (guitar, he replaced Thomas Kroll in 2004). Kai Schmidt writes most of the lyrics and manages the band through his own management company. They all hail from the town of Hamelin in Germany. The majority of their lyrics revolve around the concepts of war.

A distinctive theme is present in the band's work and stage presence; both their musicianship and their costuming are strongly reminiscent of military music and dress. This military aesthetic is also popular with the band's fanbase. However, the political stance of Funker Vogt is decidedly anti-war; the band cites "war and social injustice" as their primary topics of discussion, noting that the goal of the album Execution Tracks, along with the accompanying video, was to "present the grotesque cruelties and the tragedy of war."

According to the band's website, as of 2011 both Björn Böttcher and Kai Schmidt are no longer collaborating with the band. As a result, Funker Vogt will no longer be managed by REPOMANagement. In 2013, longtime frontman Jens Kästel left the band after his last show on 30 November in Berlin. Four years later in 2017 Funker Vogt reformed with a new singer, Chris L. (Agonoize/The Sexorcist).

=== The Hero Trilogy ===
See the main article: The Hero Trilogy With the release of Blutzoll, Funker Vogt have completed their 'Hero Trilogy'. It began with Tragic Hero on the album Execution Tracks, continued with Fallen Hero from Navigator, and was concluded in 2010 with Arising Hero. All three parts of the trilogy were released as promotional singles.

== Members ==
=== Current ===
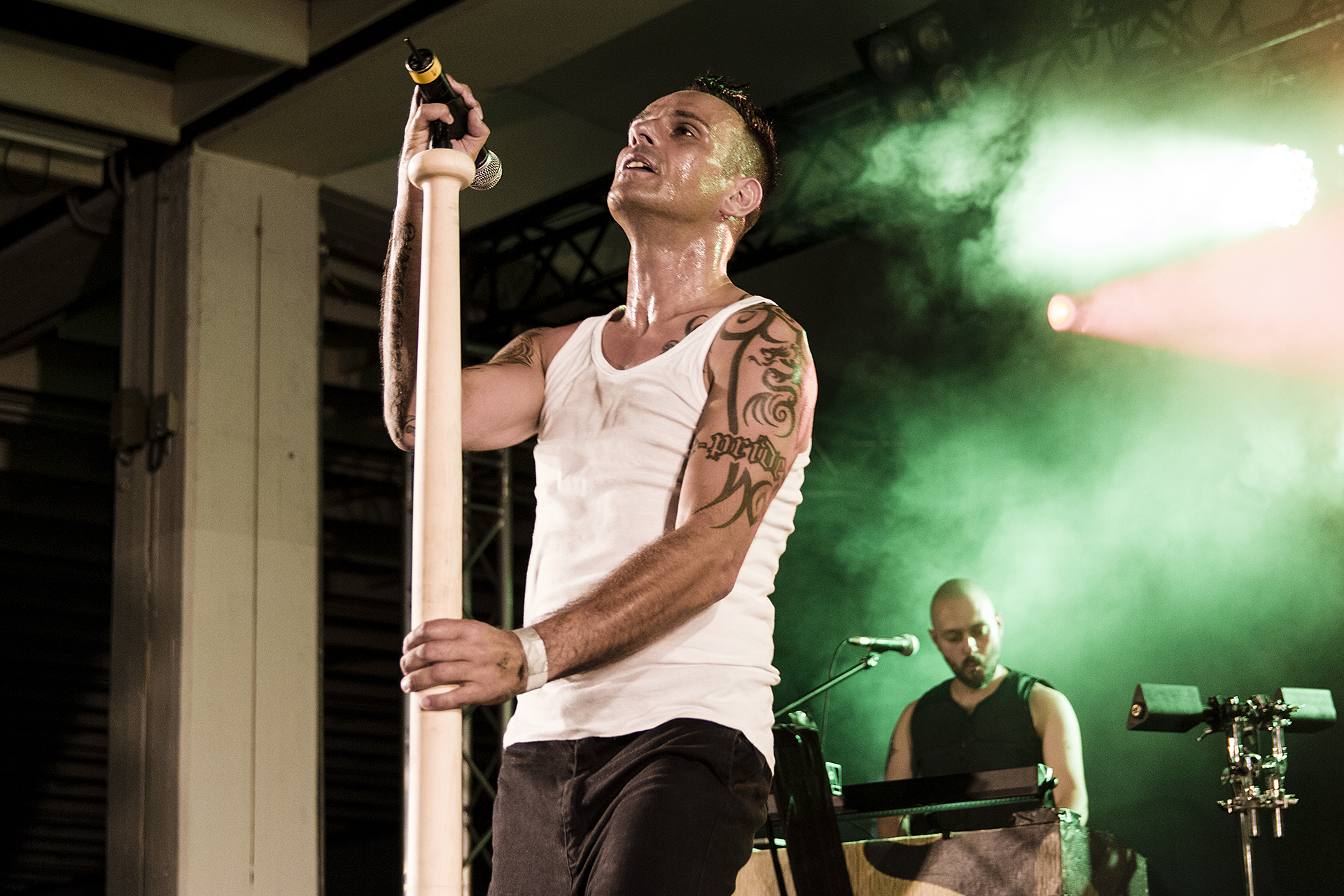
Funker Vogt performing in 2013

- Bastian Polak – lead vocals
- Gerrit Thomas – keyboards, backing vocals, programming
- René Dornbusch – e-drums, backing vocals

Thomas is also in Ravenous, Fusspils 11 and Fictional, and produced a project released in 2012 by Gecko Sector. More recently, Thomas has been involved with Alienare and Eisfabrik.

=== Former ===
- Jens Kästel – vocals
- Björn Böttcher – keyboards
- Frank Schweigert – guitars
- Kai Schmidt
- Thomas Kroll
- Sacha Korn _ vocals
- Chris L. – vocals

== Discography ==
=== Studio albums ===
- Funker Vogt (1995)
- Thanks for Nothing (1996)
- We Came to Kill (1997)
- Killing Time Again (1998) (part new material, part remixes)
- Execution Tracks (1998) – #160 CMJ Radio Top 200; #8 CMJ RPM
- T (2000) (contains 4 new tracks and 10 remixes) – #5 CMJ RPM
- Maschine Zeit (2000) – #28 DAC 2000 Top 50 Albums chart; #9 CMJ RPM Charts
- Survivor (2002)
- Revivor (2003) (remix album)
- Navigator (2005) – #6 DAC Albums
- Aviator (2007)
- Blutzoll (2010)
- Companion in Crime (2013)
- Code of Conduct (2017)
- Wastelands (2018)
- Element 115 (2021)
- Final Construct (2024)

=== Live albums ===
- Warzone K17 (2009) (22 hits from the past 12 years)

=== DVD ===
- Warzone K17 (2009)
- Live Execution '99 (2010) (also features the album T in DVD Audio)

=== Singles and EPs ===
- "Take Care" (1997)
- "Words of Power" (1997)
- "Killing Time Again"
- "Tragic Hero" (1998) – #22 DAC 1999 Top 50 Singles chart
- "Gunman" (2000) – #13 DAC 2000 Top 100 Singles chart
- "Subspace" (2001)
- "Date of Expiration" (2002)
- "Red Queen" (2003) – #6 DAC Singles chart
- "Fallen Hero" (2005) – #6 DAC Singles chart
- "Killing Ground (promo)" (2006)
- "Club-Pilot" (2007)
- "White Trash" (2008)
- "Arising Hero" (2010)
- "Hard Way" (2012)
- "Sick Man" (2014)
- "Der Letzte Tanz" (2017)
- "Feel the Pain" (2018)
- "Ikarus" (2018)
- "Conspiracy" (2020)
- "MC 5f146d107s27p3" (2021)
- "Death Seed " (2024)

=== Maxi-singles ===
- "Velvet Acid Christ Vs Funker Vogt: The Remix Wars – Strike 4" (1999)
- "Code 7477" (2001)

=== Compilations ===
- Always and Forever Volume 1 (2005)
- Always and Forever Volume 2 (2006)

=== Music videos ===
- "Gunman"
- "Subspace"
- "Fallen Hero"
- "The Firm"
- "Hard Way"
- "Sick Man"
- "Ikarus"
- "Feel the Pain"
- "Death Seed "

=== Remixes by Funker Vogt ===
- Modern Talking – You Can Win If You Want (1996)
- Leæther Strip – How Do I Know (Funker Vogt Remix) (1997)
- Juliane Werding – Am Tag, als Conny Kramer starb (1997)
- Front 242 – Headhunter 2000 (Funker Vogt Mix) (1998)
- Leæther Strip – Hate Me! (Funker Vogt Remix) (1998)
- Madness – Drip Fed Fred (2000)
- Assemblage 23 – Disappoint (Funker Vogt RMX) (2001)
- Metallica – Harvester Of Sorrow (2001)
- Cruciform Injection – Lacrimal Involucre (Funker Vogt Remix) (2002)
- Beborn Beton – Dr. Channard (Funker Vogt Remix) (2004)
- Icon of Coil – Simulated (Funker Vogt Remix) (2004)
- Informatik – Flesh Menagerie (Funker Vogt Rmx) (2004)
- Dope Stars Inc. – 10.000 Watts (Funker Vogt Remix) (2005)
- Mindless Self Indulgence – Straight To Video (Funker Vogt Mix) (2006)
- Vigilante – The Other Side (Funker Vogt Remix) (2006)
- Theatre of Tragedy – Motion (Funker Vogt Remix) (2009)
- Suicide Commando – Attention Whore (Posing Overdose Remix By Funker Vogt) (2012)
- Bruderschaft – Return (Funker Vogt Remix) (2013)
- The Prodigy – Narayan (Unknown date)
