= Vincent Marcone =

Canadian web designer, illustrator, director, and musician

Vincent Marcone (born 1973) is a Canadian web designer, illustrator, film director, and musician. He forms one third of the band Johnny Hollow, based in Guelph, Ontario.

== Early life and education ==
Marcone studied graphic design at Conestoga College, graduating in 1998. He also attended the University of Waterloo, where he studied geography. Both institutions are in the Waterloo Region of Southwestern Ontario.

== Career ==
Marcone made his debut with MyPetSkeleton.com, which was received positive reviews and went on to garner awards from Flash Forward Film Festival, the MacWorld Digital Art Expo and Davidbowie.com.

Marcone is also known for his association with the industrial supergroup Jakalope, having co-directed two of the band's videos and the cover art for their 2004 release It Dreams, for which he received a Juno Award in 2005.

In 2008, Marcone co-directed a short horror film, The Facts in the Case of Mister Hollow, with Rodrigo Gudino. That year his band, Johnny Hollow, released its second album, Dirty Hands.

In 2010, Marcone co-founded a digital media company, Imaginarius, with Natalie MacNeil. Two years later he created a short animated film, The Lady ParaNorma.

In 2017, Marcone's artwork was included in a group exhibit at Tingefest in London, Ontario. Also that year Marcone's graphic novel The Lady ParaNorma was nominated for an Aurora Award.

== Filmography ==
- The Facts in the Case of Mister Hollow (2008, director)
- The Lady ParaNorma, short film, 2012
