= Rhim =

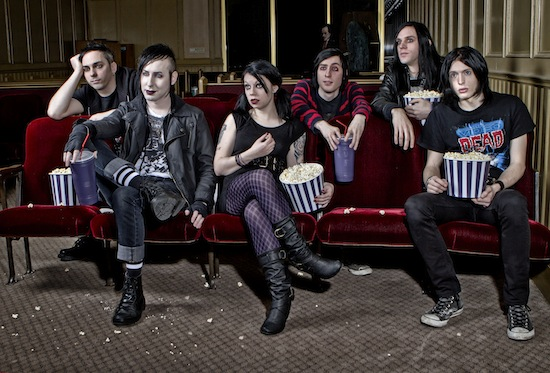
- The Birthday Massacre. Left to right: Rhim, Rainbow, Chibi, Owen, Nate Manor, Michael Falcore

Background information
- Also known as: Jim, Rhim
- Born: James Albert Davis; September 24, 1973 (age 52); Hamilton, Ontario, Canada
- Genres: Electronic rock, industrial rock
- Occupations: Musician, songwriter, sound designer
- Instruments: Drums, percussion
- Years active: 1998–present
- Labels: Metropolis Records, Repo Records
- Website: www.Myspace.com/Rhim

James "Rhim" Davis (born September 24, 1973) is a Dundas, Ontario-based musician, sound designer and animation editor, best known as the former drummer for the band The Birthday Massacre since he joined in 2003. As a sound designer for the St. Catharine's based video game developer Silicon Knights, he worked on games including the Xbox 360 title Too Human.

In 2010, Rhim joined the band Fallon Bowman and the Grace Dynasty. The band played a series of live shows and announced their forthcoming debut album. Soon after the recording of the album, the decision was made for Fallon Bowman to drop the Grace Dynasty from the band's name and to continue it as solo project. The album, Human Conditional, was released on January 25, 2011.

Previously, he played and recorded with Toronto rock band Aphasia (now known as A Primitive Evolution) and Canadian singer/songwriter Mike Lynch. Also, he was a member of both the Niagara and Hamilton Youth Orchestras.

James endorses ddrum acoustic drums and Dream cymbals.

He currently works in animation at Hamilton-based Pipeline Studios.
