= Our Pain, Your Gain =

Video by Mindless Self Indulgence
- Released: September 11, 2007
- Recorded: July 8, 9 and 10, 2005; Webster Hall, New York, New York
- Length: Main Feature: 68:35
- Label: Uppity Cracker/Metropolis
- Director: Doug Spangenberg

Our Pain, Your Gain is the first live DVD release by the New York punk band Mindless Self Indulgence, released on September 11, 2007. The DVD is compiled from three shows the band played at Webster Hall in New York in July 2005.

== Track listing ==
1. "The End" – 1:58
2. "Begin Already!" – 0:46
3. "Faggot" – 2:04 (Note: Frankenstein Girls Will Seem Strangely Sexy)
4. "Dicks" (a.k.a. "Dicks Are for My Friends") – 1:19
5. "Clarissa" – 1:55
6. "One Word" – 0:24
7. "Shut Me Up" – 2:54 (Note: You'll Rebel to Anything)
8. "Revenge" – 2:16
9. "Backmask" – 2:23
10. "1989" – 2:14
11. "Golden I" – 2:10
12. "Word" – 0:34
13. "Stupid MF" – 2:33
14. "2 Hookers" (a.k.a. "2 Hookers & An Eightball") – 2:30
15. "What Do They Know?" – 3:07
16. "Planet of the Apes" – 2:20
17. "Capitol P" – 2:17 (Note: Despierta Los Niños EP)
18. "Position" – 0:43
19. "Prom" – 2:26
20. "Uncle"– 3:10
21. "7-11" – 1:35
22. "Bring The Pain" – 4:01 (Note: Tight)
23. "I Hate Jimmy Page" – 2:55
24. "Tom Sawyer" – 3:01
25. "Song" – 0:29
26. "Kill the Rock" – 2:03
27. "Bullshit" – 3:02
28. "Straight to Video" – 3:37
29. "Bitches" – 3:29
30. "Scissors" – 4:08

The songs are available on the following albums:

== Bonus features ==
The DVD includes both the original and final versions of the music video for "Shut Me Up", storyboards, a "making of" slideshow, the music video for "Straight to Video" with a "making of" slide show, and two fan-made videos:

- Bjaw Bjaw Productions:

Directors/editors: Zak Keck, Alex Morrison
Camerawork: Zak Keck, Alex Morrison, Veronica Francis, Ty Prieto, Jake Deschamps, Calvin Kuntze
Actors (in order of appearance): Alex Morrison, Zak Keck, Ty Prieto, Scott Orzech, Audrey Webb, Brian Wan, Jake Deschamps, Krista Kutlik, Emily Walsh, Bernard Viray
Produced and funded by Bjaw Bjaw Productions.

- "Happy Fun Rand" video by Veronica Francis and Ty Prieto

And Mike Diva:

Written, directed and edited by: Mike Dahlquist
Starring: Mike Dahlquist and Maxx Jamez
Shot by: John Mijares
Special thanks to: Jeff Miller
