= List of stage names: U =

This list of stage names lists names used by those in the entertainment industry, alphabetically by their stage name's surname (or the best approximation) followed by the given name (or the best approximation) where the surname begins with "U". One-word stage names are presented in List of one-word stage names.

Stage name	Birth name	Life	Notability	Notes
N.U. Unruh	Andrew Chudy	1957–	German musician (Einstürzende Neubauten)	
Minerva Urecal	Florence Dunnuck	1894–1966	American actress	
Jimmy Urine	James Euringer	1969–	American singer and songwriter (Mindless Self Indulgence)	
Oderus Urungus	David Brockie	1963–2014	Canadian-American musician (Gwar)	
