= Pink (Mindless Self Indulgence album) =

Compilation album by Mindless Self Indulgence
- Released: September 18, 2015
- Recorded: 1990–1997
- Genre: Industrial rock, electronic rock, electro-industrial
- Length: 54:44
- Label: Metropolis, Uppity Cracker
- Producer: James Euringer

Mindless Self Indulgence chronology
How I Learned to Stop Giving a Shit and Love Mindless Self Indulgence (2013)	Pink (2015)	MSI B-Sides Vol. 1 (2024)

Singles from Pink
- 1. "Personal Jesus" Released: November 3, 2014

Pink is a compilation album by Mindless Self Indulgence released on September 18, 2015, the 20th anniversary of the release of their debut album, Mindless Self-Indulgence.

Professional ratings
Review scores
Source	Rating
AllMusic	3/5 stars

== Title and content ==
Pink was the title of a long rumored unreleased album, which was abandoned in favor of the cover of Method Man's Bring the Pain and the subsequent album, Tight.

The album consists of nineteen remastered versions of previously unreleased songs recorded between 1990 and 1997, including cover versions of Depeche Mode's "Personal Jesus" and Duran Duran's "Girls on Film". Four of these tracks were taken from their long out of print 1995 debut album ("Unsociable", "Do Unto Others", "Bed of Roses", and "Do Unto Others, Pt. 2").

The track, "Angry Boy", is an audio diary recorded by lead singer Jimmy Urine at age 22. A music video for "Personal Jesus", directed by David Yarovesky, was released on November 5, 2015.

== Critical reception ==
Soundscape found that the album "draw[s] together" Mindless Self Indulgence's previously released albums. They note that while "not a masterpiece," it is not just fan-service. They also point out the variable production quality across tracks, though they see this as an upside. Reflections of Darkness found the album a "prequel" to Mindless Self Indulgence's other albums, acting as an explanation of where the band came from, including the band's name itself. ReGen Magazine said, "PINK is not just for MSI completists; the album is a marvelous insight into the origins of one of modern music’s most singular entities."

== Track listing ==
All tracks are written by James Euringer except "Personal Jesus" written by Martin Gore and "Girls On Film" by Simon Le Bon, John Taylor, Roger Taylor, Andy Taylor and Nick Rhodes.

No.	Title	Length
1.	"Personal Jesus (1997)"	2:05
2.	"This Hurts (1995)"	2:21
3.	"Be Like Superman (1996)"	2:44
4.	"Memory of Heaven (1993)"	3:01
5.	"Vanity (1994)"	2:48
6.	"Married Alive (1992)"	2:12
7.	"Girls on Film (1994)"	2:58
8.	"5TR82HE11 (1994)"	3:00
9.	"Envy (1994)"	3:10
10.	"Device (1994)"	3:27
11.	"Out of my Minds (1995)"	2:20
12.	"Darling Young Boyz (1993)"	1:49
13.	"For the Love of God (1995)"	2:13
14.	"Slim (1992)"	2:03
15.	"Do Unto Others (1991)"	3:19
16.	"Bed of Roses (1992)"	4:20
17.	"Unsociable (1990)"	2:49
18.	"Do Unto Others, Pt. 2 (1992)"	3:20
19.	"Angry Boy (1992)"	4:38
Total length:		54:44

== Personnel ==
- Jimmy Urine – vocals, lyrics, producer, arranger, recording, programming, mixing, artwork
- Chantal Claret – additional vocals
- Greg Reely – mastering (tracks 1 and 7)
- Jennifer Dunn – artwork
