= Chainsaws in popular culture =

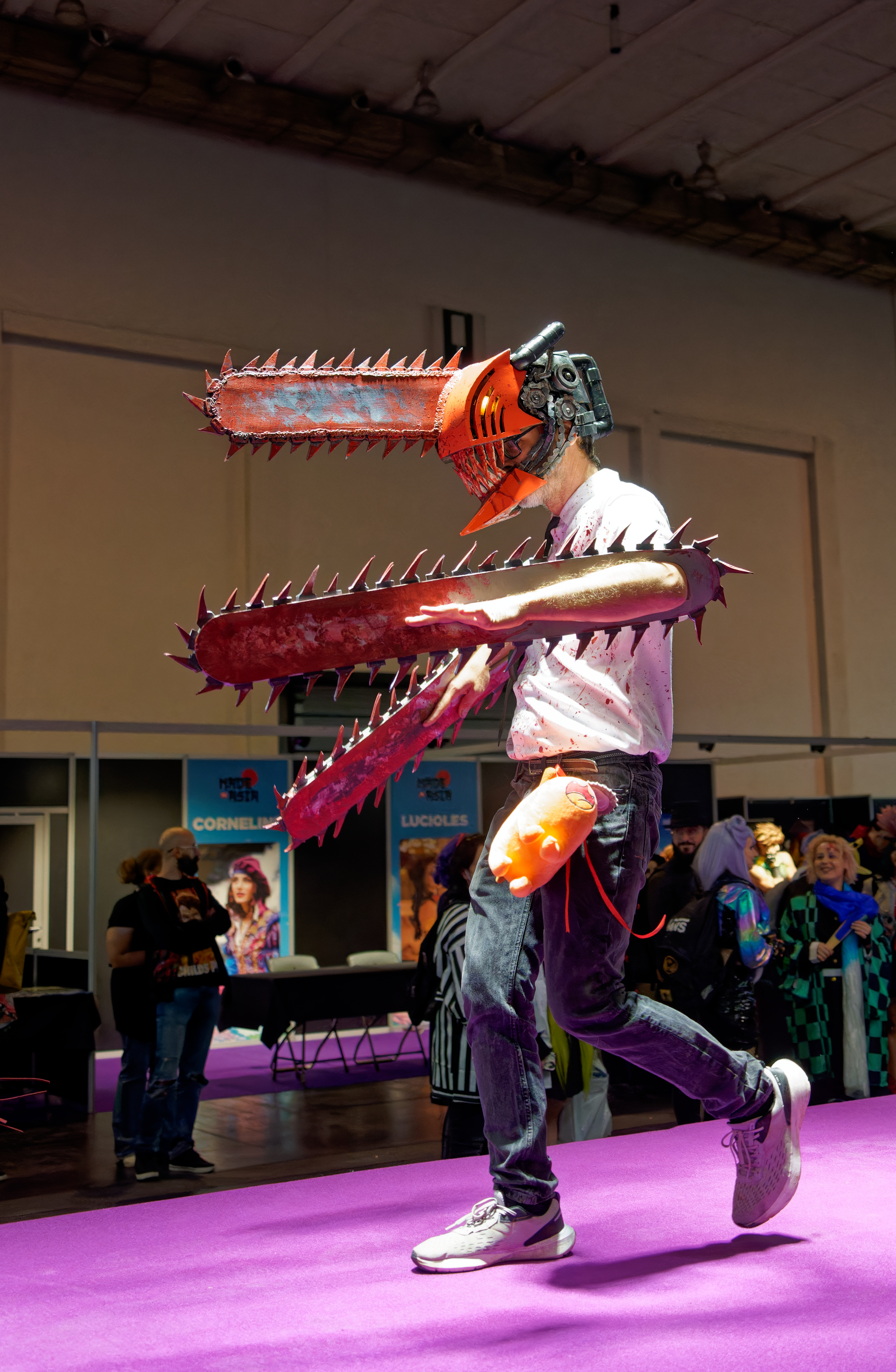
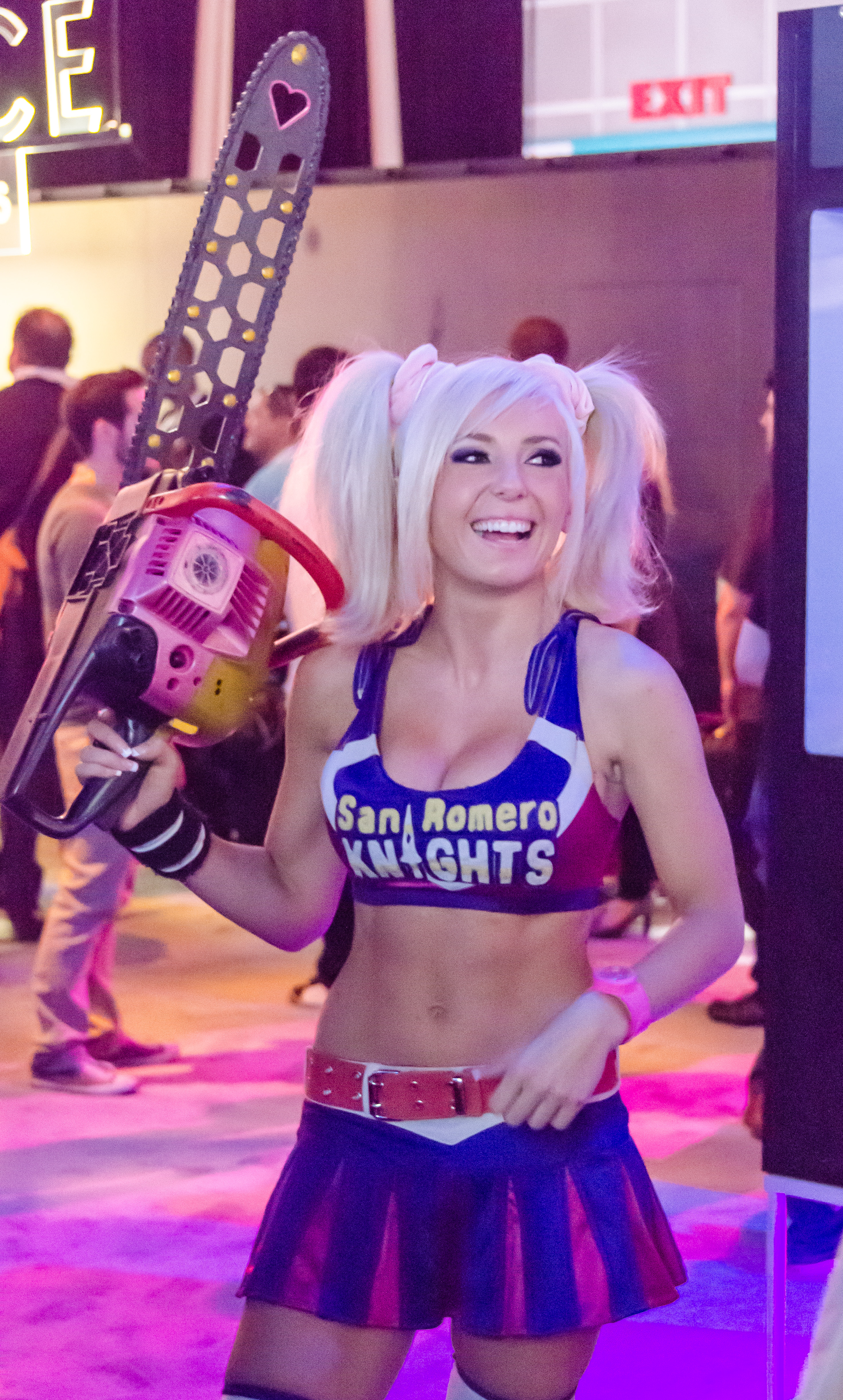
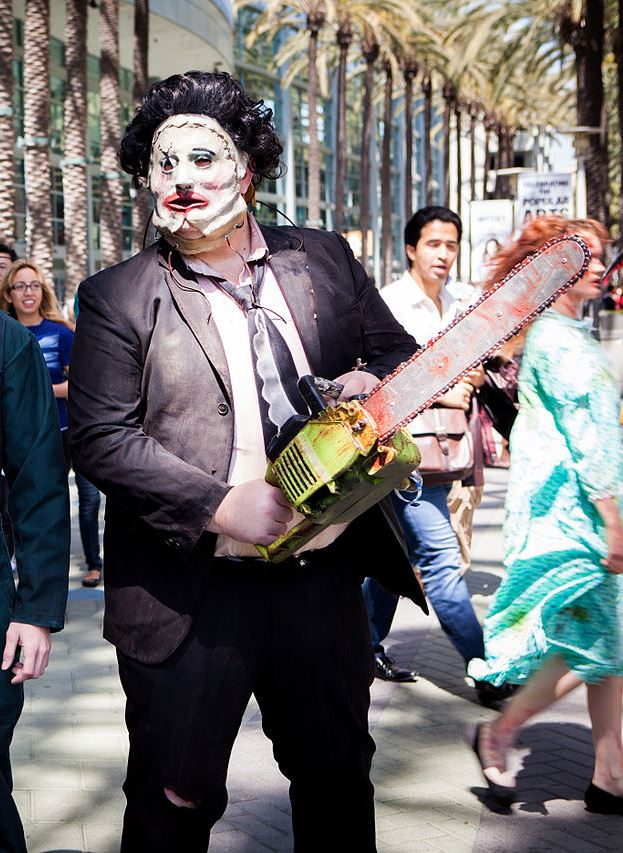
Cosplayers as Denji, Juliet Starling and Leatherface, characters who are known for using chainsaws

Chainsaws, which are commonly used tools in logging and woodworking in real life, are also a common sight in popular culture, where they tend to be used as weapons.

== Film ==
Chainsaws have appeared in countless films being used for their intended purpose, but this rarely, if ever, is given a prominent role in the plot. More prominent, however, is portrayals of chainsaws as improvised weapons or torture devices.

Despite chainsaws having been around since the 1930s, they were not seen being used as a weapon in film until the 1960s, possibly due to Hays Code censorship restrictions on portrayals of graphic violence.

Among the earliest films to portray chainsaws as weapons are Dark of the Sun (1968) and The Wizard of Gore (1970). Wes Craven's 1972 film The Last House on the Left was referred to as the "original Chainsaw Massacre" in advertising campaigns during later re-releases.

In 1974, Tobe Hooper's The Texas Chain Saw Massacre was released. The film, loosely based on infamous murderer Ed Gein (though unlike the killers in the film, Gein did not use chainsaws), etched the chainsaw into the public mind as an object of gruesome terror. It was followed by a direct sequel, two standalone sequels, and in 2003, a remake, which received its own prequel. Following its release, many horror films, especially low-budget ones, began to incorporate chainsaw gore scenes, a trend that continues to the present day.

In 1987, Sam Raimi's Evil Dead II featured a protagonist using a chainsaw for heroic purposes. (The previous film also contained a chainsaw, but it was ultimately not used for violence). In one of the film's sequences, protagonist Ash Williams attaches a chainsaw to his stump to replace a severed hand (which he had removed with the same chainsaw), marking a point where the protagonist quits running from the demon and chooses to fight. The chainsaw hand had appearances in the film's sequel and various spin-offs, symbolizing the will to fight.

Due to the high level of gore associated with the chainsaw's use as a weapon, appearances outside of the horror genre were uncommon. One notable one was in Brian De Palma's 1983 gangster film Scarface, where a scene depicted a Colombian gangster dismembering another gangster to extract information.

In the 1996 film Forest Warrior, a scene was included depicting immortal spirit John McKenna (played by Chuck Norris) stopping a logger's chainsaw with his bare hand. The scene became memetic online; one clip posted to YouTube in 2011 gained over 5 million views within three years.

In the Sharknado franchise, the protagonist is Fin Shepard who fight sharks in tornadoes with a chainsaw to protect his family.

== Television ==
Due to television's higher level of censorship, chainsaw violence is rare and usually only described with both the attack and the damaged body left unseen. An example of this is an episode ("Born Again") of The X-Files revolving around the ghost of a police officer dismembered with a chainsaw by corrupt colleagues; all flashbacks skip over the actual murder.

One notable exception is the series Dexter in which chainsaw attacks are occasionally seen, most notably in dreams and flashbacks regarding the protagonist's mother's death. This is due to the larger amount of content freedom given to programs created for pay television, of which the series is one. Dexter Morgan also uses a chainsaw at some points.

Chainsaws have made appearances in cartoon series, usually as a source of comedy. These have ranged from more young-adult audience fare (The Simpsons, Family Guy) to even children's series, for instance the series The Grim Adventures of Billy & Mandy contains a chainsaw-wielding character based on Evil Dead's protagonist Ash. In the manga and anime adaptation of Black Butler, a chainsaw was prominently featured as Grell Sutcliff's personalized Deathscythe. In the manga and anime Chainsaw Man the protagonist Denji can transform into a human-chainsaw hybrid by pulling a cord protruding from his chest.

CSI: Crime Scene Investigation has used chainsaws in one storyline, highlighting their potential for serious accidents. What was apparently the massacre of two victims by a third perpetrator was then revealed to be an inexperienced operator who had caused a kickback accident that killed both himself and a bystander.

In the early days of the remote-controlled robot combat shows Battlebots and Robot Wars, many robots were armed with chainsaws, because converting the tool into a remote-controlled weapon was a simple task. Their use declined as builders began developing custom-made kinetic-energy weapons that could do far more damage.

== Video games ==
The first chainsaw appearance in a video game was the 1983 Texas Chainsaw Massacre Atari game. This game, with antagonist Leatherface chasing down victims on a highway for points, though, had low sales and limited exposure due to many stores refusing to sell it.

Chainsaws were used as weapons in the 1970s and 1980s horror film-inspired cult Splatterhouse game series, and used by enemies in some "beat 'em ups" (such as the Robocop arcade game).

The Doom franchise features a chainsaw as one of the Doomguy's recurring weapons.

Some horror games in which chainsaws are used as weapons include the Resident Evil series, Dead Rising, Dead Rising 2, the Silent Hill series, Manhunt, Dead Space, Left 4 Dead 2, MadWorld, No More Room in Hell, and the Evil Dead spin-off games.

Chainsaws also appear in organized crime-themed video games. These include the Grand Theft Auto series (starting with the Scarface-inspired GTA: Vice City), 50 Cent: Bulletproof, Saints Row 2, and Scarface: The World Is Yours.

Chainsaw-inspired weapons have also made appearances in sci-fi war games. Some examples include the chainsaw bayonets in the Gears of War series, the "Ripper" chainsaw-knife of the Fallout series, and the "chainswords" seen in games based on the Warhammer 40,000 franchise. Chainsaw-based weaponry can be seen in the popular Facebook game Battle Stations, where it exists as a large-scale, ship-mounted melee weapon.

In Lollipop Chainsaw, the heroine Juliet Starling uses a chainsaw as a primary weapon of the game.

The character Dorothy in Stella Glow uses a chainsaw as one of her primary weapons.

In Shadow Warrior 2, the player character Lo Wang can use multiple types of chainsaws, including ones resembling swords.

In Toontown: Corporate Clash (an MMO based on Toontown Online), the Chainsaw Consultant Bossbot has a chainsaw as a part of his head.

== Music ==
American rapper Eminem uses a chainsaw in his Slim Shady persona, styled on The Texas Chain Saw massacre.

== Object of comedy ==
Although the original portrayals of chainsaw violence worked on its capacity to inflict gory damage upon a human body or sadistically produce pain, its prominence in low-budget B-movies has since produced a separate image of the chainsaw as a comedic, often campy expression of over-the-top terror.

This image is often drawn upon in cartoons, comedy series, and comedy films. It has appeared occasionally as part of the post-Scream wave of self-referential horror, for instance David Arquette's The Tripper.

A stereotype of comedic chainsaw portrayal is a chainsaw-wielding lunatic in a hockey mask (seen for example in the Simpsons episode "Cape Feare"). Horror cinema's archetypal hockey-mask killer Jason Voorhees has never actually been portrayed wielding a chainsaw in a film, though chainsaws have been used against him in some films.

The band Arrogant Worms has a song called "Malcolm", in which the title character "solves his problems with a chainsaw and he never has the same problem twice".

== Sports ==
The Portland Timbers soccer team's mascot, Timber Joey, cuts off a slab of wood from the team's victory log using a chainsaw after each Timbers home goal. The players who scored the goal get to keep the slice of wood.

== Politics ==
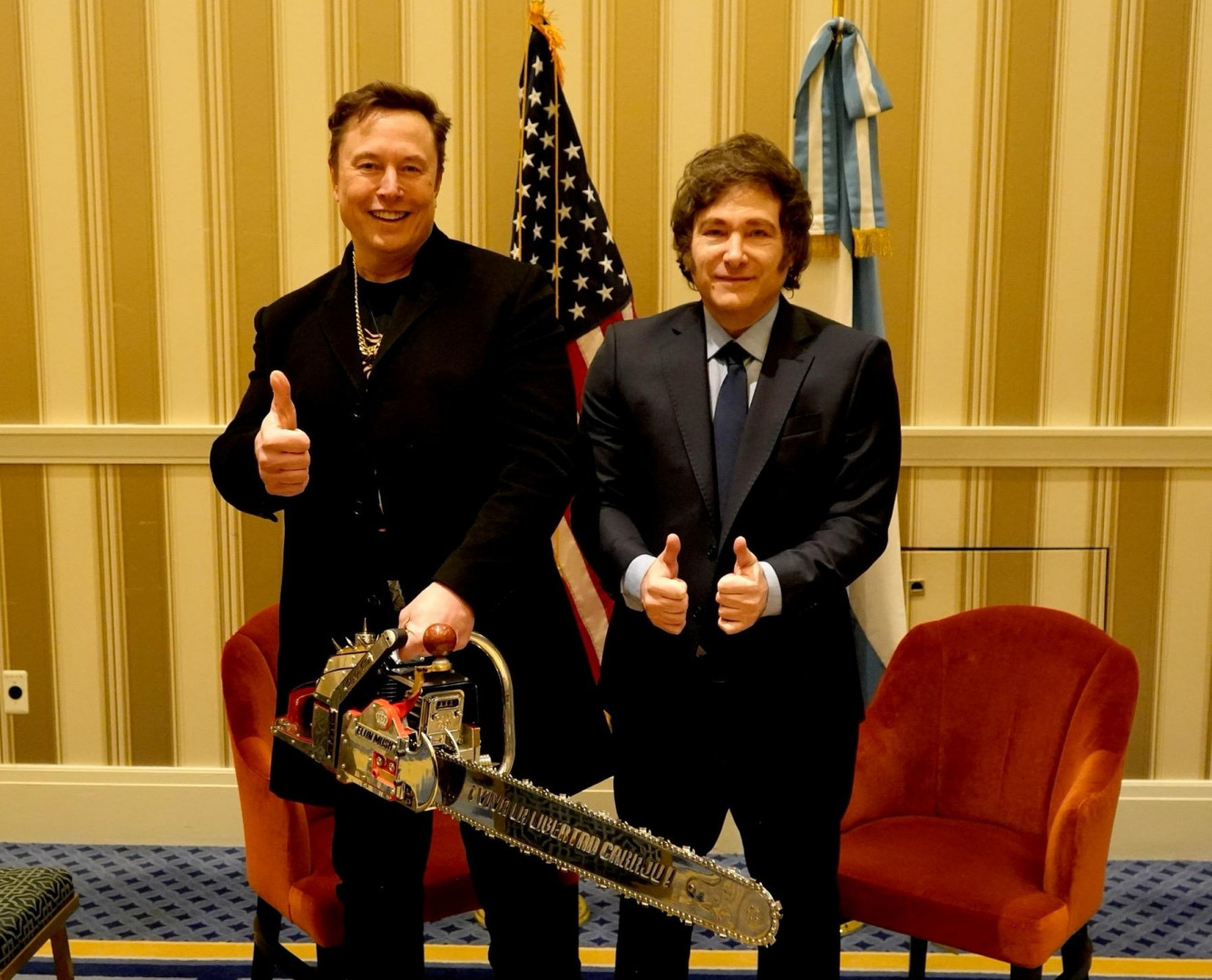
Javier Milei and Elon Musk hold a chainsaw during a meeting in National Harbor, Maryland.

In the campaign leading to the 2023 presidential elections in Argentina, candidate Javier Milei made heavy use of a chainsaw as a metaphor for public spending cuts, a key proposal of his bid for office.

In 2025 Elon Musk was gifted a chainsaw during a public event as a symbol for the United States Department of Government efficiency he was heading at the time. During the event, he nicknamed the saw the "Chainsaw for Bureaucracy".

== Relation to reality ==
Despite their substantial ability to inflict damage on living creatures, real-life chainsaw attacks and murders are uncommon. This likely is due to their heavy, unwieldy weight, loud noise, risk of user injury, and high price compared to other potential close-quarters weapons, although those same drawbacks make them weapons with a formidable value of intimidation.

One real chainsaw murder is referred to in interviews with Brian De Palma as having been the inspiration for the chainsaw scene in Scarface. The real case, which De Palma apparently saw crime-scene photos of while researching the film, involved multiple victims and bodies stuffed into metal drums. De Palma described the murder as part of his appeal that Scarface should be passed with an R certificate on the basis that graphic content was based in reality as screenwriter Oliver Stone had gleaned from months of research with both police officers (some of whom testified in the film's defense) and actual drug traffickers.
