= Webster Hall =

Nightclub in Manhattan, New York

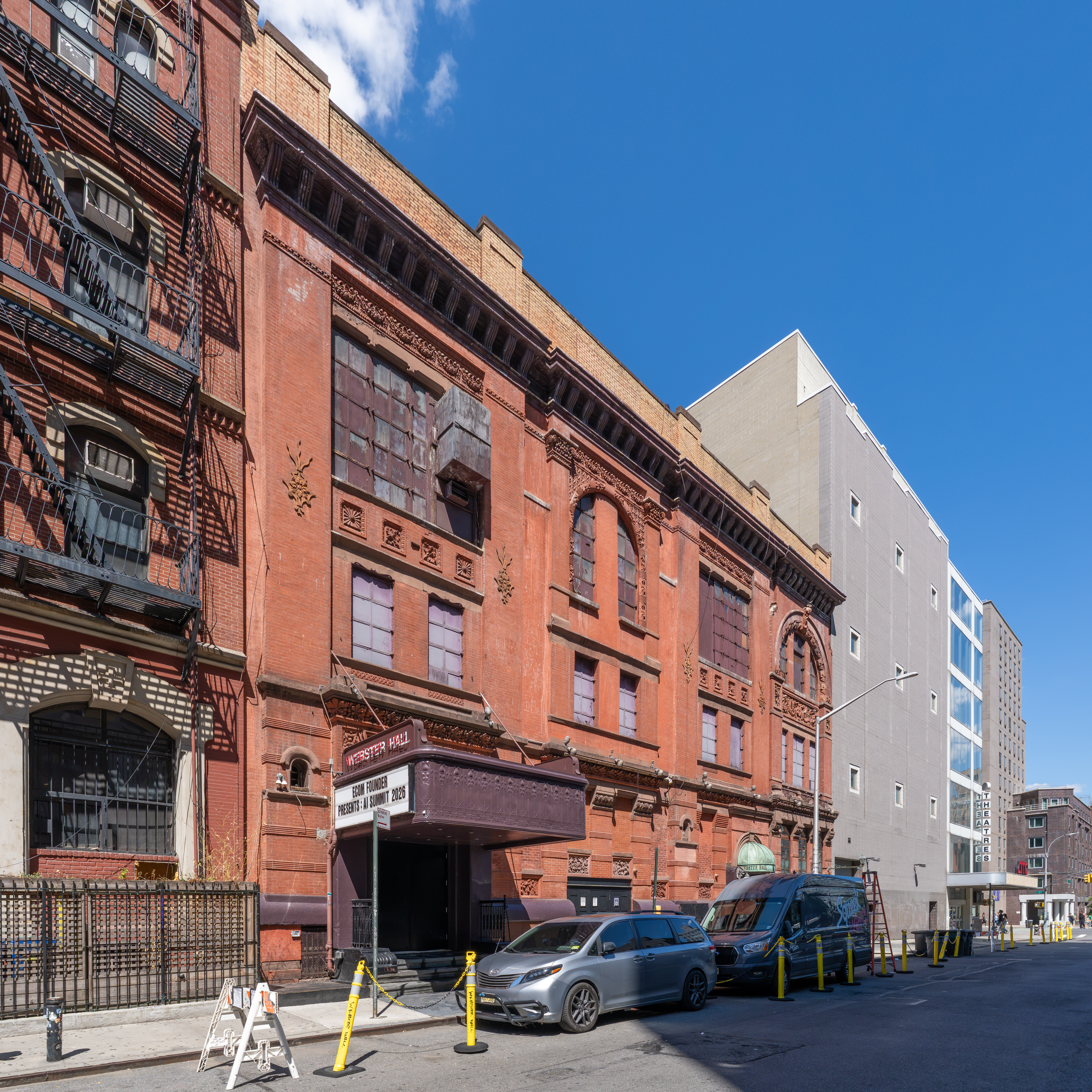
- Webster Hall in 2026
- Interactive map of Webster Hall
- Former names: The Ritz
- Address: 119–125 East 11th Street
- Location: New York City
- Owner: Unity Gallega (Casa Galicia of New York)
- Operator: AEG Presents, Brooklyn Sports Entertainment and The Bowery Presents
- Capacity: Grand Ballroom: 1,500; Marlin Room: 600; Studio: 400
- Type: Concert venue, nightclub
- Public transit: New York City Subway: at 14th Street–Union Square at Third Avenue

Construction
- Built: 1886
- Renovated: 2018

Website
- www.websterhall.com

Webster Hall and Annex
- 40°43′54″N 73°59′21″W

Site notes
- Architect: Charles Rentz
- Governing body: private

New York City Landmark
- Designated: March 18, 2008
- Reference no.: 2273

Webster Hall is a nightclub and concert venue located at 125 East 11th Street, between Third and Fourth avenues, in the East Village of Manhattan, New York City. It is one of New York City's most historically significant theater and event halls, having hosted social events of all types since the club's construction in 1886 as a "hall for hire". Its current incarnation was opened in 1992 by the Ballinger brothers, with a capacity of 1,400, providing its traditional role as well as for corporate events, and for a recording studio. (Note: It used to have a capacity of 2,500 people – including the club; 1,500 for the Grand Ballroom, 600 for the Marlin Room at Webster Hall and 400 for the Studio at Webster Hall.) A scholarly account of Webster Hall and its place in the wider history of rock music in Lower Manhattan was published in 2020.

Webster Hall has been recognized as the first modern nightclub. On March 18, 2008, after a landmarks proposal was submitted by the Greenwich Village Society for Historic Preservation, the New York City Landmarks Preservation Commission designated Webster Hall and its Annex a New York City landmark.

BSE Global and The Bowery Presents (and Bowery's parent company AEG) acquired the operating rights for and assets of Webster Hall in February 2017, and after a nearly two-year renovation, the venue re-opened to the public on April 26, 2019.

== 1886–1940 ==
Webster Hall was built in 1886 by architect Charles Rentz in the Queen Anne style and topped with an elaborate mansard roof. Six years later in 1892, Rentz was hired to design an addition to the building, occupying the site of 125 East 11th Street and designed in the Renaissance Revival style using the same materials as the original building. Throughout the early twentieth century the building was plagued by fires, which occurred in 1902, 1911, 1930, 1938, and 1949. The original mansard roof was likely lost in one of these fires.

Originally commissioned by Charles Goldstein – who operated the hall and also lived in the Annex with his family until his death in 1898 – the building was a "hall for hire" from its inception. The first decade or so of Webster Hall's existence saw it host countless labor union rallies, weddings, meetings, lectures, dances, military functions, concerts, fundraisers and other events, particularly those focused on the working-class and immigrant population of the surrounding Lower East Side neighborhood. Although it also hosted many high-society functions catering to the uppertens of the city, the hall earned a reputation as a gathering place for leftist, socialist, Anarchist and labor union activity very early on.

In 1912, Emma Goldman, the outspoken exponent of Anarchism, free love and birth control, led a march that brought the children of striking Lawrence, Massachusetts millworkers to the hall for a meal in order to dramatize the struggles of the working class. In 1916, it was used as the strike headquarters for the International Ladies' Garment Workers' Union; in 1920 meetings of the Sacco and Vanzetti Defense Committee were also held at Webster Hall.

In the 1910s and 1920s, Webster Hall became known for its masquerade balls and other soirees reflecting the hedonism of the city's Bohemians. Nicknamed the "Devil's Playhouse" by the socialist magazine The Masses, Webster Hall became particularly known for the wilder and more risque events of the time; Marcel Duchamp, Joseph Stella, Man Ray, Francis Picabia, Charles Demuth, F. Scott Fitzgerald, Langston Hughes, Bob Brown, and many other notables regularly attended events there during this time.

The coming of Prohibition did not restrict the availability of alcohol at these events. Local politicians and police were said to turn a blind eye to the activities; at one time it was rumored that the venue was owned by the mobster Al Capone. The repeal of Prohibition was the reason for one of Webster Hall's biggest celebrations, "The Return of John Barleycorn".

In 1938, reporting on a fire in the building, The New York Times wrote: "Webster Hall ... began by seeing redcheeked debutantes introduced to society and ended – if ended it has – by seeing red-nosed bohemians thumbing defiance at society."

== 1950–1979 ==
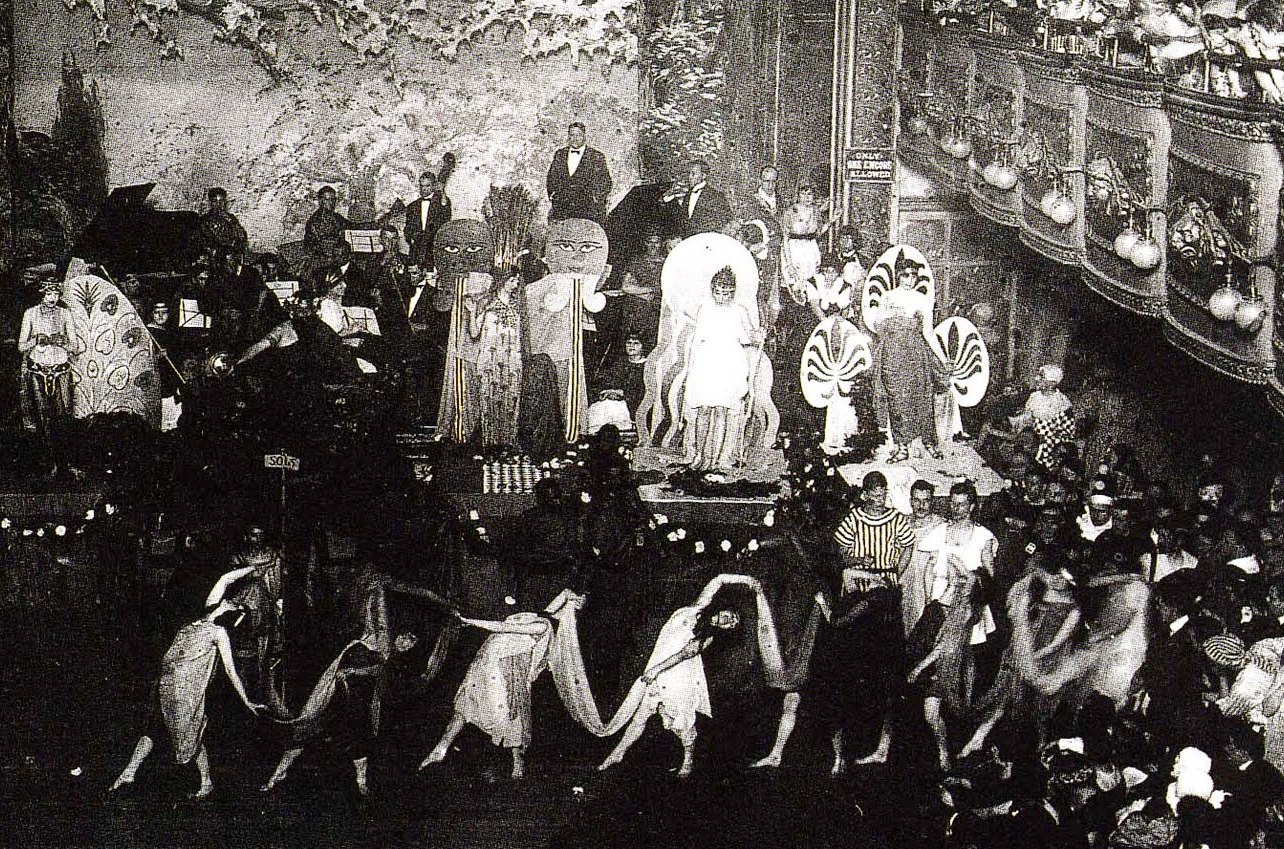
A costume ball in the Grand Ballroom of Webster Hall 1920s

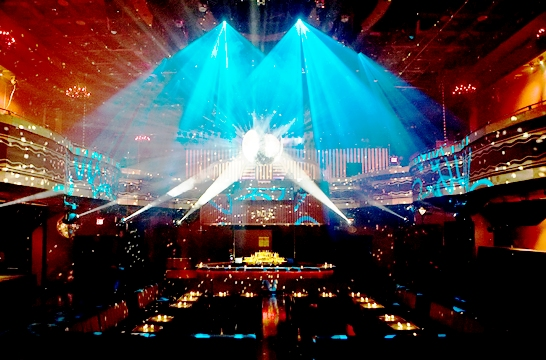
Webster Hall's Grand Ballroom in its current form

In the 1950s, Webster Hall began featuring concerts from a diverse group of artists. Latin performers, such as Tito Puente and Tito Rodriguez, played at the club. So, too, did folk artists Pete Seeger and Woody Guthrie. From 1953 to 1968, RCA Records, recognizing the acoustical integrity of the Grand Ballroom, purchased the building and began operating Webster Hall as their East Coast recording venue, Webster Hall Studios. Carol Channing recorded "Hello, Dolly!" there, Venezuelan conductor Aldemaro Romero recorded his debut album Dinner in Caracas, Harold Prince recorded Fiddler on the Roof, and artists such as Julie Andrews, Harry Belafonte, Tony Bennett, the Guarneri Quartet, Liza Minnelli, Ray Charles, Perry Como, Sergio Franchi, Peter Nero, Elvis Presley, Arthur Rubinstein, Frank Sinatra, and Hugo Winterhalter all recorded in the studio.

On February 2, 1962, Bob Dylan was recorded playing harmonica on the title track of Harry Belafonte's Midnight Special album, marking Dylan's recording debut. The Music Theatre of Lincoln Center albums of Broadway shows recorded between 1964 and 1969 were all made at Webster Hall, but without a live audience, and in 1966, the recording of Handel's Giulio Cesare starring Norman Treigle and Beverly Sills was recorded at the Hall for RCA. In October 1968, Bill Evans recorded his Grammy Award-winning album Alone for Verve Records.

In 1970, Unity Gallega, also known as Casa Galicia of New York, purchased the site and remains the current owner of the property. Unity Gallega (Casa Galicia) is a cultural organization representing people from Galicia, Spain, in promoting and preserving their cultural ties.

== 1980–2016 ==
On May 1, 1980, The Ritz opened by Jerry Brandt in the Webster Hall building as a showcase venue for emerging rock acts. Tina Turner, Eric Clapton, The Pretenders, Prince, Sting, Aerosmith, U2, Book of Love, Cro-Mags, Kiss, B.B. King, and Guns N' Roses all performed routinely. The Ritz was the first prominent nightclub to feature a video component.

When the Ritz relocated in 1989, it gave Webster Hall the opportunity to be reborn. In 1992, the Ballinger brothers (Lon, Stephen, Douglas, and Peter) from Toronto unveiled the restored Webster Hall, featuring state of the art audio, video, and lighting technology with the original color scheme recreated. The venue hosted two or three different genres of music at once on weekend evenings, providing rave/house music in their large dance room and rock in the upstairs billiard area. This facility is capable of catering to groups of 100 to 2,000, Madonna, Mick Jagger and Bill Clinton have had events there, as has the World Wrestling Federation TNA Wrestling and the taping of Fuji Television Network's Iron Chef "New York Special" between Bobby Flay and Masaharu Morimoto. The venue offers five different rooms.

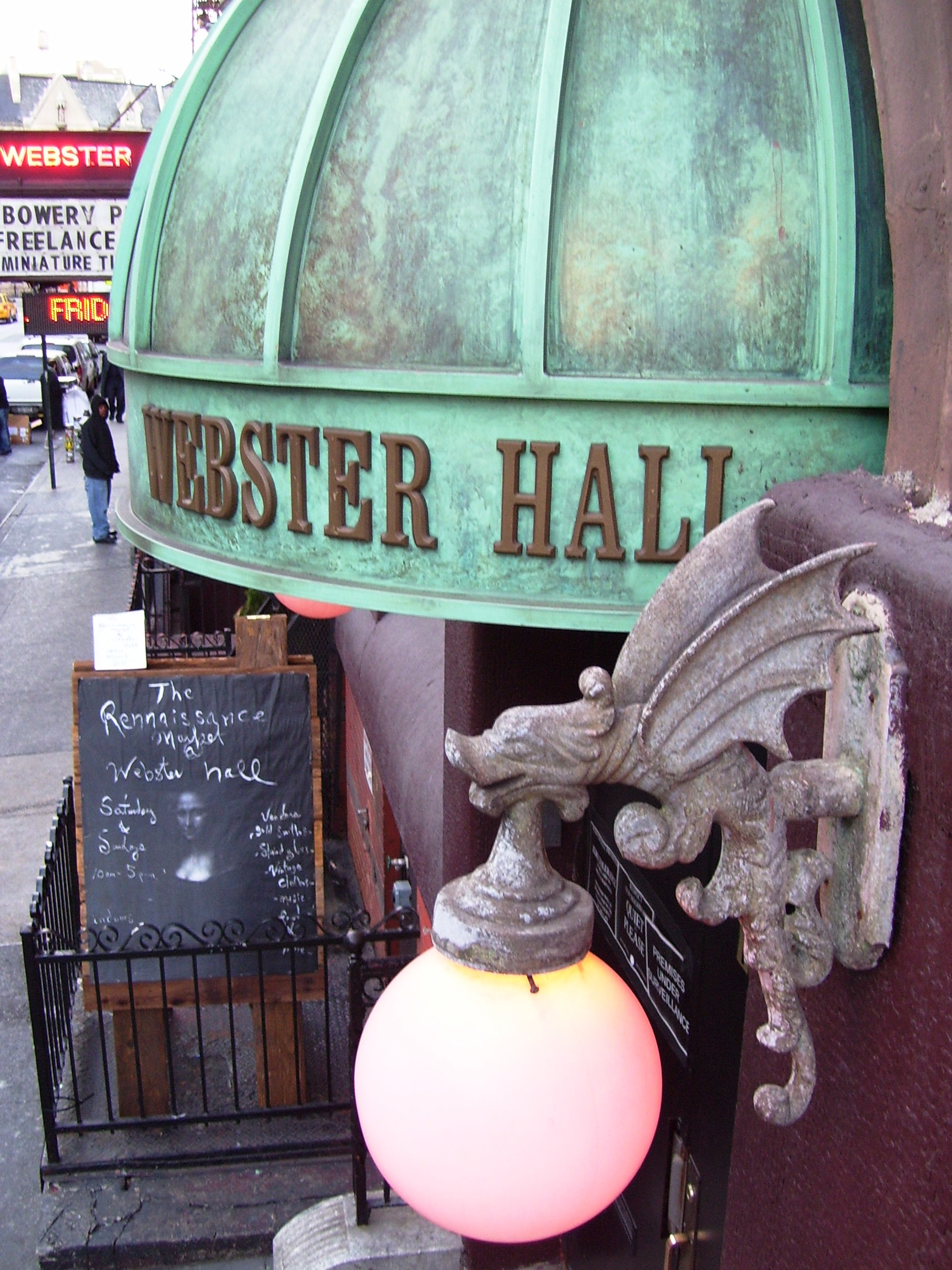
Canopy and lighting sconce over side door

As real estate development pressure grew exponentially in the East Village during the 2000s, the Greenwich Village Society for Historic Preservation saw the need to protect the scale and character of many of the East Village's unique historic structures. In the summer of 2007, GVSHP supplied the Landmarks Preservation Commission with extensive research on the history of Webster Hall, and urged the LPC to landmark the site. Shortly thereafter the LPC commissioners voted to consider the building for landmark designation and in spring 2008 the building was officially designated a New York City landmark, recognizing its significant role in the cultural development of the Village. From 1993-1997, and starting again in 2008 through today, Gerard McNamee has been the director of Webster Hall, hiring all of the current staff members and guiding the club through its most prestigious period.

In addition to its weekly club nights, Webster Hall is one of the city's premiere live music venues. It is the exclusive live music venue for AOL's New York Broadband Rocks series. In 2005, Mindless Self Indulgence recorded three nights of performance (July 8th, July 9th and July 11th, 2005) for their 2007 live DVD, Our Pain, Your Gain. On May 11, 2007, Linkin Park filmed their Minutes to Midnight Promo Concert, which was then released into theatres. The club entered into a partnership to present The Bowery Ballroom Presents at Webster Hall concert series, which has already brought such acts as Sonic Youth, Infected Mushroom, The Hives, John Mayer, John Butler and Modest Mouse to the mainstage. In October 2008, "The Studio at Webster Hall", a 300 to 400 scalable capacity performance room, opened. Bowery Presents' contract with Webster Hall expired in August 2014, and Webster Hall chose to take all their concert bookings "in-house", led by Heath Miller. Since taking their concert bookings in house for all events starting in August 2014, Webster Hall has gone on to present acts such as Charli XCX, Tove Lo, Buzzcocks, Clean Bandit, Wiz Khalifa, American Football, Bleachers, CocoRosie, James, MØ, Gus Dapperton, Chet Faker, Modern Baseball, Metallica, Green Day, Lenny Kravitz, Faith No More, LCD Soundsystem, JoJo, Good Charlotte, Capital Cities, and Yo La Tengo amongst others.

In fall of 2016 trade publication, Pollstar nominated the venue for their Nightclub of the Year Award. The club won the award at Pollstar's annual award ceremony at Pollstar Live! the following February.

== 2017–2019 ==
It was announced on April 2, 2017, that Webster Hall had been sold to Brooklyn Sports Entertainment, a unit of Anschutz Entertainment Group – known as AEG. On May 4, all employees were served termination notices. On May 22, it was reported that Webster Hall would close in mid-August for approximately two years, and would reopen in late 2019 or early 2020 as Spectrum Hall, which would be strictly a concert and sports facility.

In July 2017, Gerard McNamee, the club's director, officially announced that the venue would close after the final show on August 9, 2017, and that it had been purchased by Brooklyn Sports Entertainment. The closing, to update the building's infrastructure for modern use, was planned to be for a period of three years. After that, AEG will present fewer dance nights and more concerts.

After a $10 million renovation and makeover, Webster Hall re-opened on April 26, 2019, with a concert by Jay Z.
