= On It =

Single by Mindless Self Indulgence

from the album If
- Released: July 8, 2008
- Recorded: 2006–2008
- Genre: Electropunk
- Length: 26:00
- Label: Uppity Cracker/The End
- Songwriter: James Euringer

Mindless Self Indulgence singles chronology
"(It's 3AM) Issues" (2008)	"On It" (2008)	"Evening Wear/Mark David Chapman" (2009)

"On It" is a single by American electropunk band Mindless Self Indulgence, released in the U.S. on July 8, 2008. The single reached number 2 on the Billboard Hot 100 Singles Sales chart.

It was released as part of a three-disc set titled IT.

== Track listing ==
1. "On It" (Original Radio Mix)
2. "On It" (KMFDM Remix)
3. "On It" ("Grinder Mix" by Hollowboy)
4. "On It" (The Tweaker Mix by Chris Vrenna)
5. "On It" (Assemblage 23 Mix)
6. "On It" (Remix by Antron 2600 of 8-bit Suicide)
7. "Make Me Cum" (Original Demo)
