= Shut Me Up =

Single by Mindless Self Indulgence

from the album You'll Rebel to Anything
- Released: September 12, 2006
- Recorded: 2004
- Genre: Industrial rock; new rave; electropunk
- Length: 2:48
- Label: Uppity Cracker/Metropolis
- Songwriter: Little Jimmy Urine

Mindless Self Indulgence singles chronology
"Straight to Video" (2005)	"Shut Me Up" (2006)	"Mastermind" (2008)

Music video
- "Shut Me Up" on YouTube

"Shut Me Up" is a single by Mindless Self Indulgence, released on September 12, 2006. It is the first track on their third studio album, You'll Rebel to Anything. The song is considered one of Mindless Self Indulgence's classic songs.

== Music video ==
The music video for "Shut Me Up" was directed by Jhonen Vasquez and stars Joshua Burian-Mohr as a young man who works a monotonous retail job and goes insane shortly after attending a concert by the band, when he is goaded by a hand puppet (operated by Vasquez) into attacking rude customers. He then experiences seizures and explodes. The video also features clips from Reefer Madness.

== Track listing ==
1. "Shut Me Up" (Ulrich Wild Groandome Metal Mix) – 2:56
2. "Shut Me Up" (VNV Nation 1200 XL Mix) – 5:40
3. "Shut Me Up" (Tommie Sunshine TSMV Still Filthy Mix) – 5:38
4. "Shut Me Up" (Original Crappy Demo) – 1:55
5. "Big Poppa" (Notorious B.I.G. cover) – 3:57
6. "Adios Amigos" – 2:24
7. "Straight to Video" (Suicide City More and Faster Mix) – 2:55
8. "Straight to Video" (Tommie Sunshine Extended Electro Mix) – 5:57

== Charts ==
Weekly chart performance for "Shut Me Up"
Chart (2006)	Peak position
US Hot Singles Sales	7
US Dance Singles Sales	1

== See also ==
- List of Billboard number-one dance singles of 2006
