= How I Learned to Stop Giving a Shit and Love Mindless Self Indulgence =

Studio album by Mindless Self Indulgence
- Released: May 14, 2013
- Genres: Industrial rock, synth-punk
- Length: 35:35
- Labels: Uppity Cracker; Metropolis
- Producer: Jimmy Urine

Mindless Self Indulgence chronology
Tighter (2011)	How I Learned to Stop Giving a Shit and Love Mindless Self Indulgence (2013)	Pink (2015)

Singles from How I Learned to Stop Giving a Shit and Love Mindless Self Indulgence
- 1. "It Gets Worse" Released: December 3, 2013; 2. "Fuck Machine" Released: February 14, 2014

How I Learned to Stop Giving a Shit and Love Mindless Self Indulgence is the sixth studio album by American electropunk band Mindless Self Indulgence. The album was funded through a Kickstarter campaign started on October 25, 2012, which reached its goal on December 24, 2012. After several demos were released via YouTube, the album began production. The cover art and track listing were released for people who had backed the campaign on March 12, 2013. Digital downloads from Kickstarter were released on March 13, 2013. The official album release occurred on May 14, 2013. The album was released through Metropolis Records with a bonus track; a cover of Supertramp's "The Logical Song". The name of the record is a reference to the film Dr. Strangelove or: How I Learned to Stop Worrying and Love the Bomb and a reflection of the band "being themselves and loving the work that they do".

== Critical reception ==
Professional ratings
Review scores
Source	Rating
Allmusic	4/5 stars
Consequence of Sound	3/5 stars

The album generally received positive reviews. David Jeffries of AllMusic described the album as "the loudest, angriest, and most creative kraken since their 2005 album You'll Rebel to Anything", while also writing: "Think Ministry on helium and without the "do good" attitude, then sign up for duty, but only if your karma can take a significant hit." Derek Staples of Consequence of Sound wrote: "Although MSI’s messages generally lack the depth of electro-punk/industrial brethren like KMFDM, they’re still capable of divulging wisdom beneath a cloak of tongue-in-cheek satire."

== Track listing ==
All tracks are written by James Euringer, with "Witness" additionally written by Chantal Claret, and "You're No Fun Anymore Mark Trezona" additionally written by Rhys Fulber.

How I Learned to Stop Giving a Shit and Love Mindless Self Indulgence track listing
No.	Title	Length
1.	"Witness"	3:17
2.	"Fuck Machine"	3:24
3.	"It Gets Worse"	2:56
4.	"I Want to Be Black"	2:10
5.	"Hey Tomorrow Fuck You and Your Friend Yesterday"	2:40
6.	"You're No Fun Anymore Mark Trezona"	2:53
7.	"Ala Mode"	2:32
8.	"Casio"	2:14
9.	"Anonymous"	2:03
10.	"Kill You All in a Hip Hop Rage"	2:30
11.	"Stalkers (Slit My Wrists)"	2:39
12.	"Jack You Up"	3:34
13.	"Ass Backwards"	2:55
Total length:		35:35

Kickstarter exclusive digital deluxe bonus tracks
No.	Title	Length
14.	"Angel"	2:14
15.	"I Am Not Here to Make Any Friends"	2:53
16.	"Last Gay Song"	2:18
Total length:		43:00

Kickstarter exclusive digipack CD bonus track
No.	Title	Length
14.	"Sex for Homework"	3:14
Total length:		38:49

Tour version CD bonus track
No.	Title	Length
14.	"Seven Minutes in Heaven"	2:13
Total length:		37:48

Regular CD and iTunes bonus track
No.	Title	Writer(s)	Length
14.	"The Logical Song" (Supertramp cover)	Roger Hodgson	4:01
Total length:			39:36

== Personnel ==
How I Learned to Stop Giving a Shit and Love Mindless Self Indulgence album personnel adapted from digital download liner notes.

Mindless Self Indulgence

- Jimmy Urine – vocals
- Steve, Righ? – guitars
- Kitty – drums
- Lyn-Z – bass

Additional personnel

- Jimmy Urine – production, arrangements
- Chantal Claret – guest vocals on tracks 5, 7, 8, 10, and 13
- Rhys Fulber – mixing, additional production
- Rob Kleiner – additional vocal production on track 1
- Greg Reely – mastering
- Jorden Haley – album art
- Jennifer Dunn – additional design
- Jeremy Saffer – photography

== Charts ==
Chart (2013)	Peak position
US Billboard 200	103
