= Never Wanted to Dance =

Single by Mindless Self Indulgence

from the album If
- Released: March 18, 2008
- Recorded: 2007
- Genre: Dance-punk
- Length: 29:24
- Label: Uppity Cracker/The End
- Songwriter: James Euringer

Mindless Self Indulgence singles chronology
"Mastermind" (2008)	"Never Wanted to Dance" (2008)	"Pay for It" (2008)

Alternative cover
- 7" cover

"Never Wanted to Dance" is a single by the American electropunk group Mindless Self Indulgence, released in the US on March 18, 2008. The single reached number 1 on the Billboard Hot 100 Singles Sales chart.

Released in the U.S. as a CD of 6 remixes, it was later released in the UK as a 2-part CD single, and a 7" record on August 25, 2008.

"Never Wanted to Dance" is on the soundtrack to Madden NFL 09 and the Combichrist Electro Hurtz Mix is on the soundtrack for Need for Speed: Undercover.

== Music video ==
The music video for "Never Wanted to Dance" was uploaded onto the band's YouTube account at midnight on August 6, 2008. The video primarily involves a party with a Dance Dance Revolution SuperNova machine, with people dancing to the song on the machine. The band members perform within the game itself on one of the wireframe stages, which were introduced by that specific version of the game. In the end, the police come and raid the party, arresting almost everyone.

== Track listing ==
All songs by J. Euringer except where noted

=== US single ===
1. "Never Wanted to Dance" (Ulrich Wild Voluptuous Metal Mix) - 3:13
2. "Never Wanted to Dance" (Combichrist Electro Hurtz Mix) - 4:52
3. "Never Wanted to Dance" (The Birthday Massacre Mix) - 3:38
4. "Never Wanted to Dance" (Tommie Sunshine [Tsmv] Mix) - 7:13
5. "Never Wanted to Dance" (Spider Dub Remix) - 7:53
6. "Never Wanted to Dance" (The Birthday Massacre Acapella Mix) - 2:37

=== US Radio promo ===
1. "Never Wanted to Dance" (Clean Radio Edit)
2. "Never Wanted to Dance" (Tommie Sunshine Radio Remix)

=== UK CD single 1 ===
1. "Never Wanted to Dance" (explicit album mix) – 3:09
2. "(It's 3AM) Issues" (Million $ Mano Remix) – 3:20
3. "My World" (original demo) – 2:49

=== UK CD single 2 ===
1. "Never Wanted to Dance" (explicit album mix) – 3:09
2. "Pay for It" (The Son of a Clown Remix - remixed by M. Shawn Crahan) – 4:07
3. "Make Me Cum" (original demo) – 2:48

=== 7" single ===
A1. "Never Wanted to Dance" (explicit album mix) – 3:08
B1. "On It" (KMFDM Remix) – 3:32
B2. "Greatest Love of All" (original demo) (Michael Masser, Linda Creed) – 2:46
