= Gerard McNamee =

American actor (born 1969)

Gerard McNamee Jr.
- Born: 1969 (age 56–57); The Bronx, New York, U.S.
- Education: Fordham University
- Occupations: Actor, director, musician, art curator
- Known for: Former Director of Webster Hall
- Website: www.gerardgerard.com

Gerard McNamee Jr. (born 1969) is an American actor, singer, art curator, producer, and director. He was the director of operations of New York City's Webster Hall and the curator of the venue's Quarterly Art Soirée.

== Early life and career ==
The eldest of five children, McNamee was born to Helen Scales and Gerard McNamee, an NYC transit police (NYPD) officer. He was educated at Our Lady of Mercy Grammar School in Hicksville, Long Island and St. Mary's Boy's Preparatory High School in Manhasset, Long Island. As the son of Irish immigrants, he was raised on traditional Irish and country music and would later be influenced by the music of The Clash, The Rolling Stones, and The Pogues. McNamee began an early DJ career after his introduction to a family friend's music rig and six-inch-high plywood riser. McNamee would purchase a DJ deck of his own and begin producing block parties and neighborhood events.

After graduating from Fordham University, Rose Hill with his BS in Business Administration, McNamee was hired as the Director of Operations of Webster Hall. In May 1997, McNamee left Webster Hall to pursue his own business ventures. He purchased a bar in Hunter Mountain, named SixMileCross in homage to his father's hometown in Northern Ireland. Over the next several years, he would open additional locations of The Cross in Montauk, Long Island, and City Island, Bronx, New York.

Responding to the 1998 terrorist bombing in Omagh, Co. Tyrone, Northern Ireland, where he has traveled to his entire life, McNamee penned "A Moment of Silence" in honor of the victims.

== Webster Hall ==
Following his graduation from Fordham University, McNamee replied to a classified advertisement in The New York Times that read "Night Club Manager Wanted, 40,000 square feet of adventure... 5 years New York City experience necessary... Fax Resume." McNamee's experience had been in operating and booking bands and DJs at the Bronx River Yacht Club. He was hired by Lon, Steve, and Doug Ballinger in January 1993 to run Webster Hall. During his tenure as Director of the venue, McNamee hosted a multitude of stars. In 1997 McNamee left Webster Hall to pursue a business and acting career. McNamee returned to the venue in 2008. During this period, the club would attain recognition as the number one nightclub in New York City. According to Pollstar, as of August 1, 2016, Webster Hall was the #1 Club Venue in New York by concert ticket sales and #2 in the world.

Artists who performed during McNamee's tenure include:

Metallica	Tame Impala	The B-52's	The Mighty Mighty Boss Tones
Kings of Leon	Green Day	Diplo	Chance the Rapper
Madonna	Patti Smith	The Killers	Zeds Dead
President Bill Clinton	Vampire Weekend	Waka Flocka Flame	Chromeo
Tom Petty	Lady Gaga	Faith No More	Wiz Khalifa
Paul Simon	Axl Rose	Nate Ruess	Vance Joy
Skrillex	Tiësto	Muse	Lenny Kravitz
Noel Gallagher	Arctic Monkeys	Jessie J	Snoop Dogg
Liam Gallagher	Nine Inch Nails	The Brian Jonestown Massacre	
White Stripes	Paul Simon	The Wombats	

Following a concert in 2008, McNamee met art curator Jenny Mushkin-Goldman with whom he would found The Quarterly Art Soirée to restore Webster Hall's history of presenting classical arts, charity benefits, and emerging artists in the spirit of Marcel Duchamp.

In July 2017, McNamee officially announced via Facebook post that Webster Hall's historical home had been purchased by Brooklyn Sports Entertainment, a unit of Anschutz Entertainment Group known as AEG, with a planned three-year closure to allow for updating and futureproofing of the building's infrastructure. Former venue staff, including McNamee, honored the history of the hall through the "end of an era" concert series featuring Michelle Branch, Good Charlotte, Action Bronson, Skrillex, and Nine Inch Nails.

== Acting career ==
McNamee is a member of SAG-AFTRA and has acted in co-starring roles on USA network's White Collar, Fox's The Following, Netflix's The Get Down and indie films Hip Priest, and A Killing Day. In 2017/2018 he featured in Volkswagen's national ad campaign for the 2018 Atlas SAE called America, set to the soundtrack "America" by Simon & Garfunkel.

During the making of a documentary on Webster Hall's history, McNamee met with film director Gregg De Domenico who would write and shoot the short film Hip Priest for him. In an interview with the New York Daily News, De Domenico was quoted saying "[McNamee] has a James Dean, old-world movie-star presence.” Hip Priest premiered at Grauman's Chinese Theatre as part of the Holly Shorts Film Festival and showed at the National Gallery of Art in Washington, D.C. McNamee began moonlighting as an actor while continuing his duties as curator, spokesman, and director.

Over the years, McNamee has been featured as a singer at the Our Land Festival at Lincoln Center and at Joe Hurley's Irish Rock Revue at Joe's Pub at the Public Theatre, Highline Ballroom, and Soho House in New York City.

== Personal life ==
In 1994, McNamee's brother, Brian, died in a fire in Burlington, Vermont. McNamee maintains a close relationship with his parents, Gerard Sr and Helen, his sisters, Eileen and Mary Clare, and their children, Ruadhan, Noah, and Emilia.
