= Lollipop Chainsaw =

2012 video game

- Developer: Grasshopper Manufacture
- Publishers: JP: Kadokawa Games; WW: Warner Bros. Interactive Entertainment; RePOP: WW: Dragami Games
- Directors: Tomo Ikeda; Suda51
- Producers: Masa Shidara; Masahiro Yuki
- Artist: NekoshowguN
- Writers: Masahiro Yuki; James Gunn
- Composers: Akira Yamaoka; Mac Nobuka; Jimmy Urine
- Engine: Unreal Engine 3
- Platforms: PlayStation 3 Xbox 360; RePOP; Nintendo Switch; PlayStation 5 Windows; Xbox Series X/S; PlayStation 4 Xbox One; Nintendo Switch 2
- Release: NA: June 12, 2012; AU: June 13, 2012; JP: June 14, 2012; EU: June 15, 2012; RePOP; Nintendo Switch, PS5, Windows, Xbox Series X/S: WW: September 12, 2024; AS: September 26, 2024; PS4, Xbox One: WW: December 2, 2024; Nintendo Switch 2: WW: May 28, 2026
- Genres: Action-adventure, hack and slash
- Mode: Single-player

Lollipop Chainsaw (Note: Japanese: ロリポップチェーンソー, Hepburn: Roripoppu Chēnsō) is a 2012 action-adventure game developed by Grasshopper Manufacture. A collaboration between game designer Goichi Suda (also known by his nickname Suda51) and filmmaker James Gunn, the game was published in Japan by Kadokawa Games and internationally by Warner Bros. Interactive Entertainment.

Lollipop Chainsaw features Juliet Starling (voiced by Tara Strong in English and by both Eri Kitamura in the Xbox 360 version and Yoko Hikasa in the PlayStation 3 version in Japanese—with limited uncensored versions allowing the player to change between the two voices after completing the game once), a cheerleader zombie hunter fighting zombies in a fictional California high school.

Lollipop Chainsaw was released for PlayStation 3 and Xbox 360 in June 2012. The game's reception was divided. Japanese critics praised the game's combo centered gameplay and the satirical storyline, while Western critics felt that the game's repetitious gameplay and crude storyline were detracting factors. Nonetheless, the game garnered a cult following and was a commercial success, selling over 1.24 million units by June 2024.

A remaster titled Lollipop Chainsaw RePOP was released for Nintendo Switch, PlayStation 5, Windows, and Xbox Series X/S in September 2024, with versions for PlayStation 4 and Xbox One released in December 2024. A version for Nintendo Switch 2 was released in May 2026.

== Gameplay ==
Lollipop Chainsaw is a hack-and-slash video game in which players play as Juliet Starling as she fights through hordes of zombies. Juliet can use melee attacks, dodges and high and low attacks with her chainsaw. Zombies can be beaten into a groggy state, during which they can instantly be killed with a chainsaw attack. Gold medals can be earned by defeating zombies, smashing objects, and rescuing classmates. These medals can be spent at Chop2Shop.zom stores found throughout each level where Juliet can purchase new moves and combos, as well as items that can increase her stats. Sparkle Hunting is achieved when Juliet kills three or more zombies simultaneously or in quick succession and rewards platinum medals that can be spent on other goodies such as unlockable costumes, music, and artwork.

As the game progresses, Juliet will also receive the Chainsaw Dash, which allows her to charge with her chainsaw and fly off-ramps, and the Chainsaw Blaster, a long-range weapon used for blasting enemies and obstacles. Throughout the game, Juliet can also collect lollipops which allow her to recover health. The maximum number of lollipops Juliet can hold depends on the difficulty setting. Juliet will die if she loses all her health or fails certain scenarios, though, in the case of the former, Juliet may be able to come back to life by winning a roulette spin.

Throughout her journey, Juliet is accompanied by her boyfriend, Nick, who is a disembodied head hanging from her waist. At certain points in the game, Nick's head can be attached to a decapitated zombie's body, during which the player will rhythmically press buttons in order to have him move about and clear the way for Juliet. By obtaining 'Nick Tickets', Juliet can activate the 'Nick Roulette' in which various moves can be performed using Nick's head, such as a bombarding attack or making masses of zombies groggy. By filling up her star meter by defeating zombies, Juliet can activate a special state which powers up her chainsaw for a limited period, allowing her to easily defeat zombies and obtain Sparkle Hunting more easily.

== Plot ==
On Juliet Starling's 18th birthday, she goes to the front park of San Romero High School to meet her boyfriend Nick Carlyle, who is going to meet her family for the first time. Unfortunately, a zombie outbreak has occurred, which leads to Juliet fighting them off on her way to meet Nick. When she arrives, Nick is bitten in her place to protect her from a zombie. To prevent him from turning, Juliet decapitates him.

When he comes to, Nick discovers he is somehow still alive, despite being a severed head, and so Juliet reveals to him that she and her family are zombie hunters, and that she performed a magical ritual on him to save his humanity. Juliet attaches Nick's head to her belt, and she meets her tutor, Junji Morikawa, who explains that the Universe is divided into three realms – Earth; the Land Beyond Words, a heavenly realm where souls reside; and the Rotten World, an infernal realm where demons and zombies reside – and that somebody has cracked open a portal between the realms to bring forth the zombie outbreak. Juliet and Morikawa encounter the person responsible for the outbreak, an evil goth named Swan, who summons five intelligent zombies called the Dark Purveyors to the world, which are stereotypes of different aspects of music centered on themes of rock and roll. Morikawa attempts to stop Swan but he is mortally wounded.

Swan sends the first Dark Purveyor, Zed (representing punk rock), after Juliet, but she kills him and sends him back to the Rotten World. Zed, however, utters a Latin chant as he dies, which all the other Purveyors do as well upon their deaths. Morikawa tells Juliet to purify the school and kill the four remaining Purveyors to save the world before dying.

Juliet hunts down the Purveyors while being helped by her sisters Cordelia and Rosalind. Juliet encounters Vikke (viking metal), the second Dark Purveyor, whom she duels on board his airborne longship and sends back to the Rotten World. The longship crashes into a farm, where Juliet is attacked by Mariska (psychedelic rock), the third Dark Purveyor, but Juliet defeats her and sends her back to the Rotten World. Juliet's father Gideon arrives and takes her back to the city, where they infiltrate an amusement arcade to rescue Rosalind, who has been captured by Josey (funk), the fourth Dark Purveyor. Juliet defeats Josey and saves Rosalind.

Finally, with only one Dark Purveyor left, Juliet's family all team up to enter a cathedral in the heart of the city, where the fifth and final Dark Purveyor, Lewis Legend (rock and roll), lurks. Upon accessing his lair, Juliet fights and kills Lewis. Swan appears and reveals that he allowed Juliet to kill all the Dark Purveyors so the true zombie lord could be returned to this world, and the Latin phrases they chanted when defeated were part of an incantation to summon him. Seeking revenge against the world for the bullying he endured at school and his unrequited love for Juliet, Swan shoots his head off to finish the ritual and is absorbed along with the rest of the undead into a vortex, which solidifies into the zombie of all zombies: Killabilly.

Juliet battles Killabilly and is contacted by the ghost of Morikawa, who gives her advice. Juliet enters the mouth of Killabilly and lands in the demon's stomach, where, in his heart, she finds Swan's headless corpse. She learns she must put Nick's head on top of Swan's body to destroy Killabilly, and tearfully does so after the couple expresses their love for each other. Killabilly explodes, and in a near-death experience, Nick learns from Morikawa's ghost that it has been decided his selfless sacrifice grants him new life, with a new body. Nick is resurrected in Morikawa's body. Together, Nick and the Starling family make their way home in return for Juliet's birthday. Should the player save all available classmates during the course of the game, Juliet's birthday will go swimmingly. If the player allows one or more classmates to die, however, Juliet's mother will be revealed to have been zombified.

== Development and release ==
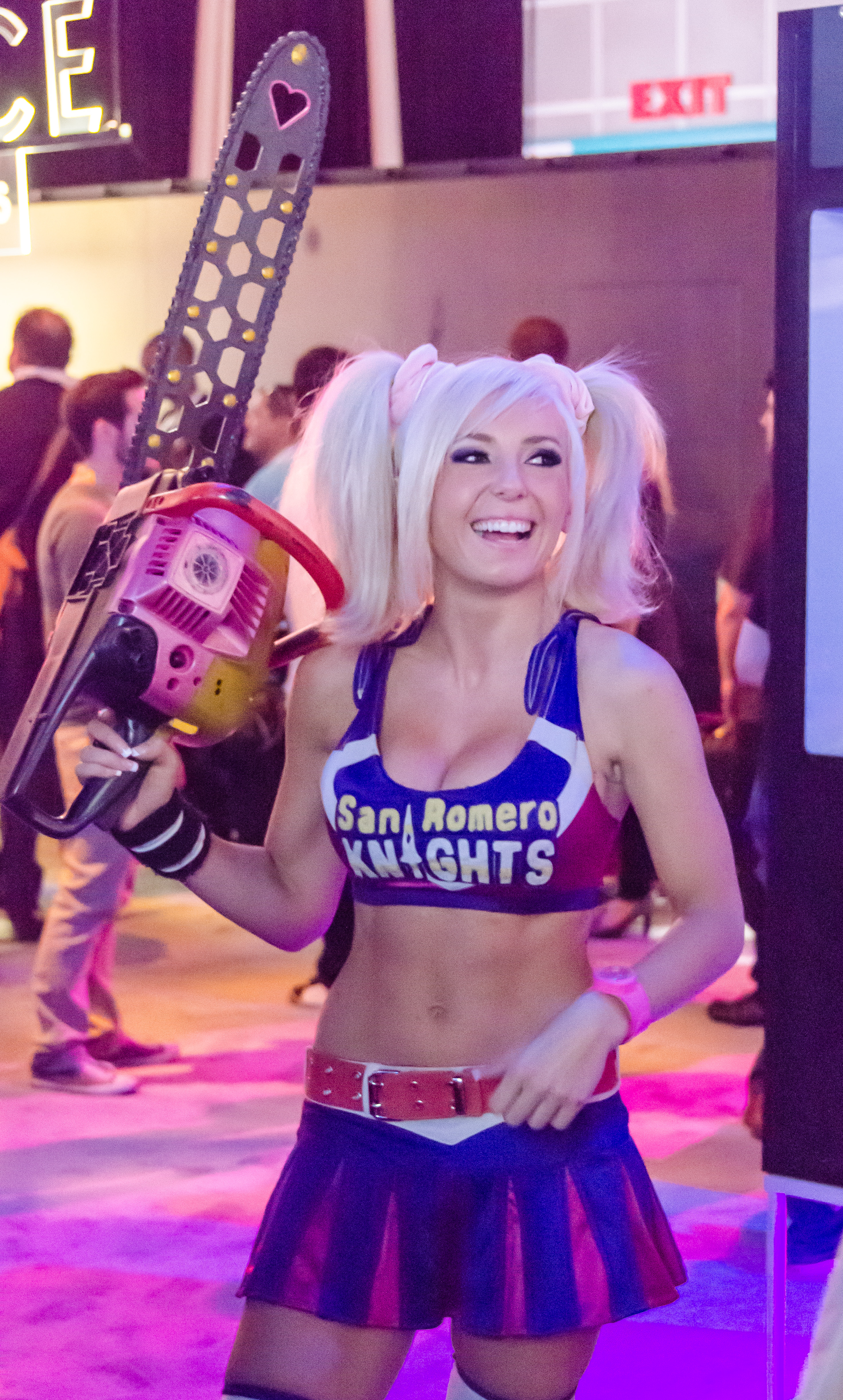
Cosplay model Jessica Nigri (pictured at E3 2012) dressed as Juliet Starling during the game's marketing campaign

Before its announcement in July 2011, Lollipop Chainsaw was first mentioned as an unnamed game featuring "stylish action" in an October 2010 article on 1UP.com detailing Kadokawa Shoten's partnership with Grasshopper and Prope. Suda described it as featuring "really extreme twists" and being very funny. He declared that he thinks the game will be "a really big title in the worldwide market." Warner Bros. Interactive Entertainment published the game outside Japan and filmmaker James Gunn had a hand in developing the game's story and characters. Gunn said that many of the people that worked with him in his films and other projects also worked on Lollipop Chainsaw.

For the characters, the illustrator "NekoshowguN" (known for her previous works on music games GuitarFreaks and DrumMania) designed the characters for Lollipop Chainsaw and the chainsaw that Juliet Starling uses. On February 1, 2012, it was announced that Jimmy Urine from the electro-punk band Mindless Self Indulgence would compose the music for the boss segments. He also provided the voice for Zed, a punk-rock themed boss. On March 6, 2012, it was announced that one of the DLC available for the game will consist of different costumes for Juliet based on five different characters from four anime series: Rei Miyamoto and Saeko Busujima from Highschool of the Dead, Shiro from Deadman Wonderland, Manyū Chifusa from Manyū Hiken-chō and Haruna from Is This a Zombie?. These costumes can also be bought in the in-game shop.

A special Lollipop Chainsaw Valentine Edition was released for Valentine's Day on February 14, 2013, in Japan. The re-release features additional content, including a "perfect unlock code", limited edition sleeve, and two bonus DVDs. The Happy Valentine Disc has PC items such as a desktop clock, wallpapers and a library of trailers; the Premium Movie Disc contains in-game movies and a Valentine's Day comic.

== Reception ==
Reception

Aggregate score
Aggregator	Score	
Aggregator	PS3	Xbox 360
Metacritic	67/100	70/100

Review scores
Publication	Score	
Publication	PS3	Xbox 360
1Up.com	N/A	C−
Destructoid	N/A	9/10
Edge	7/10	N/A
Electronic Gaming Monthly	N/A	6.5/10
Eurogamer	6/10	N/A
Game Informer	7.5/10	7.5/10
GameRevolution	N/A	4/5
GameSpot	6.5/10	6.5/10
GameTrailers	N/A	6.5/10
GameZone	N/A	9/10
IGN	5/10	5/10
Joystiq	N/A	3/5
Official Xbox Magazine (US)	N/A	6.5/10
Polygon	N/A	6.5/10
PlayStation: The Official Magazine	6/10	N/A
The Daily Telegraph	N/A	3.5/5
Digital Spy	N/A	3/5

=== Critical reception ===
The game received "mixed or average" reviews from critics, according to the review aggregator website Metacritic. Japanese magazines Famitsu and Dengeki PlayStation gave positive reviews of the game.

IGN praised the look and feel of the game, but criticized its gameplay, calling it "Bland, slow, and unsatisfying." Game Informer said, "The premise is exciting and imaginative, but the gameplay execution has too many holes to embrace completely." GameSpot praised the game's jokes, gameplay excursions and boss battles, but criticized its crudeness, control and camera quirks and combat. Destructoid praised the combat of the Xbox 360 version, calling it "intuitive, solid, and made to raise a smile". James Stephanie Sterling, reviews-editor for Destructoid and the reviewer for said console version, named it as one of their favorite games of 2012. 1UP.com called the game "empty and image-focused". GameZone called the same console version "one of the most unique experiences I've ever got my hands on" and praised its combat, but criticized the camera, commenting that it's "obstructing the action when by a wall, and it would take a few seconds to recover and let me see the action again".

The Daily Telegraph called the Xbox 360 version "Erratic, smart, puerile, limited but never less than a lot of fun, Lollipop Chainsaw is something of an endearing mess. Too often its satirical tone can run into trouble, and Grasshopper's hyperactive approach to game design can infuriate as much as it impresses. But Lollipop Chainsaw's quirky edge and strong writing carries it through those shakier moments..." 411Mania reviewed the PlayStation 3 version, saying, "It's a shame that there isn't a lot of steak to go along with the tremendous sizzle of Lollipop Chainsaw. The opening cutscene is fantastic, doing a great job of introducing you to the world of Lollipop Chainsaw and making you laugh. The world is so creative and fun to be in that it's really unfortunate the gameplay is so mediocre. If you were to rate this game based on the combat alone this game would be rather terrible, but it's everything else in Lollipop Chainsaw that makes it a passable experience and worth checking out."

Digital Spy called it "silly, short-lived fun that won't appeal to everybody, but shouldn't fail to leave a lasting impression on players who stick with it to the end." The Escapist said that, "While it's difficult to ignore the surface appeal of an oddball title like Lollipop Chainsaw, what are merely workable mechanics and some overused humor can't keep the experience afloat." However, The Digital Fix said that "While Lollipop Chainsaw could be seen as a tongue-in-cheek commentary on American hedonism, it arguably goes well past parody into the realm of uncomfortable skin-fest. Even worse, for all its excess it is just plain boring."

=== Sales ===
Lollipop Chainsaw is Grasshopper Manufacture's most successful video game to date, having sold over 1 million units by March 2014. By June 2024, it had sold over 1.24 million units. The RePOP version sold over 100,000 copies in one week of release and would go on to sell over 260,000 copies by July 2025, at which point a new game and anime adaptation based on the IP were confirmed. As of June 2026, RePOP had sold over 400,000 units.

== Legacy ==
James Gunn later drew influence from Lollipop Chainsaw when he directed The Suicide Squad (2021). It inspired "Harley-vision" where gory murders are depicted through Harley Quinn's "starry-eyed way of looking at life" by mixing "hearts and beautiful little things" with the blood that is coming out of the people Harley is killing.

=== Remaster ===
In July 2022, Kadokawa Games' successor Dragami Games announced a remake of Lollipop Chainsaw was scheduled to release in 2023. However, plans were changed to simply remaster the game instead based on player request, according to company president Yoshimi Yasuda. Both Gunn and Suda51 stated that they were not involved with the project. The remaster titled Lollipop Chainsaw RePOP was later delayed to 2024. In June 2024, Dragami announced that the game would release for Nintendo Switch, PlayStation 5, Windows, and Xbox Series X/S on September 25. The release date was then changed to September 12 in Europe and North America. PlayStation 4 and Xbox One versions were released on December 2. Like the original game, the remaster received "mixed or average" reviews from critics, according to review aggregator website Metacritic.

=== Sequel ===
A new video game was announced on July 24, 2025. On September 16, 2026, a sequel titled Lollipop Chainsaw 2 Back2Back was announced for the PlayStation 5, planned for release in 2027.

=== Anime and live-action film adaptations ===
Alongside the announcement of a new game, an anime adaptation of the original game was announced. In September 2026, a live-action feature film was announced to be in development alongside an animated series.
