= Evening Wear/Mark David Chapman =

Single by Mindless Self Indulgence

from the album If
- Released: January 20, 2009
- Recorded: 2008
- Genre: Electropunk
- Length: 2:33 (Evening Wear); 3:14 (Mark David Chapman)
- Label: The End
- Songwriter: J. Euringer
- Producers: Urine, Galus, Righ?

Mindless Self Indulgence singles chronology
"On It" (2008)	"Evening Wear/Mark David Chapman" (2009)	"It Gets Worse" (2013)

"Evening Wear" and "Mark David Chapman" are songs by Mindless Self Indulgence, released as a double A-side single on January 19, 2009 in the UK and January 20, 2009 in North America. This single includes the video for "Mark David Chapman" in four different formats, directed by Mike Dahlquist, and the previously unreleased song, "Written in Cold Blood". "Evening Wear/Mark David Chapman" peaked at number 2 on the Billboard Hot 100 Singles Sales chart and number 1 on the Hot Dance Singles Sales chart.

== Track listing ==
All songs written by J. Euringer

1. "Evening Wear" (radio edit) – 3:33
2. "Written in Cold Blood" – 2:33
3. "Mark David Chapman" (radio edit) – 3:14

=== Bonus content ===
- "Mark David Chapman" (Large QuickTime video)
- "Mark David Chapman" (Medium QuickTime video)
- "Mark David Chapman" (iPhone video)
- "Mark David Chapman" (iPod video)
