= If (Mindless Self Indulgence album) =

Studio album by Mindless Self Indulgence
- Released: April 29, 2008
- Recorded: November–December 2007
- Genre: Synth-punk, industrial rock
- Length: 45:02 (Explicit); 47:57 (Clean); 73:56 (UK)
- Label: The End
- Producer: James Galus; Jimmy Urine; Steve, Righ?

Mindless Self Indulgence chronology
| Another Mindless Rip Off (2006) | If (2008) | <3 (2010) |

Mindless Self Indulgence studio chronology
| You'll Rebel to Anything (2005) | If (2008) | How I Learned to Stop Giving a Shit and Love Mindless Self Indulgence (2013) |

Singles from If
- 1. "Mastermind" Released: February 12, 2008; 2. "Never Wanted to Dance" Released: March 18, 2008; 3. "Pay for It" Released: July 8, 2008; 4. "(It's 3AM) Issues" Released: July 8, 2008; 5. "On It" Released: July 8, 2008; 6. "Evening Wear/Mark David Chapman" Released: January 20, 2009

Alternative covers
- Deluxe digipak edition

Alternative cover
- Vinyl edition

Alternative cover
- Japanese edition

Alternative cover

Professional ratings
Review scores
| Source | Rating |
|---|---|
| AbsolutePunk.net | 68% |
| AllMusic | 3/5 stars |
| Entertainment Weekly | B+ |
| Kerrang! | 4/5 stars |
| Metal Hammer | 4/5 stars |
| Rock Sound | 4/5 stars |

If is the fifth studio album by American industrial rock band Mindless Self Indulgence. It was released through The End Records on April 29, 2008 in the UK and on April 29, 2008 in the U.S. The album debuted on the US Billboard 200 at #27. A digital deluxe version was released in on April 1, 2010, which includes 7 B-side tracks, 5 remixes of the track "On It", 4 remixes of the track "Issues", 2 remixes of the track "Pay For It", and 4 remixes of the track "Never Wanted to Dance". An accompanying EP titled <3 was released on August 10, 2010.

== Track listing ==
All tracks are written by James Euringer except where otherwise noted.

| No. | Title | Writer(s) | Length |
|---|---|---|---|
| 1. | "Never Wanted to Dance" | | 3:09 |
| 2. | "Evening Wear" | | 3:32 |
| 3. | "Lights Out" | Euringer and Montano | 2:37 |
| 4. | "Prescription" | | 3:06 |
| 5. | "Issues" | Euringer, Montano, and Dunn | 3:05 |
| 6. | "Get It Up" | Euringer and Montano | 2:36 |
| 7. | "Revenge" | | 3:09 |
| 8. | "Animal" | | 2:44 |
| 9. | "Mastermind" | | 3:00 |
| 10. | "On It" | | 3:02 |
| 11. | "Pay For It" | | 3:34 |
| 12. | "Due" | | 2:10 |
| 13. | "Money" | | 2:53 |
| 14. | "Bomb This Track" | | 3:20 |
| 15. | "Mark David Chapman" | | 3:10 |
| Total length: | | | 45:10 |

=== UK/Japanese edition bonus tracks ===
| No. | Title | Length |
|---|---|---|
| 16. | "Uncle" | 2:55 |
| 17. | "3S" | 2:27 |
| 18. | "Never Wanted to Dance (The Birthday Massacre "Pansy Mix")" | 3:31 |
| 19. | "Never Wanted to Dance (Combichrist Electro Hurtz Mix)" | 4:52 |
| 20. | "Never Wanted to Dance (Tommie Sunshine [TSMV] Remix)" | 7:13 |
| 21. | "Never Wanted to Dance (Spider "Dub" Mix)" | 7:52 |
| Total length: | | 1:14:10 |

=== Japanese edition bonus disc ===
| No. | Title | Length |
|---|---|---|
| 1. | "Written in Cold Blood (Mark Saunders Mix)" | 2:33 |
| 2. | "Prove Me Wrong" | 4:04 |
| 3. | "Genius" | 2:29 |
| 4. | "On It (Remix by KMFDM)" | 3:33 |
| 5. | "On It (Remix by Hollowboy)" | 4:33 |
| 6. | "(It's 3AM) Issues (Remix by Dinesh Boaz)" | 3:11 |
| 7. | "(It's 3AM) Issues (Remix by Million Dollar Mano)" | 3:20 |
| 8. | "Pay for It (Remix by M. Shawn Crahan, Clown from Slipknot/Dirty Little Rabbits)" | 4:05 |
| 9. | "Pay for It (Remix by Ulver)" | 3:47 |
| 10. | "Never Wanted to Dance (Ulrich Wild Remix)" | 3:13 |
| 11. | "Never Wanted to Dance (a cappella mix by The Birthday Massacre)" | 2:37 |
| Total length: | | 37:35 |

=== Japanese edition bonus videos ===
1. "Never Wanted to Dance" (Directed by Jim Berman)
2. "Mark David Chapman" (Directed by Mike Dahlquist)
3. The Making of "Mark David Chapman" (shot, cut, directed and narrated by Mike Dahlquist)

=== Deluxe edition bonus DVD contents ===
1. "Stupid MF" (live)
2. "Straight to Video" (live)
3. "Animal" (live)
4. "Tornado" (live)
5. "Animal" (music video)

=== <3 ===
All tracks are written by James Euringer except where otherwise noted.

| No. | Title | Length |
|---|---|---|
| 1. | "3 S'" | 2:31 |
| 2. | "Make Me Cum (Demo)" | 2:50 |
| 3. | "Greatest Love of All (Demo)" | 2:48 |
| 4. | "Prove Me Wrong" | 4:04 |
| 5. | "My World (Demo)" | 2:50 |
| 6. | "Genius" | 2:29 |
| 7. | "Uncle" | 2:55 |
| 8. | "Written in Cold Blood" | 2:34 |
| Total length: | | 26:25 |

== Album cover ==
The cover for the album features the word "If" written in black ink on crinkled white paper. The "F" in "If" has a splatter of red ink coming out of the bottom. The deluxe digipak features a hand with the word "If" written on it in glowing pink text, with each of the band members as a finger puppet. The vinyl edition features a drawing of the band riding fly-like creatures.

The album cover for "<3" (an emoticon for a heart), features the title written in white atop crinkled red paper. The "3" has a splatter of white ink coming out of the bottom.

== Personnel ==
- Jimmy Urine - vocals, art direction, producer, programming, arranger, lyrics
- Kitty - drums, art direction, lyrics
- Steve, Righ? - guitar, additional producer, arranger, lyrics
- Lyn-Z - bass
- James Galus - producer, arranger, logo, art direction, artwork
- Jordan Haley - photography
- Shuntaro Kato - photography
- Becky Coppelia Yee - photography
- Greg Reely - mixing
- Rhys Fulber - mixing
- Will Quinnel - mastering

== Charts ==
| Chart (2008) | Peak position |
|---|---|
| US Billboard 200 | 27 |
