= Juliet Starling =

Fictional character

- First game: Lollipop Chainsaw (2012)
- Voiced by: English: Tara Strong; Japanese: Yoko Hikasa; Eri Kitamura; Yukari Tamura

In-universe information
- Nationality: American

Juliet Starling (Japanese: ジュリエット・スターリング, Hepburn: Jurietto Sutāringu) is a video game character introduced in 2012's action-adventure game Lollipop Chainsaw, developed by Japanese company Grasshopper Manufacture. The character is designed as a teen high school cheerleader who hunts zombies with a chainsaw and carries a lollipop.

The character has been regarded as controversial because of her portrayal in the game, with some critics describing it as sexist, while others emphasize her sexual objectification, often interpreting her characterization centered around the male gaze.

== Concept and design ==
Game producer Yoshimi Yasuda stated that the initial concept of Juliet in Lollipop Chainsaw remained largely consistent with its final version. The premise of a cheerleader combating zombies with a chainsaw and firearm was refined during development, with the shotgun element ultimately replaced by a chainsaw equipped with a grenade launcher attachment. To avoid an overemphasis on graphic violence, Yasuda directed the development team to incorporate colorful and stylized elements, such as rainbows and hearts, in order to create a contrasting "kawaii" aesthetic.

The design of Juliet was shaped by this emphasis on contrast. Conceived as a character intended to appeal broadly to players, her appearance and behavior were made purposefully "cute" and youthful, while her role as a zombie hunter shows her capability for violence. This difference between innocence and brutality constitutes a central thematic element of the game. Another major part of her design is a lollipop, by which she can upgrade herself through sucking it. For her portrayal, actresses given voice include Tara Strong in English, Yoko Hikasa, Eri Kitamura and Yukari Tamura in Japanese.

In the remaster of the original game, Lollipop Chainsaw RePOP, players are given various customizable options to dress up Juliet in hundreds of different ways.

== Appearances ==
In Lollipop Chainsaw, Juliet is portrayed as an 18-year-old high school student. At the beginning of the game, she is shown readying to celebrate her 18th birthday and present her boyfriend Nick to her family, before a zombie outbreak reveals her identity as belonging to a family of zombie hunters. In response to Nick being bitten by a zombie, Juliet decapitates him and uses a ritual to preserve his consciousness, after which he accompanies her as a disembodied head. The game's main villain is Swan, responsible for the zombie apocalypse, whom Juliet eventually managed to defeat after overcoming a wide range of opponents.

Apart from Lollipop Chainsaw, Juliet also made an appearance in Killer Is Dead. In September 2013, toy company World Scope designed a 1/8 scale action figure for Juliet, with the figure costing around 6,460 yen or 65 dollars. In April 2026, coinciding with the Korean release of Lollipop Chainsaw RePOP, it was revealed that the players would receive an acrylic figure of Juliet on May 24 as the game's pre-order bonus.

== Critical reception ==
According to an author from Digitally Downloaded, Juliet's depiction in Lollipop Chainsaw made people debate, especially regarding the treatment of gender and sexuality, with some labeling it sexist while others interpreting it as a critique of sexualized tropes in video games; the author argued that the latter better mirrors what the game intended for. Although its marketing emphasized exploitative imagery to attract a mass audience, the game itself presents a more radical portrayal through Juliet. The game story depicts Juliet as both intellectually capable and physically dominant, contrasting her outward cheerleader stereotype with demonstrated competence in combat, multilingual ability, and emotional composure. Throughout the game, male characters, including her disembodied partner Nick, are portrayed as dependent, immature, or driven by crude behavior, which Juliet largely ignores, positioning her as detached from and superior to such conduct. Gameplay elements further reinforce this tone; for example, a trophy awarded for attempting to view up her skirt functions less as a reward than as a form of player-directed satire, while her revealing alternate costumes gains attention and arguably parodies expectations of sexualization. Comparisons have also been made with titles such as Onechanbara, which critics cite as a more straightforward example of sexploitation. Jon Denton from Eurogamer additionally examined this topic thoroughly.

James Stephanie Sterling of Destructoid argues that, despite the overt sexualization of Juliet, the game utilizes a deliberate reversal of traditional gender roles to critique ideas of objectification and gender dynamics. While Juliet is made appealing for the male gaze through revealing outfits and suggestive camera angles, Sterling contends that this surface-level objectification is connected with the mistreatment of Nick, who is transformed into a disembodied head early in the narrative and subsequently rendered powerless and functions largely as an object carried by Juliet, and subjected to humiliation, harassment, and disregard for his autonomy by multiple characters, including Juliet and her family. His lack of agency, combined with instances of emotional distress and pleas for release are ignored, showing themes of dehumanization.

Marlena Skall, writing for Game Developer, examines Juliet, arguing that she serves as a prime example where character design is often shaped around a presumed male audience. Skall suggests that this marks only a limited step toward improved representation, pointing to her design elements, such as short skirt, stylized school uniform, and exaggerated features, continuing familiar portrayals that some players, particularly women, may find difficult to relate to. Elements like her posed animations and the visual emphasis on her chainsaw are also interpreted as strengthening gendered conventions associated with male-oriented design. In this context, Skall presents Juliet as part of a wider discussion about representation in games, where the inclusion of a female protagonist does not necessarily equate to more substantive or varied depictions of women.

University of South Carolina scholar Bonnie Harris-Lowe cites Juliet as an example of how hypersexualized female characters are often framed for the presumed pleasure of a male player. Juliet's outfit, consisting of a sports bra and a miniskirt, provides minimal coverage. If the player attempts to adjust the camera angle to look beneath her skirt, the character initially blocks the view, and an achievement titled “I swear! I did it by mistake!” can be unlocked within seconds. However, maintaining this angle for a longer period causes the character to stop resisting, allowing the player to see her undergarments. While the delay before this occurs may be interpreted as a commentary on voyeuristic behavior, the inclusion of a reward system for such actions has been criticized for encouraging it, effectively turning the character's discomfort into a gameplay objective.

Academics Jessica E. Tompkins, Teresa Lynch, Irene I. Van Driel, and Niki Fritz observe that, although multiple costumes are available for Juliet in the game, her primary attire remains a two-piece cheerleading uniform. In the introductory sequence, she is depicted expressing enthusiasm for her boyfriend, emphasizing affection through sexually suggestive behavior. Despite Juliet's presentation as confident and commanding, her characterization is described as relying heavily on sexual objectification, with her buttocks and breasts becoming focal points in numerous cinematic sequences, particularly during interactions with her sensei. In one instance, while introducing her boyfriend, she bends over, exposing her bloomers; in another, physical comedy results in the sensei falling into her cleavage. These scenes have been interpreted as weakening her apparent dominance by constructing her as an object of visual consumption, thereby limiting her empowering potential.
