= Frankenstein Girls Will Seem Strangely Sexy =

Studio album by Mindless Self Indulgence
- Released: February 22, 2000
- Recorded: 1997 – October 1999
- Genre: Digital hardcore, industrial rock, electropunk
- Length: 55:16
- Label: Elektra; Uppity Cracker
- Producer: Urine & Galus

Mindless Self Indulgence chronology
Tight (1999)	Frankenstein Girls Will Seem Strangely Sexy (2000)	Alienating Our Audience (2002)

Mindless Self Indulgence studio chronology
Tight (1999)	Frankenstein Girls Will Seem Strangely Sexy (2000)	You'll Rebel To Anything (2005)

Singles from Frankenstein Girls Will Seem Strangely Sexy
- 1. "Bitches" Released: April 4, 2000; 2. "Planet of the Apes" Released: 2000; 3. "Bitches/Molly" Released: 2000

Frankenstein Girls Will Seem Strangely Sexy is the third studio album by American electronic rock band Mindless Self Indulgence released in 2000. This is their last studio album to feature Vanessa YT on bass guitar.

The track listing on the back cover has all the vowels (except for the I in “I Hate Jimmy Page and “I’m Your Problem Now”) replaced with asterisks, even in those words that would not generally be considered offensive. They are also listed in alphabetical order. "Bitches" was the album's sole single release and prominently featured a sample of the opening riff to the Siouxsie and the Banshees song, "Happy House." The song credits Siouxsie Sioux and Steven Severin as writing partners due to the use of the sample. A single for the track "Planet of the Apes" was released as a promotional CD only.

Promo/Advance copies of the album were unmastered and featured slightly different one letter "skit" tracks. They also feature an orchestral intro to "Holy Shit" and do not contain the live performance intro to "Backmask". The streaming version of the album available on streaming platforms is one of these promo copies, in contrast to the final CD version.

Professional ratings
Review scores
Source	Rating
AllMusic	2.5/5 stars
Rolling Stone	3/5 stars
Surf Mechanic	2.5/5 stars

== Background ==
After the release of their second album Tight, the band garnered significant interest from record labels, leading to what frontman Jimmy Urine described as a "20 label bidding war." During this period, MSI would charge record labels substantial fees for their appearances and Urine would often use the money to buy frivolous items. The band would also remaster songs to cost hundreds of thousands of dollars, a move that Elektra Records, their eventual signee, attempted to stop. Instead, MSI priced their next album, Frankenstein Girls Will Seem Strangely Sexy, at $30, put the songs in alphabetical order, and made them (excluding "I Hate Jimmy Page") less than 3 minutes long, all to purposefully irritate investors. According to Urine, "That's probably a million dollar record, and there's no way we'll ever be recouped on it. But it's great!"

The cover of the album was drawn by Jamie Hewlett, the artist known for Tank Girl and Gorillaz. Urine said in an interview "We wanted him as the artist for our 2000 release Frankenstein Girls Will Seem Strangely Sexy. We had to track him down ourselves because the label did not even begin to know how to find him. When we finally got him on board we just said draw whatever you want." Hewlett offered to make a music video for a song on the album but was rejected by Elektra.

== Track listing ==
All tracks are written by Little Jimmy Urine, except track 2, written by Little Jimmy Urine, Steven Severin and Siouxsie Sioux. Every vowel in every track's title on the back cover is replaced with an asterisk.

No.	Title	Length
1.	"Backmask" (also erroneously referred to as "Backmaskwarning!", due to misreading the liner notes)	3:01
2.	"Bitches"	2:44
3.	"Boomin'"	1:23
4.	"Clarissa"	1:57
5.	"Cocaine and Toupees"	1:52
6.	"Dicks Are for My Friends"	1:15
7.	"F"	0:13
8.	"Faggot"	2:46
9.	"Futures"	1:27
10.	"Golden I"	2:07
11.	"Harry Truman"	1:39
12.	"Holy Shit"	1:45
13.	"I Hate Jimmy Page"	3:35
14.	"I'm Your Problem Now"	1:56
15.	"J"	0:24
16.	"Keepin' Up with the Kids"	1:45
17.	"Kick the Bucket"	1:45
18.	"Kill the Rock"	2:04
19.	"Last Time I Tried to Rock Your World"	1:47
20.	"London Bridge"	1:51
21.	"M"	0:14
22.	"Masturbates"	2:50
23.	"Planet of the Apes"	2:12
24.	"Played"	2:19
25.	"Ready for Love"	2:06
26.	"Royally Fucked"	1:52
27.	"Seven-Eleven"	1:33
28.	"Step Up, Ghetto Blaster"	2:23
29.	"Whipstickagostop"	2:38
30.	"Z"	0:50
Total length:		55:16

== Artwork ==
The album's cover, drawn by Jamie Hewlett, features 3 female Frankensteins on a blue and black gradient background. The band's name is written on the top in red, and Hewlett's signature is placed in the bottom right. The physical copy also features a cartoon drawing of the band with hammers and saws, also drawn by Hewlett.

== Personnel ==
Mindless Self Indulgence

- Jimmy Urine – lead vocals, programming, samples, keyboards, production, arrangement, recording, songwriting
- Steve, Righ? – lead guitar, backing vocals, programming, keyboards, songwriting (track 29)
- Kitty – drums, programming
- Vanessa Y.T. – bass guitar, keyboards

Artwork and packaging

- James Galus – arrangement, art direction, photography
- Jim DeBarros – art direction
- Jamie Hewlett – illustrations

Production and recording

- James Galus – production, arrangement, art direction, photography
- John Deutsch – A&R
- Leigh Lust – A&R
- Lloyd Puckitt – editing, mixing
- Vaughan Merrick – editing
- Fred Maher – editing
- Gideon Kendall – illustration
- Emily Lazar – mastering
- Ashley Douglas – mastering
- Tom Hutten – mastering
- Mario Caldatto Jr. – mixing
- Bill Importico – mixing
- Jeff Pyatt – mixing
- Neil Beck – mixing
- Richard Zabala – mixing
- Robert J. Carranza – mixing
- Ryan Boesch – mixing
- Raeann Zschokke – recording
- Ray Martin – recording
- Chris Flam – recording
- Justin Guip – drum technician
