= Tight (Mindless Self Indulgence album) =

Studio album by Mindless Self Indulgence
- Released: April 20, 1999
- Recorded: 1997–1999
- Genre: Industrial rock
- Length: 31:42
- Label: Uppity Cracker
- Producers: Jimmy Urine, James Galus

Mindless Self Indulgence chronology
Crappy Little Demo (1997)	Tight (1999)	Frankenstein Girls Will Seem Strangely Sexy (2000)

Mindless Self Indulgence studio chronology
Mindless Self-Indulgence (1995)	Tight (1999)	Frankenstein Girls Will Seem Strangely Sexy (2000)

Mindless Self Indulgence chronology
<3 (2010)	Tighter (2011)	How I Learned to Stop Giving a Shit and Love Mindless Self Indulgence (2013)

Singles from Tight
- 1. "Bring The Pain" Released: 1999; 2. "Tornado" Released: 1999; 3. "Tight" Released: 1999

Professional ratings
Review scores
Source	Rating
Allmusic	3/5 stars

Tight is the second studio album by the American electropunk band Mindless Self Indulgence. The album was originally released on April 20, 1999 through Uppity Cracker Recording Group. After having been out of print for many years, the album was reissued as Tighter on April 26, 2011 through The End Records. The reissue features updated artwork and packaging, 12 previously unreleased tracks and a bonus DVD.

The song "Bring the Pain" is a cover of a Method Man song from his album Tical. The song "Bite Your Rhymes" references lyrics from Vanilla Ice's "Ice Ice Baby". There is a hidden track, "JX-47", where guitarist Steve plays acoustic guitar and sings nonsensical lyrics. The tracks "Mindless Self Indulgence" and "Ecnegludni Fles Sseldnim" are messages from the band's answering machine. They both concern getting the band booked for a live show, but both times the caller (Octavio 9) couldn't remember the band's name.

The album was preceded by a promotional demo recording titled Crappy Little Demo, released in 1997. The album featured two demo recordings for Tight, three demo recordings for their next album Frankenstein Girls Will Seem Strangely Sexy, a track titled "Panty Shot" and a track titled "Niggers", which was a rip of the Lenny Bruce comedy routine "Hard Words".

On April 20, 2008, the band posted Tight, in its entirety, on their MySpace page in honor of the ninth anniversary of its the original release.

== Track listing ==
All tracks are written by Jimmy Urine, except where noted.

Original release (1999)
No.	Title	Writer(s)	Length
1.	"Grab the Mic"		1:20
2.	"Bring the Pain" (Method Man cover)	Robert Diggs, Clifford Smith, Urine	3:39
3.	"Mindless Self Indulgence"		0:22
4.	"Tight"		2:47
5.	"Diabolical"		1:43
6.	"Molly"		1:44
7.	"Tornado"	Lana Moorer, Parish Smith, Urine	1:51
8.	"Daddy"		1:20
9.	"Pussy All Night"		2:21
10.	"Apple Country"	Steve, Righ?	1:07
11.	"Dickface"		2:07
12.	"Bite Your Rhymes"		2:38
13.	"Hail Satan" (live recording of "Tornado" at CBGB on May 23, 1998)		1:57
14.	"Ecnegludni Fles Sseldnim" (contains the hidden track "JX-47")		6:47
Total length:			31:42

Tighter reissue bonus tracks (2011)
No.	Title	Writer(s)	Length
14.	"Ecnegludni Fles Sseldnim"		0:17
15.	"JX-47"		3:35
16.	"Shnooze"		0:09
17.	"Cake"		1:25
18.	"I Hate Everyone"		1:03
19.	"If I Only Didn't Want to F the Ones Who Didnt Want to F Me"		1:39
20.	"Agents"		0:18
21.	"Bring the Pain" (new wave version)	Diggs, C. Smith, Urine	4:15
22.	"Tornado" (cassingle version)	Moorer, P. Smith, Urine	2:17
23.	"This Isn't Good"		1:57
24.	"Dickface" (demo)		1:56
25.	"Tight" (8-bit)		2:40
26.	"I Think I Turned 22"		1:23
27.	"Free as a Birdie"		1:38
Total length:			49:28

All tracks are written by Jimmy Urine, except where noted.

Crappy Little Demo track listing (1997)
No.	Title	Writer(s)	Length
1.	"Bitches"		2:41
2.	"Bring the Pain" (Method Man cover)	Robert Diggs, Clifford Smith, Urine	3:58
3.	"Faggot"		2:49
4.	"Tornado"	Lana Moorer, Parish Smith, Urine	2:21
5.	"Royally Fucked"		1:55
6.	"Panty Shot"		2:59
7.	"Niggers"	Lenny Bruce	1:49
Total length:			18:32

Bonus DVD track listing

1. "Bring the Pain" (Paramount Theatre – Seattle, WA 06/17/99)
2. "Bring the Pain" (Backstage @ Paramount Theatre – Seattle, WA 06/17/99)
3. "Daddy" (Squeezebox – New York, NY 02/06/98)
4. "Daddy" (Rehearsal – New York, NY 09/29/99)
5. "Diabolical" (Shrine Auditorium – Los Angeles, CA 06/23/99)
6. "Dickface" (Bowery – New York, NY 09/07/99)
7. "Dickface" (Brownies – New York, NY 01/20/99)
8. "Grab the Mic" (Coney Island High – New York, NY 10/02/98)
9. "Grab the Mic" (Subculture – Grand Rapids, MI 06/09/99)
10. "Grab the Mic" (The Frying Pan – New York, NY 03/21/97)
11. "Grab the Mic" (Virgin Megastore – New York, NY 04/20/99)
12. "Molly" (Coney Island High – New York, NY 10/02/98)
13. "Molly" (Fillmore Auditorium – Denver, CO 06/14/99)
14. "Pussy All Night" (Brownies – New York, NY 01/20/99)
15. "Pussy All Night" (CBGB's – New York, NY 11/11/99)
16. "Pussy All Night" (Maritime Hall – San Francisco, CA 06/20/99)
17. "Pussy All Night" (Shrine Auditorium – Los Angeles, CA 06/23/99)
18. "Tight" (Fort Wayne Coliseum – Fort Wayne, IN 07/15/99)
19. "Tight" (Maritime Hall – San Francisco, CA 06/20/99)
20. "Tight" (Subculture – Grand Rapids, MI 06/09/99)
21. "Tight" (Paramount Theatre – Seattle, WA 06/17/99)
22. "Tight" (Virgin Megastore – New York, NY 04/20/99)
23. "Tornado" (Fort Wayne Coliseum – Fort Wayne, IN 07/15/99)

Extras

1. MSI Sux
2. We Hate You 2
3. Audio commentary

== Personnel ==
Album personnel as adapted from the Allmusic entry for Tighter.

Mindless Self Indulgence

- Jimmy Urine – vocals, programming
- Steve, Righ? – guitars
- Kitty – drums
- Vanessa Y.T. – bass

Artwork and packaging

- Jennifer Dunn – layout, photography
- Billy French – layout
- James Galus – art direction, package design, photography
- Chris Greer – authoring
- Jorden Haley – logo
- Scott Marchfeld – authoring
- Stephanie Rauber – photography
- Jimmy Urine – art direction, package design

Production and recording

- Neil Beck – assistant engineer
- Dan the Man – assistant engineer
- James Galus – A&R, arranger, producer
- Ben Grassini – assistant engineer
- Andreas Katsambas – A&R
- Fred Mahr – engineer, mixing
- John Partham – engineer
- Lloyd Puckitt – engineer, mixing
- Marke Reed – compilation, editing
- Greg Reely – mastering, mixing
- Steve Revitte – assistant engineer
- Jimmy Urine – arranger, compilation, editing, engineer, mixing, producer
- Richard Zabala – assistant engineer
