= You'll Rebel to Anything =

Studio album by Mindless Self Indulgence
- Released: April 12, 2005
- Recorded: June–December 2004
- Genre: Industrial rock, digital hardcore, electro-industrial
- Length: 26:25
- Label: Metropolis
- Producer: James Euringer, James Galus, Machine

Mindless Self Indulgence chronology
Despierta Los Niños (2003)	You'll Rebel to Anything (2005)	Another Mindless Rip Off (2006)

Mindless Self Indulgence studio chronology
Frankenstein Girls Will Seem Strangely Sexy (2000)	You'll Rebel to Anything (2005)	If (2008)

Singles from You'll Rebel to Anything
- 1. "Straight to Video" Released: March 7, 2006; 2. "Shut Me Up" Released: September 12, 2006

お前は何にでも反発する (難問じゃない限り)

Professional ratings
Review scores
Source	Rating
AllMusic	4/5 stars
Alternative Press	4/5 stars
Kerrang!	4/5 stars
Rock Sound	7/10
Sputnikmusic	3.5/5 stars

You'll Rebel to Anything is the fourth studio album by New York City band Mindless Self Indulgence. The album was released on April 12, 2005. The album was released outside of the US on November 5, 2007, in an "Expanded and Remastered" edition. On January 22, 2008, the "Expanded and Remastered" version, which features a reordered track list, was released in the US. Another variation of the Expanded and Remastered version was released which included four bonus tracks. The Expanded and Remastered version, both with and without bonus tracks, as well as the clean version of the album, can be streamed digitally. The original version of the album is not available on streaming. A special Japanese version, titled お前は何にでも反発する (難問じゃない限り) [You'll Rebel to Anything (As Long as It's Not Challenging)] of the remastered edition was released on March 5, 2008, which includes a slightly reordered track list and 10 bonus tracks, including a demo version of "Bomb This Track", the completed version of which can be found on If. An alternate version of the album was released on vinyl in 2017, then again in 2022, and again in 2025, featuring the original track list along with four different bonus tracks.

This album resulted in many firsts for the band: it was their first studio album to feature Lyn-Z on bass, first studio album to have alternate versions, first studio album to reach the Billboard, first studio album to be released outside of the US, first studio album in which clean versions of all the tracks were released to retail, and their first studio album to have music videos based on tracks besides those excerpted from live shows.

An accompanying EP titled Another Mindless Rip-Off was released on December 5, 2006.

== Cover ==
The cover on the album is a blue cross made up of many video game controllers and systems, including the GameCube, PlayStation, PlayStation 2, Xbox, Atari 2600, Nintendo Entertainment System, Super NES, Genesis, and the Power Glove. The band's name is written on the bottom in dark grey text. The cover for the Japanese version is a parody of the cover art on Another Mindless Rip Off. The cover for the reissued version features a black man dressed like Jesus, in front of a gate. Around the edges are several flowers. The band's name is written around the man's hair.

== Track listing ==
All tracks are written by James Euringer except where otherwise noted.

No.	Title	Writer(s)	Length
1.	"Shut Me Up"		2:48
2.	"1989"		1:57
3.	"Straight to Video"		3:44
4.	"Tom Sawyer"	Rush	2:24
5.	"You'll Rebel to Anything (As Long as It's Not Challenging)"		2:32
6.	"What Do They Know?"		3:08
7.	"Stupid MF"		2:25
8.	"2 Hookers and an Eightball"		2:17
9.	"Prom"		2:29
10.	"Bullshit"		2:41
Total length:			26:25

Amended version bonus track
No.	Title	Writer(s)	Length
11.	"Mic Commander"	James Euringer	2:04
Total length:			28:29

All tracks are written by James Euringer except where otherwise noted.

Expanded and Remastered
No.	Title	Writer(s)	Length
1.	"Shut Me Up"		2:48
2.	"Stupid MF"		2:24
3.	"Straight To Video"		3:43
4.	"What Do They Know?"		3:08
5.	"2 Hookers And An 8 Ball"		2:17
6.	"Prom"		2:28
7.	"Bullshit"		2:41
8.	"Tom Sawyer"	Rush	2:24
9.	"1989"		1:58
10.	"You'll Rebel To Anything"		2:32
Total length:			26:28

All tracks are written by James Euringer except where otherwise noted.

Expanded and Remastered bonus tracks
No.	Title	Writer(s)	Length
11.	"Mic Commander (Dirty Version)"		2:05
12.	"La-Di Da-Di"	Douglas Davis, Richard Walters	3:49
13.	"Make Me Cum"		2:50
14.	"Wack! (live recording from Webster Hall, NYC July 2005; original version on Despierta Los Niños)"		2:34
Total length:			37:46

All tracks are written by James Euringer except where otherwise noted.

Japanese release bonus tracks
No.	Title	Writer(s)	Length
11.	"Mic Commander (Dirty Version)"		2:04
12.	"Bomb This Track (Original Demo)"		3:21
13.	"Frying Pan (Original Demo)"		2:48
14.	"La-Di Da-Di"	Douglas Davis, Richard Walters	3:49
15.	"Shut Me Up (1200XL Mix)"		5:41
16.	"Shut Me Up (Groandome Metal Mix)"		2:56
17.	"Straight To Video (Burnout Revenge Mix)"		5:20
18.	"Straight To Video (Mix According To Combichrist)"		4:55
19.	"What Do They Know? (Hollowboy Extended Pleasure Mix)"		5:22
20.	"What Do They Know? (Backstabber's Delight Mix)"		4:37
Total length:			65:17

All tracks are written by James Euringer except where otherwise noted.

2017/2022/2025 Vinyl Reissue
No.	Title	Writer(s)	Length
11.	"La-Di-Da-Di"	Douglas Davis, Richard Walters	3:46
12.	"Disappoint"		2:25
13.	"Rip-Off"		1:56
14.	"You Will See Just What I See"		2:55

All tracks are written by James Euringer except where otherwise noted.

Another Mindless Rip-Off
No.	Title	Length
1.	"My World"	3:20
2.	"Pre-Teen Violence"	3:16
3.	"Frying Pan"	2:49
4.	"Lush"	2:38
5.	"Born to Be Beheaded"	2:15
6.	"What Do They Know? (Mindless Self Indulgence Vs. Julien-K & Chester Bennington Remix)"	5:29
7.	"What Do They Know? (Backstabber's Delight Mix)"	4:39
8.	"What Do They Know? (Hollowboy Extended Pleasure Mix)"	5:25
9.	"What Do They Know? (Maelstrom Mix)"	5:44
10.	"What Do They Know? (The Final Word Mix)"	2:26
Total length:		38:01

== Music videos ==
- "You'll Rebel to Anything" (directed by Alexander Serpico)
- "Shut Me Up" (directed by Jhonen Vasquez)
- "Straight to Video" (directed by Poz Lang)
- "Molly" (on the Expanded/Remastered Version)

== Personnel ==
- James "Little Jimmy Urine" Euringer – vocals, lyrics, producer, arranger, recording, programming, songwriting
- Steven "Steve, Righ?" Montano – guitar, backup vocals
- Lindsey Ann "Lyn-Z" Way – bass guitar
- Jennifer "Kitty" Dunn – drums
- Kenny Muhammad The Human Orchestra – beatboxing on "La-Di-Da-Di"
- James Galus – producer, arranger, art direction
- Gene Freeman – additional producer, engineering, mixing
- Sal Mormando – engineering
- Will Quinnell – mastering
- Clinton Bradley – additional sound design & effects
- Gary Baker – pro-tools technician
- Jordan Haley – artwork, layout, photography
- Eugene "Machine" Freeman – mixing, additional production, engineer, recording
- JC Charvet – pro-tools technician
- Rush – songwriting (track 4)

== Charts ==
Chart (2005)	Peak position
US Billboard 200	107
