= Jimmy Urine =

American singer

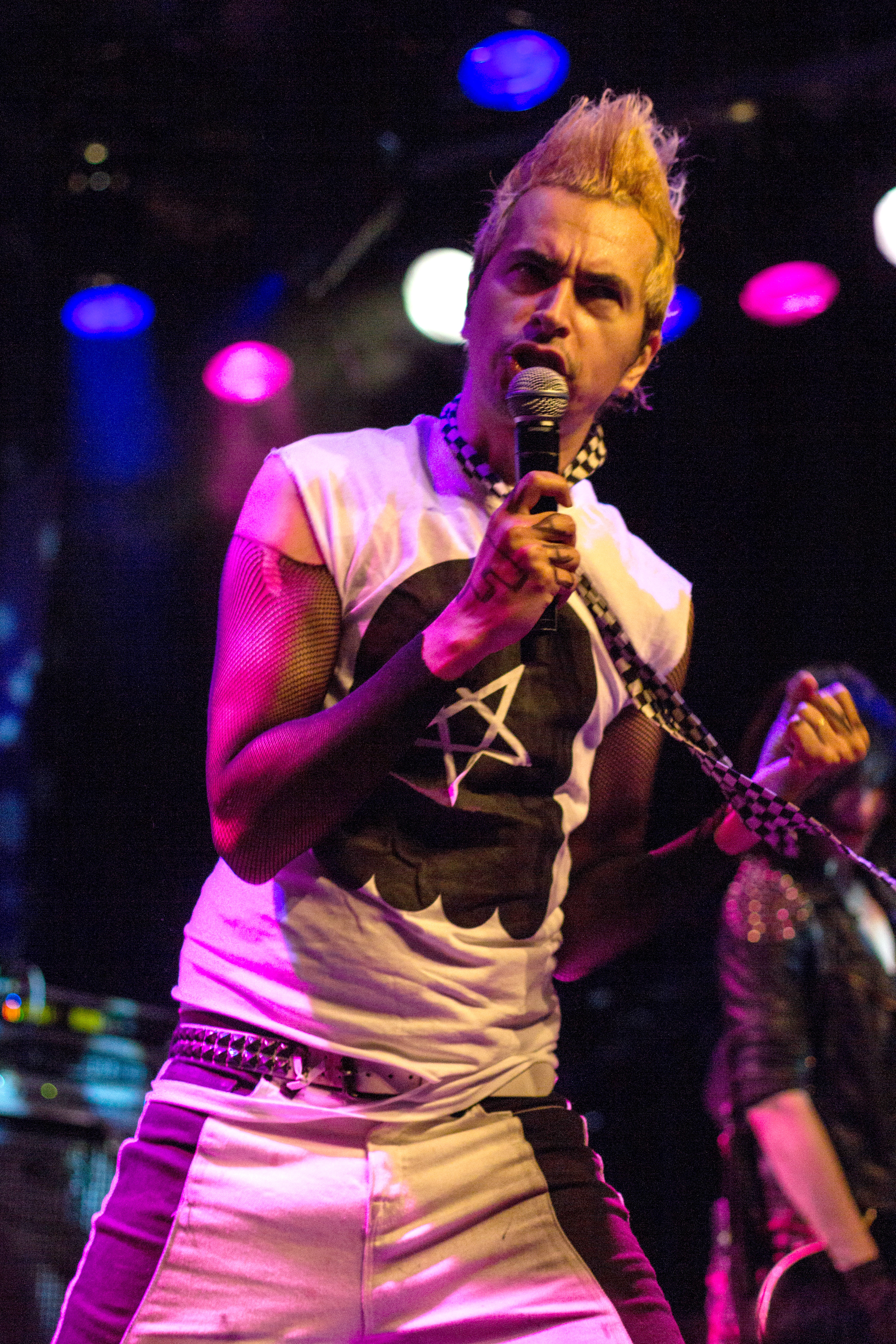
- Urine performing in December 2013

Background information
- Born: James Euringer; September 7, 1969 (age 57); New York City, U.S.
- Genres: Electropunk; industrial rock; electronic rock
- Occupations: Musician; singer; songwriter
- Instruments: Vocals; synthesizers
- Years active: 1987–2021
- Formerly of: Mindless Self Indulgence; The Left Rights; Euringer
- Spouse: Chantal Claret (m. 2008)

James Euringer (born September 7, 1969), better known as Jimmy Urine, is an American musician. He is best known as the lead singer and primary songwriter of the electropunk band Mindless Self Indulgence, which he co-founded in 1997.

== Early life ==
James Euringer was born in New York City on September 7, 1969. He has a brother. He graduated from a Catholic school and attended an art school, but dropped out.

== Career ==
=== Mindless Self Indulgence ===
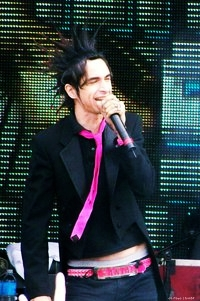
Urine performing in May 2007

Before starting Mindless Self Indulgence in 1997, Euringer took on the stage name "Jimmy Urine" and worked with his brother Markus, releasing an album titled Mindless Self-Indulgence. The brothers became the founding members of Mindless Self Indulgence and soon found guitarist Steve Montano (Steve, Righ?) and drummer Jennifer Dunn (Kitty). The brothers released a second album, Crappy Little Demo, before Markus left the group and was replaced by bassist Vanessa Y.T.

=== Other work ===
Urine has remixed songs by Serj Tankian, Grimes, Devo, Deep Forest, Korn, KMFDM, Iwrestledabearonce, and Serart. He has been known to completely restructure the songs he remixes as well as add his own vocal parts. He also produced the original version of "Revolution" by Aimee Allen.

Urine and Mindless Self Indulgence guitarist Steve, Righ? have a side project called The Left Rights. They have released a self-titled album and a second album titled Bad Choices Made Easy.

Urine worked as a composer for the 2012 video game Lollipop Chainsaw, in which he also voiced the character Zed. He provided the voice for The Body in M Dot Strange's 2012 animated film Heart String Marionette. He also appeared in Darren Lynn Bousman's 2015 musical horror film Alleluia! The Devil's Carnival.

Urine played a Ravager named Half-Nut in the 2017 Marvel film Guardians of the Galaxy Vol. 2. He also wrote a song for the film called "Un Deye Gon Hayd (The Unloved Song)", which is heard in the film but does not appear on the soundtrack album.

Urine released a self-titled solo album under the name Euringer in October 2018. The album features appearances from Serj Tankian, Grimes, Gerard Way, and Chantal Claret.

In 2020, Urine voiced Kid K Beatz in two episodes of the cyberpunk musical web series X-RL7. That same year, Urine and Tankian released the collaborative album Fuktronic.

== Legal issues ==
In 1999, Euringer took out his penis onstage while performing with Mindless Self Indulgence in Michigan, for which he spent a night in jail after being arrested for indecent exposure. In 2020, he recalled, "Of all the people on that tour, I get busted for whipping out my cock and lighting myself on fire. I spent the weekend in jail, actually. They didn't even give me a phone call. And I still had my whole pink outfit and dress on in jail. It was fun."

In August 2021, a lawsuit was filed against Euringer in New York Supreme Court with the charge of sexual battery of a minor. The accuser (whose identity was left anonymous as she was a minor at the time) claimed that she had a sexual relationship with Euringer from January 1997 to June 1999, beginning when she was 15 and he was 27. The suit alleged that Euringer "groomed and manipulated [her] into believing that his sexually assaultive behavior was not criminal and that by engaging in sexual activity with him [she] was actually helping to protect younger girls from sexual assaults." Euringer also allegedly wrote her a letter wishing her a happy fifteenth birthday. The suit added, "During this time, Euringer acted as and treated her as though she was his girlfriend and the two were in a consensual relationship." It is alleged that he took pictures of her naked throughout the relationship and requested that she "act like a small child, suck her thumb, drool, and pee in her pants" during sexual intercourse. He also allegedly bought her a fake ID so she could go to concerts with him and drink alcohol. After she became convinced they were in a relationship, he allegedly tried to hide their relationship by telling her not to act affectionately with him while in public. The lawsuit claimed that she had suffered emotional distress since the relationship started. Also named in the lawsuit is Warner Music Group Corp, WMG's former parent company Warner Communications LLC, Elektra Entertainment Group, and Joseph Galus, the band's manager and producer. The lawsuit claims that Elektra and Galus knew about and enabled Euringer's behavior and are guilty of negligence and aiding and abetting sexual battery. It also alleges that Elektra assisted Mindless Self Indulgence in developing tour T-shirts featuring a photo of the girl while she was still a minor, and that Galus and an Elektra A&R executive saw Euringer touching and kissing the girl during the band's recording sessions. The lawsuit against Elektra and WMG was dismissed in full on March 31, 2023, and Galus was voluntarily dismissed from the lawsuit on April 26, 2023. On March 28, 2024, all charges against Euringer were dismissed with prejudice.

== Personal life ==
Euringer married singer and musician Chantal Claret on January 18, 2008. In 2018, they relocated to New Zealand and settled in Wellington. Their identical twin daughters were born in 2019.

== Discography ==
=== Solo ===
- The Secret Cinematic Sounds of Jimmy Urine (2017)
- Euringer (2018; as Euringer)

=== with Mindless Self Indulgence ===
- Mindless Self-Indulgence (1995)
- Tight (1999)
- Frankenstein Girls Will Seem Strangely Sexy (2000)
- You'll Rebel to Anything (2005)
- If (2008)
- How I Learned to Stop Giving a Shit and Love Mindless Self Indulgence (2013)

=== with The Left Rights ===
- The Left Rights (2002)
- Bad Choices Made Easy (2010)

=== with Serj Tankian ===
- Fuktronic (2020)

=== with Chantal Claret ===
- Secret Songs (2014)
