= Mindless Self Indulgence =

American electropunk band

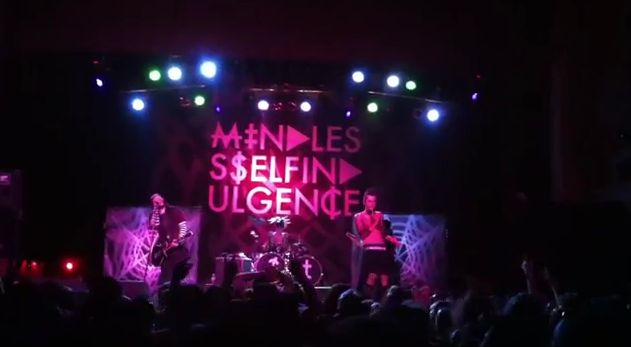
- Mindless Self Indulgence performing in 2012

Background information
- Origin: New York City, U.S.
- Genres: Electropunk; industrial rock; digital hardcore
- Years active: 1997–2014
- Labels: Elektra; Metropolis; The End; Uppity Cracker
- Members: Jimmy Urine; Steve, Righ?; Kitty; Lyn-Z
- Past members: Markus Euringer; Vanessa Y.T.
- Website: mindlessselfindulgence.com

Mindless Self Indulgence (often abbreviated as MSI) is an American electropunk band formed in New York City in 1997. Their music has a mixed style which includes punk rock, alternative rock, electronica, techno, industrial, hip-hop, and breakbeat hardcore. The band features Jimmy Urine on vocals, Steve, Righ? on guitar, Lyn-Z on bass guitar, and Kitty on drums.

== History ==
Between 1987 and 1996, Jimmy Urine recorded about 35 songs which varied in musical style, usually settling in an industrial/electronic punk style. These songs were recorded with himself and his brother, Markus Euringer in New York City using rudimentary equipment. Urine and his brother released an album titled Mindless Self-Indulgence, featuring Steve, Righ? on 'Bed of Roses', which featured songs performed in an industrial style akin to Nine Inch Nails.

In 1997, Urine recorded a cover of Method Man's "Bring the Pain" that was made by merging six different styles of the same cover into one song. This became the basis for the Mindless Self Indulgence sound. The band formed soon after when Urine was joined by Steve, Righ? on guitar, Urine's brother Markus Euringer on second guitar (replaced by bassist Vanessa Y.T., who was subsequently replaced by bassist Lyn-Z), and Kitty on drums. They have released five albums, four EPs, eight remix albums, one live album, two compilation albums, and one live DVD. Rather than signing traditional record contracts, the band has licensed most of their albums to record labels, retaining ownership of the music.

In summer of 2007, the band toured as part of the Revolution Stage of Projekt Revolution, a music festival hosted by Linkin Park. In January 2009, the band headlined the Kerrang! Relentless Energy Drink tour.

In December 2010, they released a comic titled Adventures Into Mindless Self Indulgence about various tour stories and significant moments of the band's career. The band released a remastered CD/DVD version of their first full-length album, Tight, in 2011, titled Tighter. It included bonus tracks and recordings from their early days. On October 25, 2012, the band announced their fifth album via a Kickstarter campaign. How I Learned to Stop Giving a Shit and Love Mindless Self Indulgence was released in May 2013, following with the release of singles "It Gets Worse" in December and "Fuck Machine" in January 2014. Later in January 2014, the band announced that they would be taking a hiatus.

On September 18, 2015, Mindless Self Indulgence released Pink, a collection of 19 songs recorded between 1990 and 1997 by Urine. The album includes cut-down and remastered versions of songs from the self-titled album, an audio diary recorded by Urine from July 1992, and covers of Depeche Mode's "Personal Jesus" and Duran Duran's "Girls on Film".

On August 9, 2021, a lawsuit was filed against James Euringer (Jimmy Urine) in New York Supreme Court with the charge of sexual battery of a minor, who claims that she had a sexual relationship with Euringer for over two years — from January 1997 to June 1999 — starting when she was 15 years old and Euringer was 27. On March 26, 2024, all charges against Euringer were dismissed with prejudice after all parties involved in the suit agreed to a stipulation of dismissal.

On June 20, 2024, the band released MSI B-Sides Vol. 1 without any prior notice. The album contained songs that had not been previously available on streaming, but had been released on their previous EPs and singles.

== Members ==
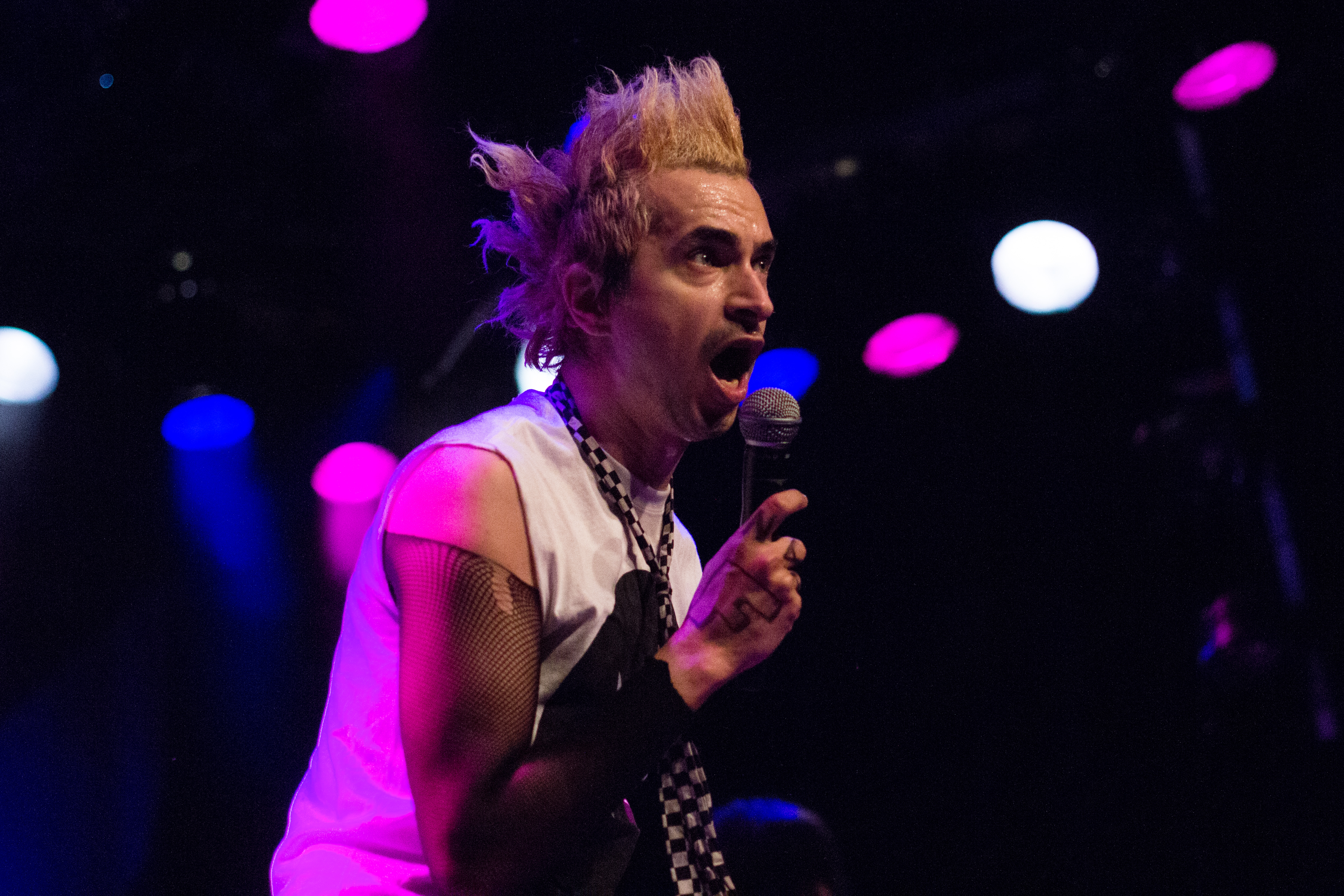
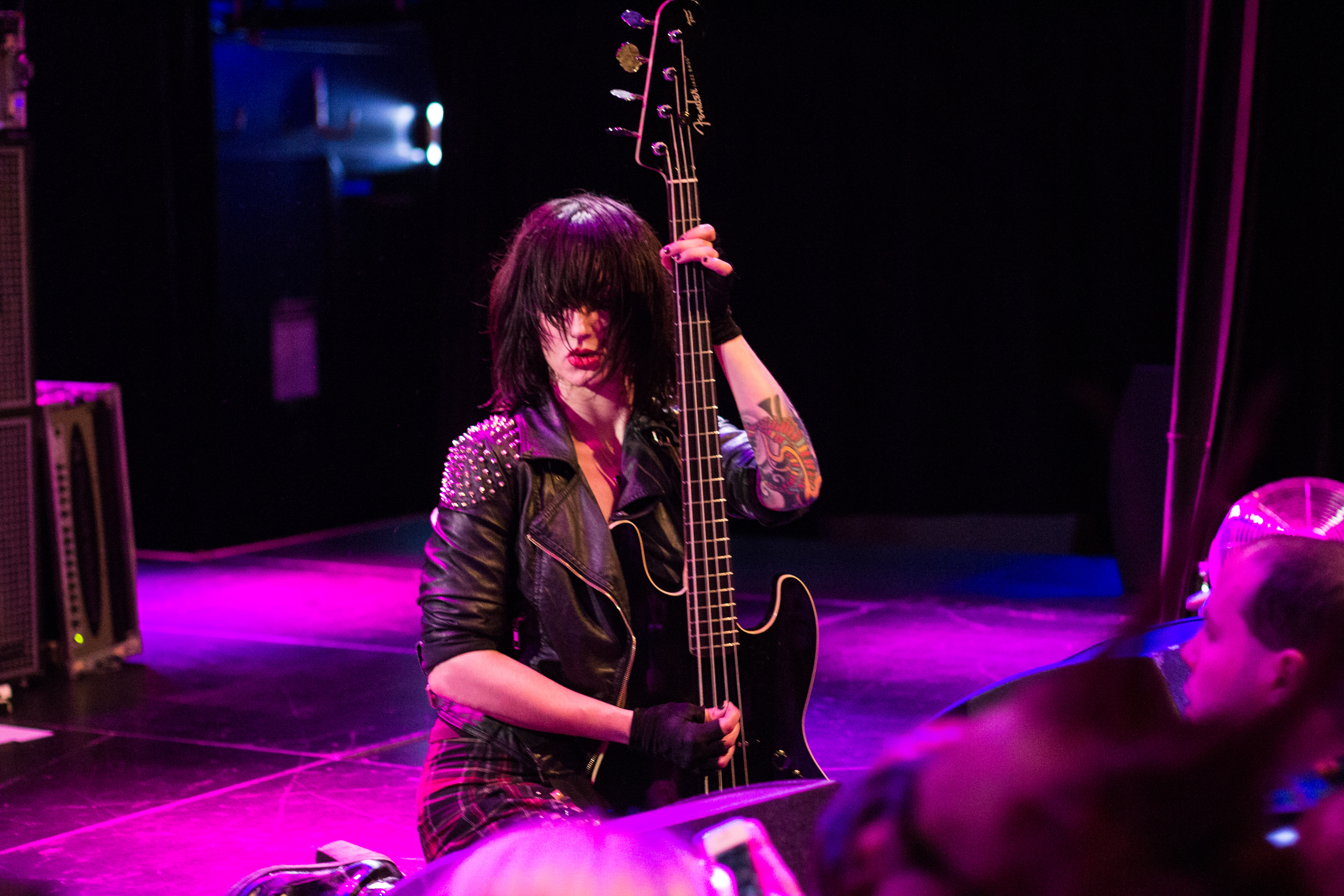
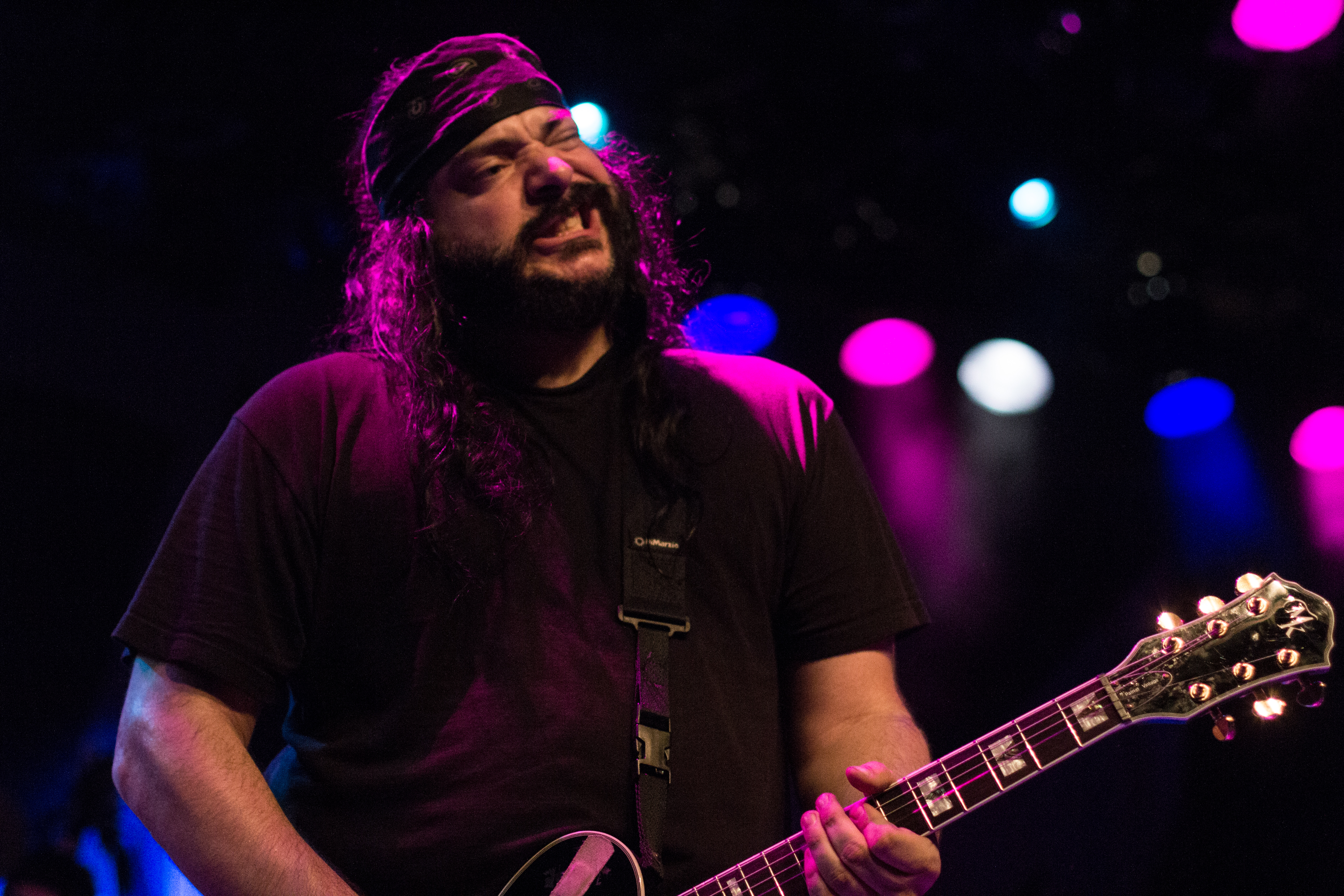
Jimmy Urine, Lyn-Z, and Steve, Righ? in 2013

=== Current members ===
- Jimmy Urine (James Euringer) – lead vocals, synthesizer, programming (1995–present)
- Steve, Righ? (Steve Montano) – guitars, backing vocals (1997–present)
- Kitty (Jennifer Dunn) – drums (1997–present)
- Lyn-Z (Lindsey Way) – bass (2001–present)

=== Former members ===
- Markus Euringer – keyboard, turntables (1995–1998)
- Vanessa Y.T. – bass (1998–2001)

== Discography ==
=== Studio albums ===
Title	Album details	Chart peaks		
Title	Album details	US	US Indie	UK
Mindless Self-Indulgence	Release date: September 18, 1995; Label: Chip Records	—	—	—
Tight	Release date: April 20, 1999; Label: Uppity Cracker	—	—	—
Frankenstein Girls Will Seem Strangely Sexy	Release date: February 22, 2000; Label: Elektra	—	—	—
You'll Rebel to Anything	Release date: April 12, 2005; Label: Metropolis	107	4	—
If	Release date: April 29, 2008; Label: The End	27	2	132
How I Learned to Stop Giving a Shit and Love Mindless Self Indulgence	Release date: May 14, 2013; Label: Uppity Cracker	103	22	—
"—" denotes releases that did not chart or were not certified.

=== Live albums ===
Title	Album details
Alienating Our Audience	Release date: October 8, 2002; Label: Uppity Cracker

=== Compilations ===
Title	Album details
Pink	Release date: September 18, 2015; Label: Metropolis
MSI B-Sides Vol. 1	Release date: June 20, 2024; Label: Uppity Cracker

=== Demo albums ===
- Crappy Little Demo (1997)
- Thank God (2002)

=== EPs ===
Title	EP details
Despierta Los Niños	Release date: October 31, 2003; Label: Uppity Cracker
Another Mindless Rip Off	Release date: December 5, 2006; Label: Metropolis
<3	Release date: February 13, 2010

=== Singles ===
Year	Song	Chart peak		Album
Year	Song	US Dance	UK	Album
1995	"Do Unto Others (Part II) / Bed of Roses"	—	—	Mindless Self-Indulgence
1999	"Bring the Pain / Tight"	—	—	Tight
1999	"Bring the Pain / Panty Shot"	—	—	Tight
2000	"Bitches"	—	—	Frankenstein Girls Will Seem Strangely Sexy
2000	"Bitches/Molly"	—	—	Frankenstein Girls Will Seem Strangely Sexy / Tight
2000	"Planet of the Apes"	—	—	Frankenstein Girls Will Seem Strangely Sexy
2006	"Shut Me Up"	1	—	You'll Rebel to Anything
2006	"Straight to Video"	1	—	You'll Rebel to Anything
2008	"Mastermind"	—	—	If
2008	"3 S'"	—	—	Non-album single
2008	"Never Wanted to Dance"	1	180	If
2008	"(It's 3AM) Issues"	4	—	If
2008	"On It"	2	—	If
2008	"Pay for It"	1	—	If
2009	"Evening Wear/Mark David Chapman"	1	—	If
2013	"Ala Mode"	—	—	How I Learned to Stop Giving a Shit and Love Mindless Self Indulgence
2013	"It Gets Worse"	—	—	How I Learned to Stop Giving a Shit and Love Mindless Self Indulgence
2014	"Fuck Machine"	—	—	How I Learned to Stop Giving a Shit and Love Mindless Self Indulgence
2015	"Personal Jesus"	—	—	Pink
"—" denotes releases that did not chart.

=== The Left Rights ===
Side project by Jimmy Urine and Steve, Righ?

The Left Rights

- Released: September 24, 2002
- Label: Uppity Cracker

Bad Choices Made Easy

- Released: November 9, 2010
- Label: Metropolis

== Videography ==
=== Video albums ===
Year	Album details
2007	Our Pain, Your Gain: Released: September 11, 2007; Label: Uppity Cracker
