= Karaté Bushido =

- Editor: Ghislaine Barissat
- Categories: Martial arts
- Publisher: Europ-Mag
- First issue: 1974; 51 years ago
- Country: France
- Language: French
- Website: karatebushido.com

Karaté Bushido is a French magazine who publishes martial arts stories from around the world. The magazine was founded in 1974, a few months after the death of Bruce Lee. Karaté Bushido is the oldest magazine dedicated to martial arts in Europe and has been referred as the equivalent to Black Belt magazine in the United States. The magazine is also the organizer and founder of the world renowned Festival des Arts Martiaux since 1985.

== History ==
Founded in 1974, Karate Bushido is the first magazine in France devoted to combat sports including Karate, Taekwondo, Kung Fu, Aikido, Brazilian jiu-jitsu, Muaythai, Kickboxing, Lethwei and more. The magazine was founded by Europ-Mag a few months after the death of Bruce Lee at a time when the world of martial arts was mourning his death. Lee became the posthumous godfather of the magazine. Since 1985, the magazine is known for organizing the Festival des Arts Martiaux in Bercy, Paris.

== Festival des Arts Martiaux ==
The Festival des Arts Martiaux is an event founded by Karaté Bushido, held annually at the Accor Arena, previously named Palais Omnisports de Paris-Bercy. Founded in 1985, the festival showcases martial arts masters from around the world. In 2015, to celebrate its 30 years the festival was held at the Palais des congrès de Paris. The festival usually hosts around 10,000 spectators, and received famous headliners over the years such has the Shaolin monks in 1989, Jean-Claude Van Damme in 1990, masters of Okinawa karate in 1993, Rickson Gracie in 1995, Jose Aldo in 2014.

== Cover edition ==
Notable martial artists that made the cover of the magazine over the years.

- 1974 – (China) Bruce Lee
- 1993 – (France) Jean-Claude Van Damme
- 1997 – (Netherlands) Bas Rutten
- 1998 – (Brazil) Rickson Gracie
- 2000 – (China) Jackie Chan
- 2007 – (Russia) Fedor Emelianenko
- 2008 – (Canada) Georges St-Pierre
- 2012 – (France) Jérôme Le Banner
- 2019 – (France) Francis Ngannou
- 2020 – (Canada) Dave Leduc

== Awards ==
MM'Awards

- 2013 French Photographer of the Year (Johann Vayriot, Karaté Bushido)

== See also ==
- Black Belt magazine
- Inside Kung Fu
- Kung Fu Magazine
- Journal of Asian Martial Arts
- Fightmag
