= Stephan Berwick =

American actor

- Website: http://www.truetaichi.com

Stephan Berwick is an American author, martial artist, and actor known for his scholarly research on traditional Chinese martial arts – particularly Chen-style taijiquan, and roles in early Yuen Wo-ping Hong Kong Action films.

== Biography ==
=== As a martial artist ===
Berwick began martial arts training in 1976 with Shotokan Karate and later went on to study various other traditional martial arts. After becoming intrigued with Chinese martial arts, he began studying under Bow Sim Mark at the Chinese Wushu Research Institute (CWRI) in 1982. In addition to traditional and contemporary wushu, Berwick also practiced western boxing and Muay Thai. While training at the CWRI, he became friends with Ms. Bow's son, Donnie Yen. With Ms. Bow's sponsorship, Berwick and Donnie Yen traveled to China, and became the first two foreign students to train at the Shaanxi Athletic Technical Institute under the acclaimed martial arts champion, Zhao Changjun and his coach, the pioneering wushu champion, Bai Wenxiang. With this training Berwick went on to play lead roles in Hong Kong action films (see below).

After returning to the United States in 1990, Berwick’s focus shifted to the internal arts and he became a student of Chen Taijiquan master Ren Guangyi. As one of Ren’s original four indoor disciples, Berwick is also extensively mentored by other Chen family grandmasters, and in 2000 trained at Chen Village (the historical birthplace of Taiji), Henan Province, China.

In the summer of 2006, the Journal of Asian Martial Arts (JMA) featured Berwick as its cover subject – one of a just a handful of leading Chen Taiji proponents and the first Western Chen Taiji specialist recognized thus. Inside Kung Fu (IKF) magazine followed with a profile written by IKF writer of the year, Robert Dreeben, with Berwick sharing the January 2007 IKF cover with Thai action film star, Tony Jaa.

As a Washington, DC–based Taiji instructor, Berwick sponsors a growing number of seminars with the aforementioned Chen Taiji grandmasters, with the intent of continuing to spread authentic Chen-style Taijiquan, as originated and passed down in Chen Village, China.

In 2008, Berwick created the True Strength training regimen which promises internal and external physical benefits for both health and combat preparation. The program is available on DVD from DragonDoor. Currently, the first part of the program, True Streng Yang is described as an external body toughening method - to be followed by the forthcoming, True Strength Yin, which is described as an internal qigong regimen.

=== As an actor ===
In 1987, Berwick travelled to Hong Kong with Donnie Yen and met Yuen Wo-ping, the action/fight choreographer for later blockbuster films such as Kill Bill, The Matrix, and Crouching Tiger, Hidden Dragon.

At the time, Yuen and Donnie were interested in moving from traditional period films to modern police-type martial arts movies with a Miami Vice flavor. Part of their vision was to find highly qualified foreign martial artists who could add a contemporary urban feel, and express martial arts creatively at a high standard. Berwick was cast in three of these movies, which represent the early fruits of this vision. Exhibiting highly complex kicking techniques in these films, he earned the nickname 'Vicious Legs.' Although Berwick was set to portray a 'good guy' role in another film, the 1989 Tiananmen Square protests and massacre lead to the significant delay or shutdown of many large scale Hong Kong action cinema projects. After waiting in vain for the project to begin, Berwick decided to end his acting career and returned to the United States. With the experience gained in the film industry, he has performed, written, edited, and narrated instructional martial arts videos and other media.

In 2010, Berwick wrote and directed the short film Final Weapon, starring Ren Guangyi, Michael Woods, and featuring music and an appearance by rock music icon Lou Reed.

==== Filmography ====
- YouTube Montage of Stephan Berwick's Hong Kong Film Performances
- Tiger Cage (1988)
- In the Line of Duty 3 (1988)
- In the Line of Duty 4 (1989)
- Final Weapon (2010)

=== As an author ===
Since 1996, Berwick has co-authored five books and two dozen substantive articles in various martial arts publications such as the Journal of Asian Martial Arts (JMA), Kung Fu Tai Chi (KFTC), and IKF. Much of the material focuses on relating core Taiji concepts and principles that were previously unavailable in English, or rarely seen at best. As such, three of his articles have been listed as select research references in Asian martial tradition by the Via Media Publishing Corporation (Publishers of the Journal of Asian Martial Arts).

One of his first pieces, "Five Levels of Combat Training in Chen Taijiquan", which originally appeared in IKF in 1998, was chosen as a select piece for the book, Ultimate Guide to Tai Chi, (Contemporary Books, 2000). Of special note is his JMA scholarly article presenting analysis and translations (by his student, Chinese linguist Dan Butler) of the classic Taiji writings of Chen family scholar Chen Xin. The article meshed commentary from Chen Xiaowang, with Chen Xin's most technical writings for a martial arts study of historical significance.

Previously, Berwick completed primary research on Chen Taijiquan at Taiji's birthplace, Chenjiagou in 2000, resulting in seminal publications such as "Chen Taijiquan's Generation X & Y Masters Exposed" – the first article to appear in the American martial art press, in KFTC, about emerging Chen family masters, including Chen Bing and Chen Ziqiang and "Chen Village Under the Influence of Chen Xiaoxing" – the first major profile of the top Chen Village master, in the JMA. Through sharing of his unique access with teaching, research, sponsorship, and a command of classical Chinese martial art skills, he has been instrumental in bringing traditional Chen Taiji to the West.

==== Articles profiling Stephan Berwick (2007–2009) ====
- "History is the Best Teacher: Kung Fu Pioneer Stephan Berwick", Kung Fu Tai Chi, 2008
- "Chen Taiji Combat", Inside Kung Fu, 2007
- "Stephan Berwick's Martial Arts Journey", Journal of Asian Martial Arts, 2006

==== Articles written by Stephan Berwick (1996–2009) ====
- "Qingping Sword: The Last Remaining Chinese Sword System?", Journal of Asian Martial Arts, 2009
- "Innovation in Traditional Martial Arts", Kung Fu Tai Chi, 2008
- "Martial Arts As Performance Art: From Opera to the Olympics", Kung Fu Tai Chi, 2006
- "Taiji Principles for Business and Life, A Martial Arts Profile of Jonathan Miller, CEO AOL", Kung Fu Tai Chi, 2006
- "Chen Xiaoxing, The Simple Wisdom of a Village Grandmaster", Kung Fu Tai Chi, 2005.
- "Chen Village Headmaster Chen Xiaoxing", Inside Kung Fu, 2005
- "Taiji and Pop Culture, Tony Visconti: Taiji Practitioner & Rock/Pop Producer", Kung Fu Tai Chi, 2005
- "Book Review: Old Frame Chen Family Taijiquan"; Journal of Asian Martial Arts, 2005
- "Chen Taiji Chin Na", Inside Kung Fu, 2004
- "Chen Taijiquan: The Ultimate Grappling Art?", Kung Fu Tai Chi, 2004
- "Chen Taiji as Avant Garde Performance Art: Lou Reed and Ren Guang Yi's Kung fu/Rock Brew", Kung Fu Tai Chi, 2003
- "Analysis of Chen Xin's Writings, with Commentary by Chen Xiaowang", Journal of Asian Martial Arts, 2003
- "Chen Taijiquan Broadsword", Inside Kung Fu, 2003
- "Chen Village Generation X&Y Masters Exposed", Kung Fu Qigong, 2002
- "The Silk Reeling Underpinnings of Chen Taiji Chin Na", Internal Martial Arts, 2001
- "Chen Xiaowang on Learning, Teaching, and Practicing Taijiquan", Journal of Asian Martial Arts, 2001
- "Donnie Yen: A Star on the Rise", Inside Kung Fu, 2001
- "Chen Village Under the Influence of Chen Xiaoxing", Journal of Asian Martial Arts, 2001
- "Donnie Yen: The Making of an American Martial Artist", Kung Fu Qigong, 2000
- "Chen Taijiquan Straight Sword", Kungfumagazine.com, 2000
- "Chen Taiji 38 Form", Kung Fu Qigong, 2000
- "Chen Taiji's Lao Jia & Xin Jia", Kung Fu Qigong, 1999
- "Discipleship in Chen Taijiquan", Inside Kung Fu, 1998
- "The 5 Levels of Combat Training in Chen Taijiquan", Inside Kung Fu, 1997 (also in Contemporary Books' Ultimate Tai Chi Chuan, 1999)
- "Combat Training in Chen Taijiquan", Kung Fu Qigong, 1996

==== Books (2003–2007) ====
- Taijiquan Hand and Sword (with Ren Guangyi), TC Media, 2007
- Practical Tai Chi (w/Jose Figueroa), Action Pursuit Group 2006
- Tai Chi for Kids (w/Jose Figueroa), Tuttle Publishing, August 2005
- Tai Chi Basics (w/Jose Figueroa), Tuttle Publishing, March 2005
- Taijiquan: Chen Taiji 38 Form & Applications (with Ren Guangyi & Jose Figueroa), Tuttle Publishing, 2003

== Additional sources and external links ==
- Florence, Richard. Bridging Tradition Through Eclecticism: Stephan Berwick’s Path to Classical Martial Arts. Journal of Asian Martial Arts 15 (2), 2006.
- Select Biography Chinese Martial Traditions
- TrueTaichi (Stephan Berwick’s website)
- Donnie Yen’s website In the Line of Duty 4 synopsis (Wayback Machine copy)
