= Mimi Chan =

American martial arts instructor

Mimi Chan (born in Boston, Massachusetts) is an American martial arts instructor and stunt performer.

== Early life ==
Chan moved with her family from Boston to Orlando, Florida, in 1980, where her training in martial arts began under her father, Pui Chan. By the age of 5, Chan was already performing in local exhibitions. She specialized in Kung Fu, open hand and weaponry.

Chan has won Grand Champion Titles and gold medals in multiple international martial arts tournaments, in which she was undefeated. She was also featured in articles in Kung Fu Magazine, and entered the Martial Arts Hall of Fame deemed "Woman of the Year" by Inside Kung Fu Magazine in 1999.

== Education ==
Chan earned a Bachelor of Science in Marketing and Business Administration from the University of Central Florida in 1999.

In 2022 Chan became the director of Make Us Visible Florida, a coalition dedicated to developing a preventative solution rooted in education as a response to anti-Asian American violence. Chan worked to pass legislation in 2023 in Florida that requires the instruction of AAPI history in the K-12 curriculum.

== Film and television appearances and Mulan ==
She was chosen as the model and martial arts video reference for Disney’s animated feature, Mulan. Character drawing sessions and live-action video reference shooting was done over the course of three years. Chan’s cousin, George Kee, was chosen to play the part of Captain Shang Li. Together, they choreographed fight sequences for the film's song “I’ll Make a Man Out of You” and the film's end finale. She worked with supervising animator Mark Henn. She has also appeared in television shows and worked with Hong Kong stunt teams.

== Film Directing and Stage Choreography ==
In 2011, Chan directed and produced a documentary about her father’s life, Pui Chan: Kung Fu Pioneer. The film world premiered in 2012 at the Central Florida Film Festival where it won two awards, "Best Documentary" and "Audience Choice."

Chan choreographed the Mulan and Shang fight sequence in Disney's Hollywood Studios 2022 reimagined live show Fantasmic! directed by Matthew Hamel.
