= Benjamin Pang Jeng Lo =

Tai chi instructor

Benjamin Pang Jeng Lo (Ben Lo / 罗邦桢 / 羅邦楨) (April 1927 - October 12, 2018) was a proponent of tai chi in the United States. Lo was a student of Cheng Man-ch'ing, translated several influential tai chi books into English, and was a teacher in his own right.

== Biography ==
Benjamin Pang Jeng Lo was born in Jiangsu Province, China. In 1948, he and family moved to Taiwan. In 1949, when Lo was ill, his father sent him to see Cheng Man-ch'ing, a well-known artist and practitioner of traditional Chinese medicine. Lo was not well enough to be treated with traditional herbs, so Cheng recommended he study tai chi to build up his strength. Lo began studying with him and continued to study and practice tai chi for the rest of his life.

Lo graduated from National Taiwan University with a degree in Chinese literature. He then worked in the government, and later completed a master's in public administration at National Chengchi University.

In 1974, with Cheng's encouragement, Lo moved to San Francisco, where he began teaching tai chi, establishing the Universal T'ai Chi Ch'uan studio. Along with teaching there, he traveled around the United States, Holland, Sweden and elsewhere in Europe, as well as Israel and Taiwan, holding workshops and camps for thousands of students. Lo was a staunch defender of Cheng's teachings and reputation. Lo often summarized his teaching into "Five basic principles for the development of good Tai Chi Ch'uan skills .... 1) Relaxation. 2) Separating Yin from Yang. 3) Turning the waist. 4) Keeping the body upright. And 5) Maintaining the hand like a beautiful lady's hand." Above all, he emphasized the need for practice.

Robert W. Smith, another martial artist and tai chi proponent, wrote that Lo was "the best example of Zheng's [Cheng's] teaching in the U.S., and possibly the world."

Lo died in San Francisco on October 12, 2018.

== Works ==
=== Translations ===
Lo was the lead translator for three books that were some of the earliest tai chi books available in English.

- Lo, Benjamin; Inn, Martin; Amacker, Robert; Foe, Susan (1979). The Essence of T'ai Chi Ch'uan: The Literary Tradition. Richmond, CA, US: North Atlantic Books. ISBN 978-0-913028-63-6. OCLC 1034662114 – via Internet Archive. Reissued in 2008: ISBN 978-0-615-22777-1, OCLC 891401586
- Chen, Weiming (1985). T'ai Chi Ch'uan Ta Wen: Questions and Answers on T'ai Chi Ch'uan. Translated by Lo, Benjamin Pang Jeng; Smith, Robert W. Berkeley, CA, US: North Atlantic Books. ISBN 978-0-938190-67-7. OCLC 1288495100 – via Internet Archive.
- Zheng, Manqing (1985) [1984]. Cheng Tzu's Thirteen Treatises on T'ai Chi Ch'uan. Translated by Lo, Benjamin; Inn, Martin. Berkeley, Calif: North Atlantic Books. ISBN 978-0-938190-45-5. OCLC 1285462584 – via Internet Archive. Reissued in 2008: ISBN 978-1-58394-220-8, OCLC 179834529

=== Videos ===
- Lo, Benjamin Pang Jeng; Inn, Martin (2010). The Lectures with Benjamin Pang Jeng Lo: Commentaries on The Essence of T'ai Chi Ch'uan. IRI Press. ASIN B0057AWH6S. OCLC 645664926.
- Lo, Benjamin Pang Jeng (1991). Simplified Tai Chi Ch'uan. Universal T'ai Chi Ch'uan Association. ASIN B000TQKV9K. OCLC 229458911.
