= Pui Chan =

Chinese martial artist

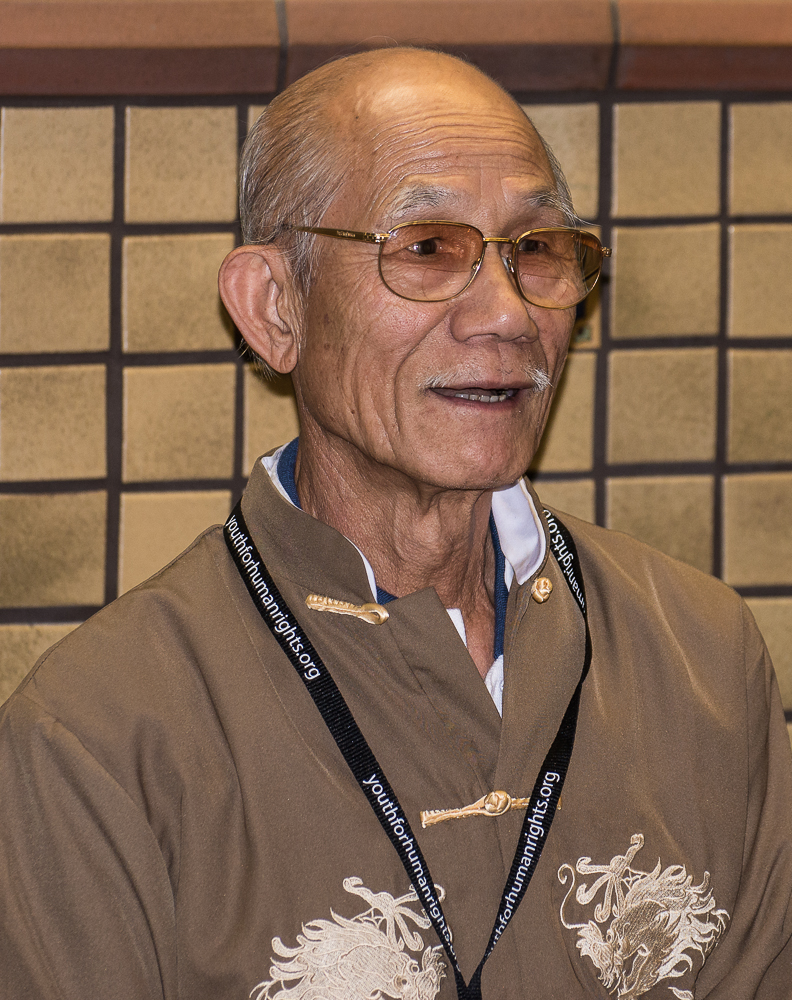
Chan at the Sunscreen Film Festival in 2013

Pui Chan (陳培) within martial arts, is the leader of the Wah Lum Pai Martial Arts Organization. He is a sixth generation successor of the Wah Lum Pai Tam Tui Northern Praying Mantis style as well as also being a 33rd generation successor of the Shaolin Temple. He was instrumental in bringing the Wah Lum martial arts style to the United States. Chan is the last living disciple of Lee Kwan Shan, and has since studied under several other masters.

== Martial arts training ==
Chan began training Wah Lum Pai at the age of six when he was accepted by Lee Kwan Shan. When Lee died, he finished his training under his senior Chan Wan Ching.

Chan also trained with numerous grandmasters in China studying kung fu.

== Wah Lum Pai history ==
Wah Lum Pai/Hua Lin Pai 華林派 (Elegant Forest Style) is a Chinese martial art that has its origins in the Northern Praying Mantis System (螳螂拳) created by Wang Long (王朗) in the Shaolin Monastery (少林寺) some 350 years ago.

After several generations, Ching Yueng (澄飬禪師) became the abbot of the Wah Lum Temple (華林寺) located in the Ping To District of the Shantung 山東 Province, China.

It was at the Wah Lum Temple (華林寺) that Lee Kwan Shan (李昆山), an exponent of his family's martial art Tam Tui style, would study Northern Praying Mantis to a level to be given the title of fifth generation heir/lineage holder.

Upon finishing his studies Lee Kwan Shan resumed his previous occupation as a guard and escort. After a successful career he retired with his remaining years traveling extensively around China, demonstrating his skill. Eventually he settled in a small Village named Sha Cheng where he began taking on students.

Two of Lee Kwan Shan’s most recognized students are Wan Ching Chan (陳雲青) and Pui Chan (陳培). Chan Wan Ching was Lee’s most senior student and continued his school in Hong Kong after his teacher’s death. Pui Chan finished up his training under Wan Ching Chan before resettling in the United States to open up his own school.

== USA school ==
Chan would later make his way to Hong Kong, by swimming from the mainland where he became a seaman. His job eventually moved him to New York City.

Subsequently, in 1968, Chan formed a kung fu school in Boston. In 1980, he and his family moved to Orlando, Florida, where he built the Wah Lum Kung-fu temple. It was the first of its kind in the United States where students of all ages and skill levels could go to live and train the Wah Lum Style daily. Additionally the temple served as a base for either sending American students to China, as well as bringing masters from China to teach in the United States.

== Lifetime achievements ==
Chan has been featured in many magazines and film documentaries over the years featuring his skill and business prowess in the martial arts industry.

Some of his features include:

- the Discovery Channel’s Secret of the Warrior’s Power
- Living Legends of Kung Fu (Vol. I)
- Warrior Within – Inside the Martial Arts

and various interviews and articles for:

- KungFu Magazine,
- Inside Kung Fu,
- Journal of Chinese Martial Arts

Chan has been honored with such awards as Instructor of the Year & Martial Artist of the Year by Inside Kung Fu Magazine and Black Belt Magazine as well as the 2003 inductee to Martial Arts Hall of Fame.

His Wah Lum organization makes contributions to many charities, such as donating the profits from all Wah Lum-hosted tournaments and events to the St. Jude Children’s Research Hospital, to support their care and research of cancer patients and terminally ill children.

== Personal life ==
Chan currently lives in Orlando with his wife, Suzy Chan, and his daughters, Mimi Chan and Tina Chan.

== See also ==
- History of martial arts
- Martial arts timeline
