= William Chen =

William Chen may refer to:

- Bill Chen (born 1970), American quantitative analyst, poker player and software designer
- William C. C. Chen (born 1935), Grandmaster of Yang-style tai chi
