= Donn F. Draeger =

Martial artist

- Draeger on the set of the James Bond film You Only Live Twice (1967), for which he served as martial arts coordinator
- Born: Donald Frederick Draeger; April 15, 1922; Milwaukee, Wisconsin, USA
- Died: October 20, 1982 (aged 60); Milwaukee, Wisconsin, USA
- Rank: Kyoshi menkyo in Tenshin Shōden Katori Shintō-ryū, 10th-dan Kyokushin Budokai, 5th-dan judo, 7th-dan kendo, 7th-dan iaido, Menkyo (post.) in Shindō Musō-ryū Jōdō, 7th-dan in jōdō. and 5th-dan Tomiki Aikido

Donald Frederick "Donn" Draeger (April 15, 1922 – October 20, 1982) was an American practitioner and teacher of martial arts. He was the author of several important books on Asian martial arts, and was a pioneer of international judo in the United States and Japan. He also helped make the study of martial arts an acceptable topic of academic research.

== Biography ==
=== Early life ===
Donald Frederick "Donn" Draeger was born in Milwaukee, Wisconsin, on April 15, 1922. His parents were Frank and Irma (Poetsch) Draeger. In 1940, at age 17, he was living in Milwaukee with his father, his stepmother Dora, two half-brothers, and his father's stepfather and mother. He was married in Bluefield, West Virginia, on June 18, 1949. During the next two years, Draeger and his wife had two sons. The family separated in the spring of 1951.

=== Military service ===
Draeger served in the United States Marine Corps from 1943 to 1956. He began his recruit training at Marine Corps Recruit Depot San Diego in January 1943. After graduation, he attended officer candidate school at Marine Barracks Quantico. He was commissioned a second lieutenant in April 1943.

Draeger received branch training as a signal officer, and in October 1944, he was assigned to Corps Signal Battalion, V Amphibious Corps. During February and March 1945, Corps Signal Battalion participated in the Battle of Iwo Jima.

In April 1945, Draeger was promoted to first lieutenant, and transferred to III Amphibious Corps, which was preparing for the planned invasion of Japan. However, when the Pacific War ended in August 1945, III Amphibious Corps instead went to North China to accept the surrender of Japanese soldiers, and from October 1945 to February 1946, Draeger served with a signal unit in Tianjin, China.

Draeger returned to the USA in the spring of 1946, and for the rest of the year, he served with Marine detachments in Illinois, Michigan, and Wisconsin.

In January 1947, he was reassigned to Camp Lejeune, North Carolina. While at Camp Lejeune, he was promoted to captain, commanded a company, and coached the base judo team.

During the summer of 1951, Draeger was sent to Korea, where he served as a signal officer in the 1st Marine Division. While in Korea, his secondary duties included teaching judo in the division support area near Hongcheon.

In October 1952, Draeger was reassigned to Headquarters Marine Corps. His primary duty assignment was with the Inter-American Defense Board. While in this billet, he held the rank of major. Upon completion of this assignment, Draeger reverted to his permanent rank of captain, and he separated from the service on June 30, 1956.

=== Post-military ===
In 1956, Draeger attended Georgetown University in Washington, DC, and in 1959, he was awarded the Bachelor of Science degree from Sophia University in Tokyo.

=== Martial Arts Training ===
Draeger reportedly began his involvement in the martial arts while living in the Chicago area, at around the age of 7 or 8. His first training was in Yoshin-ryu jujutsu, but he soon changed to judo and by age 10, he reportedly achieved the grade of 2nd kyu (the lower of the two levels of brown belt).

By 1948, Draeger was ranked 4th dan in judo. This grading occurred before 1947, so it probably occurred while he was stationed in China in 1946. His known judo instructors in Tianjin included Mike Matvey.

In 1952, Draeger was one of the leaders of the newly established US Judo Black Belt Association. This was the first national-level judo organization in North America, and the forerunner of what later became the United States Judo Federation. Draeger's national-level postings included vice-president of the Pan-American Judo Association and chairman of the Public Relations Committee of the Amateur Judo Association of the United States. He also helped promote judo throughout the Mid-Atlantic region of the United States.

Draeger officially represented US judo interests during international contests held in Cuba and Belgium in 1953, and in 1964, he was named the United States Amateur Athletic Union judo representative in Japan, in anticipation of judo's inclusion in the 1964 Olympics.

During this time, Draeger also trained in Chinese martial arts, learning baguazhang under Wang Shujin while in Japan. By mediation of his training partner Robert W. Smith, Draeger fought a challenge match against Huang Sheng-shyan, defeating him by a choke. Smith had previously tried to get him to fight the renowned Cheng Man-ch'ing, whom Draeger had previously criticized, but Draeger declined due to the heavy age difference between them.

Draeger also participated in judo activities in Japan. For instance, in 1961, Draeger and British judo athlete John Cornish were the first non-Japanese athletes selected to demonstrate nage-no-kata during the All-Japan Judo Championships. Draeger became a member of the Nihon Kobudo Shinkokai, the oldest Japanese cultural organization for the study and preservation of classical martial arts. He was the first non-Japanese practitioner of Tenshin Shōden Katori Shintō-ryū, achieving instructor status (kyoshi menkyo) in that system. He also held high ranks in Shindo Muso-ryu jodo, kendo, karate and aikido, among other arts.

Draeger studied the evolution and development of human combative behavior and was director of the International Hoplology Society (IHC) in Tokyo until his death in 1982.

=== Later years ===
In his later years, Draeger spent four months a year on field trips throughout Asia. While on these trips, he visited schools and studied combative methods, which he analyzed and recorded. These studies were sometimes published as articles in various martial arts magazines, or put into books.

Draeger lived in Japan, China, Mongolia, Korea, Malaysia, and Indonesia. One of the books he wrote is Pentjak-Silat: The Indonesian Fighting Art (1970). In 1979, Draeger and his team visited the island of Sumatra. While visiting the Aceh tribe there, it appears that the entire group was somehow poisoned, perhaps deliberately. As a result, he developed severe amoebic dysentery, leading to hospitalization. Draeger began losing weight and he grew increasingly weak during this ordeal. His legs began to swell, causing him great pain, and he found it difficult to walk or train. His long devotion to martial arts training came to a gradual halt.

While he was getting treatment at Tripler Army Medical Center in Honolulu, it was discovered that he had developed cancer of the liver. Draeger died on October 20, 1982, at the Veterans Affairs Medical Center in Milwaukee. Cause of death was metastasized carcinoma. He was buried at Wood National Cemetery in Milwaukee on October 25, 1982. His grave lies in Section 4, site 377.^{[b]}

== Books and other media ==
Draeger wrote dozens of books and articles about the Asian martial arts. His most influential books were probably Asian Fighting Arts (written with Robert W. Smith, Tuttle, 1969) and Martial Arts and Ways of Japan (Weatherhill, 3 volumes, 1973–1974). Draeger's research, theories, and concepts inspired a generation of martial art researchers and practitioners, and as of 2012, many of his books remain in print.

Draeger briefly worked in film. Specifically, he served as martial arts coordinator for the James Bond film You Only Live Twice, where he also doubled for actor Sean Connery. He also appeared in at least one television documentary about the Japanese martial arts.

While living in Japan, Draeger collected woodblock prints, and in 2004, part of his collection of sumo prints was featured in an exhibition organized by the Seattle Asian Art Museum.

=== Publishing ===
Draeger wrote many books on the martial arts. Draeger's published works include:

- Judo Training Methods : A Sourcebook, with Takahiko Ishikawa, The Charles E. Tuttle Co., 1961
- ShaoLin Lohan Kung-Fu with co-author P'ng Chye Kim (from Penang, Malaysia, 1979) www.saolimcanada.com (ISBN 978-0-8048-1698-4)
- Pentjak-Silat The Indonesian Fighting Art, Kodansha International Ltd,1970
- Asian Fighting Arts (with Robert W. Smith), Kodansha International, 1969; re-titled Comprehensive Asian Fighting Arts upon republication, 1980 (ISBN 978-0870114366)
- Classical Bujutsu : Martial Arts And Ways Of Japan, Vol I., Weatherhill, 1973, 1996
- Classical Budo: Martial Arts And Ways Of Japan, Vol II., Weatherhill, 1973, 1996
- Modern Bujutsu & Budo: Martial Arts And Ways Of Japan, Vol III., Weatherhill, 1974, 1996
- Javanese Silat: The Fighting Art of Perisai Diri, Kodansha International Ltd, 1978
- Japanese Swordsmanship : Technique And Practice (with Gordon Warner), Weatherhill, 1982
- The Weapons and Fighting Arts of Indonesia (ISBN 978-0804817165)
- Phoenix-Eye Fist: A Shaolin Fighting Art of South China
- Shantung Black Tiger: A Shaolin Fighting Art of North China (with Leo Budiman Prakarsa and Quintin T. G. Chambers), Weatherhill, 1976 (ISBN 978-0834801226)
- Judo Formal Techniques: A Complete Guide to Kodokan Randori No Kata
- Ninjutsu: The Art of Invisibility, Japan's Feudal Age Espionage Methods, Lotus Press, 1977; Phoenix Books, 1994
