= Sam FS Chin =

Sam F.S. Chin (Chin Fan Siong, 曾帆祥, born August 1, 1954) is the Grandmaster and Gatekeeper of the martial art called I Liq Chuan, and also known as "the Martial Art of Awareness". Sam Chin developed the grading system and the pedagogical method known as Zhong Xin Dao.

== Martial arts career ==
Chin was trained since childhood by his father, Chin Lik Keong, founder of I Liq Chuan, and in 1978, he won the state heavy weight kickboxing championships of Selangor (Malaysia). In August 2009 Chin was officially named the Gate Keeper and Lineage Holder of the I Liq Chuan. He is also the founder and President of Chin Family I Liq Chuan Association that supports the martial art's growth.

Chin has taught workshops worldwide, written two books on his family's martial art, co-authored articles, and produced a series of DVDs. Chin was interviewed by Jess O'Brien for his 2007 book "Nei Jia Quan: Internal Martial Arts".

In August 2009, Chin was also recognized by the USA Wushu Kungfu Federation as a Hall of Fame Outstanding Master. In 2014, he was written about by Ashe Higgs in Kung Fu Tai Chi Magazine "Finding the Center: I Liq Chuan’s Three Essential Qualities for Offense and Defense as One". Chin was also the subject of the 2016 CCTV Documentary "Kung Fu Abroad: I Liq Chuan 中央电视台《功夫在外》纪录片".

On November 15, 2017 Sam Chin became an honorary professor at the University of Plovdiv, Bulgaria in recognition of his lifetime of achievement in spreading I Liq Chuan.

== Publications ==
=== Books ===
- I Liq Chuan: Martial Art of Awareness
- Zhong Xin Dao I Liq Chuan System Guide Booklet.

=== Magazine Articles ===
- “The Matrix of I Liq Chuan” in the March/April 2005 issue of Kung Fu Tai Chi Magazine.

=== Training Videos ===
- Introduction to 15 Basic Exercises – 2 DVDs
- Grading Criteria for Instructors – 15 Basic Exercises – 3 DVDs
- Tai Chi Point Training – Introducing Fa-Jing Workshop – DVD
- I Liq Chuan Butterfly Form – Sequence (English with Russian Translation) Instructional – DVD
- I Liq Chuan Butterfly Form – Application & Fajing (English with Russian Translation) Instructional – DVD
- Five Elements In I Liq Chuan – DVD
- Spinning Hands Process – DVD
- Sticky & Spinning Hands – Upper Hands Process – DVD
- Sticky Hands – Introduction to Lower Hand Process – DVD
- San Da Vol. 1 – Introduction to San Shou – DVD
- San Da Vol. 2 – DVD
- San Da Vol. 3 – Applications of 5 Elements – DVD
- San Da Vol. 4 – Throwing Hands – DVD
- San Da Vol. 5 – Timing And Spacing – DVD
- San Da vol. 6 – Kicking – DVD
- I Liq Chuan Chin-Na: A Flowing Process – 2 DVDs
- Introduction to Phoenix Eye Workshop – DVD
- Structure And Energy – DVD
- Introduction to Nei Gong & Engagement Qualities (w/Russian Translation) – 3 DVDs
- Knowing The Moment – Point of Contact – DVD
- Meet And Match – DVD
- Chi Kung for Health – DVD
