= Kauz =

Kauz is a German surname meaning screech owl. Notable people with the surname include:

- Herman Kauz (born 1928), American martial arts teacher
- Jürgen Kauz (born 1974), Austrian footballer

== See also ==
- KAUZ
