= Cheng Man-ch'ing =

Chinese martial artist (1902–1975)

Cheng Man-ch'ing 郑曼青
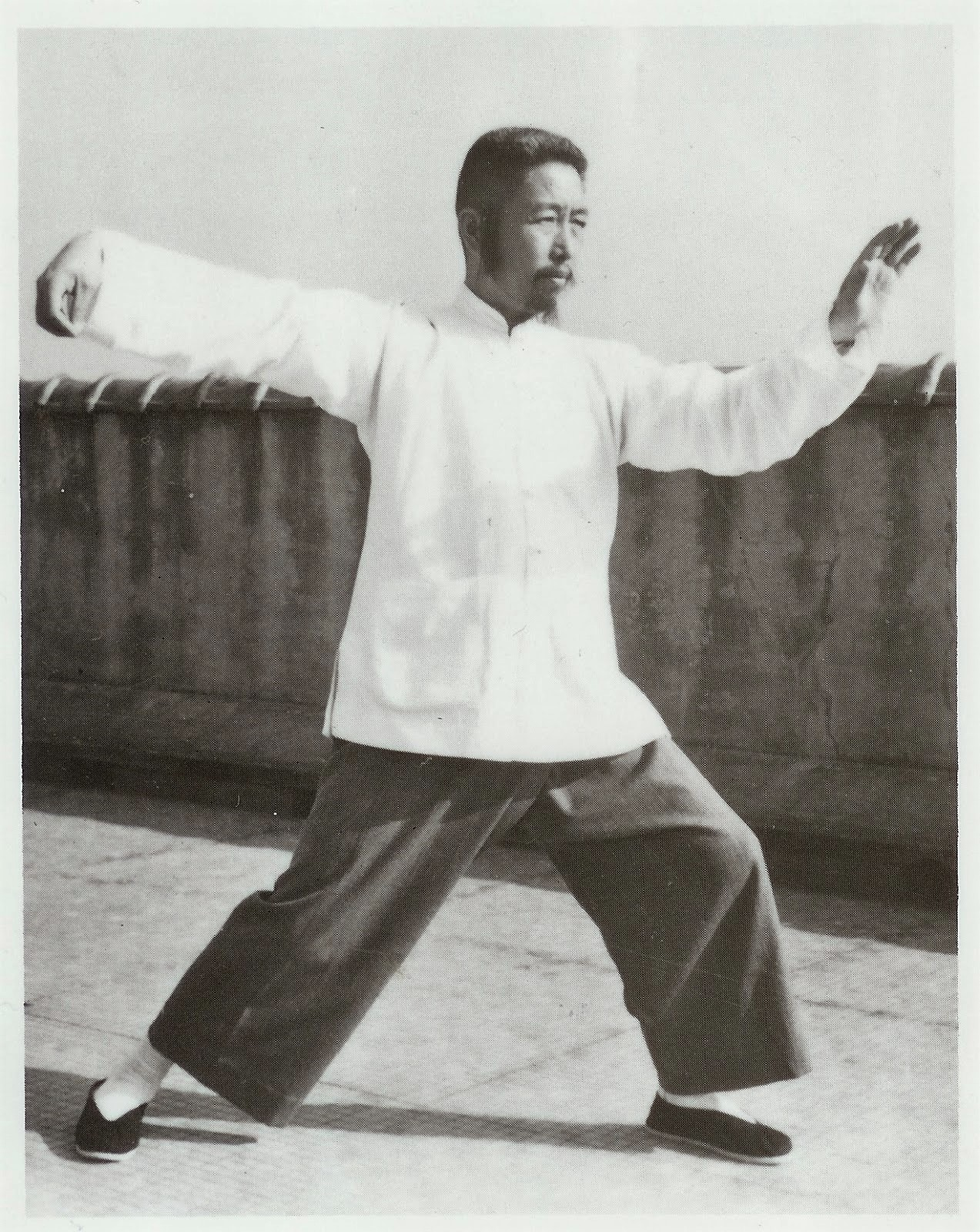
- Cheng Man-ch'ing practicing tai chi
- Born: 29 July 1902; Yongjia, Zhejiang, China
- Died: 26 March 1975 (aged 72); Taipei, Republic of China
- Nationality: Chinese
- Style: Yang-style tai chi (4th gen. Yang-style)

Other information
- Occupation: artist, teacher
- Spouse: Juliana Ting Cheng
- Notable students: (in Taiwan:)Benjamin Pang Jeng Lo; Robert W. Smith; William C. C. Chen; Huang Xingxian

Cheng Man-ch'ing
- Traditional Chinese: 鄭曼青
- Simplified Chinese: 郑曼青
Transcriptions
Standard Mandarin
- Hanyu Pinyin: Zhèng Mànqīng
- Wade–Giles: Cheng Man-ch'ing

Cheng Man-ch'ing or Zheng Manqing (29 July 1902 - 26 March 1975) was a Chinese expert of tai chi, Chinese medicine, and the so-called three perfections: calligraphy, painting and poetry. He was born in Yongjia (present-day Wenzhou), Zhejiang Province, during the Qing dynasty. Cheng died March 26, 1975; his grave is near the city of Taipei in Taiwan.

Because of his skills in the 3 Perfections or "Excellences" – considered to be among some of the traditional skills and pastimes of a Confucian scholar – plus medicine and tai chi, he was often referred to as the "Master of Five Excellences." Because he had been a college professor, his students in the USA called him "Professor Cheng."

== Early years ==
Cheng's father died when Cheng was very young. Around the age of nine, Cheng was struck on the head by a falling object, and was in a coma for a short while. He recuperated slowly, and was apprenticed to a well-known artist, Wang Xiangchan 汪香禪, in hopes that simple jobs like grinding ink would help his health. Wang taught Cheng's aunt Zhang Hongwei 張紅薇, as well as fellow townsmen Ma Mengrong and Ma Gongyu, all of whom became quite well-known. Within a few years, Cheng's teacher sent him out to earn his living by painting. During Cheng's childhood, his mother took him out to find medicinal plants and taught him the fundamentals of traditional Chinese herbal medicine.

By the age of eighteen, Cheng was teaching poetry and art in Beijing and within a few years had become a successful artist whose works were in demand. His aunt's friend Cai Yuanpei gave him a letter of introduction that led him to Shanghai, where he became acquainted with influential figures including Wu Changshuo, Zheng Xiaoxu, Xu Beihong, and Zhang Daqian. He took a position as the Dean of the Department of Traditional Painting at the prestigious Shanghai College of Art, which was headed by Liu Haisu. Cheng participated in national and international exhibitions, including one in 1933 organized by Xu Beihong, and was deeply involved with a number of art societies, including the Bee Society. These groups met to socialize, paint, and organize fundraising exhibitions. Around 1930, Cheng left the Shanghai College of Art and with Huang Binhong, and other leading artists, founded the College of Chinese Culture and Art. The school was forced to close upon the Japanese invasion.

In his twenties, Cheng developed lung disease (believed to be tuberculosis partly from exposure to the chalk dust from the school blackboards). Ill to the point of coughing up blood, he began to practice tai chi more diligently to aid his recovery. Cheng retired from teaching and devoted himself for several years to the study of tai chi, traditional Chinese medicine, and literature. His literary studies were with retired scholar Qian Mingshan.

In addition to his childhood instruction, Cheng Man-ch'ing received formal Chinese medical training. While he was teaching art in Shanghai, one of his friends grew ill and was unable to find relief. Cheng Man-ch'ing wrote a complex prescription for his friend, who took the medicine and recovered fully. One story from his memorial book is that a retired traditional doctor named Song You'an 宋幼庵 came across the prescription. He demanded to be put in contact with the person who wrote it, as the sophistication and erudition of the prescription showed exceptional talent and competence. As war was raging across China at that time, it took several years before Cheng Man-ch'ing was able to present himself for study. With Song, Cheng received instruction and became conversant with the Chinese pharmacopoeia. Dr Song was the twelfth generation of physician in his family; his medical school had a formidable collection of traditional medicines.

In the first lunar month of 1932, Cheng met the well-known master Yang Chengfu (1883–1936), with whom he began to study Yang-style tai chi, until Yang died. While the exact dates of Cheng's study with Yang are not clear, one of Yang's top students, scholar Chen Weiming wrote that Cheng studied six years with Yang. (Note: See Zheng Manqing's Zhengzi taijiquan shi san pian, p. i: In Search of Yang Cheng-Fu) Cheng, according to Yang's son Zhenji, ghostwrote Yang's second book Essence and Applications of Tai Chi or The Substance and Application of Tai Chi (Taijiquan tiyong quanshu, 1934), for which Cheng also wrote a preface and most likely arranged for the calligraphic dedications.

Cheng taught tai chi, practiced medicine, and continued his art practice in Sichuan Province during the Sino-Japanese war years. In this period he taught Abraham Liu while at the Central Military Academy, China's equivalent of West Point. [Reference 1 At age 32 he taught tai chi at the Central Military Academy (formerly the Huang-po Military Academy -equivalent to West Point in the United States.)"] By 1946, he had developed a significantly abbreviated 37-move version of Yang's traditional form. He wrote the manuscript for his Thirteen Chapters during this period, and showed them to his elder classmate Chen Weiming, who gave it his imprimatur.

== Taiwan ==
Cheng moved to Taiwan in 1949 with the retreating Republican Chinese government. He continued his career as a physician and as a teacher of his new tai chi form, as well as actively practicing painting, poetry, and calligraphy. He published Cheng's 13 Chapters of Tai Chi Boxing in 1950 which has been translated into English twice. He started the Shih Chung T'ai Chi Association in Taipei, where many now well-known students including (Benjamin Lo, Liu Hsi-heng, Hsu I-chung, Qi Jiang Tao, Robert W. Smith, T. T. Liang, William C. C. Chen, Huang Sheng Shyan and others) trained with him.

Though he tended not to advertise it, Cheng served as one of the painting teachers of Soong Mei-ling, Madame Chiang Kai-shek, whom he taught to paint "birds and flowers" style (his colleague Huang Junbi instructed her in landscape painting. Cheng also continued to be a medical advisor to Chiang Kai-shek.

== United States ==
In 1964, Cheng moved with his wife, two sons, and three daughters to the United States, where he taught at the New York T'ai Chi Association at 211 Canal Street in Manhattan. He then founded and taught at the Shr Jung T'ai Chi school at 87 Bowery in New York City's Chinatown section, with the assistance of his six American senior students, known as the "Big Six": Tam Gibbs, Lou Kleinsmith, Ed Young, Mort Raphael, Maggie Newman, and Stanley Israel. Later students/assistants are known as "the Little Six": Victor Chin, Y Y Chin, Jon Gaines, Natasha Gorky, Wolfe Lowenthal, and Ken VanSickle. Other American students include Ed Young, Frank Wong, Michael and Lora Howard, Herman Kauz, René Houtrides, Patt Benton, Lucjan Shila, Carol Yamasaki, Robert Ante, Judyth Weaver, Patrick Watson, Min Pai, Lawrence Galante, Lisa Marcusson, Saul Krotki, Robert Chuckrow, Robert D. Morningstar, Phillip Carter, and William C. Phillips. In Taiwan, Cheng's students continued running the school in his absence. It operated initially under the direction of Liu Hsi-heng. Hsu I-chung is the current director.

While living in New York City, Cheng often spent several hours in the early afternoons studying or teaching classes of three or four students in the C. V. Starr East Asian Library at Columbia University, usually in a small, mahogany-panelled loft above the main floor. For relaxation, he raised orchids.

== Writings ==
Cheng wrote numerous books and articles on a variety of subjects, including commentaries on the I Ching, the Tao Te Ching, the Analects of Confucius, his original works of poetry, essays, medicine, and several art collections.https://chengmanching.wordpress.com/writings./ In 1967 in collaboration with Robert W. Smith, and T. T. Liang, Cheng published "T'ai Chi, the Supreme Ultimate Exercise for Health, Sport and Self-defense," which was his second tai chi book in English. Translations of his works include: "Master Cheng's New Method of T'ai Chi Ch'uan Self-Cultivation"; "Cheng Man Ch'ing: Essays on Man and Culture"; "Cheng Man Ch'ing: Master of Five Excellences," and "T'ai Chi Ch'uan: A Simplified Method of Calisthenics for Health and Self-Defense."

Cheng also produced several tai chi films, and some of his classes and lectures were recorded and in later years released on DVD.

== Tai chi ==
Cheng Man-ch'ing is best known in the West for his tai chi. The following are some of the characteristics of his "Yang-style short form."

- It eliminates most of the repetitions of certain moves of the Yang long form.
- It takes around ten minutes to practice instead of the twenty to thirty minutes of the Yang long form
- The hand and wrist are held open, yet relaxed, in what Cheng called the "Fair Lady's Hand" formation (as opposed to the straighter "Chinese tile" formation of the Yang style)
- The form postures are not as expansive as Yang Chengfu's form
- Cheng postures are performed in "middle frame" style, which changes the movement of the feet from the Yang version.
- Cheng's concept of "swing and return" in which the momentum from one movement initiates the next.

These changes allowed Cheng to teach larger numbers of students in a shorter time. His shortened form became extremely popular in Taiwan and Malaysia, and he was one of the earliest Chinese masters to teach tai chi publicly in the United States. His students have continued to spread his form around the world.

Cheng rejected the appellation "Yang-style Short Form" to characterize his tai chi. When pressed on the issue, he called his form "Yang-style tai chi in 37 Postures." However, the postures in his form are counted differently from those in the Yang Chengfu form. In the older form each movement counts as a posture, whereas in the Cheng form postures are counted only the first time they are performed, and rarely or not at all when they are repeated. These differences in how the postures are counted have led some Cheng practitioners, such as William C. C. Chen, to characterize their own forms as exceeding 70 "movements," and indeed, upon close comparison with the Yang Chengfu form, Cheng's postures, if counted the same way as Yang's are, would number over 70. Moreover, there is nothing in Cheng's teaching to prohibit a practitioner of his style from repeating any number of movements just as many or more times than they are repeated in the Yang Chengfu form.

Cheng's changes to the Yang-style form were not officially recognised by the Yang family and (perhaps partly because of the continued popularity of Cheng's shortened form) his style is still a source of controversy among some tai chi practitioners. From Cheng's own point of view, the approval of his elder brother disciple Chen Weiming was all the recognition he needed, since by that time Yang Chengfu was deceased, and all of the current generation of Yang Chengfu leaders were junior to him.

== Legacy ==
Cheng Man-ch'ing left a legacy mainly in two areas: art and tai chi. In the arts, though he retired in his thirties from teaching, he remained an actively exhibiting artist his whole life, with frequent exhibitions in Taiwan both solo and with his group "Seven Friends of Painting" and solo shows in the United States. After his death, the National Palace Museum in Taiwan held a retrospective exhibit of his works. These were published in Special Exhibition of Painting and Calligraphic Works by Zheng Manqing in 1982. A retrospective exhibit "Zheng Manqing Calligraphy and Painting" was held in his hometown of Wenzhou (Yongjia) in 2017.

Cheng Man-ch'ing's tai chi legacy includes many hundreds of schools around the world that follow his lineage. In Taiwan, a number of his direct students still teach, and the Shih Chung school in Taiwan still operates. Huang Sheng Shyan (Huang Xingxian), one of Cheng's most accomplished disciples, established over 40 schools in South East Asia, through which Cheng's tai chi has continued to reach over 10,000 practitioners. Grandmaster William C. C. Chen continues to teach in New York City.

A little-appreciated dimension of Cheng's legacy was his willingness to teach non-Chinese students. While he was not the first Chinese martial artist to do this in America, his warm embrace of Westerners, who ran the gamut from experienced fighters to long-haired hippies of the day, proved controversial with the Chinese Association that had initially sponsored his move to New York. At one point, when Cheng was out of the country, the Association members locked the Western students out of the Canal Street school. Informed of this, Cheng instructed Ed Young to find a new location. Upon his return to New York, Cheng taught at the new location, 87 Bowery, sending an unmistakable message of inclusiveness and rejecting the insularity that was traditional in the Chinese martial arts community.

In New York City, among Cheng's senior students, Ed Young died September 29, 2023 (aged 91). While Prof. Cheng was teaching in New York, he asked Fred Lehrman to help initiate schools in Milwaukee WI, Minneapolis MN, Gainesville FL, Boulder CO, and Halifax, Nova Scotia. Among these, the ones in Milwaukee and at Naropa Institute in Boulder have continued into the new millennium. The official program at Naropa Institute was initially created by Judyth O. Weaver with the permission of Chögyam Trungpa in 1974. It had over 500 students in the first Tai Chi summer session. From 1975 it included several of the main Shih Jung teachers, including Lehrman, Tam Gibbs, Maggie Newman, Ed Young, and Wolfe Lowenthal as visiting instructors over the next period of years, in addition to resident teachers Jane and Bataan Faigao from 1977. The Faigaos also established Rocky Mountain T'ai Chi Ch'uan in Boulder. The New York School of Tai Chi Chuan, later the T'ai Chi Foundation, was founded by Patrick Watson at the request of Prof. Cheng. William C. Phillips operates Patience T'ai Chi Association in Brooklyn, NY. Don Ahn founded the Ahn T'ai Chi Studio and taught thousands of students form and Taoist techniques. Carol Yamasaki taught hundreds of students in the Detroit area including at the Birmingham Unitarian Church designed by her architect father, Minoru Yamasaki.

Cheng's students carried on his tradition of writing about tai chi, creating tai chi study material, and documenting his teaching. A feature film The Professor: Tai Chi's Journey West documents his years in New York City.

== Notes and references ==
- Cheng Man-ch'ing. See "Zheng Manqing" entry for selected Chinese titles.
- Cheng Man-ch'ing. Cheng Man-ch'ing Videos. (2007). Set of 1960s videos on DVD of Cheng teaching in New York City. Chen Man Ching Index.
- Cheng Man-ch'ing. Cheng-tsu's Thirteen Treatises on T'ai Chi Ch'uan. Translated by Benjamin Lo and Martin Inn. Berkeley: North Atlantic Books (1985).
- Cheng Man-ch'ing; Master Cheng's New Method of T'ai Chi Self-Cultivation, Translated by Mark Hennessy; Frog, Ltd. Books, Berkeley, CA; ISBN 1-883319-92-7 (1999)
- Cheng Man-ch'ing, and Robert W. Smith, T'ai Chi Rutland, VT: Tuttle, 1967.
- Chuckrow, Robert; The Tai Chi Book-Refining and Enjoying a Lifetime of Practice. ISBN 1-886969-64-7. A CMC Shr Jung NYC Student.
- Davis, Barbara; "In Search of a Unified Dao: Zheng Manqing's Life and Contributions to Taijiquan." In Journal of Asian Martial Arts, v.5, n. 2, p. 36-59.
- DeMarco, M. & LaFredo, T. G. (Eds). Cheng Man-ch'ing and T'ai Chi: Echos in the Hall of Happiness. Santa Fe, NM: Via Media Publishing, 2014. ISBN 0615967361
- Kauskas, Jan. Laoshi: Tai Chi, Teachers, and Pursuit of Principle. Santa Fe, NM: Via Media Publishing, 2014. ISBN 9780615967363
- Kauz, Herman; Tai Chi Handbook. ISBN 0-385-09370-5. A CMC Shr Jung NYC Student.
- Lowenthal, Wolfe; There Are No Secrets: Professor Cheng Man-Ch'Ing and His Tai Chi Chuan. ISBN 1-55643-112-0. A CMC Shr Jung NYC Student.
- McFarlane, Stewart The Complete Book of T'ai Chi. DK Publishing, New York (1997). ISBN 0-7894-1476-7, paperback ISBN 0-7894-4259-0. Covers only the 37 Form of Cheng Man-ch'ing's tai chi; illustrated drawings.
- Phillips, William; In the Presence of Cheng Man-Ch’ing: My Life and Lessons with the Master of Five Excellences, Floating World Press, 2020. ISBN 978-0-6482831-2-6
- Strugatz, Barry, director. "The Professor: Tai Chi's Journey West" ASIN B01EU15ZIQ. First Run Features.
- Wile, Douglas. Zheng Manqing's Uncollected Writings on Taijiquan, Qigong, and Health, with New Biographical Notes. Milwaukee: Sweet Ch'i Press, 2007.
- Yang Chengfu. Taijiquan tiyong quanshu. 1934. Translated by Louis Swaim as The Essence and Applications of Taijiquan. 2005. ISBN 1-55643-545-2.
- Yang Zhenji, Yang Chengfu shi taijiquan Guangxi: Guangxi Minzu Chubanshe, 1993.
- Zheng Manqing. Zhengzi taijiquan shisan pian [Cheng-tzu's Thirteen Treatises on T'ai Chi Ch'uan]. Taiwan (1950).
- Zheng Manqing. Taijiquan zixiu xinfa [Master cheng's New Method of T'ai chi ch'uan Self-cultivation]
- Zheng Manqing. Yi quan [The Complete I Ching]. Taipei: Meiya Publishing (1974).
- Zheng Manqing. Zheng Manran shuhua ji [Collection of Zheng Manran's Calligraphy and Painting]. Taipei: Zhonghua shuju (1971).
- "Postures of the Cheng Man-Ching Tai Chi Form". Patience Tai Chi Association. 2007-05-18. Archived from the original on 2015-02-16.
