= Huang Sheng-shyan =

Huang Sheng-shyan 黃性賢
- Born: 1910; Qianyu Village, Jin'an District, Fuzhou, China
- Died: December 21, 1992 (aged 81–82); Fuzhou; Illness
- Other names: Huang Xingxian
- Nationality: Chinese
- Style: Huang-style tai chi Yang-style tai chi Fujian White Crane
- Teacher: Cheng Man-ch'ing

Other information
- Occupation: Martial artist

Huang Sheng-shyan
- Chinese: 黃性賢
Transcriptions
Standard Mandarin
- Hanyu Pinyin: Huáng Xìngxián
- Wade–Giles: Huang Hsing-hsien

Huang Sheng-shyan or Huang Xingxian (1910 – December 1992) was a Chinese martial artist. He was a practitioner and promoter of the art of tai chi.

== Biography ==
He was born in Minhou County, Fujian province in Mainland China. He began studying Fujian White Crane with Xie Zhongxian at the age of 14. In 1947 he resettled in Taiwan where he became a disciple of Cheng Man-ch'ing. Yang Chengfu as the grandson of the Yang style founder, had been Cheng Man-ching’s teacher.

Huang committed himself to this tradition for the next 45 years. In 1955 Huang along with eight fellow students of Cheng Man-ch'ing, represented the Shih Chung Association, in the Provincial Chinese Martial Arts Tournament. Huang was adjudged champion in the tai chi section and runner-up in the open section. Huang emigrated to Singapore in 1956 and in the 1960s moved to Malaysia, both times with the express purpose of propagating taijiquan.

By Robert W. Smith's mediation, Huang fought a challenge match against Donn F. Draeger. Although Huang lost by way of a judo choke, Draeger praised his skill, stating "the man could push, I'll give him that. I must have gone twenty feet back."

At the age of 60, Huang Sheng-shyan again demonstrated his abilities in taijiquan by defeating Liao Kuang-cheng, the Asian champion wrestler, 26 throws to 0 in a fund raising event in Kuching, Malaysia.

By the time of his death in December 1992, he had established 40 schools and taught 10,000 people throughout South East Asia. Huang was considered by some to be the most highly achieved student of Cheng Man-ch'ing. In Robert W. Smith's book, Chinese Boxing: Masters and Methods Smith writes: "[William] Chen probably climbed higher than any of Cheng Man-ch'ing’s students, except the converted White Crane boxer Huang Sheng-hsien (who after learning [tai chi] moved to Singapore and acquired some fame there...)"
