= Hoplology =

Study of human combative behavior and performance

Information
- Founder: Richard Francis Burton
- Key people: Richard Francis Burton; A.H. Pitt Rivers; Donn Draeger; T.J. Obi; Hunter Armstrong; Michael J. Ryan Ph.D.

Hoplology is the study of human combative behavior and performance.

== Etymology and history of the term ==
The word hoplology is derived from the Greek terms "hoplos" (a mythical plate-armored animal) and "ὅπλον hóplon", the equipment carried by some warriors in ancient Greece. The word hoplite, derived from hoplon, is the term for the classical Greek warrior who carried such equipment. The field originated in the 19th century with Sir Richard Burton; although the word is often attributed to him, there are earlier references. Despite the work of Burton and a few others, it was not until the 1960s that hoplology took shape as an academic field of study under the leadership of Donn F. Draeger.

Hoplology was once defined as the science of "arms and weapons of offense and defence, human and bestial" (Burton, 1884), and subsequently as "the study of the basis, patterns, relationships, and significances of combative behavior at all levels of social complexity" (Draeger, 1982).

Sid Campbell, a black belt level, tenth dan-ranked in karate, defines hoplology as "the study of the evolution and development of human combative behaviour and performance — 'the study of how people fight, why they fight, and how different cultures manifest those behaviours.'"

More recently, hoplology is defined as the investigation and analysis of all forms of armed combat. It is most productively seen as an embodied event where the physiological and neurological structures of those individuals taking part in a combative encounter shape and, in turn, are shaped by cultural norms of what is right, effective, and efficient, and so changes over time and across space. As in all human encounters, every combat event is accompanied by a form of material technology and is learned through apprenticeship.

== Warriors, scholars, explorers, and their hoplologies ==
=== 1800s – The accidental hoplologists: Burton & Pitt-Rivers ===
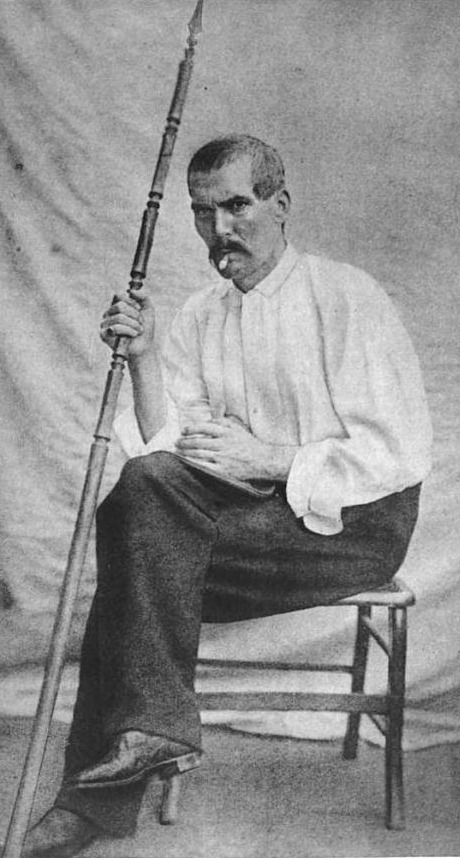
Richard Francis Burton

Several pioneering anthropologists were also contributing to the field of hoplology while Burton was active. A retired military officer who fought in the Crimean War, Augustus Pitt Rivers developed a now-outdated view of human evolution. Cultures, he concluded, evolved through time from technologically simpler societies to technologically complex societies. In other words, progress is an integral aspect of human history. "Primitive Warfare 2." Oxford: The Journal of the Royal United Service Institution Vol. XII 1868 NO. LI. Working in the Trobriand Islands (just off Australia) around the time of WWI, anthropologist Bronisław Malinowski also delved into the field of hoplology.

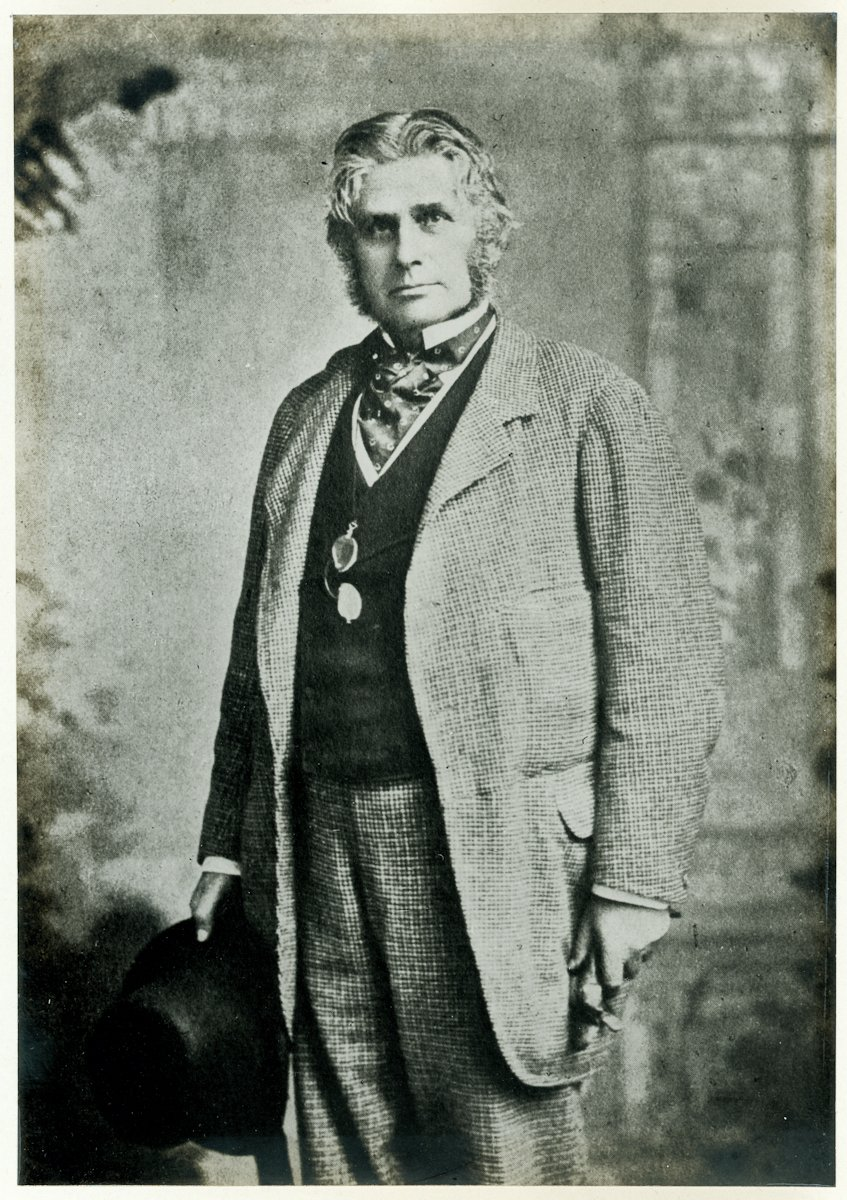
A H Pitt Rivers

Hoplology has always had a theoretical and practical orientation. Seeking to introduce more effective forms of close-quarter combat to British soldiers, Burton wrote two instructional manuals, A Complete System of Bayonet Fighting, and A New System of Sword Exercise for Infantry. In addition, the memoir by the ex-Hussar Francis James Norman, The Fighting Man of Japan: the training and exercise of the samurai, also served as a good resource.

=== 1900s – The surveyors: Malinowski, Banks, Draeger, and Armstrong ===
During the post-WWII era, the International Hoplology Society ("IHS") was established by Major Donn F. Draeger (USMC Ret.) to study the evolution and development of human combative behavior. Draeger had prior research and personal experience with classical fighting systems. Draeger's student and colleague, Hunter B. Armstrong, went on to carry on Draeger's project as director of IHS. He continues to work closely with the military and law enforcement and has been central to the most recent recreation of the Marine Corps Martial Arts Program (MCMAP). Also, during this time, working with Basil Richardson of the Victoria and Albert Museum, Roald Knutsen wrote: "Japanese Spear: Polearms and Their Use in Old Japan" (1963). Here he not only described the morphology of these weapons but explored how they were used by different schools or "ryu.".

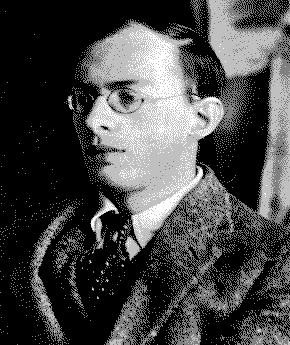
Bronislaw Malinowski

During the 1970s, The Republic of China began some academically based (and often government funded) investigations into several folk combat traditions. One drawback of many of these works is that they have yet to be translated into English, limiting exposure to their findings. In other cases, they were inspired by ethno-nationalist or ideological considerations, and no real effort has been made to engage with the growing international literature on Martial Arts Studies.

Major expeditions

Malinowski, Bronislaw. 1914–1918: Trobriand Islands. An alien enemy on allied land, Malinowski engaged in long-term research of Trobriand culture, including warfare, raiding, inter-village conflict, and war – magic.

Banks, E. 1930s (est.). Sarawak Island, Indonesia. Research on the weapons of the inhabitants of Sarawak.

Draeger, Donn. 1979. Sumatra, Draeger, and his team visited the island of Sumatra. While visiting the Aceh tribe there, it appears that the entire group was somehow poisoned, perhaps deliberately.

==== Overview of Draeger-IHS approach to hoplology ====
Hoplology (as professed by Draeger-IHS) has three main research areas: technological, functional, and behavioral.

- Technological hoplology studies the development of weapons, armor, and other combative tools in relation to the contexts in which they are created.
- Functional hoplology delves into the structure, development, and organization of combative systems and their relationship to the application of fighting and weapons.
- Behavioral hoplology encompasses the psychological and physiological factors that affect humans' combative behavior and the development of combative capabilities, such as weapons or fighting systems. The broad subject range of behavioral hoplology means it also includes the effects that culture has had on man's evolution as a group-social animal.

There are three IHS axioms in hoplological studies.

- human combative behavior is rooted in man's evolution.
- humans exhibit two types of aggression: affective aggression and predatory aggression. Both forms evolved from different survival needs, both as a group-social animal and as a hunting animal.
- the evolution of human combative behavior is directly linked to the use of weapons. That is to say, the use of weapons is linked to and reflects combative performance and behavior.

A variation on the pragmatics of hoplological understanding is found in theatrical representations of combat.

The Draeger-IHS hoplological view on violence: The entrenched nature of violence in human behavior is generally well understood. The skill and potential for deadly aggression are something within human genetics that predisposes humans to violent behavior. However, the genetics that predispose humans to violence are highly influenced by environmental factors. Humans will only tap into their violent potential when the need arises. Human genetics has developed an on-off switch in the brain. On the one side, "…the fighting activity itself is stimulated by individual and communal thrill, enjoyment in the competitive exercise of spiritual and physical faculties, and even cruelty, blood lust, and killing ecstasy." (Gat 2006) On the offside, violence is deterred away by emotions through fear, revulsion at violence and bloodshed, physical fatigue, compassion, and spirituality. So if the environmental factors that cause a man to be violent are present, then he will be violent. If the environmental factors that cause a man to be violent are not present, he will abstain from violence.
