= Tiger Cage (film) =

1988 Hong Kong film by Yuen Woo-ping

- Theatrical release poster
- Traditional Chinese: 特警屠龍
- Simplified Chinese: 特警屠龙
- Hanyu Pinyin: Tè Jǐng Tú Lóng
- Jyutping: Dak6 Ging2 Tou4 Lung4
- Directed by: Yuen Woo-ping
- Screenplay by: Anthony Wong; Kim Yip
- Produced by: Stephen Shin
- Starring: Simon Yam; Carol Cheng; Jacky Cheung; Irene Wan; Donnie Yen; Bryan Leung; Ng Man-tat; Wang Lung-wei
- Cinematography: Lee Kin-keung; Chan Man-to
- Edited by: Lee Yim-hoi; Chan Kei-hop; Kwong Chi-leung; Cheung Kwok-kuen
- Music by: Donald Ashley; Norman Wong
- Production company: D&B Films
- Release date: 28 July 1988
- Running time: 89 minutes
- Country: Hong Kong
- Language: Cantonese
- Box office: HK$11,534,315

Tiger Cage is a 1988 Hong Kong action film directed by Yuen Woo-ping and starring Simon Yam, Carol Cheng, Jacky Cheung, Irene Wan and Donnie Yen. The film was followed by a sequel, Tiger Cage 2, released two years later in 1990 featuring a new storyline, with Yuen returning as director and cast members Yen and Cheng returning in different roles.

== Plot ==
Inspector Michael Huang, alongside Shirley Ho, Brother Lung, Fan Chun-yau, Uncle Tat and Terry are all part of the Anti-Drug Unit of the Royal Hong Kong Police Force. The relationship between them are like brothers in general. During an operation, they worked together to bust a drug den but the chief drug trafficker, Swatow Hung, escaped. Just as they were celebrating their success, Hung found them and killed Lung. In order to avenge Lung and find Hung, they took a variety of means and finally found and killed Hung. During an accident, Yau filmed Tat trading with a drug trafficker and tells Terry and Michael. After Michael found out, in order to protect himself, he killed Terry and framed Yau, who was then suspended from duty, which caused Yau to feel suspicious.

One day, Yau's girlfriend Amy found a copy of Yau's videotape at home and discovered that Michael and Tat were accomplices. Shortly after Yau and Michael arrive to pick up the tape, but in order to save Yau, she handed the tape to Michael. Michael then ordered an assassin to kill her. But Amy was able to call Shirley and inform her of Michael's operations. At this point, Yau and Shirley discover the truth to everything, that Hung luckily escaped from the drug bust earlier and came back to revenge on Lung, who was an undercover cop, on the night before his wedding with Shirley. Yau vows to bring the perpetrator to justice and dig out the mole inside the police force. Terry, who was partners with Tat, discovered his relationship with the drug traffickers and conflicted for his loyalty to Tat or his ethnic standards. Tat was used by his superior Michael and was ultimately abandoned and killed. Shirley finally discovers the truth to the case, but now, it is difficult for all of them to escape death.

== Cast ==
- Simon Yam as Michael Huang
- Carol Cheng as Shirley Ho Shih-ling, a policewoman whose fiancé was murdered by the drug traffickers
- Jacky Cheung as Fang Shun-yu
- Irene Wan as Amy
- Donnie Yen as Terry
- Bryan Leung as Brother Lung
- Ng Man-tat as Uncle Tat
- Wang Lung-wei as Swatow Hung
- Vincent Lyn as Vincent
- Yuen Shun-yi as Hung's brother
- Yuen Cheung-yan as Policeman
- Michael Woods as Drug dealer from USA
- Paul Wong as Man gets kicked in drug bust
- Chan King as Policeman
- Yuen Woo-ping as Master Eight
- Fung Hak-on as Hung's buddy
- Stephan Berwick as Drug dealer from USA
- Wai Kei-shun as Officer Wai
- Peter Mak as Policeman
- Jameson Lam as Policeman at Lung's party
- Chang Sing-kwong
- Lam Foo-wai as Mechanic
- Fei Pak as Policeman at Lung's funeral

== Box office ==
The film earned HK$11,534,315 at the Hong Kong box office during its theatrical run from 28 July to 10 August 1988 in Hong Kong.
