= Robert W. Smith (writer) =

American martial artist and writer

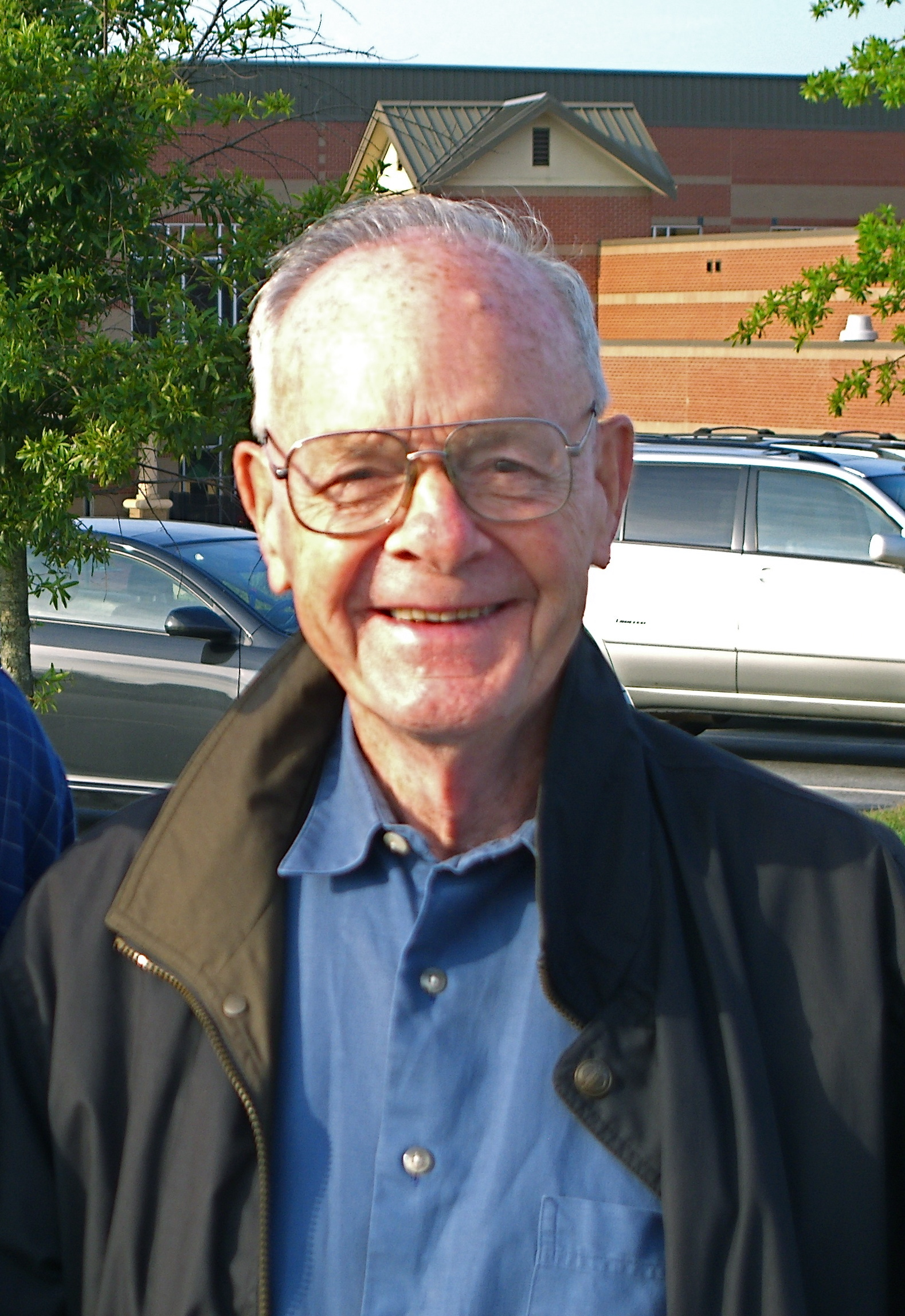

Robert William Smith (December 27, 1926 – July 1, 2011) was an American martial artist and writer, most noted for his prodigious output of books and articles about the Asian martial arts and their masters. Smith's writing was an important factor in the spread of Asian martial arts such as judo, baguazhang, xingyiquan, and tai chi in the postwar United States.

== Early life ==
Born on a farm in Iowa in 1926, he was sent at the age of three to an orphanage due to his family's economic distress. There he became a voracious reader. In high school, he learned boxing and wrestling. He joined the U.S. Marines at seventeen. While in the Marines, Smith completed his high school requirements through a correspondence course. He was honorably discharged in 1946. Smith attended college on the G.I. Bill, eventually earning an M.A. in History from the University of Washington in 1953. Smith's interest in boxing and pursuit of Asian martial arts (especially judo) continued unabated. After a brief stint with the Red Cross, Smith joined the U.S. Central Intelligence Agency as an intelligence officer and moved to Bethesda, Maryland.

== Taiwan ==
From 1959 to 1962 he was posted by the CIA to Taiwan. The Republican Chinese government led by Chiang Kai-shek had fled to Taiwan (Formosa) after the victory of Mao Zedong and the Communists on the mainland in 1949. Protected by the U.S. Seventh Fleet, Taiwan became the seat of government for the Republic of China - the only Chinese government diplomatically recognized by the U.S. Government until the 1970s. Smith worked as a liaison to the Republican government.

While in Taiwan Smith trained and studied with many masters of Chinese martial arts (e.g., baguazhang, xingyiquan). Most importantly, he met Professor Cheng Man-ch'ing, the "master of five excellences" - calligraphy, poetry, painting, Chinese medicine, and tai chi. Legend has it that Smith had to keep knocking on Cheng's door for at least six months before Cheng would accept him as his first non-Chinese student. While waiting to study with Cheng, Smith studied with T.T. Liang. Cheng and his students would meet every Sunday in Taiwan for tai chi and pushing hands (tuishou, which Smith often preferred to translate as "sensing hands"). Cheng moved to the United States in the mid-1960s and lived and taught in New York City for a number of years before returning to Taiwan in the mid-1970s. Smith and Cheng kept in close contact until Cheng's death in 1975.

== America ==
Smith returned to Bethesda in 1962 and initially taught judo at the local YMCA, but later concentrated on tai chi, baguazhang, and xingyiquan. Starting in 1962, Smith taught a popular free early Saturday morning tai chi class at the YMCA. This continued for 26 years. During those years he worked, raised a family, taught, and wrote about martial arts. Smith retired from teaching in late 1988 and he and his wife Alice moved to the foothills of the Smoky Mountains.

Over the years Smith befriended many boxers and martial artists and sought many teachers. He was driven by a friendly curiosity that evolved over time into an expertise on Asian martial arts. He was one of the first western writers to introduce Asian martial arts to the West.

== Smith's writings ==
Beginning in the 1950s, Smith wrote articles for such martial arts magazines as Budokwai Quarterly Bulletin, Judo, Strength and Health, Black Belt, and the Journal of Asian Martial Arts, and served on the editorial board for Taijiquan Journal. Smith's articles whetted the appetite of the American martial arts community, which paved the way for Asian masters to then develop followings in the US.

Always written with a flair, Smith's numerous books and articles offer martial techniques, history, anecdotes, opinions, humor, and quotes from his wide-ranging personal training, research, and reading. Smith collaborated with his teacher Cheng Man-ch'ing on one of the earliest English tai chi books (T'ai Chi, Tuttle, 1967), and with Benjamin Lo on a translation of one of the earliest tai chi books: Chen Weiming's 1929 book T'ai chi ch'uan ta wen—Questions and Answers on T'ai Chi Ch'uan (North Atlantic, 1985). With his student Allen Pittman, Smith later wrote two further Tuttle volumes, Hsing-I: Chinese Internal Boxing and Pa-Kua: Eight-Trigram Boxing (both 1990), reissued together in 2006 as Chinese Internal Boxing: Techniques of Hsing-i and Pa-kua. Smith's memoir, "Martial Musings" (1999) was written much as he taught tai chi, i.e., with multiple anecdotal stories and a sharp sense of humor. He wrote, co-wrote, edited, co-edited and co-translated fifteen books on the martial arts and over twenty articles with a particular focus on the internal, martial arts of China.

He also wrote three books under the nom de plume of John F. Gilbey. "Gilbey's" first book, Secret Fighting Arts of the World, was a work of fiction parodying various martial arts tall tales, but was widely assumed to be non-fiction when it was first released. The second Gilbey book, The Way of a Warrior, was effectively a sequel to Secret Fighting Arts and the third, Western Boxing and World Wrestling, was a largely non-fictional compilation of boxing and wrestling anecdotes. Smith edited the first book in English on Shaolin Temple boxing. In addition, he wrote the first books in English on baguazhang and xingyiquan, as well as the above-mentioned one on tai chi. Smith thus, was a key figure in introducing Western readers to these three "internal" martial arts of China.

From 1974 to 1994, Smith also wrote book reviews on literary subjects for newspapers including The Washington Post, the Chicago Sun-Times, and The Guardian. In 1983 The Washington Post Magazine described him as "recognized as an international expert on hand-to-hand combat".

== "Quotations from Chairman Smith," Sayings lovingly recollected by former students - circa 1978 to 1985 ==
“PRACTICE, PRACTICE, PRACTICE .... “

“Tai Chi is like swimming in air.” Quoting Cheng Man-ch'ing 's “Thirteen Treatises.” Treatise Five

“This is the Marine Corps school of T'ai Chi.” Said jokingly while students were holding tough postures.

“You may hate me now, but you’ll thank me later.” Implying that our workouts in class would lead to better relaxation and sleep later.

“It takes at least five years of practicing T'ai Chi to realize you know nothing.”

“In T'ai Chi, three factors are very important: correct teaching, perseverance and natural talent. Of the three, correct teaching (or right method) is the most important.” From "T'ai Chi" by Cheng and Smith, page 8

“When you’re relaxed, you are your true self.” He suggested, for example to “always remember moments such as sitting on the beach, watching and listening to the waves, and being totally relaxed.”

“Don’t underestimate a street fighter. First, you shouldn’t be in that part of town to begin with. Second, don’t ever let them get you off your feet. If they do (get you off your feet), the last thing you know, a foot will be coming for your head.”

“Don’t forget that scene in ‘Raiders of the Lost Ark’ when the guy waves the sword around in the air and Indiana Jones pulls out his gun and shoots him. Remember, no man can outrun a bullet.”

“Push from the center.”

“If you stay in the quiet standing position long enough, you will feel ch'i.”

“If you exercise, make sure you do it consistently, whether twice a day or twice a week.”

“Go without sleep, go without food, but do not go without T'ai Chi."

"The Cross wasn't a lounge chair."

"I never saw a smiling jogger."

== Selected bibliography ==
- Chen Weiming. T'ai Chi Ch'uan Ta Wen: Questions and Answers on T'ai Chi Ch'uan, Lo, Benjamin and Robert W. Smith, translators. (1929; translation North Atlantic, 1985) ISBN 0-938190-67-9.
- Cheng Man-ch'ing and Robert W. Smith. T'ai Chi. 1967. ISBN 0-8048-0560-1.
- Draeger, Donn and Robert W. Smith. Asian Fighting Arts, Kodansha International, 1969; re-titled Comprehensive Asian Fighting Arts upon republication, 1980 (ISBN 978-0-87011-436-6).
- Gilbey, John (Robert W. Smith). Secret Fighting Arts of the World. (Tuttle, 1963).
- Gilbey, John. "The Way of a Warrior," (Richmond, CA: North Atlantic Books, 1982).
- Gilbey, John (Robert W. Smith). Western Boxing and World Wrestling: Story and Practice. (North Atlantic Books, 1986).
- Guterman, A. and Robert W. Smith. "Neurological Sequalae of Boxing." Sports Medicine, 4:3 (1987), 194–210.
- Mason, Russ. "Fifty Years in the Fighting Arts: An Interview with Robert W. Smith," Journal of Asian Martial Arts, 10:1 (2001), 36–73.
- Martial Arts: The Real Story (Pacific Street Films, 2000). First broadcast on The Learning Channel, July 7, 2000.
- Smith, Robert W. Chinese Boxing: Masters and Methods. 1974, 1990. ISBN 1-55643-085-X.
- Smith, Robert W. Pa-kua: Chinese Boxing for Fitness and Self-Defense. (Kodansha International, 1967).
- Smith, Robert W. Hsing-I: Chinese Mind-Body Boxing. (Kodansha International, 1974).
- Smith, Robert W. and Allen Pittman. Hsing-I: Chinese Internal Boxing. (Tuttle, 1990) ISBN 978-0-8048-1617-5.
- Smith, Robert W. and Allen Pittman. Pa-Kua: Eight-Trigram Boxing. (Tuttle, 1990) ISBN 978-0-8048-1618-2.
- Smith, Robert W. and Allen Pittman. Chinese Internal Boxing: Techniques of Hsing-i and Pa-kua (combined edition). (Tuttle, 2006) ISBN 978-0-8048-3824-5.
- Smith, Robert W. Martial Musings: A Portrayal of Martial Arts in the 20th Century. (Erie, PA: Media Publishing, 1999).
- --- A Complete Guide to Judo: Its Story and Practice. (Tuttle, 1958).
- --- A Bibliography of Judo and Other Self-Defense Systems Including Cognate Works and Articles. (Tuttle, 1959).
- ---"Donn Draeger--A Lifelong Embodiment of the Samurai Code." Journal of Asian Martial Arts, 8:3 (1999), 18–33.
- ---Martial Musings. 1999. ISBN 1-893765-00-8.
- ---Secrets of Shaolin Temple Boxing. (Tuttle, 1964).

== See also ==
- Cheng Man-ch'ing
- Donn F. Draeger
- Dong Haichuan
- Manuel Velazquez
- Gulam
- Chen Weiming (scholar)
- Ernest John Harrison
