= Don Ahn =

South Korean artist (1937–2013)

Dongkuk Ahn
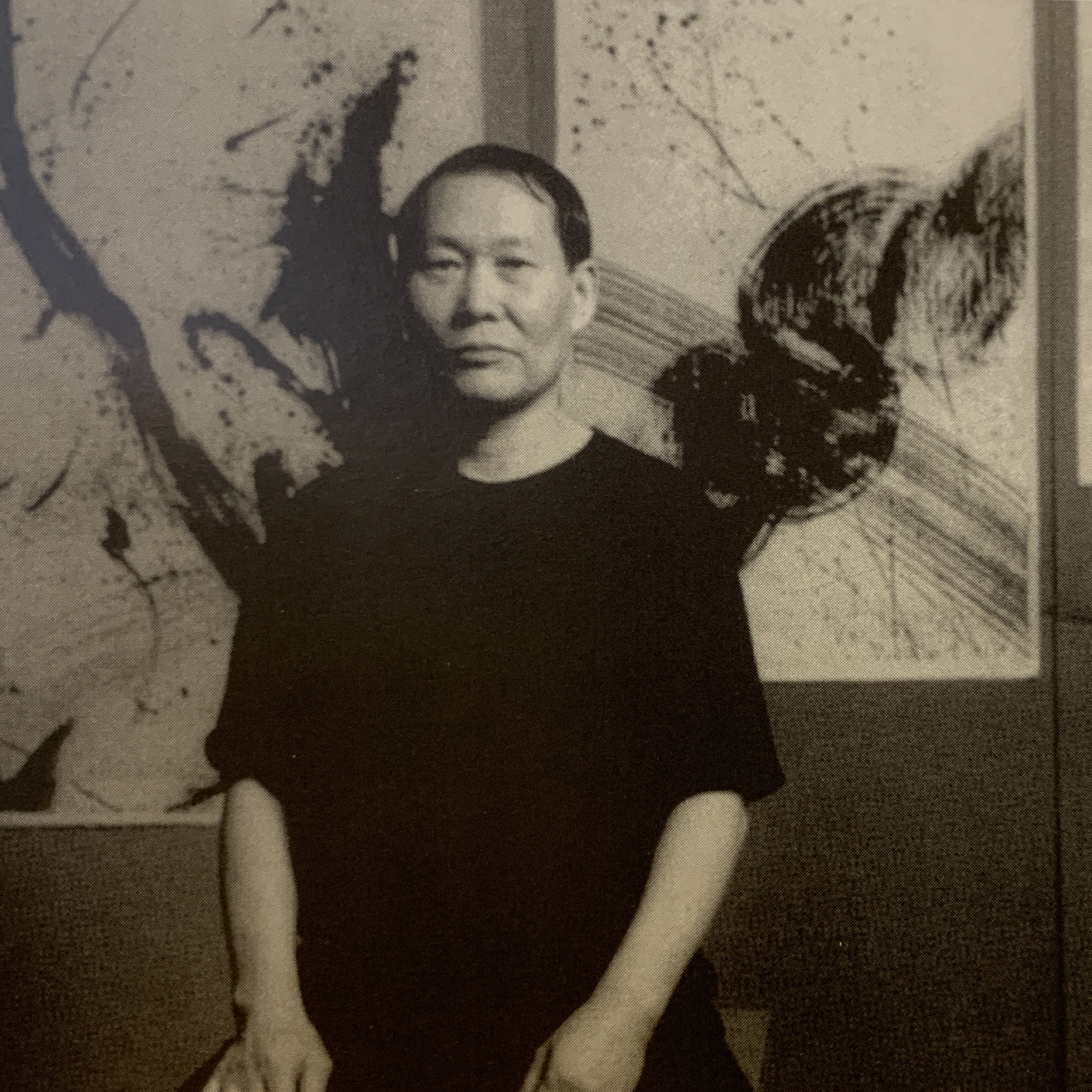
- Born: 1937; Seoul, Korea
- Died: 2013 (aged 75–76)
- Education: Seoul University (BFA), Miami University, Oxford (Graduate studies), Pratt Institute (MFA), New York University (Ph.D., Art History)
- Known for: Painting, Tai Chi
- Notable work: Broken Branch in the Rain, Old Zen Tree, Wind, Rain, & Ocean, Brown Dragon, Yellow Dragon
- Movement: Abstract expressionism, Zen-inspired art
- Awards: Dayton Art Museum Ohio Regional Art Annual First Prize (1963), East Coast Printmaker’s Annual First Prize (1964), McDowell Artist Fellowship (1964)

Dongkuk Ahn (Daw-non) (1937–2013), also known as Don Ahn, was a South Korean artist and tai chi master who resided in New York City.

== Biography ==
Don Ahn was born in Seoul, Korea. He studied at Seoul University (BFA), was a graduate student at Miami University, Oxford, Ohio, in 1962, Pratt Institute (MFA), and New York University (Ph.D., Art History). He was also a student of the tai chi grandmaster Cheng Man-ch'ing in New York City.

== Careers ==
=== As an artist ===
Ahn's ink and acrylic paintings are influenced by the cycles of nature, as in Zen and other Eastern philosophies. His works have an abstract expressionist. The titles of his paintings reference trees, wind, and water and include Broken Branch in the Rain, Old Zen Tree, and Wind, Rain, & Ocean. Another influence in Ahn's work is the dragon from Korean and Chinese mythology. Ahn's paintings have titles such as Brown Dragon and Yellow Dragon and Phantasy in the Deep Sea.

In his catalog essay, Jeffrey Wechsler remarks at "how completely even the most explosive of (the marks) ultimately resolve within the paintings as compositional pivots and focal points of visual weight, but without reducing their sense of unbound energy" which he calls a "zen-like paradox". The white paper background in his works is said to not be characteristic of Western negative space; he believed that the space is full of Tao (the fullness of existence) and ch'i (the energy within it).

==== Exhibitions ====
Ahn has had numerous solo and group exhibitions in the U.S. and abroad, including the solo shows Dragons & Oceans at Ehwa Gallery, Seoul, South Korea, in 2007, and Zen & Void at Walter Wickiser Gallery, New York, in 2004. His work is in private and public collections, including the Museum of Modern Art in New York, the Dayton Art Museum in Ohio, and the Evansville Museum in Indiana.

Awards and honors include the First Prize (in painting) from the Dayton Art Museum Ohio Regional Art Annual in 1963, the Pratt Graduate Fellowship in 1963, the First Prize (in etching) from East Coast Printmaker's Annual in 1964, and the McDowell Artist Fellowship in 1964.

=== As a tai chi master ===
Ahn studied with the late Professor Cheng Man-ch'ing for 6 years starting in 1964, followed by study under Yang Shouzhong (the eldest son of Yang Chengfu) in Hong Kong. He teaches several Taoist disciplines: he has trained in Korean taekwondo (1949–1953), Korean Zen (1955–1959), and has practiced other Taoist disciplines for over 30 years. Ahn learned acupressure techniques in his childhood from his grandfather and studied Korean and Japanese Shiatsu intermittently in 1953.

He was known for his focus on dantian and taught Professor Cheng's 37-form, as well as push hands, double knives, Da Lu, Wu Chi breathing, and Taoist meditation.
