= Manuel Velazquez =

American anti-boxing activist (1904–1994)

Manuel Velazquez (December 6, 1904 – January 1994) was an American anti-boxing activist who kept meticulous files on boxing-related deaths.

== Early life ==
Manuel Velazquez was born in Tampa, Florida. When Velazquez was about 10 years old, he and his family moved to Chicago, Illinois. At 15, he dropped out of school and began work at a railroad roundhouse in Oak Park, Illinois. At 19, he joined the Illinois National Guard, Company F, 131st Infantry. He served from 1924–1925, then moved back to Tampa and worked on a trolley car.

== Association with boxing ==
In Tampa, Velazquez befriended middleweight boxer Manuel Quintero and consequently spent significant time in the gym. In 1927, Velazquez moved to New York City and worked on a trolley on Sixth Avenue in Manhattan and then as a conductor on the New York City Subway system. During his time in New York, he befriended boxer and fellow Floridian Pete Nebo.

Nebo retired at 27 and moved to Key West, Florida, where he was arrested in 1938 for assaulting a man who called him "punchy." The court determined that Nebo was mentally incompetent due to boxing injuries, and on September 1 he was involuntarily committed to Florida State Hospital at Chattahoochie.

Velazquez subsequently began collecting data on boxing injuries, and as a result of what he learned he began to oppose the sport.

== Later life ==
In 1938, he had to quit his subway job due to multiple sclerosis. The disease forced him to use a cane starting in 1939. Still, he continued to work, finding employment in the Federal civil service in 1940. This job took him around the country, including stops in New York City, St. Louis, Missouri, Arlington, Virginia and Fort Benjamin Harrison.

After his retirement in 1959, Velazquez lived in government-subsidized housing in Tampa. Later he moved to Arizona, and finally to Greenville, Illinois where he died at the age of 89.

== Legacy ==
Shortly before his death, Velazquez sent his files to Robert W. Smith, who, along with Andrew Guterman, had written an article called "Neurological Sequalae of Boxing," published in the journal Sports Medicine (4 [1987], 194-210). The collection passed to Joseph R. Svinth in the mid-1990s. Svinth maintains an ongoing project called "Death Under the Spotlight: The Manuel Velazquez Boxing Fatality Collection," which documents "Western" boxing deaths since 1741.
