= Accor Arena =

Indoor sports arena and concert hall in Paris, France

- Paris-Bercy

- Interactive map of Accor Arena
- Former names: Palais Omnisports de Paris-Bercy (1984–2014); Bercy Arena (2014–2015); AccorHotels Arena (2015–2020)
- Address: 8 Boulevard de Bercy
- Location: Paris, Île-de-France, France
- Coordinates: 48°50′19″N 2°22′43″E
- Owner: Ville de Paris
- Operator: SEM du Palais Omnisports de Paris-Bercy
- Capacity: Concerts: 20,300; Boxing: 16,394; Tennis: 15,609; Handball: 15,609; Basketball: 15,609; Ice Hockey: 13,877; Athletics: 10,910
- Surface: Versatile
- Public transit: Bercy

Construction
- Groundbreaking: February 1981
- Opened: 3 February 1984
- Renovated: 2014–2015
- Architects: Andrault & Parat; Jean Prouvé; Aydin Guvan

Website
- accorarena.com

Accor Arena (originally known as the Palais Omnisports de Paris-Bercy), also known as Bercy Arena, is a multi-purpose indoor arena in Paris, France. It lies in the neighbourhood of Bercy, on the Boulevard de Bercy, in the 12th arrondissement of Paris. The closest Paris Métro station is Bercy, which also serves the Finance Ministry. The second largest indoor arena in France after the Plenitude Arena, it mainly hosts sporting events and concerts, and can accommodate up to 20,300 people.

Designed by the architectural firm Andrault-Parat, Jean Prouvé and Aydin Guvan, the pyramidal arena's sloping walls are covered with a lawn.

The arena was renamed Bercy Arena after renovations on 1 January 2015, AccorHotels Arena in October 2015, and given its current name in June 2020.

Since 1985, the arena hosts the annual Festival des Arts Martiaux. The 38th Festival des Arts Martiaux was held in March 2025.

== Events ==
=== Sports ===
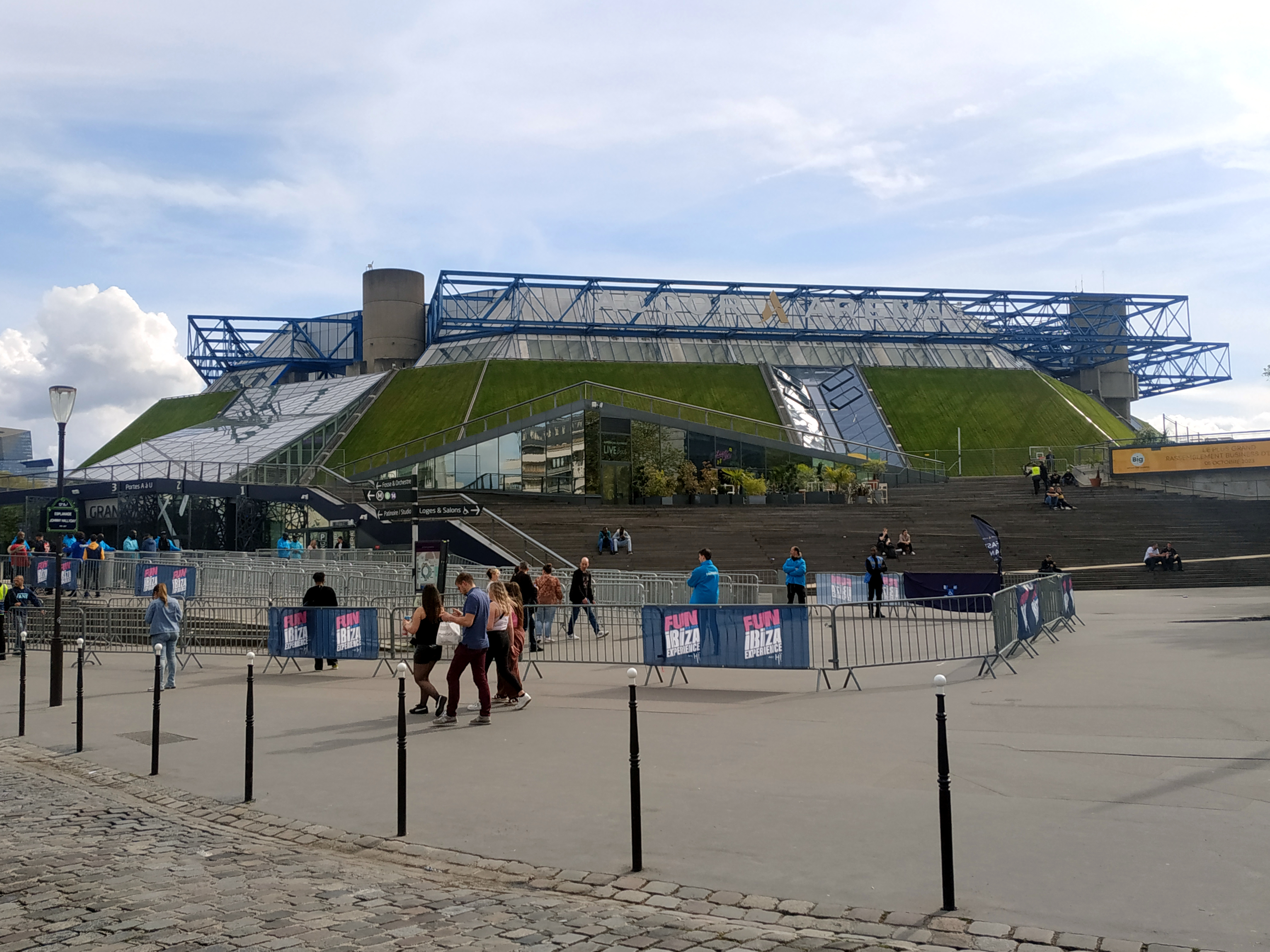
The arena in April 2023

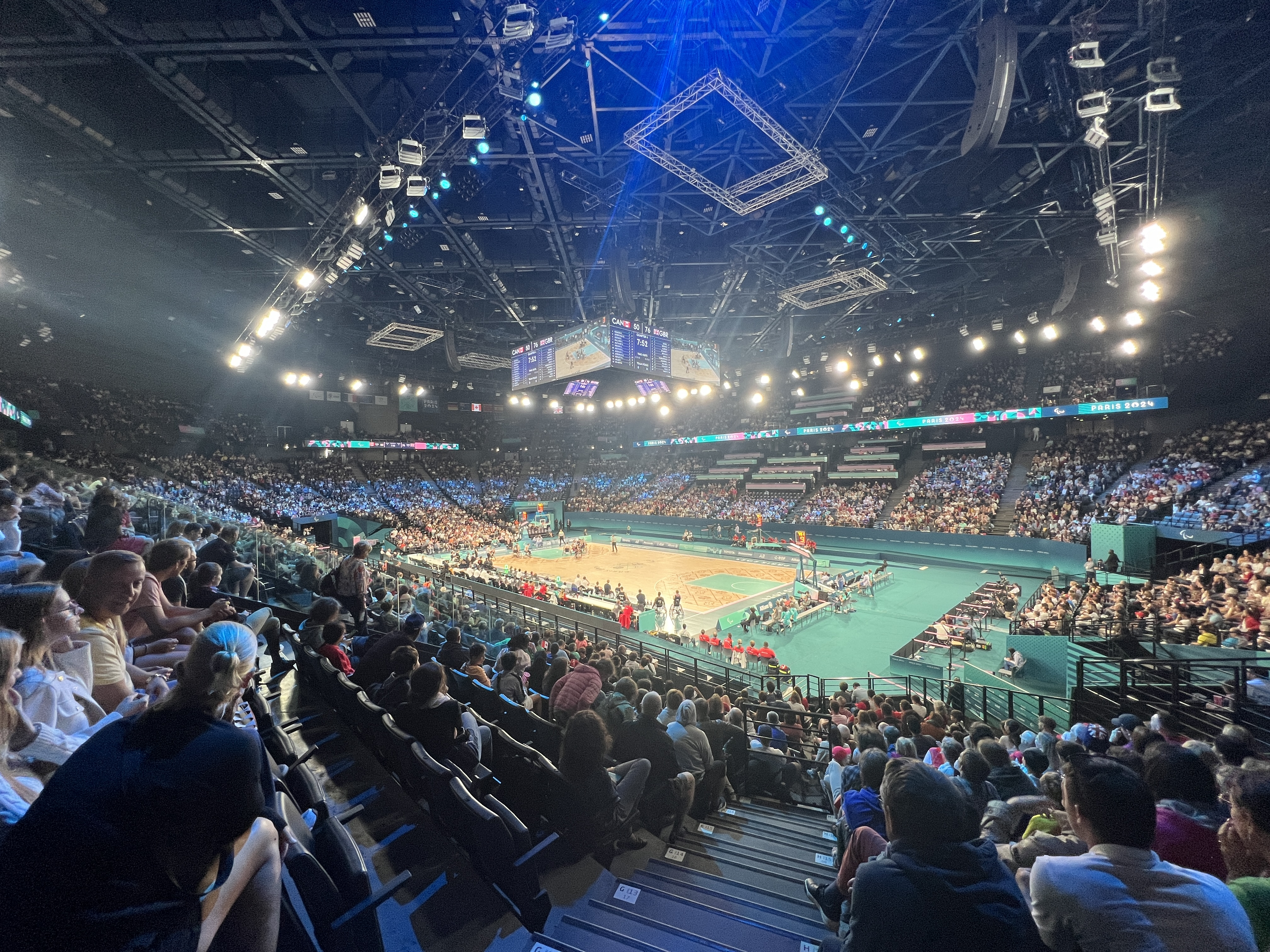
The arena during the 2024 Summer Paralympics

The Accor Arena was until 2024 the main venue for the Paris Masters ATP Tour tennis tournament, and hosts the annual LNB All-Star Game basketball event and the Grand Slam Paris judo tournament. It is also used for many other sports events, such as table tennis, handball, basketball, boxing, gymnastics, track cycling and show jumping.

Since 1985, the Accor Arena hosts the annual Festival des Arts Martiaux. The event was founded by Karaté Bushido and showcases martial arts masters from around the world.

From 1993 to 2011, the arena hosted the Masters of Paris-Bercy, a all-star kart racing competition frequently contested by Formula One drivers and world champions in other auto racing disciplines. The inaugural 1993 edition marked the last duel on the track between Formula One World Drivers' Champions Alain Prost and Ayrton Senna.

POPB (Palais Omnisports de Paris-Bercy) hosted the European gymnastics championship in 2000, the 1991 and 1996 FIBA EuroLeague Final Fours, and the FIBA EuroBasket championship in 1999, among others. It also hosted the 2009–10 EuroLeague Final Four. It was co-host of the 2017 IIHF World Championship and the FIBA Women's EuroBasket 2021. The venue is set to host the 2031 FIBA Basketball World Cup.

On 24 January 2020, it hosted an NBA regular season game between the Milwaukee Bucks and Charlotte Hornets, who would be represented by Frenchman Nicolas Batum. The Chicago Bulls beat the Detroit Pistons 126–108 at the arena on 19 January 2023, during the 2022–23 NBA season. The 2023–24 NBA season saw the Cleveland Cavaliers defeat the Brooklyn Nets 111–102 at the arena on 11 January 2024. The 2024–25 NBA season saw two games between the Indiana Pacers and San Antonio Spurs on 23 and 25 January, with the games coming after the Spurs signed French star Victor Wembanyama. The 2026–27 NBA season will once again see the San Antonio Spurs return on 14 January 2027 to face the New Orleans Pelicans.

Paris Basketball also host some occasional LNB Élite and EuroLeague games if Adidas Arena is unavailable to use due to other sporting events and entertainment events.

The arena hosted France's first UFC event on 3 September 2022, for UFC Fight Night: Gane vs. Tuivasa. UFC returned to the arena on 2 September 2023 for UFC Fight Night: Gane vs. Spivac. The promotion returned to the arena in 2024 for UFC Fight Night: Moicano vs. Saint Denis. The UFC returned to Accor Arena for the fourth straight year to host UFC Fight Night: Imavov vs. Borralho in 2025. The arena held another UFC event for the fifth straight year, hosting UFC Fight Night: Hooker vs. Parnasse in 2026.

The arena was a venue for the 2024 Summer Olympics, hosting the artistic and trampoline gymnastics events, followed by the basketball bronze and gold medal games for both genders. Due to Olympic rules regarding naming rights of venues, the venue temporarily reverted its name to Bercy Arena.

At the 2024 Summer Paralympics, the arena was the venue for all of the Wheelchair basketball matches.

Women's Wheelchair Basketball game at the 2024 Paralympics, between Germany and Canada	Spectators watching the Gymnastics event at the 2024 Summer Olympics

=== Concerts ===
The arena is one of the main concert venues in Paris.

The inaugural concert was given by L'Orchestre de Paris on 17 February 1984, when Lorin Maazel conducted the orchestra and massed choirs in a performance of Berlioz's Grande Messe des Morts. British rock band Queen performed at Bercy in 1984. George Michael performed two shows from The Faith Tour there in 1988, as did Norwegian band A-ha. Among those who have performed there the most are French rock singer Johnny Hallyday with 93 solo concerts from 1987 to 2016 and eight concerts with the group Les vieilles canailles, totaling 101 performances; French singer-songwriter Michel Sardou with 91 concerts from 1989 to 2012; French entertainer Dorothée with 56 concerts from 1990 to 1996 and another in 2010; Canadian singer Celine Dion with 35 concerts from 1995 to 2017; Canadian-born French singer Mylène Farmer with 33 concerts from 1989 to 2013; and American singer-songwriter Madonna with 25 concerts from 1990 to 2023. French electronic music duo Daft Punk performer and recorded their performance for Alive 2007 at Bercy. Beyoncé, as a solo artist, performed at Bercy in 2007, 2009, and 2013 as part of her tours The Beyoncé Experience, I Am... Tour and The Mrs Carter Show World Tour. Linkin Park performed at the venue on 30 May 2007, as part of the Minutes to Midnight World Tour, and again on 25 October 2010, as part of the A Thousand Suns World Tour. Barbadian singer Rihanna performed at Bercy in 2009 and 2011 for her second and third world tour "Last Girl on Earth" and "Loud Tour". German band Rammstein recorded their performance for Rammstein: Paris at Bercy. American singer Lady Gaga performed a total of 9 shows at Bercy. In 2010 for her Monster Ball with 4 shows, in November 2014 as part of her ArtRave: The Artpop Ball marking the last show of that tour, and in November 2025 for her Mayhem Ball with 4 shows. American rock band My Chemical Romance performed at Bercy in June 2022 as part of their Reunion Tour. Congolese artists who have performed at Bercy include Koffi Olomidé, Papa Wemba, Werrason, JB Mpiana, and Fally Ipupa.

=== E-Sports ===
The arena hosted the 2017 European League of Legends Championship Series Summer Finals and the 2019 League of Legends World Championship Finals.

In May 2023, the arena hosted the BLAST.tv Major for the video game Counter-Strike: Global Offensive, in what would be the final major played on Global Offensive before Counter-Strike 2 was released in September 2023.

Riot Games hosted the top-four matches of Valorant Champions 2025. in Accor Arena.

In July 2026, it was announced that the arena will host the finals of the 2026 Esports World Cup Counter-Strike 2 tournament.

== See also ==
- List of tennis stadiums by capacity
- List of indoor arenas in France
- Wine warehouses of Bercy

Preceded by First Venue	IAAF World Indoor Championships in Athletics; Venue; 1985	Succeeded by Hoosier Dome; Indianapolis
Preceded by Estadio Luna Park; Buenos Aires	FIVB Volleyball Men's World Championship; Final Venue; 1986	Succeeded by Ginásio do Maracanãzinho; Rio de Janeiro
Preceded by Budapest Sportcsarnok, Budapest	World Figure Skating Championships; Venue; 1989	Succeeded by Halifax Metro Centre, Halifax
Preceded by Pabellón Príncipe Felipe; Zaragoza	FIBA European Championship; Final Four; Venue; 1991	Succeeded by Abdi Ipekçi Arena; Istanbul
Preceded by Palasport di Genoa; Genoa	European Indoor Championships in Athletics; Venue; 1994	Succeeded by Globen Arena; Stockholm
Preceded by Pabellón Príncipe Felipe; Zaragoza	FIBA European Championship; Final Four; Venue; 1996	Succeeded by PalaEur; Rome
Preceded by Palau Sant Jordi; Barcelona	IAAF World Indoor Championships in Athletics; Venue; 1997	Succeeded by Green Dome Maebashi; Maebashi
Preceded by Palau Sant Jordi; Barcelona	FIBA EuroBasket; Final Venue; 1999	Succeeded by Abdi Ipekçi Arena; Istanbul
Preceded by Cairo Stadium Hall 1 Cairo	World Men's Handball Championship; Final Venue; 2001	Succeeded by Pavilhão Atlântico; Lisbon
Preceded by PAOK Sports Arena; Thessaloniki	FIBA SuproLeague; Final Four; Venue; 2001	Succeeded by PalaMalaguti; Bologna; Unified EuroLeague in 2001–02
Preceded by Rod Laver Arena; Melbourne	Davis Cup; Final Venue; 2002	Succeeded by Rod Laver Arena; Melbourne
Preceded by O2 World; Berlin	Euroleague; Final Four; Venue; 2010	Succeeded by Palau Sant Jordi; Barcelona
Preceded by Oval Lingotto; Turin	European Indoor Championships in Athletics; Venue; 2011	Succeeded by Scandinavium; Gothenburg
Preceded by Ice Palace; Saint Petersburg	IIHF Ice Hockey World Championship; Venue; 2017	Succeeded by Royal Arena; Copenhagen
Preceded by Incheon Munhak Stadium; Incheon	League of Legends World Championship; Final Venue; 2019	Succeeded by Pudong Football Stadium; Shanghai
