= William C. C. Chen =

Chinese-American martial artist

William Chi-Cheng Chen
- Born: 1933 (age 92–93); Zhejiang, China
- Style: Yang-style tai chi

Other information
- Website: William C.C. Chen Tai Chi Chuan

William Chi-Cheng Chen is a Grandmaster of Yang-style tai chi who currently lives in the US. His school is in New York City and he has hundreds of students around the world.

He was born in 1933 in Wenzhou, Zhejiang province, China. A US Passport error has his year of birth as 1935. After his family moved to Taiwan, he began studying tai chi under the tutelage of Prof. Cheng Man-ch'ing who was a childhood friend of William C. C. Chen's father. While studying under professor Cheng he also served as a translator. During this time he also taught students and attended competitions.

== Notes ==
- William C. C. Chen (1985). Body Mechanics of Tai Chi Chuan: For the Art of Self-defense. William C.C. Chen.
