= Journal of Asian Martial Arts =

The Journal of Asian Martial Arts (JAMA) was a quarterly magazine published by Via Media Publishing Company that covered various aspects of martial arts from Asia, but also included material from other parts of the world. The magazine had its headquarters in Santa Fe. It ceased publication in 2012, ending with a final book entitled "Asian Martial Arts".

== Content ==
The journal distinguished itself by offering in-depth articles and analysis of karate, taekwondo, judo, aikido, taijiquan, and shaolinquan, and many other Asian-based martial arts. Articles covered a wide range of inquiry including history, anthropology, health, medicine, mechanics, martial application, and culture. The articles were intended to be academically sound, yet written in a manner that made them accessible to the general reader. Illustrated with photographs and drawings (many by the late Oscar Ratti), charts and diagrams, and reference material distinguished this journal's oversize format.

The magazine had three main sections: academic articles, general articles that were more informal, and media reviews. Occasionally works of fiction or poetry were featured. Reviews were generally very thorough, and focused on books. Editor and Michael DeMarco established the magazine in 1992, and also began to publish books in 1999, starting with martial arts historian Robert W. Smith's memoir Martial Musings.

The magazine accepted submissions for articles that were reviewed by at least two members of the editorial board. The journal also claimed rigorous journalistic standards, avoiding bias or "infomercials" for particular styles or masters. The journal was recognized with a number of awards and accolades. Library Journal declared it "One of the Ten Best Magazines of 1992."

== Editions ==
The magazine was published in English, with Spanish and Greek editions available.

== See also ==
- Black Belt magazine
- Fightmag
- Karate Bushido
- Inside Kung Fu
- Kung Fu Magazine
