= Chen Weiming (scholar) =

Chen Weiming 陈微明
- Born: 1881; Qishui, Hubei, China
- Died: 1958 (aged 76–77)
- Style: Yang-style tai chi

Chen Wei-Ming
- Traditional Chinese: 陳微明
- Simplified Chinese: 陈微明
Transcriptions
Standard Mandarin
- Hanyu Pinyin: Chén Wēimíng
- Wade–Giles: Ch'en Wei-ming

Chen Weiming (1881–1958) was a scholar, tai chi teacher, and author. He was also known by his name Chen Zengze (陳曾則), Weiming being his hao, a pen-name.

Chen came from an educated family with roots in Qishui, Hubei, China. His great-grandfather was a famous scholar; and his mother was skilled at calligraphy. As a boy, Chen prepared for the civil service exams by studying the Chinese classics, Chinese calligraphy, poetry, and essay-writing. He passed the mid-level exam of juren in 1902, and received a post in the Qing History Office. His two brothers also became scholars and authors.

Chen began to study the Chinese martial arts in Beijing under Sun Lutang (1859–1933), with whom he studied Xingyiquan and bagua. He then began to study tai chi with Yang Chengfu (1883–1936), grandson of Yang Luchan, founder of the Yang family lineage.

In 1925, Chen moved to Shanghai and established the Zhi Ruo (Achieving Softness) Tai Chi Association.

Chen recorded Yang's teachings in three books under his own name: Taijiquan Shu ("The Art of Tai Chi", 1925), Taiji Jian ("Taiji Sword", 1928), and Taijiquan Dawen ("Questions and Answers on Tai Chi", 1929). These books are important not only for their content, but because they were among the first tai chi books published for a mass audience. Chen also wrote several scholarly books under the name Chen Zengze. He wrote prefaces to Sun Lutang and Zheng Manqing's tai chi books.

Though Chen did not create a large following through his teaching as did his classmates Dong Yingjie and Cheng Man-ch'ing, his books have remained influential and important references about tai chi in the early 1900s.
