= Herman Kauz =

Herman Kauz (1928 – January 30, 2020) was an American author and teacher of the martial arts, in particular tai chi.

== Biography ==
Herman Kauz was born in New York City in 1928. He was graduate of the University of Hawaii, studied at the University of Chicago, and held a master's degree from Columbia University.

Kauz studied and trained in Aikido, Judo, Karate, Wrestling, and tai chi. He died on January 30, 2020, at the age of 92.

== Works ==
The Tai Chi Handbook, Random House, ISBN 978-0-385-09370-5

The Martial Spirit, The Overlook Press, ISBN 978-0-87951-327-6

A Path to Liberation: A Spiritual and Philosophical Approach to the Martial Arts, The Overlook Press, ISBN 978-0-87951-457-0

Push Hands: Handbook for Non-Competitive Tai Chi Practice with a Partner, The Overlook Press, ISBN 978-1-58567-124-3

The Tai Chi Handbook was re-issued by The Overlook Press, 26 May 2009, ISBN 978-1-59020-179-4
