= Inside Kung Fu =

Defunct American Martial Arts Magazine

- Frequency: Quarterly
- First issue: 1973
- Final issue: April 2011
- Country: United States
- Language: English

Inside Kung-Fu was a monthly United States magazine founded in December 1973. Its last issue was in April 2011.

== History ==
The magazine featured articles on modern wushu and kung fu as well as tournaments and events in the United States and China. The magazine also covered the Filipino martial arts, reality-based self-defense, and martial arts movies. It had annually inducted martial artists into its Hall of Fame. The website of the magazine was started in 2006, with the owner being Action Pursuit Group Media. Inside Kung-Fu also started a YouTube account in 2007 and uploaded videos on southeast Asian martial arts, martial arts weapons and mixed martial arts. The magazine is relaunching its brand in 2022 with new owners leading the way, Dave Cater, Al Garza, and Al Garza II.

In 1997, an Inside Kung Fu former columnist received a restraining order for allegedly stalking television actress Sophia Crawford.

== See also ==
- Black belt magazine
- Kung Fu Magazine
- Journal of Asian Martial Arts
