= Kung Fu Tai Chi =

American martial arts magazine

- Categories: Martial art, Sport
- Frequency: Bimonthly
- Founded: 1992
- Company: TC Media, Inc
- Country: United States of America
- Based in: Fremont, California
- Language: English
- Website: Kung Fu Tai Chi Magazine

Kung Fu Tai Chi (also commonly known as Kung Fu Magazine) is a United States magazine covering martial arts and combat sports (mainly Chinese Martial Arts). Kung Fu Tai Chi magazine began publication 1992 and is owned by TC Media, Inc. The magazine was started as a quarterly. In 1996 its frequency was switched to bimonthly and in 2000 to monthly. In 2001 it again became a bimonthly magazine. The headquarters is in Fremont, California. In 2009 the magazine started a YouTube account and posts videos on covering the full spectrum of Chinese martial arts and demonstrations.

== See also ==
- Inside Kung Fu (magazine)
- Black Belt (magazine)
- Journal of Asian Martial Arts
