= Black Belt (magazine) =

American magazine covering martial arts and combat sports

- Cover of the first issue
- Categories: Martial Arts
- Frequency: Digital Daily
- Publisher: George Chung
- Founder: Mitoshi Uyehara
- Founded: 1961; 65 years ago
- First issue: April 1961
- Company: Jungo TV
- Country: United States
- Based in: Los Angeles, California
- Language: English
- Website: www.blackbeltmag.com

Black Belt is an American magazine covering martial arts and combat sports. The magazine is based in Hollywood, California, and is one of the oldest titles dedicated to martial arts in the United States.

== History and profile ==
The magazine was founded in 1961 by Mitoshi Uyehara. It was published by Uyehara under the company "Black Belt, Inc." based in Los Angeles until 1973. Although the publication went mainstream in 1961, the first magazine was produced and sold for ten cents and was put together on the kitchen floor of Uyehara's home in 1958. By the first year of producing a full publication in 1961, Uyehara was in debt for $30,000. This story has been one that he has shared with his children and grandchild to believe in oneself and fight against the odds. Bruce Lee contributed many articles to the publication during the 1960s. Uyehara, a martial artist in his own right, was a key personage in arranging Lee's material for publication. Uyehara founded Rainbow Publications in 1974.

Rainbow Publications was acquired by Sabot Publishing, a publisher of "special interest publications", in 1999. Sabot Publishing was in turn acquired by Active Interest Media in 2003, from which time the magazine has been under the supervision of "Group Publisher" (responsible for strategic development) Cheryl Angelheart. Active Interest Media no longer owns Black Belt.

Black Belt Publications was then acquired by Century Martial Arts. Black Belt Magazine started a YouTube channel in 2008 and uploads martial arts and action movies, videos demonstrating martial art techniques and weapons from classical to modern styles and interviews with known martial artists, experts, and martial art news.

Black Belt Magazine also added a podcast series to its existing multimedia offerings. The magazine launched its first podcast on December 23, 2021, featuring discussions, interviews, and perspectives on various martial arts disciplines and combat sports.

In July 2023, JungoTV, LLC acquired Black Belt Magazine.
