= Nth Degree (song) =

Single by Morningwood

from the album Morningwood
- Released: September 27, 2005
- Genre: Disco-Punk
- Length: 3:56
- Label: Capitol
- Songwriter: Pedro Yanowitz
- Producer: Gil Norton

Morningwood singles chronology
"New York Girls" (2005)	"Nth Degree" (2005)	"Jetsetter" (2006)

"Nth Degree" is a song by New York City band Morningwood from its debut album Morningwood. "Nth Degree" reached No. 30 on the Billboard Modern Rock Tracks chart. The song was used in a Mercury vehicles ad campaign that featured actress Jill Wagner. It was also included on the soundtrack for the video game Thrillville: Off the Rails.

== Music video ==
The video opens with a person browsing through some records. Each record shows the band on sets and in costumes carefully calculated to reference and parody about 16 other famous album covers or music videos from 20th century popular music. The album Morningwood is selected and begins playing on a record player just as the video ends.

=== Albums in the music video ===
The music video pays hommage to numerous musical styles. They are these:

- Nth Degree: by Morningwood, is black-and-white and features a hand playing a bass guitar.
- Chantal! Sing!: features lead singer Chantal Claret in purple on a black background.
- Saturday Morningwood: features a disco theme with Chantal in roller skates, and parodies the Saturday Night Fever soundtrack.
- Smell the Wood: by Morningwood, features the band as glam rockers. The name "Smell The Wood" is a reference to the fictitious band, Spinal Tap from the movie This Is Spinal Tap, where their album was titled, "Smell The Glove."
- "MW" has the logo and four picture layout of Van Halen (album).
- Morningwood features the band as they appear on the real Morningwood album.
- Old Country Morning features the band as country musicians.
- Mengde Uendelighets: (Not Norwegian for Nth Degree): by T Mérnving Wüd§ (Not Norwegian for Morningwood), features the band in matching red and yellow outfits on a green background, possibly a parody of this Country Church album or more likely the many earnestly leisure-suited Nordic album covers of the disco era.
- Degré d'Infinite: (French for Infinite Degree): by Le Bois de Matin (literal translation of morning wood).
- Mourning, credited to "The Woods."
- The Nth Degree: by Morningjerks, features the band as punk rockers in front of a graffiti-covered brick wall; this is an homage to the cover of the Ramones' eponymous album.
- Rippity Dippity Rap: by Positive Pedro, parodies Devastatin' Dave's Zip Zap Rap.
- Unbegrenztheit Grad (German for Nth Degree): by Morgenholz (literal translation into German of morning wood), parodies Kraftwerk's The Man-Machine in style and Devo's Freedom of Choice in layout.
- Stacks of Cash: by Moneywood, parodies 90's hip hop, particularly the Pen & Pixel-style album covers featuring artists superimposed over symbols of largesse.
- Working Out! with Morningwood: features the band in aerobics attire, parodies Olivia Newton-John's "Physical".

== Release history ==
Release dates and formats for "Nth Degree"
Region	Date	Format	Label(s)	Ref.
United States	January 24, 2006	Mainstream airplay	Capitol	
