= Chantal Claret =

American singer-songwriter

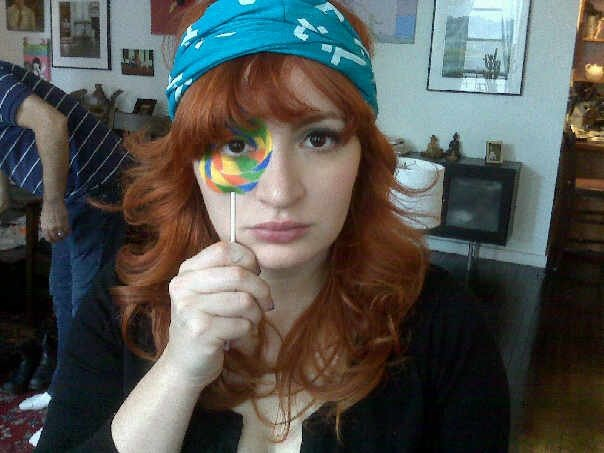

Background information
- Born: February 21, 1982 (age 44); Berkeley, California, U.S.
- Origin: New York City, U.S.
- Genres: Indie rock, power pop, soul
- Occupations: Singer; songwriter; actress
- Years active: 2004–present
- Labels: Capitol; MTV; The End
- Formerly of: Morningwood
- Spouse: Jimmy Urine (m. 2008)

Chantal Claret Euringer (born February 21, 1982) is an American singer-songwriter. She is best known as the lead singer for the rock and power pop band Morningwood.

== Early life ==
Claret was born in Berkeley, California, on February 21, 1982, the daughter of Romanian mother Monique (1947–2004) and American father Foster Claret. Her parents were both art collectors. She primarily grew up in New York City, but has also lived in Texas. As a teenager, she was a promoter for several clubs in New York City.

== Music career ==
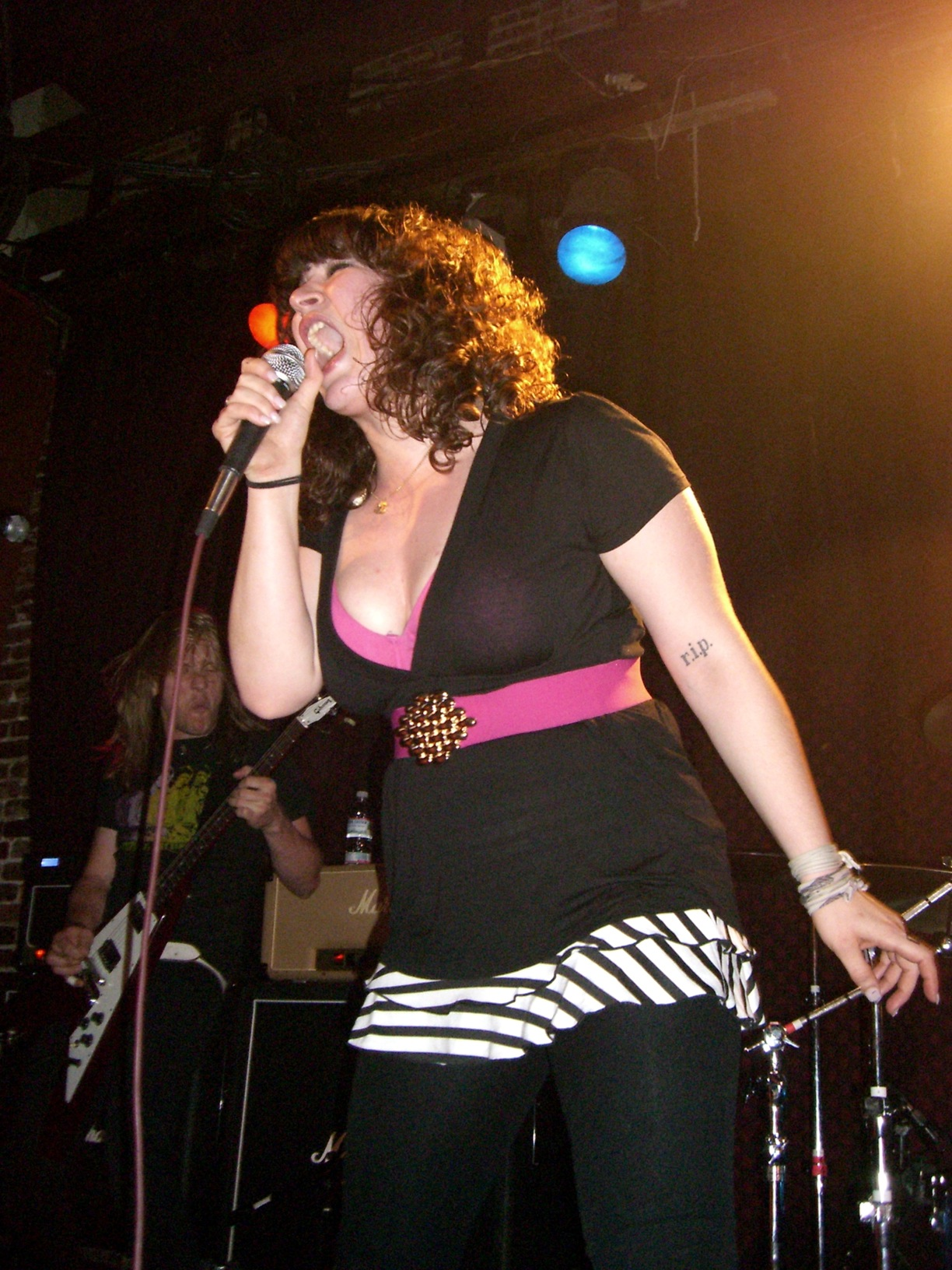
Claret performing in 2006

Claret, along with Thrice drummer Riley Breckenridge, wrote a monthly advice column called "Battle of the Sexes" in Alternative Press magazine for nearly three years until late 2007.

Prior to meeting Pedro Yanowitz and starting Morningwood with him, Claret says she was attending film school with an eye on directing music videos. She directed the Morningwood music video for "Take Off Your Clothes" & "Snobby Little Elf", as well as claymation video for "Little Hard On's" by The Left Rights. In 1999 Claret appeared in the short film, American Mod. She is featured on the song "Wait (The Nexus)" by Mike Relm. Morningwood played their final show at Irving Plaza in New York, on March 11, 2012.

On March 5, 2012, Vevo featured Claret's debut video "Pop Pop Bang Bang" directed by David Yarovesky for her solo EP The Pleasure Seeker, which was released on The End Records on April 3, 2012. Her debut solo record The One, The Only... was released on June 19, 2012. "Bite Your Tongue" can be heard in commercials for Degrassi: The Next Generation Season 12 Promo as well as ESPN's First Take. "Honey Honey" and "Pleasure Seeker" have been featured on VH1's Mob Wives.

"Pop Pop Bang Bang" was featured on Perez Hilton's first music compilation entitled Pop Up planned to be released on August 7, 2012.

Beginning September 29, 2012, Claret began a three-month residency at Hard Rock Hotel and Casino (Las Vegas) in Las Vegas at their new music venue, Vinyl.

In March 2013, she signed to BMG as a songwriter. In August 2013 Claret wrote the theme song "I'm Serious" for Bravo's Eat, Drink, Love. On September 10, 2014, Claret began a Pledge Campaign for her No Good Way To Die EP which was 100% funded within 24 hours.

In January 2015, Claret and her husband Jimmy Urine released a song "Daisy Bell" under the name of Tour Crush. In 2017, Claret appeared as a guest host on the Catfish: The TV Show episode “Marvin & Austin”.

In 2023, she collaborated with the band Princess Goes, made up of Michael C. Hall, Matt Katz-Bohen, and Peter Yanowitz, on the track "Beija" for their second album 'Come of Age.

== Personal life ==
On January 18, 2008, Claret married singer and musician Jimmy Urine. In 2018, they relocated to Wellington, New Zealand. In June 2019, Claret gave birth to her and Urine's twin daughters. That same month, she published an article for The New York Times about how pregnancy affected her creative drive.

== Discography ==
=== Morningwood ===
- Morningwood (EP) (Rockhardcock Records; 2003)
- It's Tits (EP) (Possibly The Last Record Company; 2003)
- Morningwood (Capitol Records; January 10, 2006)
- Sugarbaby (EP) (Capitol Records; 2008)
- Diamonds & Studs (MTV/VH1 Records; October 27, 2009)

=== Chantal Claret ===
- The Pleasure Seeker (EP) (The End Records; April 3, 2012)
- The One, The Only... (The End Records; June 19, 2012)
- "I'm Serious" (single) (Selectracks; August 13, 2013)
- Tour Crush, "Daisy Bell" (single) (Tour Crush; January 18, 2014)
- Chantal Claret, No Good Way To Die (EP) (Independent; December 2, 2014)
- Chantal Claret, "The Girl is Back In Town" (single) (Independent; December 2, 2014)
- Chantal Claret, Battles of a Heavy Heart (Independent; February 21, 2015)
- Chantal Claret, Conquistadora (EP) (Independent; February 26, 2016)
- Chantal Claret, Let's Pretend Everything's Okay (EP) (Independent; March 23, 2017)

=== Other appearances ===
- "Wait (The Nexus)" by Mike Relm, featuring Chantal Claret (YouTube video) (Radio Fried Records; January 14, 2010)
- Friends of P – Tribute To The Rentals (Manifesto Records; 2008)
  - Morningwood, cover of "The Cruise" (1999)
- New Tales to Tell: A Tribute to Love & Rockets (Justice Records; August 18, 2009)
  - Chantal Claret vs Adrian Young, cover of "Lazy" (1987)
  - Netflix original series Love, character Shaun
  - ‘She Makes Waves’ on Saving Bikini Bottom The Movie. [1]
- Mindless Self Indulgence — If
  - Backup vocalist on Get It Up
  - Featured on On It
  - Featured on Evening Wear
