= Sugarbaby (EP) =

EP by Morningwood
- Released: 2008
- Genre: Rock
- Label: Capitol

Morningwood chronology
Morningwood (2003)	Sugarbaby (2008)	Diamonds & Studs (2009)

Sugarbaby is the third extended play album from American rock ensemble Morningwood. The song "Sugarbaby" is featured in episode "Drama Follows Them" for television show The Hills, in addition to being the theme song for television program You're Cut Off!.

== Critical reception ==
Snobsmusic.net describes the song "Sugarbaby" as being "reminiscent of late-era, overly slick Garbage". Devin Estlin of Bust.com describes the EP as "a party just waiting to happen". Sputnikmusic describes the eponymous single as "a step to the left from their previous release" with "atrocious lyrics".

== Track listing ==
1. "Sugarbaby" – 3:02
2. "That's How You Know It's Love" – 3:35
3. "Killer Life" – 2:33
4. "Best Of Me" – 3:00
