= The Bachelor (American TV series) season 9 =

The Bachelor
- Season 9
- Starring: Lorenzo Borghese
- Presented by: Chris Harrison
- No. of contestants: 27
- Winner: Jennifer Wilson
- Runner-up: Sadie Murray
- No. of episodes: 8

Release
- Original network: ABC
- Original release: October 3 – November 27, 2006

Season chronology
- ← Previous; Season 8 Next → Season 10

The Bachelor: Rome is the ninth season of ABC reality television series The Bachelor. The show was filmed in Rome, Italy. The season premiered on October 3, 2006.

The show featured 34-year-old Prince Lorenzo Borghese, an Italian American cosmetics entrepreneur, courting 25 women. The season concluded on November 27, 2006, with Borghese choosing to pursue a relationship with 24-year-old teacher Jennifer Wilson. The couple ended their relationship shortly after the finale aired.

== Contestants ==
Traditionally the Bachelor chooses from an original cast of 25 bachelorettes, however this season show producers brought in two additional ladies who are local Italians bringing the total women to 27.

The following is the list of bachelorettes for this season:

Name	Age	Hometown	Occupation	Outcome
Jennifer Wilson	24	Pembroke Pines, Florida	Teacher	Winner
Sadie Murray	23	Carlsbad, California	Publicist	Week 7
Lisa Blank	25	Portland, Oregon	Marketing manager	Week 6
Agnese Polliza	24	Venice, Italy	Student	Week 5
Desiree Valentin	22	Salt Lake City, Utah	Realtor	Week 4
Jeanette Pawula	23	Bloomingdale, Illinois	Teacher	Week 4
Erica Rose	23	Houston, Texas	Attorney	Week 3
Gina Clark	28	Dallas, Texas	Ultrasound technician	Week 3
Jami Matzke	27	Galveston, Texas	Event planner	Week 3
Ellen DeMaio	30	New Haven, Connecticut	Realtor	Week 2
Kimberly "Kim" Jackson	27	Newport Beach, California	Interior designer	Week 2
Sarah Schnare	30	Nelson, British Columbia	Journalist	Week 2
April Jacobs	23	Hyde Park, Chicago, Illinois	Model	Week 1
Andrea Shirley	28	Cincinnati, Ohio	Hotel concierge	Week 1
Britt Keeder	28	Columbus, Ohio	Beer chemist	Week 1
Carissa Ilburg	25	Cattaraugus, New York	Attorney	Week 1
Claudia Gismondi	22	Boca Raton, Florida	Restaurateur	Week 1
Cosetta Blanca		Italy	Dancer	Week 1
Elyse Hammer	27	Meadow Vista, California	Physician	Week 1
Heather Sneed	34	Aliquippa, Pennsylvania	Registered nurse	Week 1
Jessica Horner	25	Charlotte, North Carolina	Assistant buyer	Week 1
Laura Morgan	29	Spring Valley, California	Dolphin trainer	Week 1
Meryl "Meri" Barr	27	Biloxi, Mississippi	Attorney	Week 1
Renée Snell	30	Baltimore, Maryland	Broadcast marketer	Week 1
Rita Ghazal	29	Richmond, Virginia	Policy advisor	Week 1
Rosella Fratto	27	Homer Glen, Illinois	Make-up artist	Week 1
Tara Durr	24	St. Augustine, Florida	Realtor	Week 1

=== Future appearances ===
==== Bachelor Pad ====
Erica Rose returned to compete in the second season of Bachelor Pad where she and her partner, Blake Julian, were eliminated in week 5. She returned in the third season of Bachelor Pad the following year and once again was eliminated in week 5.

== Elimination Chart ==
#	Contestants	Week						
#	Contestants	1	2	3	4	5	6	7
1	Agnese	Sadie	Desiree	Agnese	Jennifer	Lisa	Sadie	Jennifer
2	Andrea	Agnese	Jeanette	Lisa	Agnese	Sadie	Jennifer	Sadie
3	April	Desiree	Lisa	Jeanette	Sadie	Jennifer	Lisa	
4	Brit	Gina	Gina	Jennifer	Lisa	Agnese		
5	Carissa	Sarah	Jami	Sadie	Desiree; Jeanette			
6	Claudia	Ellen	Agnese	Desiree	Desiree; Jeanette			
7	Cosetta	Jennifer	Erica	Erica; Gina; Jami				
8	Desiree	Lisa	Jennifer	Erica; Gina; Jami				
9	Ellen	Gina	Sadie	Erica; Gina; Jami				
10	Elyse	Jami	Ellen; Kim; Sarah					
11	Erica	Erica	Ellen; Kim; Sarah					
12	Gina	Kim	Ellen; Kim; Sarah					
13	Heather	April; Andrea; Brit; Carissa; Claudia; Cosetta; Elyse; Heather; Jessica; Laura; Meri; Renee; Rita; Rosella; Tara						
14	Jami	April; Andrea; Brit; Carissa; Claudia; Cosetta; Elyse; Heather; Jessica; Laura; Meri; Renee; Rita; Rosella; Tara						
15	Jeanette	April; Andrea; Brit; Carissa; Claudia; Cosetta; Elyse; Heather; Jessica; Laura; Meri; Renee; Rita; Rosella; Tara						
16	Jennifer	April; Andrea; Brit; Carissa; Claudia; Cosetta; Elyse; Heather; Jessica; Laura; Meri; Renee; Rita; Rosella; Tara						
17	Jessica	April; Andrea; Brit; Carissa; Claudia; Cosetta; Elyse; Heather; Jessica; Laura; Meri; Renee; Rita; Rosella; Tara						
18	Kim	April; Andrea; Brit; Carissa; Claudia; Cosetta; Elyse; Heather; Jessica; Laura; Meri; Renee; Rita; Rosella; Tara						
19	Laura	April; Andrea; Brit; Carissa; Claudia; Cosetta; Elyse; Heather; Jessica; Laura; Meri; Renee; Rita; Rosella; Tara						
20	Lisa	April; Andrea; Brit; Carissa; Claudia; Cosetta; Elyse; Heather; Jessica; Laura; Meri; Renee; Rita; Rosella; Tara						
21	Meri	April; Andrea; Brit; Carissa; Claudia; Cosetta; Elyse; Heather; Jessica; Laura; Meri; Renee; Rita; Rosella; Tara						
22	Renee	April; Andrea; Brit; Carissa; Claudia; Cosetta; Elyse; Heather; Jessica; Laura; Meri; Renee; Rita; Rosella; Tara						
23	Rita	April; Andrea; Brit; Carissa; Claudia; Cosetta; Elyse; Heather; Jessica; Laura; Meri; Renee; Rita; Rosella; Tara						
24	Rosella	April; Andrea; Brit; Carissa; Claudia; Cosetta; Elyse; Heather; Jessica; Laura; Meri; Renee; Rita; Rosella; Tara						
25	Sadie	April; Andrea; Brit; Carissa; Claudia; Cosetta; Elyse; Heather; Jessica; Laura; Meri; Renee; Rita; Rosella; Tara						
26	Sarah	April; Andrea; Brit; Carissa; Claudia; Cosetta; Elyse; Heather; Jessica; Laura; Meri; Renee; Rita; Rosella; Tara						
27	Tara	April; Andrea; Brit; Carissa; Claudia; Cosetta; Elyse; Heather; Jessica; Laura; Meri; Renee; Rita; Rosella; Tara						

The contestant won the competition.
The contestant was eliminated at the rose ceremony.

== Episodes ==
No. overall	No. in season	Title	Original release date	Prod. code	U.S. viewers (millions)	Rating/share (18–49)
72	1	"Week 1"	October 2, 2006	901	7.53	3.1/8
The girls pull up in a limo as Lorenzo greets each one with a smile. The girls and Lorenzo talk all night and the show ends with a rose ceremony where Lorenzo sends home over half of the ladies.
73	2	"Week 2"	October 9, 2006	902	7.93	3.1/7
The remaining 12 women are divided up into single and group dates. Lisa received the first single date with Lorenzo. The other girls go on a group date with Lorenzo. The show ends with a rose ceremony and 3 girls are eliminated.
74	3	"Week 3"	October 16, 2006	903	8.66	3.3/8
The nine remaining Bachelorettes find out there's going to be a group date, a two-on-one date and a solo date with Lorenzo. Three ladies are eliminated at the rose ceremony.
75	4	"Week 4"	October 23, 2006	904	8.18	3.2/8
There is one group date and two one-on-one dates in this episode. The women who get roses this week will also get a hometown visit to have Lorenzo meet their parents. Two ladies are eliminated at the rose ceremony.
76	5	"Week 5"	October 30, 2006	905	7.77	3.1/7
Lorenzo proceeds to go on the hometown dates with the bachelorettes. He meets the girl's families. Lorenzo eliminates one girl at the rose ceremony which leaves him with three girls for the remaining shows.
77	6	"Week 6"	November 6, 2006	906	8.35	3.3/8
78	7	"The Women Tell All"	November 13, 2006	N/A	7.40	2.7/6
79	8	"Week 7"	November 20, 2006	907	9.85	3.9/9
80	9	"Week 8"	November 27, 2006	908	N/A	TBA

== The winner ==
Jennifer Wilson was the eventual winner of "The Bachelor: Rome". As of the end of the show, Jennifer was a Glades Middle School teacher from Pembroke Pines. Jennifer graduated from Dade Christian School and the University of Michigan with a bachelor's degree in general studies.

== After the show ==
Jennifer Wilson and Lorenzo Borghese broke up after a long-distance relationship where he was in New York while she was in South Florida. Lorenzo did not propose to Jennifer, but gave her the final rose. Jennifer Wilson was accused of secretly dating Dan Herrero, another teacher at the school she worked at, by The National Enquirer soon after the end of the show. The Enquirer included pictures of them "frolicking on the beach" together three days after the initial report. Lorenzo Borghese later began dating runner-up Sadie Murray. Erica Rose later appeared on season one of VH1's "You're Cut Off" and seasons 2 and 3 of Bachelor Pad.
