= Pedro Yanowitz =

American musician (born 1967)

Peter Yanowitz
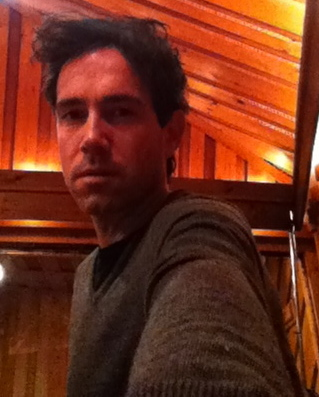
- Peter Yanowitz at Avatar studios NYC

Background information
- Born: Peter Yanowitz; September 13, 1967 (age 59); Chicago, Illinois, United States
- Instruments: Drums, bass, guitar, vocals
- Years active: 1992–present
- Member of: Princess Goes, Exclamation Pony
- Formerly of: The Wallflowers, Morningwood

Peter Yanowitz (born September 13, 1967, Chicago, Illinois, United States), also known as Pedro Yanowitz, is an American musician, songwriter, and visual artist. Yanowitz was the original drummer of The Wallflowers, and for Natalie Merchant on her first three solo records Tigerlily, Ophelia, and Live in Concert. He also played drums for Money Mark, the Black Sabbath tribute band Hand of Doom with Melissa Auf der Maur, and with Nina Nastasia, on her album Dogs. Other artists Yanowitz has played drums with include: Yoko Ono, Allen Ginsberg, and Wilco . Yanowitz was also the bass player, songwriter, and producer for the band Morningwood. Currently, Yanowitz is the drummer of Exclamation Pony with Ryan Jarman. Peter also performed as 'Schlatko', the drummer of The Angry Inch in the Tony award-winning Broadway musical Hedwig and the Angry Inch, starring Neil Patrick Harris, Andrew Rannells, Michael C. Hall, John Cameron Mitchell, Darren Criss, and Taye Diggs. Peter is the drummer in the 3 man band, Princess Goes, along with vocalist Michael C. Hall and keyboardist Matt Katz-Bohen.

== Early life ==
Yanowitz was born in Chicago's Hyde Park and was raised Jewish in Salt Lake City, Utah. His father, Frank Yanowitz is a jazz musician/composer and a cardiologist. Yanowitz began playing drums at the age of seven. He received an English major from Tufts University in 1989.

== The Wallflowers/Natalie Merchant/Morningwood ==
In 1990 Yanowitz moved to Los Angeles and became one of the founding members and original drummer of the Wallflowers. Yanowitz co-produced 4 songs on the Wallflowers self-titled debut for Virgin Records also co-writing on the song "After the Blackbird Sings".

Yanowitz met Natalie Merchant in Los Angeles in 1994 and soon moved to New York to work closely with Merchant on what was to be her first solo record Tigerlily. Featuring the three top 40 hits, "Carnival", "Wonder", and "Jealousy", Tigerlily went on to sell over six million copies, and remains Merchant's best selling record to date. Yanowitz recorded two more records with Merchant, Ophelia, and Live in Concert. Yanowitz was Merchant's boyfriend from 1994 until their abrupt split in 2000.

In 2001, Yanowitz took on the nickname "Pedro" and began writing his own songs. He met Chantal Claret at a party and they started writing songs for what was to be Morningwood's first album. They were signed to Capitol Records in 2003. Working with producer Gil Norton, Morningwood recorded their first record in London at the RAK Studios. Yanowitz wrote the hits "Nth Degree", which was used by Lincoln-Mercury in several of their car commercials, and "New York Girls", which was featured in the movie Sex and the City. After parting ways with Capitol, Morningwood wrote and recorded their second record, Diamonds & Studs, which Yanowitz co-produced with Junior Sanchez, and it was released in October 2009 by VH1/MTV records. VH1 and MTV incorporated several songs from Diamonds & Studs in their programming, including "Best of Me", which was the theme song for Daisy of Love, "Killerlife", which MTV used as a theme song for Peak Season, and "Sugarbaby" which was used as the theme song for VH1's You're Cut Off.

== Other projects ==
In the early 1990s, Yanowitz struck up a friendship with Allen Ginsberg after meeting him at the Tibet House Benefit. They performed several times together at Carnegie Hall, and stayed friends until his death in 1997. Yanowitz played percussion on the record Mermaid Avenue (1998) by Billy Bragg and Wilco. Yanowitz also played drums with Nina Nastasia in 2000 on her cult classic album Dogs, which was produced by Steve Albini. In 2001, Yanowitz recorded and played live with Money Mark on his critically lauded record "Change Is Coming". With Melissa Auf der Maur and her boyfriend at the time, Dave Grohl, Yanowitz started the band Hand of Doom, a Black Sabbath tribute band, and recorded a live record at the Whiskey in 2002. In 2008, Yanowitz played drums in Yoko Ono's band when she headlined the Pitchfork Music Festival. The band also included Stephen Trask, and Thurston Moore. Yanowitz recently collaborated with Andrew W.K. on Andrew's EP titled "Party All Goddamn Night", featuring a track they wrote and produced together titled "We're All Women". Yanowitz also wrote music for Sesame Street, penning the music for "rhyme time". After meeting Stephen Trask at a writer's retreat in Oklahoma in 2006, Yanowitz began collaborating on the music and lyrics for the Broadway musical adaptation of Clueless. In the summer of 2013 Yanowitz wrote and performed in his own show called 'Walking In Soho" at the Signature Theatre as part of the New York Musical Theatre Festival.

Yanowitz and Trask co-wrote the rock opera This Ain't No Disco, which ran at the Atlantic Theater Company between June 30, 2018, and August 12, 2018.

Yanowitz has been a member of the self-described "kaleidoscopic sound weather" trio Princess Goes to the Butterfly Museum since 2018, alongside Michael C. Hall and Matt Katz-Bohen. Their eponymous debut EP was released 2 April 2020. In 2023, the band released their second album, 'Come of Age'. Their third full length album, "3" was released on October 30th, 2026.

== Personal life ==
Yanowitz is married to former model, Lisa Davies.

== Discography ==
- The Wallflowers, The Wallflowers (Virgin Records 1992)
- Darlene & Co, Absence in uniformity (1993)
- Natalie Merchant, Tigerlily (Elektra Records 1995)
- Natalie Merchant, Ophelia (Elektra Records 1997)
- Billy Bragg & Wilco, Mermaid Avenue (Elektra Records 1998)
- Natalie Merchant, Live in Concert (Elektra Records 1999)
- Nina Nastasia, Dogs (Touch & Go Records 2000, reissued 2004)
- Money Mark, Change Is Coming (Emperor Norton 2001)
- Hand of Doom Live in Los Angeles (Idaho Records 2002)
- Morningwood, Morningwood (Capitol Records 2004)
- Morningwood, Diamonds & Studs (MTV/VH1 Records 2009)
- Hedwig and the Angry Inch, (Cast album), (2014)
- Princess Goes To The Butterfly Museum - EP (April 2, 2020)
- Princess Goes To The Butterfly Museum - Thanks For Coming (February 12, 2021)
- Princess Goes - Come of Age (Oct. 2023)
- Princess Goes - "3" - October 30, 2026)
