= Jetsetter =

A jet-setter is a member of the Jet Set.

Jetsetter or jet setter may also refer to:

- JET SETTER, the call sign for Jet Aviation
- Jetsetter, a travel brand of TripAdvisor
- Jetsetter, a travel website under Gilt Groupe
- "Jetsetter", a song by Fran Cosgrave and the Inner City Playboys
- "Jetsetter", a song by Morningwood on Morningwood (album)
- "Jetsetter", a song by A Loss For Words
