= Morningwood (album) =

Studio album by Morningwood
- Released: January 10, 2006
- Recorded: Rak Studios
- Genres: Alternative rock, dance-rock, electropunk, power pop
- Length: 37:41
- Label: Capitol
- Producer: Gil Norton

Morningwood chronology
Morningwood (2006)	Diamonds & Studs (2009)

Morningwood is the first studio album by the New York City band Morningwood. It was released on Capitol Records in 2006.

The album peaked at #102 on the Billboard 200 and #1 on the Heatseekers album chart.

Several tracks were used on the soundtracks of video games: "Nü Rock" on Burnout Revenge, Burnout Legends and SSX on Tour; "Jetsetter" on Midnight Club 3: DUB Edition Remix; "Everybody Rules" on Thrillville; "Nth Degree" on Thrillville: Off the Rails; and "Babysitter" on The Sopranos: Road to Respect.

"Nth Degree" was used in the CW television show One Tree Hill (season 3, episode 14), as was and "Body 21" (season 3, episode 5). "New York Girls" was used in the 2008 film adaptation of HBO's Sex and the City.

== Critical reception ==
Professional ratings
Aggregate scores
Source	Rating
Metacritic	(55/100)
Review scores
Source	Rating
Allmusic	2.5/5 stars
Robert Christgau	(3-star Honorable Mention)
Rolling Stone	3/5 stars
San Diego CityBeat	4/5 stars
Slant Magazine	2/5 stars
Stylus Magazine	D+

The album received mixed responses from critics reflected on Metacritic by its normalized score of 55 out of 100 based on 12 reviews. Jonathan Ringen of Rolling Stone called it "a catchier-than-chlamydia mix of power-pop hooks and effects-heavy riffage" but noted that "all the candy-coated excess might leave you feeling a little like Courtney Love after a heavy night". For Allmusic, Johnny Loftus referred to the songs as "sexy catch phrases around rhythms that have been heard before".

== Track listing ==
All songs written by Pedro Yanowitz & Chantal Claret except as noted.

1. "Nü Rock" (Claret, Timo Ellis) – 2:30
2. "Televisor" – 3:37
3. "Nth Degree" (Yanowitz) – 3:55
4. "Jetsetter" – 3:54
5. "Take Off Your Clothes" – 3:17
6. "Body 21" – 3:37
7. "Easy" (Yanowitz, Claret, Richard Steel, Japa Keenon) – 3:10
8. "Babysitter" – 3:31
9. "New York Girls" (Yanowitz) – 2:56
10. "Everybody Rules" (Yanowitz, Claret, Ellis) – 3:08
11. "Ride the Lights" – 4:06
12. "Knock on Wood" (Eddie Floyd, Steve Cropper) (Japan only bonus track) – 3:53

== Personnel ==
- Chantal Claret – vocals
- Peter "Pedro" Yanowitz – bass guitar, backing vocalist
- Japa Keenon – drums
- Richard Steel – guitar
