= The Bachelor (American TV series) season 10 =

The Bachelor
- Season 10
- Starring: Andrew Baldwin
- Presented by: Chris Harrison
- No. of contestants: 25
- Winner: Tessa Horst
- Runner-up: Bevin Powers
- No. of episodes: 9

Release
- Original network: ABC
- Original release: April 2 – May 22, 2007

Season chronology
- ← Previous; Season 9 Next → Season 11

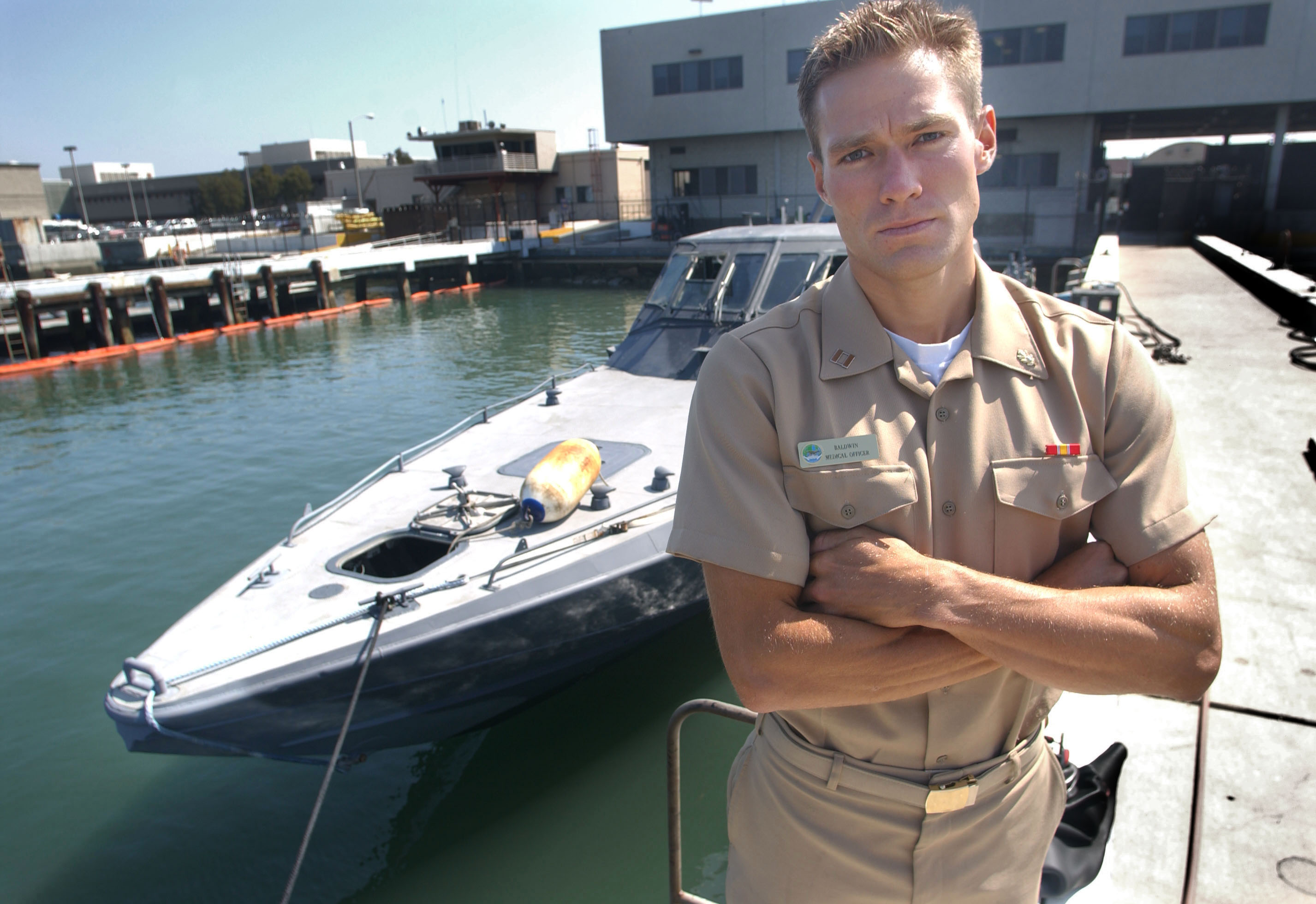
Andrew Baldwin

The Bachelor: Officer and a Gentleman is the tenth season of ABC reality television series The Bachelor. The show was filmed in Los Angeles, Hawaii, and Pennsylvania, and premiered on April 2, 2007. This season features the first US Navy Officer, 30-year-old Andy Baldwin from Lancaster, Pennsylvania.

The season concluded on May 21, 2007, Baldwin choosing to propose to 26-year-old social worker Tessa Horst. Horst became the first winner of Asian descent in the Bachelor franchise. The couple soon ended their engagement and briefly resumed dating, but finally broke up for good later that year.

== Contestants ==
The following is the list of bachelorettes for this season:

Name	Age	Hometown	Occupation	Outcome
Tessa Horst	26	San Francisco, California	Social Worker	Winner
Bevin Nicole Powers	28	Palo Alto, California	Assistant	Week 8
Danielle Imwalle	25	Bethel, Connecticut	Graphic Designer	Week 7
Amber Alchalabi	23	Sugar Land, Texas	Teacher	Week 6
Stephanie Wilhite	23	Overland Park, Kansas	Project Manager	Week 5
Tina Wu	26	Lenox Hill, New York	Medical student	Week 5
Kate Brockhouse	24	Ravenel, South Carolina	Boutique owner	Week 4
Nicole Clary	26	Charleston, South Carolina	Sales Manager	Week 4
Stephanie Tipper	27	Folly Beach, South Carolina	Organ donor coordinator	Week 4
Amanda Hackney	26	Dallas, Texas	Financial analyst	Week 3
Erin Parker	24	Logansport, Louisiana	Financial analyst	Week 3
Peyton Wright	24	Kingsport, Tennessee	Sorority recruiter	Week 3
Alexis Young	26	Southlake, Texas	Attorney	Week 2
Susan Anderson	23	The Woodlands, Texas	Boutique manager	Week 2
Tiffany Warren	28	Boston, Massachusetts	Medical equipment sales rep	Week 2
Blakeney Rowe	29	Birmingham, Alabama	Radio sales	Week 1
Candice DeCost	23	Hilton Head Island, South Carolina	Waitress	Week 1
Catherine Warren	23	Lake Forest, Illinois	Former Miss Illinois	Week 1
Danielle Vallis	26	The Bronx, New York	Attorney	Week 1
Jacqueline "Jackie" Topelli	23	Minneapolis, Minnesota	Executive coordinator	Week 1
Jeanette Alvarez	27	Tampa, Florida	Health care manager	Week 1
Jessica Devallo	32	New York, New York	Hedge fund analyst	Week 1
Linda Malek	33	Cuyahoga Falls, Ohio	Attorney	Week 1
Lindsay Smith	22	Lawrence, Kansas	Student	Week 1
Tiffany Forester	27	St. Louis Park, Minnesota	Real estate sales/development	Week 1

=== Future appearances ===
==== Bachelor Pad ====
Peyton Wright returned to compete for the first season of Bachelor Pad. She and her partner Jesse Beck were eliminated in week 5, finishing in 7th/8th.

== Call-out order ==
#	Bachelorettes	Week							
#	Bachelorettes	1	2	3	4	5	6	7	8
1	Alexis	Stephanie T.	Stephanie T.	Bevin	Amber	Bevin	Tessa	Bevin	Tessa
2	Nicole	Peyton	Tessa	Tessa	Tessa	Amber	Bevin	Tessa	Bevin
3	Amanda	Bevin	Danielle I.	Amber	Danielle I.	Tessa	Danielle I.	Danielle I.	
4	Peyton	Kate	Bevin	Danielle I.	Bevin	Danielle I.	Amber		
5	Catherine	Alexis	Amber	Stephanie W.	Tina	Stephanie W. Tina			
6	Amber	Danielle I.	Stephanie W.	Tina	Stephanie W.	Stephanie W. Tina			
7	Blakeney	Amber	Kate	Kate	Kate; Nicole; Stephanie T.				
8	Danielle V.	Tiffany W.	Nicole	Nicole	Kate; Nicole; Stephanie T.				
9	Jackie	Tessa	Tina	Stephanie T.	Kate; Nicole; Stephanie T.				
10	Stephanie W.	Nicole	Peyton	Amanda					
11	Tina	Susan	Amanda	Erin					
12	Erin	Amanda	Erin	Peyton					
13	Susan	Erin	Alexis; Susan						
14	Stephanie T.	Tina	Alexis; Susan						
15	Danielle I.	Stephanie W.	Tiffany W.						
16	Bevin	Blakeney; Candice; Catherine; Danielle V. Jackie; Jeanette; Jessica; Linda; Lindsay; Tiffany F.							
17	Tessa	Blakeney; Candice; Catherine; Danielle V. Jackie; Jeanette; Jessica; Linda; Lindsay; Tiffany F.							
18	Candice	Blakeney; Candice; Catherine; Danielle V. Jackie; Jeanette; Jessica; Linda; Lindsay; Tiffany F.							
19	Jeanette	Blakeney; Candice; Catherine; Danielle V. Jackie; Jeanette; Jessica; Linda; Lindsay; Tiffany F.							
20	Lindsay	Blakeney; Candice; Catherine; Danielle V. Jackie; Jeanette; Jessica; Linda; Lindsay; Tiffany F.							
21	Kate	Blakeney; Candice; Catherine; Danielle V. Jackie; Jeanette; Jessica; Linda; Lindsay; Tiffany F.							
22	Linda	Blakeney; Candice; Catherine; Danielle V. Jackie; Jeanette; Jessica; Linda; Lindsay; Tiffany F.							
23	Tiffany F.	Blakeney; Candice; Catherine; Danielle V. Jackie; Jeanette; Jessica; Linda; Lindsay; Tiffany F.							
24	Jessica	Blakeney; Candice; Catherine; Danielle V. Jackie; Jeanette; Jessica; Linda; Lindsay; Tiffany F.							
25	Tiffany W.	Blakeney; Candice; Catherine; Danielle V. Jackie; Jeanette; Jessica; Linda; Lindsay; Tiffany F.							

The contestant received the first impression rose.
The contestant was eliminated at the rose ceremony.
The contestant received a rose on a date.
The contestant was eliminated on a date.
The contestant won the competition.

== Episodes ==
No. overall	No. in season	Title	Original release date	Prod. code	U.S. viewers (millions)	Rating/share (18–49)
80	1	"Week 1"	April 2, 2007	1001	9.86	3.7/9
81	2	"Week 2"	April 9, 2007	1002	9.06	3.4/9
82	3	"Week 3"	April 16, 2007	1003	9.03	3.5/9
83	4	"Week 4"	April 23, 2007	1004	9.13	3.4/9
84	5	"Week 5"	April 30, 2007	1005	9.80	3.7/10
85	6	"Week 6"	May 7, 2007	1006	10.39	3.7/10
86	7	"Week 7"	May 14, 2007	1007	10.64	4.0/10
87	8	"Week 8"	May 21, 2007	1008	12.67	4.8/12
88	9	"After the Final Rose"	May 22, 2007	N/A	8.00	N/A

== About the winner ==
Tessa Horst grew up in Washington, D.C., where she graduated from Georgetown Day School in 1999 and Middlebury College in 2003. She received her MS degree in social work from Columbia University. Prior to entering graduate studies, Horst lived in Jackson Hole, Wyoming in 2004, where she was employed at the famous Silver Dollar Bar of The Wort Hotel. At the time she competed on The Bachelor, she was employed as a social worker living in San Francisco.

Three months after the finale, Horst and Baldwin called off the engagement.
