= The One, The Only... =

Studio album by Chantal Claret
- Released: June 19, 2012
- Genre: Pop, Soul
- Label: The End Records

The One, The Only... is the debut album of musician Chantal Claret, released on June 19, 2012, by The End Records and was recorded at Studio Edison in New York. "The Pleasure Seeker - EP" appears in the gallery of the iPod Classic on Apple's US site.

== Background ==
Claret describes the album as “Tina Turner fronting Outkast at Bette Midler’s bat mitzvah.” She adds, “I wanted to make music that sounds like it could’ve been written in the ’60s or ’70s, but with a big fat hip-hop-like low end." "Pleasure Seeker" is the first song she wrote for The One, The Only... and was written about her father. Claret was originally very nervous about showing it to him, but he says that he "fucking loved it" and is proud of the song and plays it for everyone. "Honey Honey" was written for her husband, Jimmy Urine of Mindless Self Indulgence. For Urine's birthday, Claret took him to shoot guns with Michael Rooker at his private range. While there, Rooker kept using gun slang. A few weeks later, she was writing "Pop Pop Bang Bang" and called him to make sure she was using the correct terminology.

I love upbeat 60′s music: the British Invasion, the doo wop dollies, Phil Spector’s Wall of Sound, blue-eyed soul–all of it. When I turned 15, I started sneaking into mod clubs in New York City, where I danced and people-watched until four in the morning. The first shows I went to were 60′s rock revivals and there was always an amazing rock & soul energy. That’s where my heart is and that’s the music I always wanted to make, but with a fresh feel. I remember being blown away the first time I heard Lauryn Hill’s ‘Doo Wop (That Thing)’–I was so happy that music could sound like that again.

-Chantal Claret on her new solo album

== Track listing ==
No.	Title	Length
1.	"Intro"	1:07
2.	"Bite Your Tongue"	2:41
3.	"Pleasure Seeker"	3:01
4.	"Pop Pop Bang Bang"	2:37
5.	"This Time"	3:25
6.	"No Love Lost"	3:18
7.	"Never Gonna Let You Go"	3:10
8.	"Real Girls"	3:18
9.	"Black Widow"	2:50
10.	"Honey Honey"	3:33
11.	"Song for the Sinners"	3:55
12.	"Light It Up (featuring Pigeon John)"	3:16
13.	"Can't Save Her"	4:23

== Personnel ==
=== Musicians ===
- Chantal Claret - vocals for all songs
- James Euringer - additional vocals in track 1
- Pigeon John - guest vocals in track 12
- Michael Goldstrom - guest vocals in track 13
- Rob Kleiner - additional vocals in tracks 4 & 10, bass, guitar, organ, percussion in tracks 2, 3, 4, 6, 8, 10 & 13(except track 13 for guitar)
- Carl Sondrol, John Whooley - horns in tracks 2, 3 and 8
- Mher Filian - bass, guitar, keys, percussion & programming in tracks 1, 7 and 11

=== Other ===
- Mark "Exit" Goodchild - mixing
- Randy Merrill - mastering
- ComicStrip Tease Music (BMI), Extra Credit Music (BMI) - publishing
- Nick Walker - photos
- Devin Toye - album layout
- Eddie Applebaum, Matt Vogel, The Greenhouse Management - management
- Michael Moses, BWR Public Relations - publicity
