= Morningwood (EP) =

EP by Morningwood
- Released: 2003
- Genre: Rock
- Label: Rockhardcock Records

Morningwood chronology
Morningwood (2003)	Sugarbaby (2008)

Morningwood is the first EP from American alternative rock band Morningwood. Released in 2003, the album was independently released by the ensemble on their own label named Rockhardcock Records.

== Critical reception ==
Alex Henderson of AllMusic states that the EP "epitomizes the more lighthearted, pleasure-loving side of alternative pop/rock" while going on to say that it "projects an attractive identity of its own -- one that is gritty and aggressive, yet poppy and melodic, one that shows a commitment to hooky infectiousness and owes something to hard rock as well as punk and new wave".

=== "Take Off Your Clothes" ===
Adam Moerder of Pitchfork Media states that "Take Off Your Clothes" "xeroxes "Smells Like Teen Spirit", subbing teen angst for locker room hormones". Jeanne Fury of The Village Voice describes the song as a "drunk dialogue between a horny, groveling Claret and a Sweet Action reject who wants to get acquainted first" while describing Chantal Claret as "being both the cooing, eyelash-batting sex kitten and the screaming, impatient mega-bitch in order to get her way right away".

=== "New York Girls" ===
Adam Moerder of Pitchfork Media states that "New York Girls" "spoils the album's best bassline with a shoutout straight from 'Bring It On'".

== Track listing ==
1. "Jetsetter" – 3:25
2. "One Track Mind" – 2:45
3. "Take Off Your Clothes" – 1:41
4. "Everybody Rules" – 2:57
5. "New York Girls" – 2:29
6. "Take Off Your Clothes (Remix)" – 3:06
