= Michael C. Hall =

American actor (born 1971)

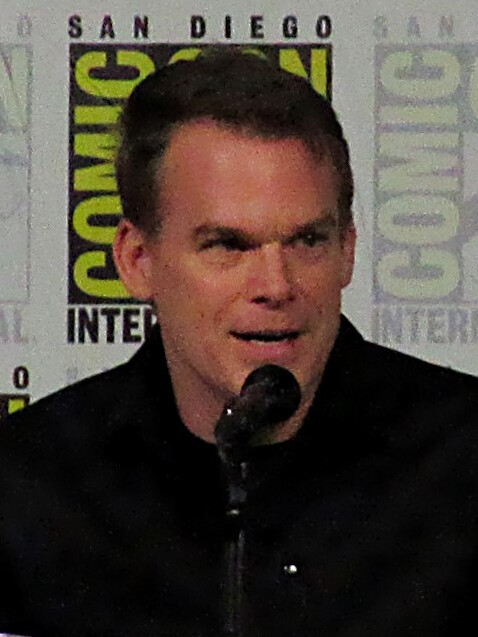
- Hall at the 2024 San Diego Comic-Con
- Born: Michael Carlyle Hall; February 1, 1971 (age 55); Raleigh, North Carolina, U.S.
- Education: Earlham College (BA); New York University (MFA)
- Occupations: Actor; musician
- Years active: 1995–present
- Spouses: Amy Spanger (m. 2002; div. 2006); Jennifer Carpenter (m. 2008; div. 2011); Morgan Macgregor (m. 2016)

Michael Carlyle Hall (born February 1, 1971) is an American actor and musician. He is best known for playing the role of the titular character in the Showtime series Dexter and David Fisher in the HBO black-comedy drama series Six Feet Under, which earned him two Actor Awards. For Dexter, Hall won a Golden Globe Award, an Actor Award and a Saturn Award. He has received six total nominations for the Primetime Emmy Award for Outstanding Lead Actor in a Drama Series, which ties the record for most nominations in the category without a win. He reprised his role of Dexter Morgan in Dexter: New Blood, Dexter: Resurrection, and performed internal monologue in Dexter: Original Sin.

Born and raised in Raleigh, North Carolina, Hall graduated from New York University's graduate acting program at the Tisch School of the Arts in 1996. He began his acting career on Broadway in the revival of Cabaret and appeared in a variety of shows throughout the 1990s. Aside from his roles on Six Feet Under and Dexter, he starred in the Broadway musical Hedwig and the Angry Inch and subsequently formed the band Princess Goes. He has starred in films including Paycheck, Gamer, Cold in July, Mark Felt: The Man Who Brought Down the White House, Game Night, and In the Shadow of the Moon.

== Early life and education ==
Michael C. Hall was born in Raleigh, North Carolina. His mother, Janice (née Styons) Hall, was a mental health counselor at Lees-McRae College, and his father, William Carlyle Hall, was a systems engineer manager for IBM. Hall had one older sister who died in infancy before his birth. His father died of prostate cancer in 1982 at the age of 39 when Hall was 11 years old. He has said of this, "There was a very one-on-one, immediate family relationship, my mom and I."

Hall discovered acting early in life: he performed in What Love Is when he was in second grade at Ravenscroft School in Raleigh, North Carolina. In fifth grade, he began singing, first in a boys' choir, and later, in high school, in musicals, performing in standards such as The Sound of Music, Oklahoma!, and Fiddler on the Roof. Hall graduated from Ravenscroft School in 1989 and enrolled at Earlham College, a liberal arts college in Richmond, Indiana. At Earlham, Hall continued acting, starring in Cabaret and other productions. Hall graduated from Earlham College with a Bachelor of Arts in 1993, despite recurring disagreements with Earlham director Samuel "Charles" Holmond. While he has said that he had planned to become a lawyer, he later acknowledged that he had never formed a serious intent to go to law school. Additionally, Hall graduated with a Master of Fine Arts from New York University's graduate acting program at the Tisch School of the Arts in 1996.

== Career ==
=== Early work ===
Hall's professional acting career began in the theater. Off-Broadway, he appeared in Macbeth and Cymbeline at the New York Shakespeare Festival; in Timon of Athens and Henry V at The Public Theater; The English Teachers at the Manhattan Class Company (MCC); and the controversial play Corpus Christi at the Manhattan Theatre Club. He also performed the role of Paris Singer in the workshop production of a Stephen Sondheim musical (titled Wise Guys at the time, and in later versions, Bounce and then Road Show. His character's songs and function were transferred to the character Hollis Bessamer in the final version.) In Los Angeles, Hall appeared in Skylight at the Mark Taper Forum. As part of the Texas Shakespeare Festival in the summer of 1995, he played Lancelot in Camelot, Lysander in A Midsummer Night's Dream, and Claudio in Much Ado About Nothing. In 1998, Hall performed in William Shakespeare's Cymbeline, in the role of Posthumus Leonatus, which ran from August 4 to 30. In 1999, director Sam Mendes cast Hall as the flamboyant Emcee in the revival of Cabaret; this was Hall's first Broadway role. Hall's film credits from this period include the thriller Paycheck (2003) and the science fiction thriller Gamer (2009).

=== 2000s ===
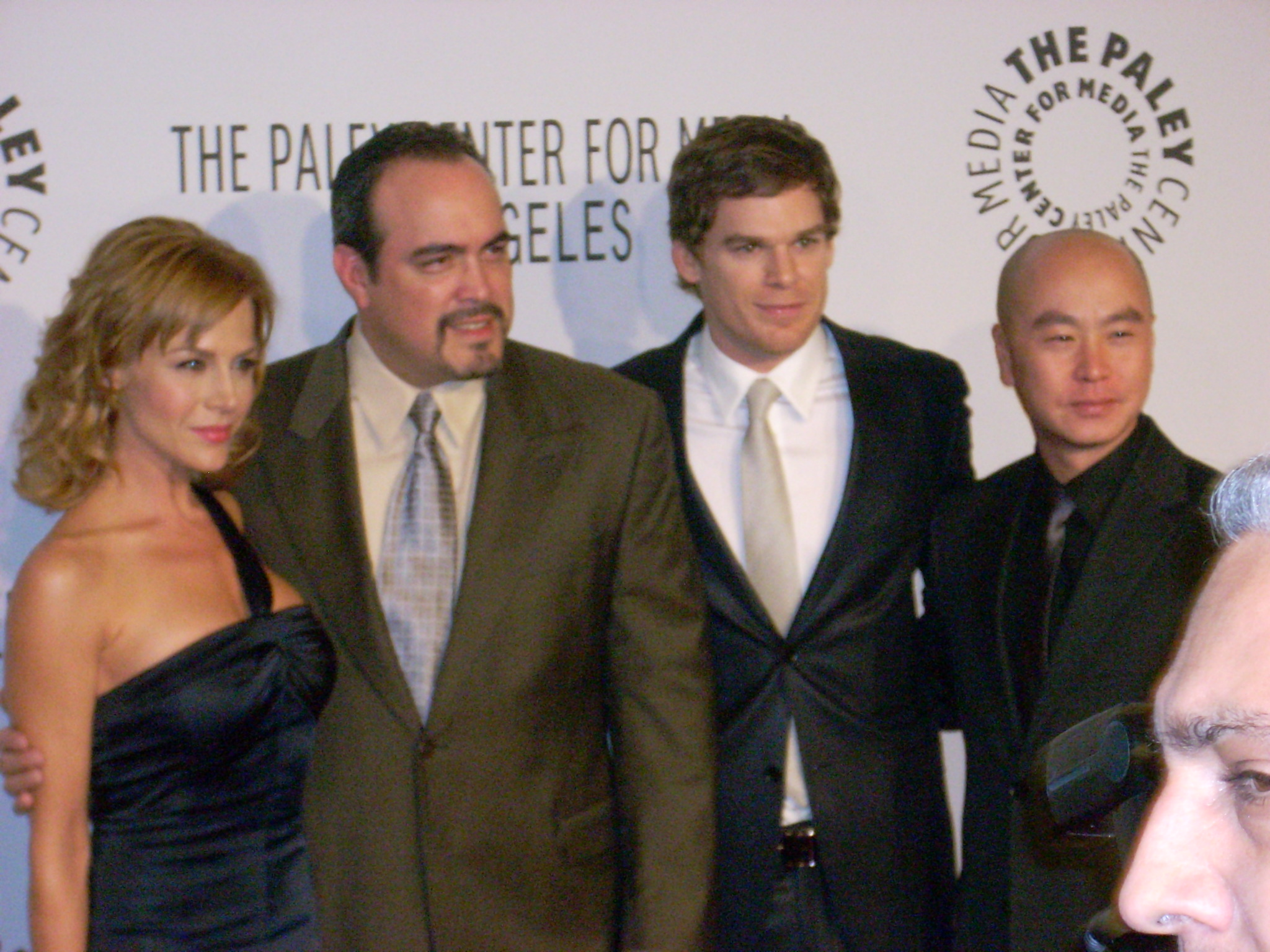
(L-R): Julie Benz, David Zayas, Michael C. Hall and C. S. Lee at the Paley Center for Media Gala Honoring Showtime Networks in 2008

Mendes suggested Hall for the role of closeted David Fisher, when Alan Ball began casting the TV drama Six Feet Under. "Everything opened up for me in Cabaret," but, Hall reported in a 2004 interview, "It slammed shut for David." Hall's work in the first season of Six Feet Under was recognized with a nomination for an Emmy Award for Outstanding Lead Actor in a Drama Series and for an AFI Award nomination for Actor of the Year in 2002. In addition, he shared in the Screen Actors Guild nominations for Outstanding Performance by an Ensemble in a Drama Series all five years that the show was in production, winning the award in 2003 and 2004. In 2003, Hall toured as Billy Flynn in the musical Chicago. In 2005, he returned to off-Broadway theater in the premiere of Noah Haidle's Mr. Marmalade, playing the title character, the imaginary friend of an emotionally disturbed little girl named Lucy.

Hall starred in and co-produced the Showtime television series Dexter, in which he played Dexter Morgan, a psychopathic blood-spatter analyst for the Miami Metro Police Department, who moonlights as a serial killer/vigilante. Jennifer Carpenter played his adoptive sister, Debra Morgan. The series premiered on October 1, 2006, and ended its run in 2013. After months of rumors, on April 18, 2013, Showtime announced via social media that season eight would be Dexter's final season. Hall also voiced Dexter Morgan in the animated web series Dexter: Early Cuts. For his work on Dexter, Hall was nominated for five Emmy Awards for Outstanding Lead Actor in a Drama Series from 2008 to 2012. The show itself was also nominated for Emmy citations in the Drama Series category in the same years. He won the 2007 Television Critics Association award for Individual Achievement in Drama at the 23rd TCA Awards. Hall was nominated for the Golden Globe Award for Best Performance by an Actor in a TV Drama in 2007 and 2008, and won in 2010 at the 67th Golden Globe Awards. Also in 2010, he won a Screen Actors Guild Award for Outstanding Performance by a Male Actor in a Drama Series at the 16th Screen Actor's Guild Awards.

=== 2010s ===
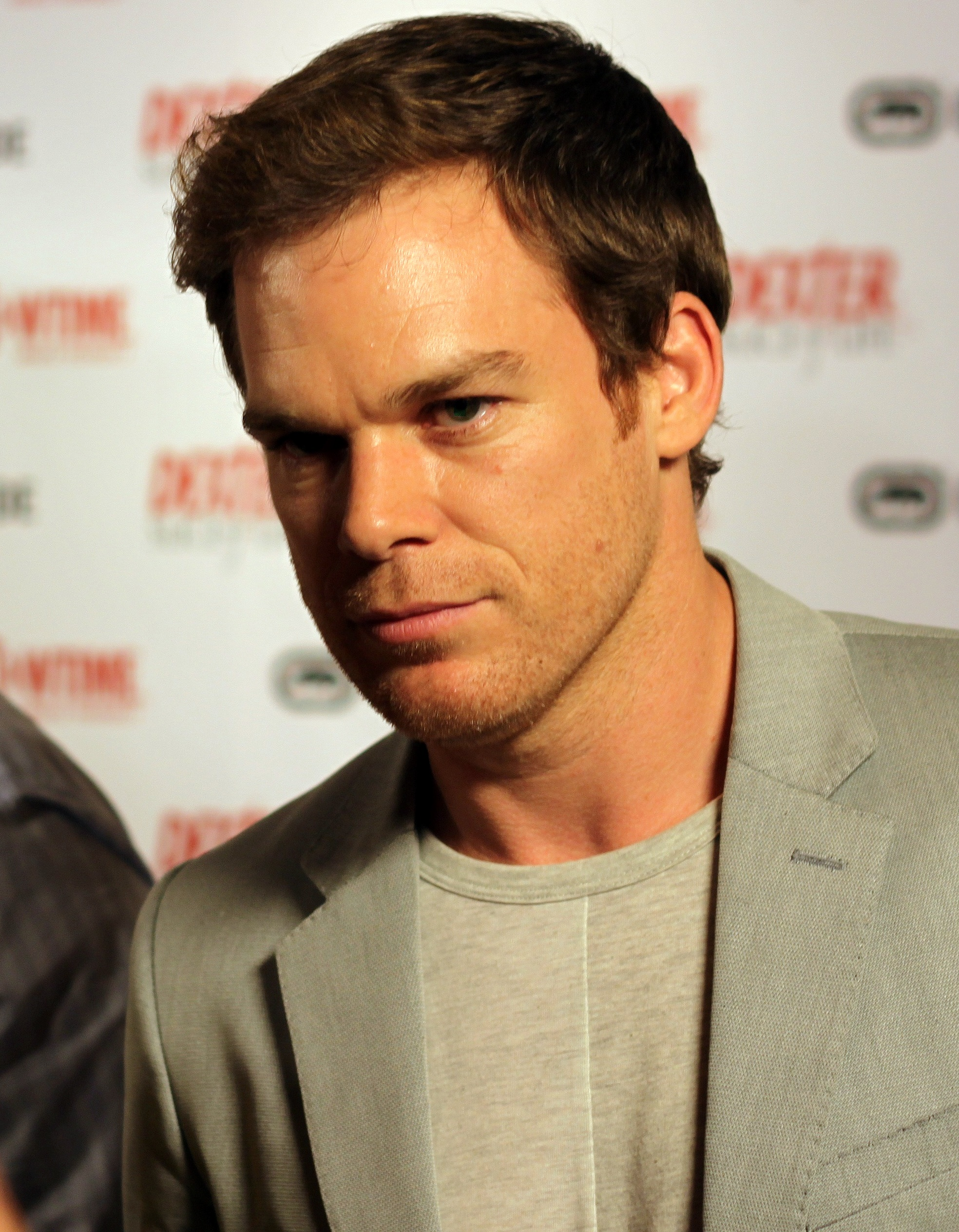
Hall in 2011

Hall's film credits include the 2011 drama The Trouble with Bliss (2011), the comedy Peep World (2012), and Kill Your Darlings (2013). Hall performed in a film adaptation of Joe R. Lansdale's cult novel Cold in July, directed by Jim Mickle. The film premiered at the 2014 Sundance Film Festival in Park City, Utah. Hall portrayed Abraham Lincoln's advisor, Leonard Swett, in the documentary film The Gettysburg Address. In 2014, he returned to Broadway in the play The Realistic Joneses, starring in the role of John Jones. He assumed the title role in Hedwig and The Angry Inch on Broadway on October 16, 2014, and performed the role until January 18, 2015. Hall returned to the role of Hedwig from February 17–21, 2015, to replace John Cameron Mitchell, who had a knee injury.

At the end of 2015 and the start of 2016, Hall starred as Thomas Newton in the NYTW stage production of Lazarus, created by David Bowie and Enda Walsh. Hall performed the song "Lazarus", which appeared on Bowie's final album, Blackstar (2016), on The Late Show with Stephen Colbert in December 2015. He later appeared in the London production from October 25, 2016, until January 22, 2017. In 2017, Hall played US President John F. Kennedy in season two, episode eight, "Dear Mrs Kennedy", of the Netflix historical drama The Crown, alongside actress Jodi Balfour as First Lady Jackie Kennedy.

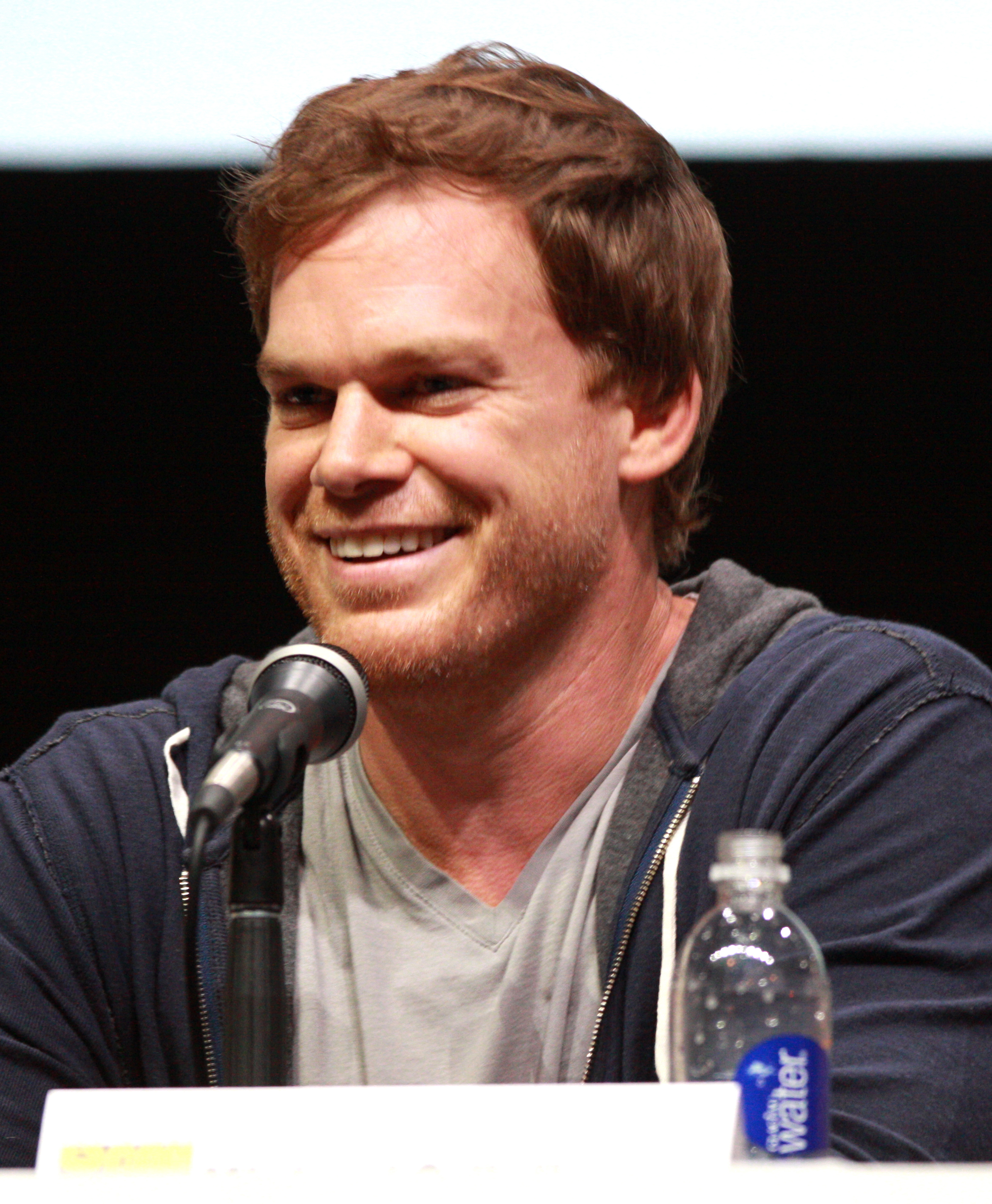
Hall at the 2013 San Diego Comic-Con

Hall starred as Tom Delaney, a British widower and doctor, in Safe, an eight-part Netflix original crime drama which premiered on May 10, 2018. Also in 2018, Hall starred as Thom Pain in the off-Broadway production of Thom Pain (based on nothing), a one-man show written by Will Eno. The show was directed by Oliver Butler for the Signature Theatre Company in New York City, and it ran from October 23, 2018, to December 9, 2018, after being extended twice. Also in 2018, Hall narrated the audiobook version of Stephen King's horror novel Pet Sematary. Since 2018, Hall has written for and performed in the NYC band, Princess Goes (formerly Princess Goes to the Butterfly Museum), alongside Matt Katz-Bohen and Peter Yanowitz. Hall met drummer Yanowitz while performing together in Hedwig and The Angry Inch. They struck up a friendship and soon began collaborating on songs with Katz-Bohen, who was also a member of the Hedwig cast.

On February 3, 2019, Hall starred as a fictionalized version of himself in the half-hour-long, one-time-only Broadway musical, Skittles Commercial: The Broadway Musical. That same year, Hall starred as Holt in the Netflix thriller film In the Shadow of the Moon. Hall voices the character Toffee in Daron Nefcy's Star vs. the Forces of Evil and also voiced Batman in Justice League: Gods and Monsters. Also in 2019, Hall starred alongside Martha Plimpton and Hamish Linklater in an episode of the theatre podcast Playing on Air, titled "Nudity Rider". In 2019, Princess Goes filmed their first music video for their song, "Ketamine", in Tarrytown, New York. The audio for the song was featured in the end credits for Dexter: New Blood episode 5 "Runaway", and "Ketamine" has been remixed by several artists on the Ketamine EP.

=== 2020s ===
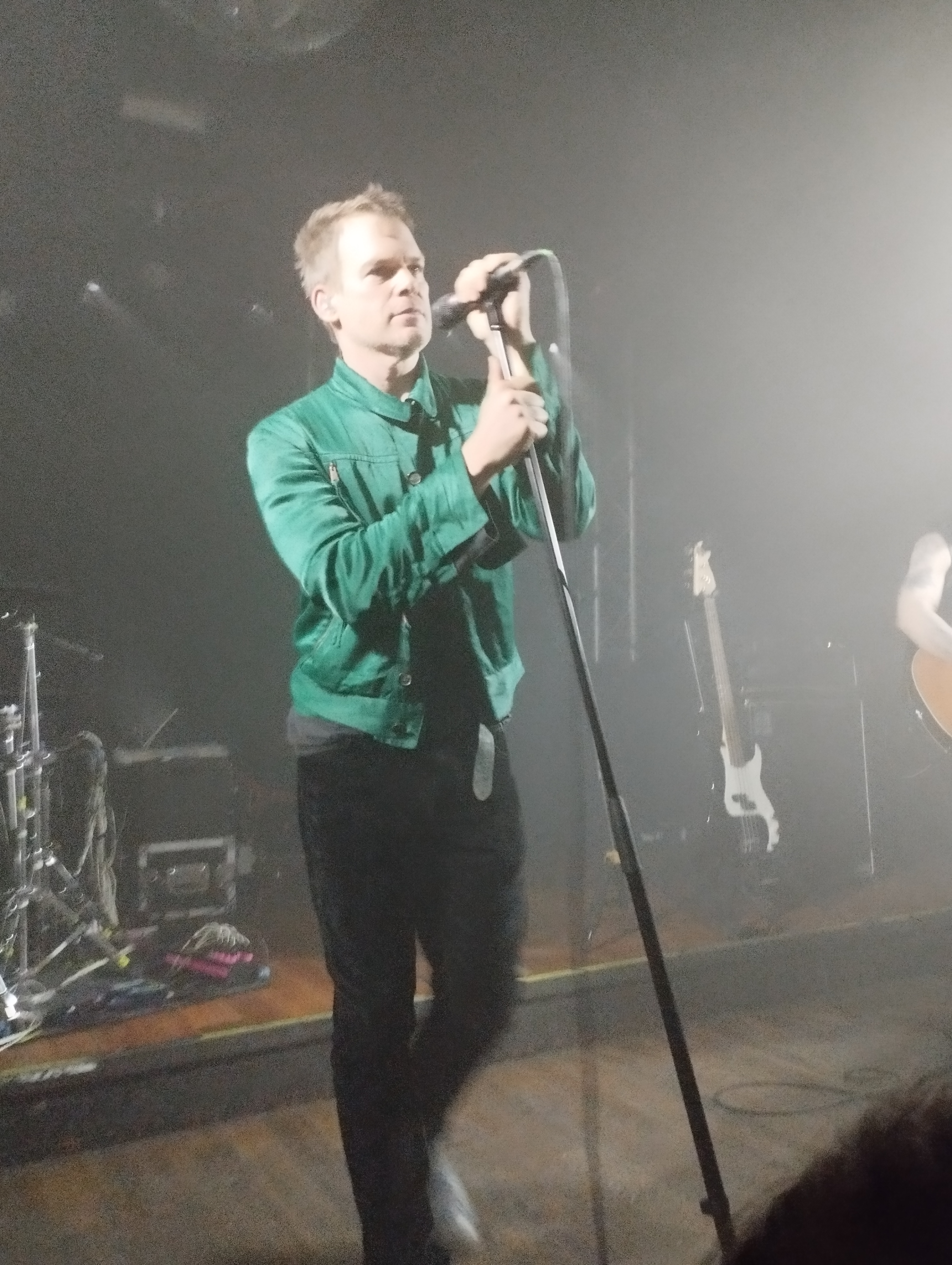
Hall performing with the band Princess Goes in 2023

Hall previously stated he would be open to returning for a Dexter spinoff series, but said: "I can't even wrap my mind around that. And it's all just theoretical until there is some sort of script reflecting somebody's idea of where it could possibly go. But it's hard for me to imagine what that would be. Yeah, as far as playing Dexter again for an undefined amount of time, that's a little daunting to consider. But doing another television series—there's a lot of amazing stuff on TV. I don't want to do that right away. But I wouldn't say never to that." He had said he would consider revisiting his role as the serial killer if something was written that he deemed "worth pursuing". Showtime president David Nevins said there had been discussions for a Dexter spinoff series that would take the character in a different direction and not continue the previous series. Nevins said they would only do the show if Hall agreed to return. In October 2020, Showtime confirmed that Hall would reprise his role of Dexter Morgan in a 10-episode limited series titled Dexter: New Blood, with Clyde Phillips returning as showrunner. The series premiered on November 7, 2021 and ended on January 9, 2022. The series finale was the most watched finale in the history of the network and set streaming records as well.

Princess Goes to the Butterfly Museum released their eponymous debut EP on April 2, 2020. In 2021, the band self released their first full-length album, Thanks for Coming. In 2023, the band released their second full-length album, Come of Age through So/In De Goot Recordings, simultaneously shortening their name to Princess Goes. On September 21, 2024, the band played Riot Fest in Chicago. Princess Goes has toured all over the globe and continues to record and perform their music.

== Personal life ==
In 2002, Hall married actress Amy Spanger. The summer after their wedding, Hall played Billy Flynn opposite Spanger's Roxie Hart in the Broadway musical Chicago. The pair divorced in 2006.

In 2007, Hall began dating his Dexter co-star Jennifer Carpenter. They eloped on New Year's Eve 2008 in California and publicly appeared together for the first time as a married couple at the 66th Golden Globe Awards in January 2009. In December 2010, Hall and Carpenter released a statement announcing that they had filed for divorce after having been separated "for some time". The divorce was granted for irreconcilable differences and finalized in December 2011; however, the two remain close friends.

In September 2012, Hall began dating Morgan Macgregor, an associate editor at the Los Angeles Review of Books, and they married on February 29, 2016.

On January 13, 2010, Hall's agent and spokesman confirmed that Hall was undergoing treatment for a form of Hodgkin's lymphoma. In an interview, Hall said that it was upsetting to learn of his cancer when he was 38 years old, as his father had died from cancer at age 39. Hall accepted his Golden Globe and Screen Actors Guild Award in 2010 while wearing a knitted cap over his bald head, having lost his hair due to chemotherapy, which he covered with a wig in season 5 of Dexter. On April 25, 2010, Carpenter announced that Hall's cancer was fully in remission and he was set to get back to work for the 6th season of Dexter.

Hall is the face of the Somalia Aid Society's "Feed the People" campaign. He has also worked with Kiehl's to promote a limited-edition skin care line that benefits Waterkeeper Alliance, an environmental nonprofit organization that works toward clean and safe water worldwide. In 2011, Hall was the celebrity spokesperson for the Leukemia & Lymphoma Society's "Light the Night Walk" fundraising campaign.

== Filmography ==
=== Film ===
Year	Title	Role	Notes
2003	Paycheck	Agent Klein	
2009	Gamer	Ken Castle	
2011	Peep World	Jack Meyerwitz	
2012	The Trouble with Bliss	Morris Bliss	
2013	Kill Your Darlings	David Kammerer	
2014	Cold in July	Richard Dane	
2015	Justice League: Gods and Monsters	Kirk Langstrom / Man-Bat	Voice, direct-to-video
2016	Christine	George Peter Ryan	
2016	After Adderall	Director	
2017	Mark Felt: The Man Who Brought Down the White House	John Dean	
2018	Game Night	The Bulgarian	
2019	The Report	Thomas Eastman	
2019	In the Shadow of the Moon	Det. Holt	
2021	John and the Hole	Bradley "Brad" Shay	

=== Television ===
Year	Title	Role	Notes
1999	As the World Turns	Jerry Klein	Season 1, Episode 10955
2001–2005	Six Feet Under	David Fisher	63 episodes
2004	Bereft	Jonathan	Television film
2006	Mysteries of the Freemasons	Narrator	Television film
2006–2013	Dexter	Dexter Morgan	96 episodes; also director for episode: Every Silver Lining...
2011	Vietnam in HD	Narrator	6 episodes
2012	Ruth & Erica	Tom	3 episodes
2014	Years of Living Dangerously	Himself	Episode: "A Dangerous Future"
2015	Justice League: Gods and Monsters Chronicles	Kirk Langstrom / Man-Bat	Voice, episode: "Twisted"
2015–2019	Star vs. the Forces of Evil	Toffee	Voice, 11 episodes
2017	The Crown	John F. Kennedy	Episode: "Dear Mrs. Kennedy"
2018	Safe	Dr. Tom Delaney	8 episodes; also executive producer
2019	Documentary Now!	Billy May "Dead Eyes" Dempsey	Episode: "Any Given Saturday Afternoon"
2020	The Defeated	Tom Franklin	8 episodes; Miniseries
2021–2022	Dexter: New Blood	Dexter Morgan	10 episodes; also executive producer
2024–2025	Dexter: Original Sin	Dexter Morgan	10 episodes (as inner voice); also executive producer
2025–present	Dexter: Resurrection	Dexter Morgan	14 episodes; also executive producer

=== Theater ===
Year	Title	Role	Venue
1996	Henry V	Earl of Warwick	Delacorte Theatre
1996	Timon of Athens	Caphis	Delacorte Theatre
1996	Skylight	Edward Sergeant	Bernard B. Jacobs Theatre
1998	Macbeth	Malcolm	The Public Theater
1998	Corpus Christi	Saint Peter	Manhattan Theatre Club
1998	Cymbeline	Posthumus Leonatus	Delacorte Theatre
1999–2000	Cabaret	Emcee	Studio 54
2002	Chicago	Billy Flynn	Richard Rodgers Theatre
2004	R Shomon	Morito/Thief/Reporter	Williamstown Theatre Festival
2005	Mr. Marmalade	Mr. Marmalade	Laura Pels Theatre
2014	The Realistic Joneses	John Jones	Lyceum Theatre
2014–2015	Hedwig and the Angry Inch	Hedwig	Belasco Theatre
2015–2017	Lazarus	Thomas Jerome Newton	New York Theatre Workshop; King's Cross Theatre
2018	Thom Pain (based on nothing)	Thom Pain	Signature Theatre Company
2019	Skittles Commercial: The Broadway Musical	Himself	Midtown Manhattan's Town Hall

=== Web series ===
Year	Title	Role	Notes
2011	CollegeHumor Originals	Bryan	1 episode: "Porn Rental"
2023	The Hacker Chronicles	John Doe	Voice, season 2

== Awards and nominations ==
Year	Association	Category	Nominated work	Result
2002	American Film Institute Awards	Male Actor of the Year in a Television Series	Six Feet Under	Nominated
2002	Primetime Emmy Awards	Outstanding Lead Actor in a Drama Series	Six Feet Under	Nominated
2002	Screen Actors Guild Awards	Outstanding Ensemble in a Drama Series	Six Feet Under	Nominated
2003	Screen Actors Guild Awards	Outstanding Ensemble in a Drama Series	Six Feet Under	Won
2004	Screen Actors Guild Awards	Outstanding Ensemble in a Drama Series	Six Feet Under	Won
2005	Monte-Carlo Television Festival	Outstanding Actor in a Drama Series	Six Feet Under	Won
2005	Screen Actors Guild Awards	Outstanding Ensemble in a Drama Series	Six Feet Under	Nominated
2006	Screen Actors Guild Awards	Outstanding Ensemble in a Drama Series	Six Feet Under	Nominated
2006	Satellite Awards	Best Actor – Television Series Drama	Dexter	Nominated
2007	Golden Globe Awards	Best Actor – Television Series Drama	Dexter	Nominated
2007	Satellite Awards	Best Actor – Television Series Drama	Dexter	Won
2007	Saturn Awards	Best Actor on Television	Dexter	Won
2007	Screen Actors Guild Awards	Outstanding Male Actor in a Drama Series	Dexter	Nominated
2007	Television Critics Association Awards	Individual Achievement in Drama	Dexter	Won
2008	Astra Awards	Favorite International Personality or Actor	Dexter	Nominated
2008	Golden Globe Awards	Best Actor – Television Series Drama	Dexter	Nominated
2008	Primetime Emmy Awards	Outstanding Lead Actor in a Drama Series	Dexter	Nominated
2008	Satellite Awards	Best Actor – Television Series Drama	Dexter	Nominated
2008	Saturn Awards	Best Actor on Television	Dexter	Nominated
2008	Screen Actors Guild Awards	Outstanding Male Actor in a Drama Series	Dexter	Nominated
2008	Screen Actors Guild Awards	Outstanding Ensemble in a Drama Series	Dexter	Nominated
2009	Golden Globe Awards	Best Actor – Television Series Drama	Dexter	Nominated
2009	Primetime Emmy Awards	Outstanding Lead Actor in a Drama Series	Dexter	Nominated
2009	Saturn Awards	Best Actor on Television	Dexter	Nominated
2009	Screen Actors Guild Awards	Outstanding Male Actor in a Drama Series	Dexter	Nominated
2009	Screen Actors Guild Awards	Outstanding Ensemble in a Drama Series	Dexter	Nominated
2010	Golden Globe Awards	Best Actor – Television Series Drama	Dexter	Won
2010	Monte-Carlo Television Festival	Outstanding Actor in a Drama Series	Dexter	Won
2010	Primetime Emmy Awards	Outstanding Lead Actor in a Drama Series	Dexter	Nominated
2010	Satellite Awards	Best Actor – Television Series Drama	Dexter	Nominated
2010	Saturn Awards	Best Actor on Television	Dexter	Nominated
2010	Screen Actors Guild Awards	Outstanding Male Actor in a Drama Series	Dexter	Won
2010	Screen Actors Guild Awards	Outstanding Ensemble in a Drama Series	Dexter	Nominated
2011	Golden Globe Awards	Best Actor – Television Series Drama	Dexter	Nominated
2011	Monte-Carlo Television Festival	Outstanding Actor in a Drama Series	Dexter	Nominated
2011	Primetime Emmy Awards	Outstanding Drama Series	Dexter	Nominated
2011	Primetime Emmy Awards	Outstanding Lead Actor in a Drama Series	Dexter	Nominated
2011	Saturn Awards	Best Actor on Television	Dexter	Nominated
2011	Screen Actors Guild Awards	Outstanding Male Actor in a Drama Series	Dexter	Nominated
2011	Screen Actors Guild Awards	Outstanding Ensemble in a Drama Series	Dexter	Nominated
2012	Primetime Emmy Awards	Outstanding Lead Actor in a Drama Series	Dexter	Nominated
2012	Saturn Awards	Best Actor on Television	Dexter	Nominated
2012	Screen Actors Guild Awards	Outstanding Male Actor in a Drama Series	Dexter	Nominated
2013	Saturn Awards	Best Actor on Television	Dexter	Nominated
2014	Drama Desk Awards	Outstanding Ensemble Performance	The Realistic Joneses	Won
2016	Lucille Lortel Awards	Outstanding Lead Actor in a Musical	Lazarus	Nominated
2016	Drama League Awards	Distinguished Performance	Lazarus	Nominated
2016	Drama Desk Awards	Outstanding Lead Actor in a Musical	Lazarus	Nominated
2017	WhatsOnStage Awards	Best Actor in a Musical	Lazarus	Nominated
2022	Saturn Awards	Best Actor on Television	Dexter: New Blood	Nominated

== See also ==
- List of select cases of Hodgkin's Disease
