= Lisa Davies =

American former model

Lisa Ann Davies
- Born: October 10, 1981 (age 43); Florida, U.S.
- Spouse: Peter Yanowitz
- Modeling information
- Height: 5 ft 9.5 in (1.77 m)
- Hair color: Blonde
- Eye color: Green

Lisa Ann Davies (born October 10, 1981) is an American former model.

== Early years ==
Davies began modeling at the age of sixteen after being discovered by an agent while she was eating pizza in a Daytona Beach mall. Shortly afterwards, she landed a contract with the Ford Modeling Agency.

== Modeling career ==
Davies has been featured in advertising campaigns for Marc by Marc Jacobs, Emporio Armani, Nicole Miller, Burberry, Air France and Siemens Mobile, and has walked runways for brands such as Chanel, Louis Vuitton, Balenciaga, Dolce & Gabbana, Alexander McQueen, Givenchy, Lanvin, Salvatore Ferragamo, Issey Miyake and Cavalli.

== Personal life ==
Davies earned a Bachelor of Science in Nursing from the Hunter-Bellevue School of Nursing in 2010 and currently works as a nurse in New York City. She is married to musician Peter Yanowitz.
