= Rob Locke =

Actor, television host and voice-over artist (born 1971)

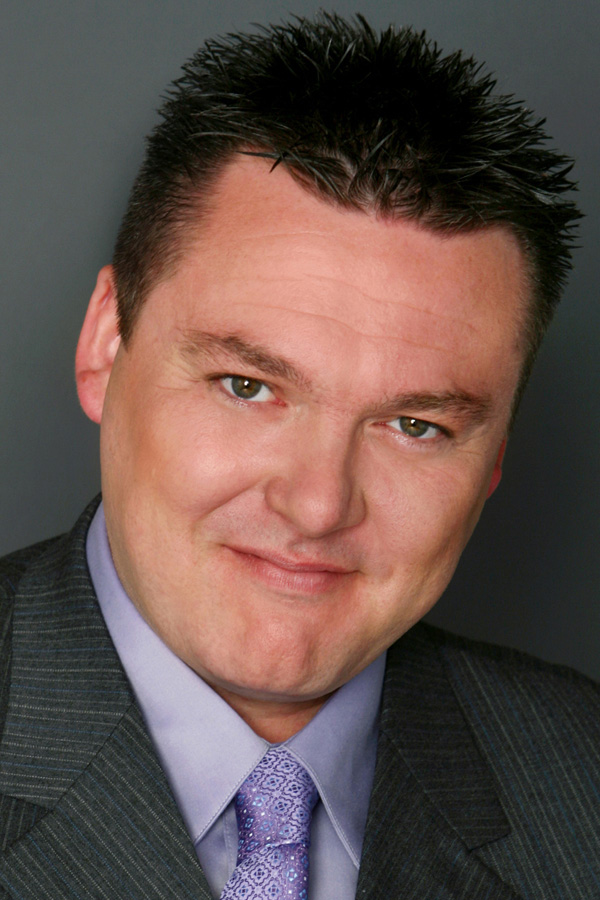
- Born: 7 October 1971 (age 54); Lincoln, Lincolnshire, England, UK
- Occupations: Actor; Voice-over artist Television host Talk show host Game show host
- Years active: 1992–present
- Website: roblocke.com

Rob Locke is a British and American actor, television host and voice-over artist, based in Los Angeles and London.

== Biography ==
Locke was born in Lincoln, Lincolnshire, on 7 October 1971 and grew up in London. His first acting experience was a school play, at the age of six, after which he performed regularly in youth theatre.

At the age of eighteen, he left school and started working in the television industry. In 1992 Locke began acting in children's TV. For the ensuing five years he was a regular on several shows for the Children's Channel (TCC), where he also hosted live interstitial programs and game show segments. In 1996 he guest-starred on Words and Pictures alongside Sophie Aldred, whom he had previously worked with at the Children's Channel.

In 1998 and 1999, Locke's hosted his own regional talk show called The Locke Exchange, alongside a daytime current affairs show and late-night music series. This was in addition to seven years as one of QVC UK's prime-time hosts between 1995 and 2002.

Locke emigrated to the United States in 2003. There he worked on Team Butkus Life Performance (a talk show he developed and co-hosted with Dick Butkus in 2006). In 2007 Locke returned to live television as a prime-time host on GemsTV USA.

At the end of 2008, Locke moved to Los Angeles. There he guest-starred on Spike TV's 1000 Ways to Die and GSN's Instant Recall pilot, making his film debut in the independent feature Cinema Salvation, and starring as Niles in 2009 VH1 series Megan Wants a Millionaire.

In 2010, Locke starred in a national commercial for Microsoft to launch Internet Explorer 8 in Britain, hosted a pilot for the poker-based game show Call the Floorman, recurred as a BP executive on ABC's Jimmy Kimmel Live!, narrated the VH1 series You're Cut Off!, and played the science correspondent in History's pilot Breaking News.

In 2011, Locke was again narrator for season 2 of VH1's You're Cut Off!, returned to ABC's Jimmy Kimmel Live! as the voice of Colin Firth, became the national TV spokesman for NET10 Wireless, and co-anchored Prius Records (a 2-day live webcast for Toyota Prius). He appeared in a viral video for the Sony Ericsson Xperia Play, played the British news anchor in EA's live-action trailer for Mass Effect 3, and voiced additional characters in the video game The Elder Scrolls V: Skyrim. Locke also co-starred as a Czech mobster in the season 2 finale of NCIS: Los Angeles on CBS, played supporting roles in the feature films Default, Spanners and I Love Your Moves, and starred as a psychopathic London gangster in the feature film Geezas.

At the beginning of 2012, Locke was cast as Niko in the pilot of ABC's mid-season sitcom Family Tools, starring Leah Remini, J.K. Simmons and Kyle Bornheimer.

From 16 April 2015 to 18 April, Locke was the narrator for the Old Spice Nature Adventure, a live action video game experience on Twitch.tv.

In 2017, Locke appeared in a single episode of 2 Broke Girls, appeared in various roles on Jimmy Kimmel Live!, made three appearances as Father Stanislov on General Hospital, and as Viktor Lopuchin in a single episode of NCIS.
