= Erica Rose (television personality) =

American lawyer, and reality TV personality (born 1983)

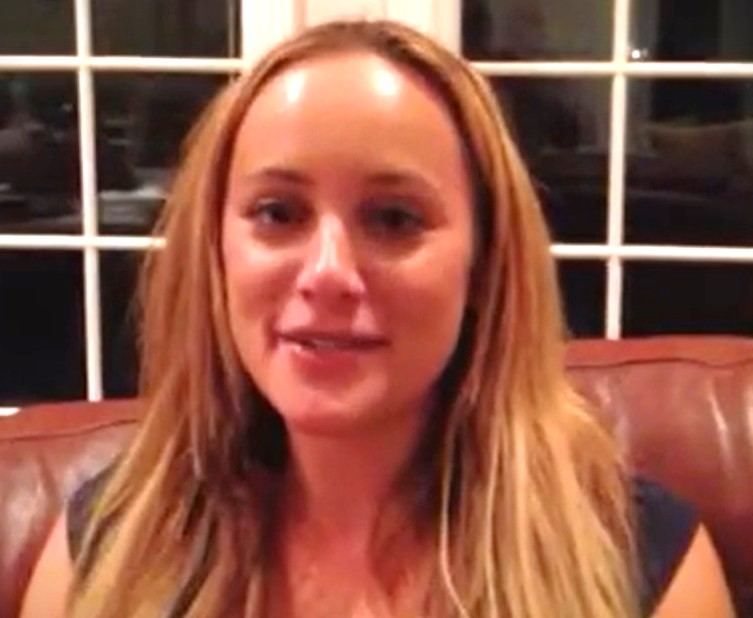
Rose in 2013

Erica Rose is an American lawyer, and reality TV personality known for her roles in the American TV series The Bachelor, Bachelor Pad, Below Deck Sailing Yacht and You're Cut Off!.

== Early life and career ==
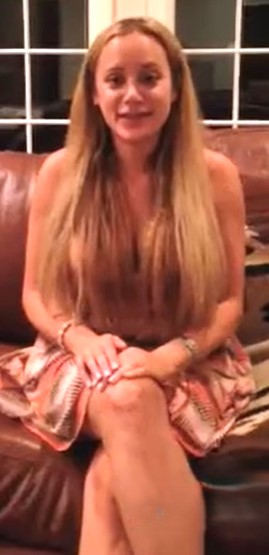
Rose in 2013

Erica Rose was born in Houston, Texas, United States, and attended The Kinkaid School and graduated from Emory University where she graduated with a dual major in English and Creative Writing and a minor in Theater. While attending Emory, Rose was a member of the Alpha Epsilon Phi and was the sports editor and a staff writer for The Emory Wheel.

In 2012, she received a Doctor of Jurisprudence degree from University of Houston Law Center. also has an LLM degree in Entertainment and Media Law from the Southwestern Law School in California. Rose founded the Rose Sanders Law Firm, a Texas based family law and personal injury law firm.

== Personal life ==
On December 3, 2017, after only three months of being engaged, she married Charles "Chuck" Sanders, whom she met in high school before her reality TV career started.

Erica and Charles' wedding featured Erica's friends and colleagues from the Bachelor franchise; including, Vienna Girardi, Tara Durr and her husband John Presser, Cory Shivar, Melissa Schreiber, Renee Simlak, Jeannette Pawula, AshLee Frazier Williams and even Prince Lorenzo Borghese who was the Bachelor on Erica's season. Erica and Charles have a daughter named Aspen Rose Sanders. Erica also has a daughter from a previous relationship named Holland Rose Madeleine.

== Reality TV career ==
Rose made her reality TV debut in 2006 as a contestant on the 9th season of The Bachelor.

In 2010, Rose debuted on the TV series You're Cut Off!. The series focused on nine wealthy women who were told they were going to be featured on a fake television production called The Good Life. However, they were later told that their families had "cut them off" from their spending money, and that they were participating in an eight-week program, which introduced them to a simpler lifestyle.

In 2011, Rose debuted on the TV series Bachelor Pad. She was the subject of controversy as a result of the series involving an episode where eggs where thrown at her in a challenge on an episode of Bachelor Pad season 3.

Rose recalled a notable challenge she said was both emotionally traumatic and physically hurtful: "Target on Your Back." The challenge involved the men and then the women lining up blindfolded in either swim trunks or bikinis. With their backs turned, each member of the other group was given a question and tasked with answering by throwing a paint-filled egg at whichever contestant was their answer to the question. They received a point if they hit their target and the person with the most points won.

In 2021, Rose debuted on the TV series Below Deck Sailing Yacht. Rose appeared on season two with her friends. In 2022, Rose reappeared in season three alongside her husband, family and friends. Erica and Chuck's charter left a $6500 tip after criticizing chef Marcos Spaziani's food. Chuck complained that McDonald's tasted better than the chef's preparation. Some considered Erica and Chuck to be "the worst guests in Below Deck Sailing Yacht history."

== Filmography ==
Year	Title	Notes
2021–2022	Below Deck Sailing Yacht	TV series
2016	Married to Medicine: Houston	TV series
2016	The Bachelor at 20: A Celebration of Love	TV special
2015	The Playboy Morning Show	TV series
2013	Inside Edition	Documentary
2013	Katie	TV series
2011–2012	Bachelor Pad	Contestant- Season Two & Season Three
2010	Dr. Phil	TV series
2010	The Wendy Williams Show	TV series
2010	You're Cut Off	Contestant- Season One
2009	Youth Knows No Pain	Documentary
2008	Battle of the Bods	TV series
2006	VH1 Big in 06 Awards	TV special
2006	The Ellen DeGeneres Show	TV series
2006–2012	The Bachelor	Contestant- Season 9
