= Andrew Baldwin =

American Navy officer, athlete, humanitarian and physiscian (born 1977)

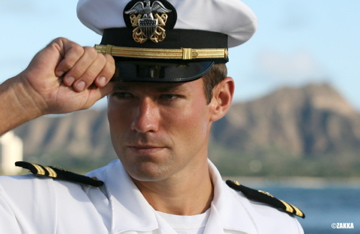
- Born: Andrew James Baldwin; February 5, 1977 (age 49); Lancaster, Pennsylvania, U.S.
- Education: Duke University; University of California, San Francisco
- Occupations: US Naval Officer, physician
- Height: 6 ft 0 in (183 cm)
- Parent(s): Roy and Cindy Baldwin

Andrew James Baldwin (born February 5, 1977) is a U.S. Navy officer, ironman triathlete, television personality, humanitarian, and physician. He appeared on the 10th season of the reality dating show The Bachelor. He is currently married with one son.

== Early life and education ==
Baldwin was born on February 5, 1977, in Lancaster, Pennsylvania, the son of Roy E. Baldwin, a former two-term Pennsylvania State Representative (R-97th District), and Cynthia Laulani Baldwin, a high school mathematics teacher. He has a brother and sister.

Baldwin graduated as valedictorian of Manheim Township High School in 1995. He worked as a paper boy, lifeguard, and had his own lawn mowing business to earn money for college, saving $25,000 before graduating high school. During high school, he played basketball, tennis, football, baseball, and was an All-American swimmer. He was named ESPN's National Scholar Athlete of the Year in 1995.

Baldwin attended Duke University, where he graduated magna cum laude in 1999 with a Bachelor of Science degree in biology. While at Duke, he was a varsity swimmer, member of the Pi Kappa Alpha fraternity, and a Navy Reserve Officer Training Corps midshipman.

== Career ==
After graduating from Duke University, Baldwin was commissioned an ensign in the United States Navy and received a four-year Navy Health Professions Scholarship to attend the University of California, San Francisco School of Medicine, receiving his M.D. in 2003. He subsequently completed an internship in general surgery at the Naval Medical Center San Diego, in 2004, and was a medical officer for Naval Special Warfare Group Three in Coronado from June to December 2004. He completed the Navy Undersea Medicine Training Institute and Navy Dive School in June 2005. In July 2005, he was given a three-year assignment as a member of the Navy Medical Corps to serve as Diving Medical Officer for Mobile Diving and Salvage Unit One in Pearl Harbor, Oahu, Hawaii.

On November 13, 2007, he told KITV that he was shortly to be deployed to Bahrain. Marianas Variety, Micronesia's leading newspaper, recorded that he "is part of the Joint POW/MIA Accounting Command (JPAC) team conducting recovery operations in Palau."

In April 2008, Baldwin was transferred from Hawaii to Washington, D.C., where he is a Navy medicine advocate at the Bureau of Medicine and Surgery. In January 2009, Baldwin began working as assistant to the acting U.S. Surgeon General, RADM Steven Galson on his "Healthy Youth for a Healthy Future" initiative combating childhood overweight and obesity.

In March 2009, Baldwin was selected as a finalist but was not selected for the White House Fellows program. Baldwin is a Board Certified Family Physician and an MPH Graduate Student at the Johns Hopkins School of Public Health.

=== Humanitarian efforts ===
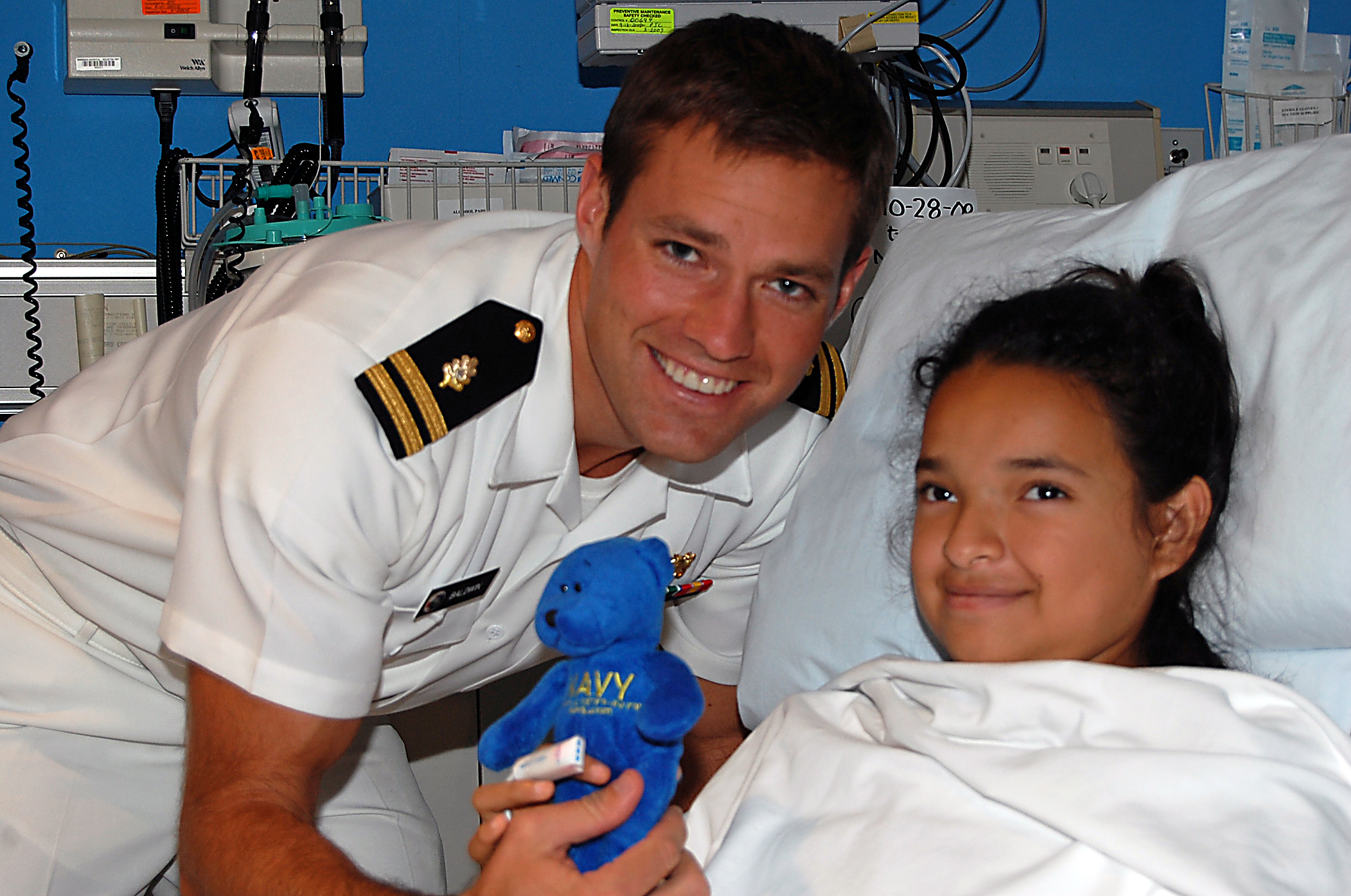
Baldwin visiting a patient in Shriners Hospital for Children in Houston

Baldwin was awarded Humanitarian of the Year by Competitor Magazine at the Competitor Sports Awards. He was named to Outside magazine's top 100 influential people of the world list in 2006, and to the Washington, D.C. Most Influential People under 40 List in 2009.

Baldwin was awarded Triathlete Magazine Humanitarian of 2007 by Triathlete Magazine. Baldwin was also placed on Outside magazine's list of the world's most influential people for the humanitarian work he did in Laos on a military mission where he treated over 600 Laotians in remote mountain villages for ailments such as malaria, dengue fever, parasites, and malnutrition. Baldwin also volunteered at the Aloha Medical Mission where he treated patients, free of charge, for various ailments.

Baldwin participated in ABC's Extreme Makeover: Home Edition, building a new home for the Akana family in Hawaii.

Baldwin established The Got Your Back Network, a nonprofit organization that raises money to support the families of the service men and women who gave their lives while serving their country. 100% of the funds raised fund an endowment to provide financial support for applicant families: education, emergencies and medicine.

Baldwin is now focusing on more humanitarian works. He has been involved in numerous charities including the TV Special Stand Up to Cancer, winning the Malibu Triathlon raising money for the Children's Hospital Los Angeles, Best Buddies, Snowball Express, etc.

== The Bachelor ==
Prior to being selected as a participant in The Bachelor, Baldwin was featured as an eligible California bachelor in Cosmopolitan in 2005.

The 10th season of the show, The Bachelor: Officer and a Gentleman, premiered Monday, April 2, 2007, on the ABC television network. Baldwin proposed to Tessa Horst on the season finale, which aired May 21, 2007. She accepted his proposal. Eight months after the final episode, Horst broke up with Baldwin when he was on deployment in the Pacific.

In June 2008, People named Andy Baldwin one of its hottest bachelors for 2008.

== Other projects ==
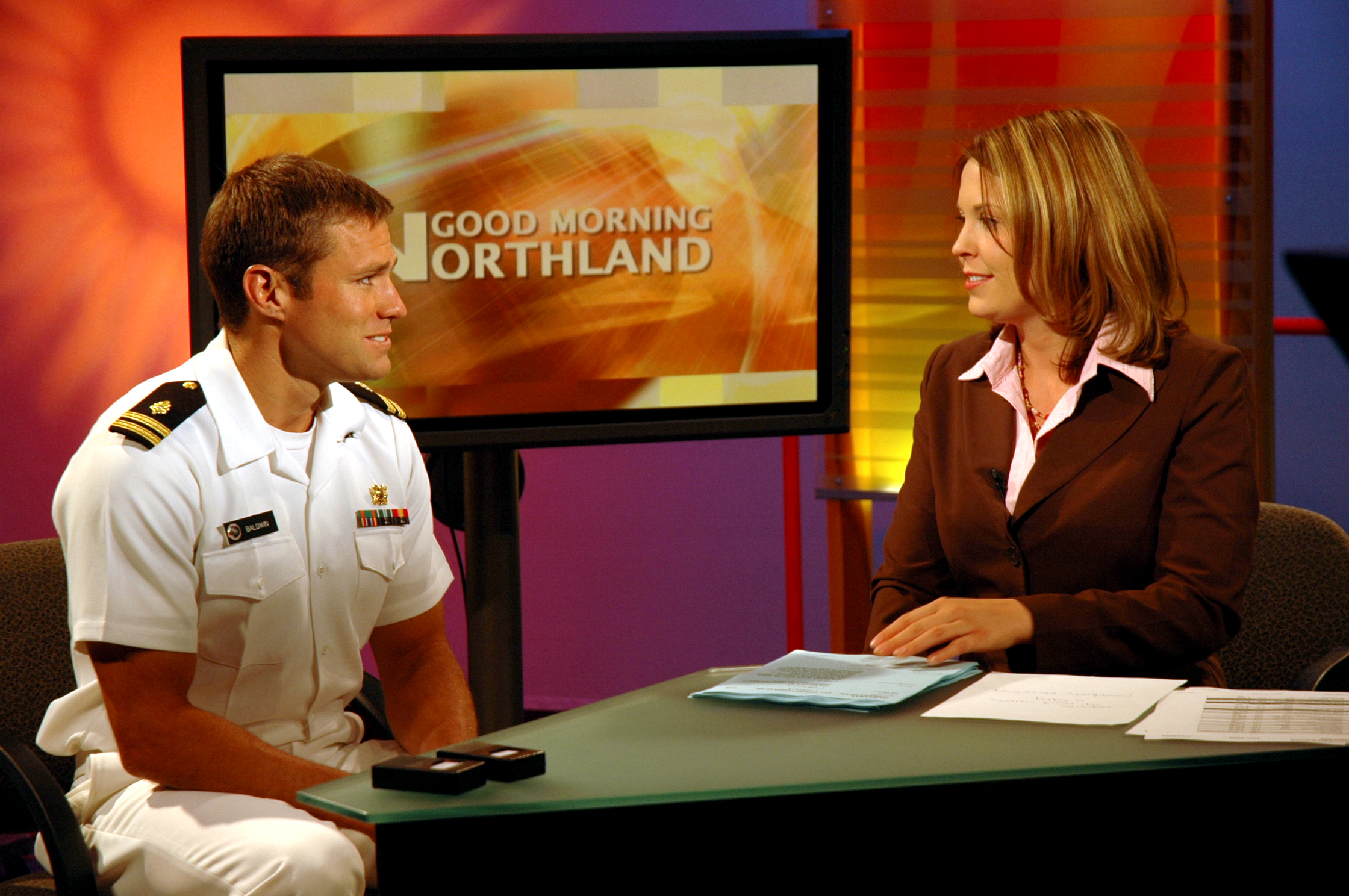
Baldwin in 2008

Honolulu Mayor Mufi Hannemann officially declared October 12 as Andy Baldwin Youth Fitness Day in the City and County of Honolulu.

In October 2009, Baldwin led a Health Ride across Pennsylvania with his father, speaking at elementary schools about the importance of physical activity.

Baldwin is the founder of Got Your Back Network, an organization that assists military families who have lost a spouse or parent in Operation Iraqi Freedom or Operation Enduring Freedom. The goal of Got Your Back Network is to "give comfort, answer a special need, offer guidance and bring a brighter day to these families."

On May 30, 2010, Baldwin ran 56 miles in South Africa, the Comrades Ultramarathon, as key member of Team World Vision securing sponsorships for children in need in Africa, Haiti, and other underdeveloped countries.

In June 2010, Baldwin made an appearance on the premiere of Top Chef in Washington, D.C.

On February 1, 2011, Baldwin was named National Ambassador for the ING Kids Rock running program which gets kids involved in running and helps fight childhood obesity.

== Triathlons ==
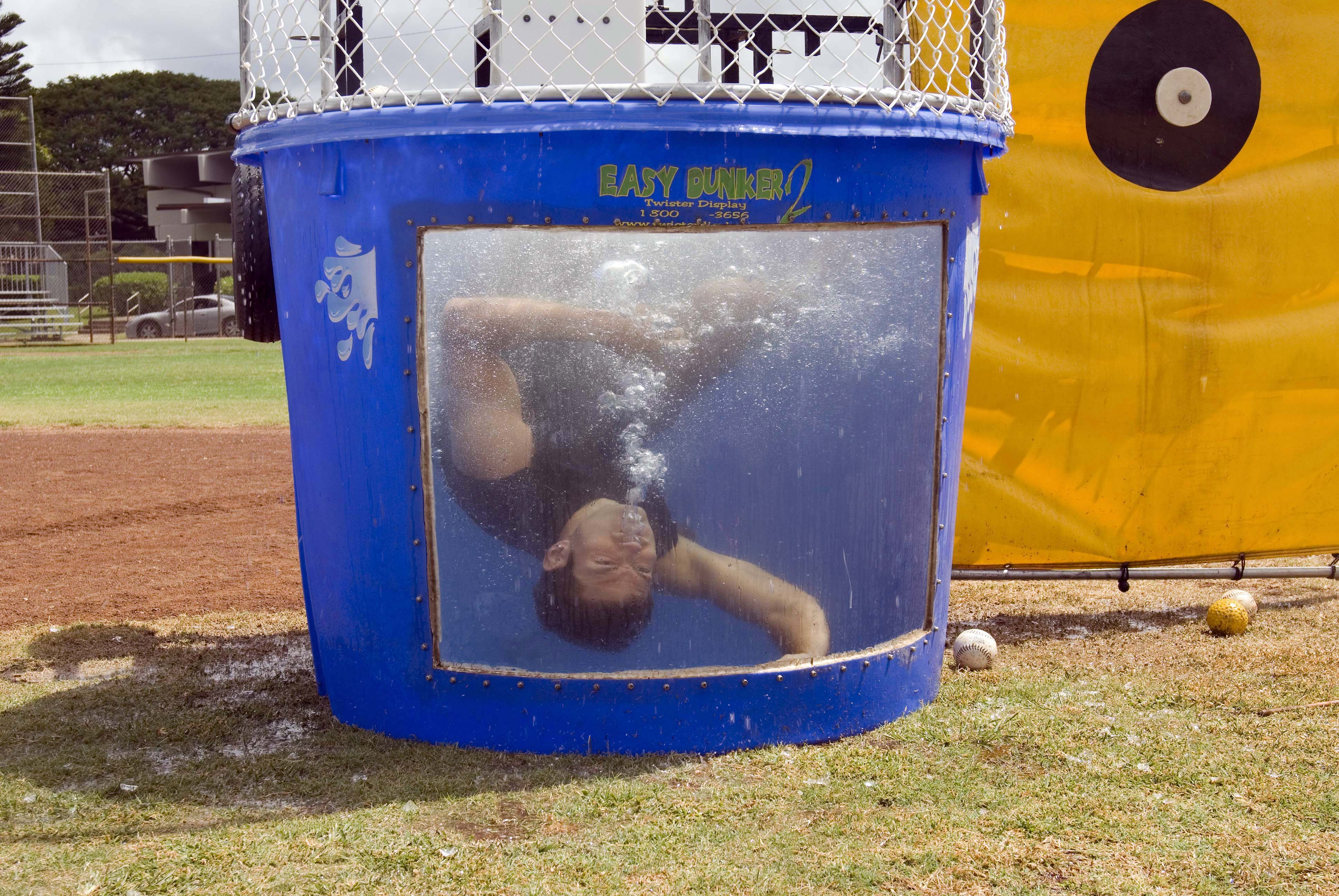
Baldwin in a dunk tank during a 2007 U.S. Navy event

Baldwin has been named to the All-Navy triathlon team five times, been a three-time U.S.A. Triathlon All-American, and competed internationally in numerous Half-Ironman and Ironman events. He is an eight-time Ironman finisher. In addition, he completed the 2013 New York City Marathon with a time of 3:18:13.

In 2015, Challenge Family Triathlons announced its partnership with Dr. Andy Baldwin. He will serve as an ambassador for the brand and compete in Challenge Family Americas races Challenge Family Americas board member Charlie Patten insists, “Andy is the real deal' a humanitarian and health care provider who serves his country and the world at large with generosity of heart and an indomitable spirit, lending a caring hand to US veterans and delivering critical medical care to those in need around the world.

In 2024, Professional Triathletes Organization named Dr. Baldwin its first Medical Director. In this role, Dr. Baldwin will oversee the coordination and implementation of PTO’s Medical Team programs, ensuring uniformity in the execution of the PTO’s medical plan and continuity of care and service across all events. He will also collaborate closely with World Triathlon to align PTO’s policies, procedures, and protocols with those of the global triathlon community.

Preceded by Prince Lorenzo Borghese	The Bachelor; Season 10	Succeeded by Brad Womack
