= Morningwood =

American alternative rock band

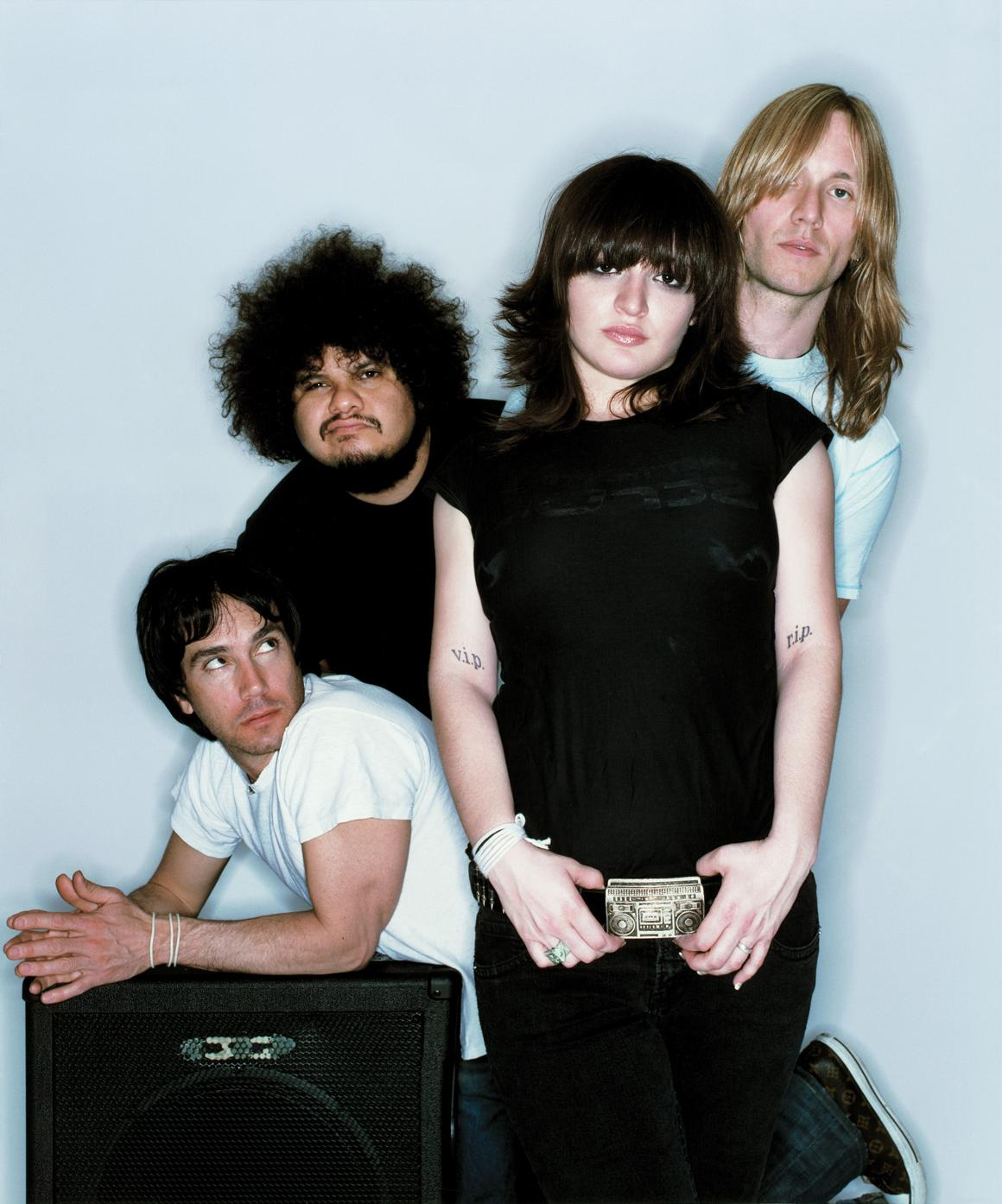
- From left to right: Pedro Yanowitz, Alfredo Ortiz, Chantal Claret, Phillip Shouse

Background information
- Origin: New York City, New York, United States
- Genres: Alternative rock, dance-rock, electropunk, power pop
- Years active: 2001–2012
- Labels: Capitol Records, VH1 Records
- Past members: Chantal Claret; Pedro Yanowitz; Alfredo Ortiz; Japa Keenon; Timo Ellis; Phillip Shouse; Richard Steel

Morningwood was an alternative rock band from New York City. Founded in 2001, it primarily consisted of Pedro Yanowitz and Chantal Claret. Morningwood was signed to Capitol Records and released two albums. Claret went solo in 2012 and folded the band.

== Career ==
Morningwood's self-titled debut album was produced by Gil Norton, known for his work with Pixies, the Foo Fighters, and Echo & the Bunnymen. Singles from the album include "Nth Degree", "Jetsetter" and "New York Girls." In support of the album, the band toured with Mindless Self Indulgence, Head Automatica, Gang of Four, Kasabian, The Sounds and The FireTheft on various legs of their US tour in 2006.

Their song "Nth Degree" has been used in several Mercury vehicle commercials, which featured actress Jill Wagner. Another of their songs, "Nü Rock," was used in the video games Burnout Revenge, SSX on Tour, while "Nth Degree" was used for Thrillville. A demo version of a Morningwood song called "Warrior" was used in a Payless ShoeSource TV spot. Morningwood received national exposure in the United States as a finalist in December 2005 Yahoo.com's Who's Next. They appeared three times on the Late Show with David Letterman, twice each on Last Call with Carson Daly, CD USA, and Jimmy Kimmel Live! and once on The Tonight Show. They played live at the MTV Studios at midnight for the Human Giant 24 hour marathon. In 2008, the song "New York Girls" was used in the popular Sex and the City movie. Morningwood's popular song "Best of Me" is featured as the theme song for VH1's Daisy of Love, and has been remixed by Jimmy Urine of Mindless Self Indulgence and also Kevvy Mental (Kevin James Maher) of Fake Shark - Real Zombie!.

In August 2008, the band finished work on a new album. The album, Diamonds & Studs, was released October 27, 2009 by VH1 Records, a record company started by VH1 and owned by Viacom. Morningwood was their first and only act.

Shortly after Claret's video for "Snobby Little Elf" premiered on YouTube, the band split for an indefinite hiatus. They regrouped in March 2012 to join Mindless Self Indulgence on a final tour. The band's final show was on March 11 at Irving Plaza in New York City. Since the disbanding, Claret has started a solo career while Yanowitz has started work on a Broadway musical.

Their song "Sugarbaby" is used as the theme song to VH1's reality series You're Cut Off!

== Band members ==
- Chantal Claret – vocals
- Peter "Pedro" Yanowitz – bass, backing vocals

== Touring members ==
- Will Tendy – guitars
- Jonathan Schmidt – drums
- Jeremy Asbrock – guitars

== Discography ==
=== Studio albums ===
Year	Album details	Chart Positions	
Year	Album details	US	US Heat
2006	Morningwood: Released: January 10, 2006; Label: Capitol Records	102	1
2009	Diamonds & Studs: Released: October 27, 2009; Label: VH1 Records	—	—
"—" denotes releases that did not chart.

=== EPs ===
Year	Album details
2003	It's Tits: Released: 2003; Label: Rockhardcock
2005	Morningwood: Released: 2005; Label: Rockhardcock
2008	Sugarbaby: Released: 2008; Label: Capitol Records

==== It's Tits ====
It's Tits is the second EP from the ensemble.

===== Track listing =====
1. "Take Off Your Clothes"
2. "Jetsetter"
3. "Nu Rock"
4. "Red Light"

=== Singles ===
Single	Year	Peak chart positions		Album
Single	Year	US Alt	AUS	Album
"Nth Degree"	2005	30	92	Morningwood
"New York Girls"	2005	—	—	Morningwood
"Sugarbaby"	2008	—	—	Diamonds & Studs
"—" denotes releases that did not chart.
