= Lorenzo Borghese =

Italian-American television personality

- Born: June 9, 1972 (age 54); Milan, Italy
- Education: Rollins College (BA); Fordham Graduate School of Business (MBA)
- Occupations: Entrepreneur, television personality
- Known for: Founder of Prince Lorenzos Royal Treatment Line
- Spouse: Dasha Melgarejo (m. 2025)

Lorenzo Borghese (born June 9, 1972) is an Italian-American television personality and businessman.

== Early life and education ==
Lorenzo Borghese was born on June 9, 1972, in Milan, Italy, to Prince Francesco and Amanda Borghese. In 1979, his family moved to Short Hills, New Jersey. He graduated from high school at Pomfret School in Pomfret, Connecticut, in 1991.

In 1995, he graduated from Rollins College in Winter Park, Florida, where he was initiated into the Phi Delta Theta fraternity. In 2001, he earned an MBA from the Fordham Graduate School of Business.

== Business ==
In 2002, Borghese founded the Prince Lorenzo's Royal Treatment line, a skincare brand for pets sold in U.S. retail stores, through the television network HSN and directly to consumers online.

== Reality television ==
In the fall of 2006, Borghese starred in the ninth season of ABC's reality show The Bachelor.

In the summer of 2009, Borghese announced plans to appear on a web reality show titled America's Next Princess. The show coincided with the launch of Royal Pet Club, an online shopping website for his Royal Treatment pet products. When the show debuted on August 17, 2009, all contestants were revealed to be dogs. In August 2012, he appeared on the 10th season of Celebrity Big Brother UK and was evicted from the house on Day 22, finishing in 8th place.

== Personal life ==
On July 16, 2024, Borghese announced his engagement to his girlfriend, Dasha Melgarejo, on Instagram.

== Sources ==
- Libro d'oro della nobiltà italiana. Rome: Collegio Araldico. 2002. OCLC 469282197.

Preceded by Travis Lane Stork	The Bachelor; Season 9	Succeeded by Andrew Baldwin
