= Princess Goes =

American electronic rock band

- Princess Goes at Bowery Ballroom, NYC in 2022

Background information
- Origin: American (New York City)
- Genres: electronic rock, synth-pop, new wave, metalcore
- Years active: 2014-Present
- Labels: Morpho Music, SO Indegoot
- Members: Michael C. Hall (vocals), Matt Katz-Bohen (keys/synth/bass/guitar), Peter Yanowitz (vocals/drums/percussion/bass/guitar/synth)
- Website: princessgoes.com

Princess Goes is an American electronic rock band from New York City composed of Michael C. Hall (vocals), Matt Katz-Bohen (keys, synth, bass, guitar), Peter Yanowitz (vocals, drums, percussion, bass, guitar, synth), blending elements of synth-pop, new wave, and metalcore.

== History ==
The trio met in 2014 while performing in the Broadway musical, Hedwig and the Angry Inch, 2014–2015, with Michael C. Hall starring as Hedwig, Yanowitz as the "Angry Inch" drummer "Schlatko", and Katz-Bohen as a musician/performer and assistant music director. The group formed when Katz-Bohen and Yanowitz toured in the play's 2016–2017 national tour and started writing and producing tracks upon their return. Hall joined soon after to write lyrics and add vocals. Members have cited influences including The Pixies, Nirvana, and Boredoms. The band's original name, "Princess Goes to the Butterfly Museum", was the idea of Katz-Bohen's daughter.

Their first show was September 9, 2018, in Berlin. They have toured throughout the US, UK, and Europe, playing at notable venues including Bowery Ballroom, The Troubador, Great American Music Hall, Bush Hall, Riot Fest, and Beyond the Pale Festival.

== Releases ==
Princess Goes self-released their first album Thanks for Coming on their label, Morpho Music in 2021. The album was written during the COVID-19 pandemic and includes dystopian storytelling and dark ambient instrumentals.

Their 2022 song "Ketamine" was featured in the end credits of Dexter: New Blood. Their song "Eat an Eraser" was used as an end credit feature in Episode 5 of Dexter: Resurrection.

The album Come of Age (SO Indegoot Recordings) was released in October 2023. Louder Than War noted an "exceptional album" that recalls new wave bands such as the Human League, OMD, and ABC. Marcos Siega directed the music video for "Come of Age." The video is set in Times Square.

The band announced their third album, 3, in August 2026 with the release of a single and music video for the song, "French Kiss."

"3" was officially released on October 30th, 2026. It contains 11 songs.

== Discography ==
=== Albums ===
- Princess Goes to the Butterfly Museum EP, 2020 (Slow Down Sounds)
- Thanks for Coming LP, 2021 (Morpho Music)
- Ketamine (The Remix EP), 2022 (Morpho Music)
- Come of Age LP, 2023 (SO Indegoot)
- Come of Age deluxe LP, 2024 (w/ the Echo Mountain session) (SO Indegoot)
- 3 LP, 2026 (Morpho Music)

== List of Shows ==
Since their debut in 2018, Princess Goes has performed in various festivals, headline tours, and livestreamed sets across North America and Europe.

	Dates	City	Venue	Region	Ref.
2018	September 23	Manhattan	Berlin NYC	United States	
2018	December 6	New York City	Velvet Underground Experience	United States	
2019	February 26	Queens	Trans-Pecos	United States	
2019	April 14	Manhattan	Berlin NYC	United States	
2019	June 9	Manhattan	Berlin NYC	United States	
2019	July 7	Manhattan	Berlin NYC	United States	
2019	August 31	Manhattan	Le Poisson Rouge	United States	
2019	September 30	Brooklyn	Baby’s All Right	United States	
2019	November 17	Manhattan	The Mercury Lounge	United States	
2020	February 1	Manhattan	The Mercury Lounge	United States	
2020	March 12	Manhattan	The Mercury Lounge	United States	
2020	March 15	—	Instagram Live	—	
2021	January 27	Manhattan	The Cutting Room	United States	
2021	October 30	Manhattan	The Mercury Lounge	United States	
2021	October 31	Manhattan	The Mercury Lounge	United States	
2021	November 24	Brooklyn	The Sultan Room	United States	
2021	November 27	Bristol	Thekla	United Kingdom	
2021	November 28	Nottingham	Rescue Rooms	United Kingdom	
2021	November 29	Manchester	Night & Day Cafe	United Kingdom	
2021	November 30	London	Bush Hall	United Kingdom	
2021	December 2	Bedford	Bedford Esquires	United Kingdom	
2021	December 3	Birmingham	The Castle & Falcon	United Kingdom	
2021	December 4	Swansea	SinCity	United Kingdom	
2021	December 5	Glasgow	Mono Cafe Bar	United Kingdom	
2021	December 7	Belfast	Ulster Sports Club	United Kingdom	
2021	December 8	Dublin	The Workman’s Club	United Kingdom	
2021	December 9	Liverpool	24 Kitchen Street	United Kingdom	
2022	March 20	Pioneertown	Pappy & Harriets	United States	
2022	March 21	Costa Mesa	The Wayfarer	United States	
2022	March 22	Los Angeles	Zebulon	United States	
2022	March 23	Oakland	Starline Social Club	United States	
2022	March 25	Portland	Star Theater	United States	
2022	March 26	Spokane	The Big Dipper	United States	
2022	March 27	Seattle	Madame Lou’s	United States	
2022	March 29	Garden City	Visual Arts Collective	United States	
2022	March 30	Salt Lake City	Metro Music Hall	United States	
2022	March 31	Denver	The O	United States	
2022	April 16	Austin	Fusebox	United States	
2022	April 17	Houston	The Secret Group	United States	
2022	May 11	Manhattan	Le Poisson Rouge	United States	
2022	May 12	Manhattan	Le Poisson Rouge	United States	
2022	July 22	Baltimore	Soundstage	United States	
2022	July 23	Detroit	Smalls	United States	
2022	July 24	Chicago	The Metro	United States	
2022	July 25	Minneapolis	Varsity Theater	United States	
2022	July 27	Columbus	Skully’s Music Diner	United States	
2022	July 28	Nashville	Brooklyn Bowl	United States	
2022	July 29	Atlanta	The Masquerade	United States	
2022	July 30	Raleigh	Lincoln Theatre	United States	
2022	September 15	Manhattan	Bowery Ballroom	United States	
2023	September 20	Brooklyn	Elsewhere Rooftop	United States	
2023	September 26	Manchester	Club Academy	United Kingdom	
2023	September 27	Cardiff	The Globe	United Kingdom	
2023	September 28	Birmingham	O2 Institute 2	United Kingdom	
2023	September 29	Norwich	Waterfront	United Kingdom	
2023	October 1	Paris	Le Badaboum	France	
2023	October 2	Utrecht	TivoliVredenburg (Pandora)	Netherlands	
2023	October 4	Berlin	Frannz Club	Germany	
2023	October 5	Dortmund	Junkyard	Germany	
2023	October 6	Genk	Effort	Belgium	
2023	October 7	Utrecht	TivoliVredenburg (Pandora)	Netherlands	
2023	October 8	London	EartH	United Kingdom	
2023	December 9	Savannah	District Live	United States	
2023	December 10	Atlanta	Terminal West	United States	
2024	January 5	San Diego	Music Box	United States	
2024	January 6	West Hollywood	Troubadour	United States	
2024	January 7	San Francisco	Great American Music Hall	United States	
2024	January 19	Asheville	The Grey Eagle	United States	
2024	January 20	Nashville	Exit/In	United States	
2024	January 21	Louisville	Headliners Music Hall	United States	
2024	May 24	Raleigh	Kings	United States	
2024	May 25	Chattanooga	Barrelhouse Ballroom	United States	
2024	May 27	Charlotte	Visualite Theatre	United States	
2024	June 23	Wicklow	Glendalough Estate (Beyond The Pale Festival)	Ireland	
2024	June 25	Warsaw	Niebo	Poland	
2024	June 26	Prague	Futurum	Czech Republic	
2024	June 27	Vienna	Fluc	Austria	
2024	August 7	Brooklyn	Music Hall Of Williamsburg	United States	
2024	August 8	Cambridge	Sonia	United States	
2024	August 9	Philadelphia	Underground Arts	United States	
2024	August 10	Washington, D.C.	9:30 Club	United States	
2024	August 15	St. Louis	Off Broadway	United States	
2024	August 16	Indianapolis	HI-FI	United States	
2024	August 17	Chicago	Outset	United States	
2024	August 18	Ferndale	The Magic Bag	United States	
2024	September 21	Chicago	Douglass Park (Riot Fest)	United States	
