= Thomas Franklin =

Thomas or Tom Franklin may refer to:

- Thomas E. Franklin (born 1966), American photographer
- Thomas E. Franklin (lawyer) (1810–1884), Pennsylvania lawyer and attorney general
- Tom Franklin (poker player) (born 1950), American professional poker player
- Tom Franklin (author) (born 1962), American crime fiction writer
- Tom Franklin (rugby union) (born 1990), New Zealand rugby union player

== See also ==
- Thomas Francklin (1721–1784), English academic, clergyman, writer and dramatist
- Franklin Thomas (disambiguation)
