= You're Cut Off! =

- Cast of Season 1
- Genre: Reality
- Presented by: Laura Baron
- Narrated by: Rob Locke
- Opening theme: Sugarbaby
- Composer: Morningwood
- Country of origin: United States
- No. of seasons: 2
- No. of episodes: 16

Production
- Executive producers: Allison Grodner; Rich Meehan; Amy Palmer Robertson; Rick de Oliveira; Kari McFarland; Shelly Tatro; Jeff Olde
- Producers: Brandon Panaligan; Hubert Lin
- Cinematography: Troy Dunnagan
- Running time: 60 minutes (including commercials)
- Production company: Fly on the Wall Entertainment

Original release
- Network: VH1
- Release: June 9, 2010 – February 28, 2011

You're Cut Off! is a VH1 reality show that premiered on June 9, 2010. It features nine spoiled young women who thought they were going to be featured on a show called The Good Life. They are surprised instead to be informed that their families have cut them off from their money due to their spoiled ways, will be required to participate and pass an eight-week rehabilitation program in order to be taken back, and that the series will chronicle this process.

== Season 1 ==
=== Season 1 cast ===
Name	Location
Amber Smith	Savannah, Georgia
Courtnee Mason	Charlotte, North Carolina
Erica Rose	Houston, Texas
Gia Khay	Sherman Oaks, California
Jaqueline Madden	Mahwah, New Jersey
Jessica Cimato	Howell, New Jersey
Leanne Stern	Beverly Hills, California
Pamela Lynn Blazewski	Manhattan, New York

Former Castmate	Location
Chrissy O'Keith	Los Angeles, California

Hostess
Laura Baron – Professional Life Coach and Life Strategist

British Narrator
Rob Locke

=== Episode progress ===
Legend
Passed	Failed	V.I.P.	Graduated	No Evaluation	Out

Contestants	Week 1	Week 2	Week 3	Week 4	Week 5	Week 6	Week 7	Week 8
Amber	--	Pass	Pass	Pass	Pass	Pass	--	Grad
Courtnee	--	Pass	Pass	Pass	Pass	Pass	V.I.P.	Grad
Erica	--	Fail	Fail	V.I.P.	Pass	Fail	--	Grad
Gia	--	Fail	Pass	Fail	V.I.P.	Fail	--	Grad
Jaqueline	--	V.I.P.	Pass	Pass	Pass	Fail	--	Grad
Jessica	--	Pass	Fail	Pass	Pass	Fail	--	Grad
Leanne	--	Pass	V.I.P.	Pass	Pass	Pass	--	Grad
Pamela	--	Pass	Pass	Pass	Pass	Pass	--	Grad
Chrissy	--	Fail	Fail	Fail	Out	--		

=== Episodes ===
==== Episode 1: "Surprise...You're Cut Off!" ====
First aired June 9, 2010 (0.629M viewers)

The nine spoiled women are shocked to learn that their families have cut them off from their finances and enrolled them in an eight-week rehabilitation program designed to teach them self-reliance and humility. After being instructed to downsize all the belongings they brought with them into a single duffel bag, they are brought to live in a comparatively modest house with limited space, no servants, and limited allowances for groceries and certain comforts that will be predicated on their performance in the program. Professional life coach Laura Baron will be helping to guide them and will evaluate their progress, informing the women which of them have passed or failed each lesson. Gia fights Jacqueline at the end.

==== Episode 2: "Princess Cleaning Services" ====
First aired June 16, 2010

The girls are given the task of cleaning the house, but a few of them refuse, and show no deference to the maid who is provided to show them how to clean. Laura then informs them that the maid is the head of a cleaning service which the girls must now work for while cleaning the purported house of Omarosa Manigault-Stallworth. Laura later reveals the lesson was not about the cleaning but about respect. The concept of a VIP, or Very Improved Princess, award for the hardest-working girl is introduced; the VIP receives her own bedroom and private bathroom as well as control over who will do what chores and over the household budget.

Group	Task	Notes
Amber, Courtnee and Jaqueline	Master Bathroom	
Chrissy and Pamela	Kitchen	Chrissy refused to help Pamela with cleaning the kitchen
Jessica and Leanne	Living Room	
Erica and Gia	Foyer	Erica and Gia refused to do the lesson Omarosa argued with Gia for disrespecting her in her house

- Passed: Amber, Courtnee, Jessica, Leanne, Pamela, Jaqueline
- Failed: Erica, Gia & Chrissy.
- VIP: Jaqueline

==== Episode 3: "Dress for Less" ====
First aired June 23, 2010 (0.625M viewers)

The women are first given the task of completing their chores in order to earn their $200 allowance for food. Gia, Chrissy, and Jessica refuse to do them, thus reducing the spending money to $125. After grocery shopping, the girls meet with Sam Saboura, a top celebrity stylist to learn how to spend on a budget. The girls are first tested to see if they can tell the difference between expensive items and their cheap but identical-looking counterparts, with some surprising results. This is the prelude to their lesson, which is to create three looks made from clothes bought in a thrift store for only $300. Then they have a fashion show and show celebrity judges.

#	Group
1	Amber, Erica, and Pamela
2	Chrissy, Jaqueline, and Leanne
3	Courtnee, Gia, and Jessica

- Passed: Amber, Courtnee, Gia, Jacqueline, Leanne, Pamela
- Failed: Chrissy, Erica, Jessica
- VIP: Leanne

==== Episode 4: "She Works Hard for the Money" ====
First aired June 28, 2010 (0.728M viewers)

The women must write their resumes for a job interview, though Gia refuses both. The women are assigned to work at a Matisse Footwear warehouse, managing inventory, doing office work, etc. Chrissy, however, misses the shuttle to the task because she insists on doing her hair and makeup on her own timetable. Erica is made the manager at the job site, but Gia persistently excoriates her when Erica appears to supervise, including after Erica takes the boss' advice to try a positive reinforcement, and when the boss tries to intervene, Gia quits. The girls who earned their $70 for the day are treated to a spa afternoon, except Chrissy who did not earn a paycheck. Gia earned $50 for a partial day's work. When Erica is made VIP for her performance, an outraged Gia storms out of the house.

Group	Job	Notes
Erica	Manager	During the job/lesson, she was attacked by Gia and Jessica, but kept her cool
Jaqueline and Jessica	Sales	Jessica fought with Erica during the lesson
Courtnee, Leanne and Pamela	Office	Courtnee was alphabetizing invoices Pamela was folding and enveloping Leanne was sealing envelopes
Amber, Chrissy and Gia	Inventory	Chrissy didn't participate in the job/lesson because she refused to show up Gia quits her job during the lesson because of Erica being manager

- Passed: Amber, Courtnee, Erica, Leanne, Pamela, Jacqueline, Jessica
- Failed: Gia, Chrissy
- VIP: Erica

==== Episode 5: "Inner Beauty" ====
First aired July 5, 2010 (0.918M viewers)

The women are brought to a Buddhist temple, where they exposed to the monk's philosophies regarding inner beauty, though Chrissy and Jessica are resistant to participate. To further illustrate this lesson, Laura has the women do a photoshoot, and then another without elegant clothes or makeup. Gia has an emotionally revelatory moment with Laura. Chrissy is more resistant, and challenges Laura's authority, refusing to continue at one point. She later shows up to a meeting (45 minutes late) with Laura, and refuses to cooperate with her, forcing Laura to expel her from the program. Gia is made VIP.

- Passed: All (except Chrissy)
- Removed: Chrissy
- VIP: Gia

==== Episode 6: "Fun on a Budget" ====
First aired July 12, 2010 (0.646M viewers)

Gia uses her position as VIP for her benefit, assigning two chores to Pamela, (whom she has grown to dislike) and using the grocery money to buy herself a birthday cake while refusing to get any of the items requested by Erica, Pamela or Jaqueline. The women are then sent on a camping trip to learn how to enjoy themselves on a budget, but things don't quite turn out as expected. Gia, Jaqueline, Pamela, Erica, and Jessica get into a fight (not the least bit helped by Jessica's response to Erica's rendition of Kumbaya or Gia's deflated air mattress). At home, the fight that cut short their trip escalates. At the group session, Gia openly admits she exploited her privileges, and that she has no regard for the others' feelings. Laura fails Gia, Erica, Jessica and Jaqueline for their behavior and does not name a VIP because of their overall failure in the task, informing them all that their chances of graduation are in question.

- Passed: Courtnee, Amber, Leanne, Pamela
- Failed: Gia, Erica, Jessica, Jaqueline
- VIP: Not awarded

==== Episode 7: "Giving Back" ====
First aired July 19, 2010

The women go to PATH (People Assisting The Homeless), a charity championed by former Destiny's Child singer Michelle Williams that helps feed the homeless. The women are assigned to cook, feed and interact with PATH's beneficiaries, but Gia complained. However, she did participate in the challenge by cooking and serving food. She is later touched by one person's story, and offers him a job at her restaurant. Back at home, Laura informs them that they will have the rest of the belongings that they had to leave behind in the season premiere returned to them, but that they will sell them at a charity sale for PATH. She also stated that the team that sold the most items will win the challenge. The winners would be given a prize. The prize was a lunch date with Michelle Williams. Gia gave up her hookah. The team of Jessica, Gia, Leanne, and Amber win by having $36 more dollars. Gia later opens up to Courtnee about her life. Courtnee is named V.I.P.

- VIP: Courtnee

==== Episode 8: "Graduation Day" ====
First aired July 26, 2010 (1.451M viewers)

The women decorate the house and prepare a feast for their relatives, something they did not believe possible eight weeks before. Laura has one last challenge for them: to write a letter stating their case for graduation

- Graduated: Courtnee, Jessica, Leanne, Amber, Pamela, Erica, Jacqueline, Gia

== Season 2 ==
In July 2010, it was announced that casting had begun for a second season. Season 2 premiered on Monday, January 10, 2011 at 9 pm on VH1.

Contestant Jennifer Jowett proved particularly troublesome, being involved in "physical altercations" with other cast members and being arrested for DUI.

=== Season 2 Cast ===
Name	Age	Location
Aimee Johnson	27	Houston, Texas
Hana Hills	28	Hollywood, California
Jessica Koussevitzky	23	Lauderdale-By-the-Sea, Florida
Lauren Grissom	25	Nashville, Tennessee
Marcy Guevara	26	Buena Park, California
Marissa Erskine	26	Upper Freehold, New Jersey
Nadia Atiqi	21	Katy, Texas

Former Castmate	Age	Location
Jennifer Jowett	28	West Hollywood, California
Shakyra LaShae	25	Brooklyn, New York

Hostess
Laura Baron – Professional Life Coach and Life Strategist

British Narrator
Rob Locke

=== Episode progress ===
Legend
Passed	Failed	V.I.P.	Graduated	No Evaluation	Out

Contestants	Week 1	Week 2	Week 3	Week 4	Week 5	Week 6	Week 7	Week 8
Aimee	--	Fail	V.I.P.	Fail	Pass	Fail	--	Grad
Hana	--	Fail	Fail	Fail	V.I.P.	Pass	--	Grad
Jessica	--	Pass	Pass	Fail	Pass	Fail	--	Grad
Lauren	--	Pass	Pass	Fail	Pass	Pass	V.I.P.	Grad
Marcy	--	V.I.P.	Pass	Fail	Pass	Fail	--	Grad
Marissa	--	Pass	Pass	Fail	Fail	Fail	--	Grad
Nadia	--	Fail	Fail	Fail	Pass	V.I.P.	--	Grad
Jennifer	--	Fail	Fail	Out	--			
Shakyra	Out	--						

=== Episodes ===
==== Episode 1: "You're So Not It, Girl" ====
First aired January 10, 2011 (0.869M viewers)

Professional life coach Laura Baron is back, overseeing a princess rehabilitation program for the out-of-control elite. Eight more spoiled princesses are plucked from their exclusive and extravagant lifestyles after their benefactors, fed up after years of bankrolling their expensive habits, cut the girls off from their finances. The girls learn their fate the hard way, thinking that they were auditioning for a reality show looking for The Next "It" Girl (of which Laura was disguised as one). Instead, these eight women must live together in a middle class two-bedroom house while they learn to cook, clean and live without the benefit of a cadre of personal assistants, chefs and hair stylists. As the girls set out on their difficult personal journey toward financial and personal independence, it may be too much for some in the group to handle.

- Left on own accord: Shakyra

==== Episode 2: "Live Fab...Now Pay The Tab" ====
First aired January 17, 2011 (0.559M viewers)

After one spoiled princess reaches her breaking point and walks out of the program, a new girl arrives: the self-proclaimed Queen of Jersey Bling. Laura tests their willingness to take responsibility for their spending habits on a disastrous trip to a country club. The princesses run up several thousand dollars on massages, mimosas and manicures in less than 45 minutes and must work off their debt at the club. Cleaning the tennis courts and shagging golf balls from the lake leads to some fierce confrontations as these ladies learn what it means to pay their own tab.

- Passed: Marcy, Lauren, Marissa, Jessica
- Failed: Hana, Nadia, Aimee, Jennifer
- VIP: Marcy

==== Episode 3: "Do You Want Fries With That?" ====
First aired January 24, 2011 (0.543M viewers)

Laura tries to teach the princesses to appreciate earning a paycheck as they enter the work force, flipping burgers and manning the fry vats and drive-thru window at a local fast food joint. Tempers flare as they struggle to work with one another...leading up to an explosive confrontation during group session as one girl refuses to accept Laura's guidance. Will the stress of being cut off cause another spoiled princess to quit the program?

Group	Job	Notes
Marissa and Hana	Counter and drive-thru	Hana was promoted to shift manager and Jenn took Hana's place.
Marcy and Jenn	Grill and fryers	After Hana's promotion, Jenn worked drive-thru.
Jessica and Nadia	Clean-up and prep	After Hana's promotion, they take over Aimee/Lauren's position. Nadia quits after confrontation with Hana.
Aimee and Lauren	Marketing	Wearing hot dog or fries costume to notify drive-by motorists After Hana's promotion, they take over Jessica/Nadia's position.

- Passed: Marcy, Lauren, Marissa, Jessica, Aimee
- Failed: Nadia, Hana, Jennifer
- VIP: Aimee

==== Episode 4: "Frugal Fashion?" ====
First aired January 31, 2011 (0.673M viewers)

Shortly After Jenn's removal from the show, Laura Explains to the girls about Jenn's departure . Money is usually no object when it comes to these princesses' wardrobes. But now they'll need to check price tags as they compete against each other to create a red carpet look for New York socialite Tinsley Mortimer. The girls will be purchasing clothes from a swap meet on a razor-thin budget. Celebrity stylist Robert Verdi judges these thrifty threads. But the girls can't help buying a few things for themselves on the side. Stress over budgets invades the homestead, as they wage war on one another over the weekly grocery list and food budget. At group session Laura explains about the Incident that happen earlier at the red carpet . Laura fails everyone & graduation Is still on the question.

	Group
Blue	Lauren, Jessica, Hana and Aimee
Orange	Marcy, Nadia and Marissa

- Failed: All
- Removed: Jennifer

==== Episode 5: "The Allure of Manure" ====
First aired February 7, 2011 (0.883M viewers)

The girls usually live to excess, but they encounter a lifestyle that's exactly the opposite when Laura brings them to an urban homestead: an eco-friendly self-sufficient house. They roll up their Gucci sleeves to help collect chicken eggs, wrangle goats and pile up compost on this organic micro-farm.

- Passed: Marcy, Lauren, Nadia, Jessica, Aimee, Hana
- Failed: Marissa
- VIP: Hana

==== Episode 6: "Volunteer Vixens" ====
First aired February 14, 2011 (0.478M viewers)

Despite being more accustomed to painting nails rather than hammering them, the girls help build a house for Habitat for Humanity as Laura teaches these spoiled divas about charity. Laura also tasks them to raise money by selling their brand-name clothing at a pawn shop, testing whether they will part with their ritzy labels for less-than-top dollar prices. Even though Jessica raised more money than anyone else, and what the family needed was money, the others still frowned upon her greedy ways. The lack of charity by some, particularly in the case of a dress purchased at the Frugal Fashion challenge, causes a colossal rift in the house and a major blow up between two pampered princesses.

- Passed: Lauren, Nadia, Hana
- Failed: Aimee, Marissa, Marcy, Jessica
- VIP: Nadia

==== Episode 7: "Alone On The Range" ====
First aired February 21, 2011

High heels are traded in for cowboy boots, as Laura sends the ladies off to a dude ranch to learn they can have fun on a budget. But fun is debatable for these divas as they tackle freezing desert nights, howling coyotes, a "mechanical" bull, and a runaway horse that ends up injuring one girl. Without a five-star hotel, the great outdoors push the girls to their limits.

- VIP: Lauren

==== Episode 8: "Graduation Day" ====
First aired February 28, 2011 (0.761M viewers)

It's graduation week at Princess Rehab! The ladies prepare the house for the arrival of their benefactors, hoping to prove to all that they have changed their spoiled ways. Their families will ultimately decide if they've passed the program or if they'll remain cut off for good.

- Graduated: Aimee, Hana, Jessica, Lauren, Marcy, Marissa, Nadia
