= Diamonds & Studs =

Studio album by Morningwood
- Released: October 27, 2009
- Genres: Alternative rock, dance-rock, power pop
- Length: 38:56
- Label: VH1
- Producer: Junior Sanchez

Morningwood chronology
Sugarbaby (2008)	Diamonds & Studs (2009)

Professional ratings
Review scores
Source	Rating
AllMusic	3/5 stars

Diamonds & Studs is the second and final studio album by American alternative rock band Morningwood. It was released on October 27, 2009.

"Best of Me" was used as the theme song to Daisy of Love.

== Critical reception ==
AllMusic wrote that "while Diamonds & Studs may be a forgettable pop record, it's certainly one that's easy on the ears and hard on dancefloors." Spin wrote that "though these high-energy, guitar-heavy tracks sound like desperate jumps onto bandwagons that left the station long ago ('Killer Life' resembles a No Doubt/Kelly Clarkson collaboration), they’re at least sporadically sticky."

== Track listing ==
No.	Title	Writer(s)	Length
1.	"Best of Me"	Euringer, Mann, Yanowitz	3:01
2.	"Killer Life"	Euringer, Yanowitz	2:33
3.	"Hot Tonight"	Euringer, Ottestad, Yanowitz	2:41
4.	"How You Know It's Love"	Euringer, Mann, Yanowitz	3:34
5.	"Snobby Little Elf"	Euringer, Yanowitz	3:16
6.	"Sugarbaby"	Euringer, Hollander, Katz, Yanowitz	3:02
7.	"Bitches"	Euringer, Ottestad, Yanowitz	2:38
8.	"Addicted"	Euringer, Ottestad, Yanowitz	3:23
9.	"Bipolar Bear"	Euringer, Ottestad, Yanowitz	3:10
10.	"Teenage"	Euringer, Ottestad, Yanowitz	2:17
11.	"That's My Tune"	Euringer, Ottestad, Yanowitz	2:54
12.	"Three's a Crowd"	Euringer, Lucas, Yanowitz	3:03
13.	"Cat in a Box"	Euringer, Mann, Yanowitz	3:24
Total length:			38:56

== Personnel ==
- Chantal Claret – vocals
