= Blondie discography =

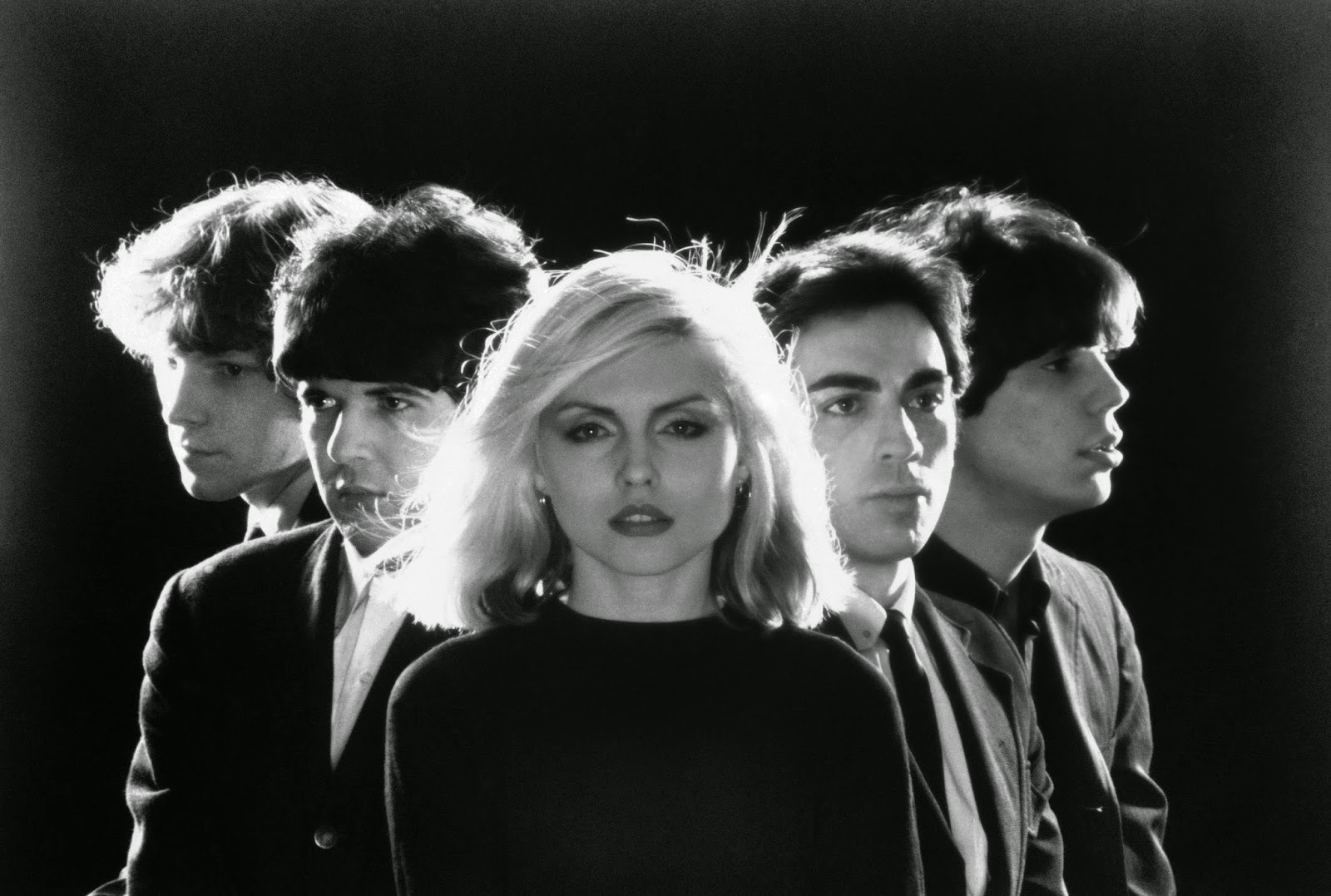
- Blondie in 1977
- Studio albums: 11
- Extended plays: 3
- Live albums: 4
- Compilation albums: 14
- Singles: 39
- Video albums: 7
- Music videos: 35

Since 1976, the American new wave band Blondie has released 11 studio albums, 4 live albums, 14 compilation albums, 3 remix albums, 3 EPs, and 39 singles. The band has sold an estimated 40 million albums, and has achieved 4 number-one hits on the Billboard Hot 100.

== Albums ==
=== Studio albums ===
Title	Album details	Peak chart positions										Certifications
Title	Album details	US	AUS (Note: Peak chart positions for Australia: Kent Music Report peaks: Top 100 peaks to 19 June 1988: Kent, David (1993). Australian Chart Book 1970–1992 (Illustrated ed.). St. Ives, N.S.W.: Australian Chart Book. pp. 37–38. ISBN 0-646-11917-6. N.B. the Kent Report chart was licensed by ARIA between mid 1983 and 19 June 1988.; ARIA Chart peaks: Top 50 peaks from 26 June 1988: "australian-charts.com > Blondie in Australian Charts". australian-charts.com.; Top 100 peaks from January 1990 to December 2010: Ryan, Gavin (2011). Australia's Music Charts 1988-2010. Mt. Martha, VIC, Australia: Moonlight Publishing.; "Denis (remix)": "Response from ARIA re: chart inquiry, received 24 May 2016". Imgur.com.; "Atomic (remix)": "The ARIA Australian Top 100 Singles Chart – Week Ending 11 Dec 1994". ARIA.; "Maria": "ariaNET The Chart! Top 100 Singles – Week Commencing 29th March 1999". ARIA.; Blondie 4(0) Ever: "The ARIA Report: Week Commencing 2 June 2014" (PDF). The ARIA Report (1266). Australian Web Archive. June 20, 2014. Archived from the original (PDF) on 2014-06-20.; Greatest Hits: "ARIA Chart Watch #415". auspOp. 2017-04-08. Archived from the original on 2017-04-09.)	AUT	CAN	GER	NLD	NZ	NOR	SWE	UK	Certifications
Blondie	Released: December 1976; Labels: Private Stock, Chrysalis Records; Formats: 8-track, cassette, CD, LP	—	14	—	—	—	—	—	—	—	75*	UK: Gold
Plastic Letters	Released: September 1977; Label: Chrysalis; Formats: 8-track, cassette, CD, LP	72	64	—	—	—	2	38	—	33	10	NLD: Gold; UK: Platinum
Parallel Lines	Released: September 1978; Label: Chrysalis; Formats: 8-track, cassette, CD, LP	6	2	24	2	9	7	3	16	9	1	US: Platinum; CAN: 4× Platinum; NLD: Gold; UK: Platinum
Eat to the Beat	Released: September 1979; Label: Chrysalis; Formats: 8-track, cassette, CD, LP	17	9	19	6	23	16	3	6	2	1	US: Platinum; AUS: Platinum; CAN: 2× Platinum; UK: Platinum
Autoamerican	Released: November 1980; Label: Chrysalis; Formats: 8-track, cassette, CD, LP	7	8	18	4	42	16	6	12	11	3	US: Platinum; CAN: 3× Platinum; UK: Platinum
The Hunter	Released: May 1982; Label: Chrysalis; Formats: 8-track, cassette, CD, LP	33	15	—	24	49	19	27	19	18	9	AUS: Gold
No Exit	Released: February 1999; Label: Beyond; Formats: Cassette, CD	18	72	20	34	18	80	—	—	36	3	UK: Gold
The Curse of Blondie	Released: October 2003; Labels: Sanctuary (US), Epic (UK); Formats: Cassette, CD	160	83	—	—	84	—	—	—	—	36	
Panic of Girls	Released: July 2011; Label: Five Seven; Formats: CD, LP, digital download	—	—	—	—	—	62	—	—	—	73	
Blondie 4(0) Ever (Includes Greatest Hits Redux and Ghosts of Download)	Released: May 2014; Labels: Five Seven, Noble ID, Caroline; Formats: CD, LP, digital download	109	72	—	—	44	—	—	—	—	16	UK: Gold
Pollinator	Released: May 2017; Label: BMG; Formats: Cassette, CD, digital download, LP	63	29	27	—	21	78	—	—	—	4	
High Noon	Release: February 26, 2027; Label: BMG; Formats: Cassette, CD, digital download, LP	To be released										
"—" denotes items which were not released in that country or failed to chart.

* The band's debut album, Blondie, did not chart in the UK following its original release, but charted in March 1979 after it was re-released by Chrysalis Records.

=== Live albums ===
Title	Album details
Picture This Live	Released: October 7, 1997; Labels: EMI/Capitol; Format: CD
Live (US) / Livid (UK)	Released: November 23, 1999; Label: Beyond Music; Format: CD
Live by Request	Released: September 14, 2004; Label: Sanctuary; Formats: CD, CD+DVD
At the BBC	Released: October 4, 2010; Label: Chrysalis; Format: CD+DVD

=== Compilation albums ===
Title	Album details	Peak chart positions								Certifications
Title	Album details	US	AUS	CAN	NLD	NZ	NOR	SWE	UK	Certifications
The Best of Blondie	Released: October 16, 1981; Label: Chrysalis; Formats: Cassette, CD, LP	30	1	15	46	1	—	—	4	US: 2× Platinum; UK: 2× Platinum
The Complete Picture: The Very Best of Deborah Harry and Blondie (Blondie and Debbie Harry)	Released: March 4, 1991; Label: Chrysalis; Formats: Cassette, CD, LP	—	6	—	42	1	—	—	3	UK: Gold
Blonde and Beyond	Released: November 16, 1993; Labels: Chrysalis/EMI; Formats: Cassette, CD	—	—	—	—	—	—	—	—	
The Platinum Collection	Released: November 1, 1994; Labels: Chrysalis/EMI; Formats: Cassette, CD	—	—	—	—	—	—	—	—	UK: Gold
Denis	Released: November 11, 1996; Labels: Disky Communications/EMI; Formats: Cassette, CD	—	—	—	—	—	—	—	—	UK: Silver
Picture This – The Essential Blondie Collection	Released: April 6, 1998; Label: EMI; Formats: Cassette, CD	—	—	—	—	—	—	—	—	UK: Gold
Atomic: The Very Best of Blondie	Released: July 13, 1998; Labels: Chrysalis/EMI; Formats: Cassette, CD	—	—	—	48	18	—	—	12	NZ: Gold; UK: Platinum
Greatest Hits	Released: September 19, 2002; Labels: EMI/Capitol; Formats: Cassette, CD	—	73	—	—	15	—	30	38	UK: 2× Platinum
Greatest Hits: Sight + Sound	Released: November 8, 2005; Labels: EMI/Capitol; Format: CD+DVD	—	—	—	—	—	23	—	48	US: Gold; UK: Platinum
Singles Collection: 1977–1982	Released: October 16, 2009; Labels: Chrysalis/EMI; Format: CD	—	—	—	—	—	—	—	—	UK: Gold
Essential	Released: October 31, 2011; Labels: Chrysalis/EMI Gold; Format: CD	—	—	—	—	—	—	—	—	UK: Platinum
"—" denotes items which were not released in that country or failed to chart.

=== Remix albums ===
Title	Album details	Peak chart positions	
Title	Album details	AUS	UK
Once More into the Bleach (Blondie and Debbie Harry)	Released: 1988; Label: Chrysalis; Formats: Cassette, CD, LP	47	50
Beautiful: The Remix Album	Released: June 18, 1995; Labels: Chrysalis/EMI; Formats: Cassette, CD	—	25
Remixed Remade Remodeled: The Remix Project	Released: July 18, 1995; Labels: Chrysalis/EMI; Formats: Cassette, CD	—	—
"—" denotes items which were not released in that country or failed to chart.

== Box sets ==
Title	Album details	Peak chart positions	Notes
Title	Album details	UK	Notes
Singles Box	Released: June 14, 2004; Label: EMI; Format: 15 CDs	—	The box set includes 15 CD singles, and albums from Blondie to The Hunter are represented.
Original Era	Released: 2016; Label: Universal; Format: 6 LPs	—	The box set includes first six studio albums from Blondie to The Hunter with reproductions of the original album artworks, and is packed in a Parallel Lines-themed slipcase box.
Against the Odds: 1974–1982	Released: August 26, 2022; Label: Capitol, Universal; Format: 10×LP, 4×LP, 8×CD, 3×CD	25	Includes the band's first six studio albums from Blondie to The Hunter (10 LP/8 CD) and several LPs/discs of B-sides, outtakes and demos.; Nominated for the Grammy Award for Best Historical Album

== Extended plays ==
List of extended plays, with selected chart positions
Title	Details
iTunes Festival: London 2014	Released: December 9, 2014; Label: Noble ID; Formats: digital download
Vivir en la Habana	Released: July 16, 2021; Label: BMG; Formats: vinyl, digital download
Yuletide Throwdown	Released: October 8, 2021; Label: Capitol Records; Formats: vinyl, digital download

== Singles ==
Year	Single	Peak chart positions										Certifications	Album
Year	Single	US	AUS	BEL	CAN	GER	IRL	NLD	NZ	SWE	UK	Certifications	Album
1976	"X Offender"	—	—	—	—	—	—	—	—	—	—		Blondie
1976	"In the Flesh"	—	2	40	—	—	—	—	—	—	—		Blondie
1977	"Rip Her to Shreds"	—	81	—	—	—	—	—	—	—	—		Blondie
1977	"Kidnapper" (Note: "Kidnapper" is a Japanese-only release)	—	—	—	—	—	—	—	—	—	—		Plastic Letters
1978	"Denis"	—	12	1	—	9	3	1	—	19	2	NLD: Gold; UK: Gold	Plastic Letters
1978	"(I'm Always Touched by Your) Presence, Dear"	—	—	14	—	—	—	8	—	—	10		Plastic Letters
1978	"Picture This"	—	88	—	—	—	13	—	—	15	12	UK: Silver	Parallel Lines
1978	"I'm Gonna Love You Too"	—	—	3	—	—	—	6	—	—	—		Parallel Lines
1978	"Hanging on the Telephone"	—	39	19	—	—	16	20	43	—	5	UK: Silver	Parallel Lines
1979	"Heart of Glass" (Note: "Heart of Glass" reached #1 on the RPM Adult Contemporary chart)	1	1	5	1	1	2	8	1	3	1	US: Gold; AUS: 2× Platinum; CAN: 2× Platinum; GER: Gold; UK: 2× Platinum; NZ: 2× Platinum	Parallel Lines
1979	"Sunday Girl"	—	5	—	—	6	1	48	5	5	1	UK: Gold	Parallel Lines
1979	"One Way or Another" (Note: "One Way or Another" reached #7 on the RPM Adult Contemporary chart) (Note: "One Way or Another" was not released as a single in the UK, but charted from downloads in 2013 after a cover/mash-up of the song was released by One Direction and reached number one.)	24	—	—	7	—	—	—	—	—	98	UK: Platinum; NZ: 2× Platinum	Parallel Lines
1979	"Dreaming"	27	53	16	4	26	3	12	9	19	2	UK: Silver	Eat to the Beat
1979	"Union City Blue"	—	—	—	—	54	17	—	47	—	13	UK: Silver	Eat to the Beat
1980	"The Hardest Part"	84	—	—	86	—	—	—	—	—	—		Eat to the Beat
1980	"Call Me"	1	4	9	1	14	2	12	6	3	1	US: Gold; CAN: Platinum; UK: Platinum; NZ: 2× Platinum	American Gigolo (soundtrack)
1980	"Atomic"	39	12	8	57	20	3	17	7	—	1	UK: Platinum	Eat to the Beat
1980	"Heroes" (Note: "Heroes" (also released as a B-side to the "Atomic" single) is a German 12-inch maxi-only release)	—	—	—	—	—	—	—	—	—	—		Non-album single
1980	"The Tide Is High" (Note: "The Tide Is High" charted on the Billboard Adult Contemporary chart, reaching #3)	1	4	4	1	15	2	5	1	19	1	US: Gold; CAN: Platinum; UK: Gold; NZ: Platinum	Autoamerican
1981	"Rapture" (Note: "Rapture" charted on both the R&B Songs and Mainstream Rock charts, reaching #33 and #35 respectively)	1	5	8	3	40	4	20	4	13	5	US: Gold; UK: Silver	Autoamerican
1981	"Yuletide Throwdown" (co-starring Freddie) (Note: Though not released as a regular single, "Yuletide Throwdown" was originally recorded in 1981 (originally known as "Christmas Rap") by Debbie Harry and rap artist Fab Five Freddy. A white label test pressing was made by Chris Stein's "Animal Records" label in 1981, and the track was released in 1982 as a free flexidisc with Flexipop magazine in the UK. The blue, green or red 7-inch single played at 33 rpm, and included two other festive-themed tracks by The Brattles and Snuky Tate, both of which were also produced by Stein. In 2021, Blondie's song was released digitally and as a limited-edition 12-inch vinyl single by Blondie themselves.)	—	—	—	—	—	—	—	—	—	—		Non-album single
1982	"Island of Lost Souls" (Note: "Island of Lost Souls" reached #1 on the RPM Adult Contemporary chart)	37	13	8	—	66	15	21	18	—	11		The Hunter
1982	"War Child"	—	96	—	—	—	21	—	—	—	39		The Hunter
1982	"Danceway"	—	—	—	—	—	—	—	—	—	—		The Hunter
1988	"Denis" (remix)	—	139	—	—	—	—	—	30	—	50		Once More into the Bleach
1988	"Heart of Glass" (remix) (Note: "Heart of Glass '88" is an Australian- and French-only release)	—	—	—	—	—	—	—	—	—	—		Once More into the Bleach
1989	"Call Me" (remix)	—	—	—	—	—	—	—	—	—	61		Once More into the Bleach
1994	"Atomic" (remix)	—	98	—	—	—	—	—	—	—	19		Beautiful: The Remix Album
1994	"Rapture" (remix) (Note: The 1994 remix of "Rapture" charted on the Hot Dance Singles chart, reaching #35)	—	—	—	—	—	—	—	—	—	—		Beautiful: The Remix Album
1995	"Heart of Glass" (remix) (Note: The 1995 remix of "Heart of Glass" charted on the Hot Dance Singles chart, peaking at #11)	—	—	—	—	—	—	—	—	—	15		Beautiful: The Remix Album
1995	"Union City Blue" (remix) (Note: The 1995 remix of "Union City Blue" charted on the Hot Dance Singles chart, peaking at #30)	—	—	—	—	—	—	—	—	—	31		Beautiful: The Remix Album
1999	"Maria" (Note: "Maria" peaked at #14 on the Billboard Adult Top 40 chart, at #3 on the Hot Dance Singles chart, and at #28 on the RPM Adult Contemporary chart)	82	59	3	46	3	3	19	16	7	1	GER: Platinum; UK: Platinum	No Exit
1999	"Nothing Is Real but the Girl"	—	—	—	—	89	—	—	—	—	26		No Exit
1999	"No Exit" (featuring Coolio)	—	—	—	—	—	—	—	—	—	—		No Exit
2003	"Good Boys"	—	37	—	—	93	—	—	—	—	12		The Curse of Blondie
2005	"Rapture Riders" (Blondie vs. The Doors)	—	23	21	—	—	—	39	—	—	—		Greatest Hits: Sight + Sound
2011	"Mother"	—	—	—	—	—	—	—	—	—	—		Panic of Girls
2011	"What I Heard"	—	—	—	—	—	—	—	—	—	—		Panic of Girls
2013	"A Rose by Any Name" (featuring Beth Ditto)	—	—	—	—	—	—	—	—	—	—		Ghosts of Download
2013	"Sugar on the Side" (featuring Systema Solar)	—	—	—	—	—	—	—	—	—	—		Ghosts of Download
2014	"I Want to Drag You Around"	—	—	—	—	—	—	—	—	—	—		Ghosts of Download
2017	"Fun"	—	—	—	—	—	—	—	—	—	—		Pollinator
2017	"Long Time" (Note: "Long Time" also reached #19 on the US Adult Alternative Songs chart.)	—	—	—	—	—	—	—	—	—	—		Pollinator
2017	"Too Much"	—	—	—	—	—	—	—	—	—	—		Pollinator
2017	"Doom or Destiny" (featuring Joan Jett)	—	—	—	—	—	—	—	—	—	—		Pollinator
2026	"Spectral Eyes"	—	—	—	—	—	—	—	—	—	—		High Noon
"—" denotes items which were not released in that country or failed to chart.

=== Digital downloads ===
Year	Single	Album
2009	"We Three Kings" (Note: Christmas single made available for free download on Blondie's official website.)	Non-album singles
2012 (Note: In 2012, the band released several tracks for free download via Amazon and on the band's website. "Bride of Infinity", "Dead Air" and "Rock On" were put online on October 10, in order to coincide with the band's performance on YouTube Presents, while "Practice Makes Perfect" was released in November.)	"Restless" (Note: An outtake from the Panic of Girls sessions of 2011, posted on Deborah Harry's website as a free download including cover art and credits.)	Non-album singles
2012	"Bride of Infinity"	Non-album singles
2012	"Dead Air"	Non-album singles
2012	"Rock On"	Non-album singles
2012	"Practice Makes Perfect"	Non-album singles

=== Promotional singles ===
Year	Single	Album
1982	"Danceway" (Canada only)	The Hunter
1999	"Screaming Skin"	No Exit
2004	"Undone"	The Curse of Blondie
2017	"My Monster"	Pollinator
2017	"Fragments"	Pollinator
2017	"Tonight"	Pollinator

== Other appearances ==
List of non-single songs by Blondie from non-Blondie releases, showing year released and album name
Title	Year	Album
"Ring of Fire"	1980	Roadie: Original Motion Picture Sound Track
"Ordinary Bummer" (Note: Released under the name "Adolph's Dog".)	1997	We Will Fall: The Iggy Pop Tribute
"More than This" (Note: Recorded and released to promote The New Cars and Blondie's Road Rage Tour.)	2006	The New Cars and Blondie: Road Rage

== Video ==
=== Video albums ===
Title	Album details	Certifications
Eat to the Beat	Released: 1980; Label: Warner Home Video; Format: VHS, LD, CED	
The Best of Blondie	Released: 1981; Label: PolyGram Video; Format: VHS, LD	
The Complete Picture: The Very Best of Deborah Harry and Blondie	Released: 1991; Label: Chrysalis; Format: VHS, LD	
No Exit	Released: 1999 (2008); Label: Epistrophy Pictures; Format: DVD/Amazon Prime Video	
Live	Released: 1999 (2005); Labels: Beyond Music, EV Classics; Format: DVD	UK: Platinum
Greatest Video Hits	Released: 2002; Labels: Chrysalis/EMI; Format: DVD	UK: Gold
Live by Request	Released: 2004; Label: Warner Music Vision; Format: DVD	
Live at CBGB's 1977 (Note: released as a bonus DVD in the deluxe edition of Blondie 4(0) Ever, which includes Greatest Hits Deluxe Redux and Ghosts of Download, the band's 10th studio album.)	Released: May 12, 2014; Labels: Five Seven Music, Noble ID, Caroline Records; Format: DVD	

=== Music videos ===
Year	Title	Director(s)
1977	"In the Flesh"	Richard Robinson & Bob Gruen
1977	"In the Sun"	Richard Robinson & Bob Gruen
1977	"X Offender"	Richard Robinson & Bob Gruen
1977	"Denis"	Keef
1977	"Detroit 442"	Keef
1978	"(I'm Always Touched By Your) Presence, Dear"	Keef
1978	"Picture This"	Keef
1978	"Hanging on the Telephone"	David Mallet
1979	"Heart of Glass"	Stanley Dorfman
1979	"Dreaming"	David Mallet
1979	"The Hardest Part"	David Mallet
1979	"Union City Blue"	David Mallet
1979	"Shayla"	David Mallet
1979	"Eat to the Beat"	David Mallet
1979	"Accidents Never Happen"	David Mallet
1979	"Die Young Stay Pretty"	David Mallet
1979	"Slow Motion"	David Mallet
1979	"Atomic"	David Mallet
1979	"Sound-A-Sleep"	David Mallet
1979	"Victor"	David Mallet
1979	"Living in the Real World"	David Mallet
1980	"Call Me"	David Mallet
1980	"The Tide Is High"	Hart Perry
1980	"Rapture"	Keith McMillan & John Weaver
1982	"Island of Lost Souls"	Keith McMillan
1999	"Maria"	Alan Smithee
1999	"Nothing Is Real But the Girl"	James Frost & Alex Smith
1999	"No Exit"	Frank Sacramento
2003	"Good Boys"	Jonas Åkerlund
2005	"Rapture Riders"	Addictive TV
2009	"We Three Kings"	Michael Gaylin
2011	"Mother"	Laurent Rejto
2014	"Sugar on the Side"	Rankin
2017	"Fun"	Dikayl Rimmasch
2017	"Long Time"	Dikayl Rimmasch
2017	"Doom or Destiny"	Rob Roth
