= Blondie 4(0) Ever =

2014 album by Blondie

- Greatest Hits Deluxe Redux cover

Greatest hits album / Studio album by Blondie
- Released: May 12, 2014
- Recorded: 2012–2013
- Studios: Mercy Sound (New York City); Skyline (Oakland, California)
- Length: 95:13
- Label: Noble ID
- Producers: Matt Katz-Bohen; Kato Khandwala; Craig Leon; Jeff Saltzman; Chris Stein

Blondie chronology
Panic of Girls (2011)	Blondie 4(0) Ever (2014)	Pollinator (2017)

Ghosts of Download cover

Singles from Ghosts of Download
- 1. "A Rose by Any Name" Released: June 21, 2013; 2. "Sugar on the Side" Released: December 17, 2013; 3. "I Want to Drag You Around" Released: April 3, 2014

Blondie 4(0) Ever is a double album by American rock band Blondie. It was released on May 12, 2014, by Noble ID in celebration of the band's 40th anniversary. The two-disc package consists of Greatest Hits Deluxe Redux, a collection of re-recordings of Blondie's past singles, and the band's tenth studio album, Ghosts of Download. The latter spawned three singles: "A Rose by Any Name", "Sugar on the Side", and "I Want to Drag You Around".

== Background and recording ==
Blondie began working on their tenth studio album shortly after the release of Panic of Girls (2011). In early March 2013, the band announced via Facebook and Twitter that they were putting finishing touches to new music, and it would be released later that year. The album was recorded at Mercy Sound Studios in New York City and at Skyline Studios in Oakland, California. Guitarist and co-founder Chris Stein announced that the album would feature collaborations with girl group Stush, hip hop group Los Rakas, and Colombian electronica artist Systema Solar. On June 18, the group announced through Facebook that they were still recording but almost finished, while revealing that their next album would be titled Ghosts of Download. Stein stated in August that an EDM collaboration with Hector Fonseca would be included on the album.

"We have live performances on there that bring out the style of Blondie", Debbie Harry told Classic Rock. "I don't think it sounds entirely like a dance record... We did this in a very economical way, actually. Chris [Stein] and Matt did all of their work on computer, then we would send files to people and they would play to it, or sing to it, or write to it, or whatever. So it was kind of in the ghostly era of electronics."

"This project was ongoing since we finished Panic of Girls", Stein commented. "It's been like two years that I have been working on this. This one is more computer-based than the last record, which was more band-based. A lot of the programmed parts remained on the record, more so than the previous records. I spent a lot of time doing this at home, and then sending things back and forth with our producer Jeff Saltzman. He helped develop melodies with me, and that was really gratifying. And he had this assistant, Natalie Hawkins, who helped with the melodies too. There was a lot of collaboration with this record, more so than previous records, except perhaps for Autoamerican which had a lot of outside players on it, even an orchestra."

Harry also commented, "It's always the music; the music is the primary inspiration. Every piece has its own mood, its own arc and a lot of times the lyrics sort of suggest themselves."

"Oh, with Debbie, we just have a lot of unsaid communication, a lot of non-verbal stuff goes on. I don't have to ask her much because she will always have the same conclusions", Stein said. Harry agreed: "Most recently, there were a couple of lines in a song that he came up with, and then there were two more lines that had to be written, and I had already written them. So I mean, it just sort of happens. It's easy for us."

== Release ==
The title of Blondie's tenth studio album was confirmed to be Ghosts of Download on June 18, 2013. According to Stein, the title refers to "all spirits in the background of electricity and data". An early version of the track listing was unveiled on June 28 through Pandora, along with previews of the tracks.

The album's release was postponed several times. It was originally scheduled to be released in November 2013, but the release was pushed back to January 2014 in order to avoid the rush of albums released for the Christmas period. On December 31, 2013, Harry stated in an interview on CNN's New Year's Eve Live that the album would be released in March 2014. The January 2014 issue of British magazine Mojo confirmed the album's release date as March 17, 2014, to be supplemented with Blondie's 40th Anniversary World Wide Tour. However, the release was ultimately delayed to May 13, 2014.

It was announced in the February 2014 issue of Vanity Fair magazine, for which Harry was photographed by Annie Leibovitz, that Ghosts of Download would be released as part of a two-disc package titled Blondie 4(0) Ever—coinciding with the band's 40th anniversary—which would also include an album of the band's greatest hits.

The first song released from Blondie 4(0) Ever was the re-recorded version on "Sunday Girl", which appeared on the soundtrack album to the 2013 film CBGB.

The final track listing for Blondie 4(0) Ever was revealed in late March 2014 on Pandora. The first disc, Greatest Hits Deluxe Redux, features brand-new studio recordings of 11 of Blondie's commercially successful singles, except "Maria", which appears in its original 1999 version. The deluxe edition includes the two-disc set, a DVD of Blondie's 1977 live performance at CBGB, a concert poster from 1979, and five postcards of Stein photos. Three additional Ghosts of Download bonus tracks were made available upon pre-ordering the digital album via iTunes and/or Amazon. The iTunes pre-order also included an instant free download of the song "I Want to Drag You Around".

== Artwork ==
The artwork for Ghosts of Download was designed by J. H. Williams III, who has previously worked for DC Comics and also created the cover art for the singles "A Rose by Any Name" and "Sugar on the Side". A high-quality version of the cover, with text reading "Blondie Ghosts of Download", was released to iTunes and Amazon at the end of April 2014. Further pages from the booklet (created by Williams) of the album, containing handwritten lyrics for select songs by members of the band, accompanied by skeletal images of them, were posted on Williams' website on April 22, 2014.

== Promotion ==
On March 20, 2013, Harry and Stein stopped by the talk show Soundcheck on WNYC 93.9 FM to premiere the track "Make a Way". The band embarked on the Blast Off Tour across Europe from June 11 to July 10, 2013. The band performed six songs from the album: "Rave", "A Rose by Any Name", "Take Me in the Night", "Winter", "I Want to Drag You Around", and "Sugar on the Side". Prior to this, Harry and Stein appeared on BBC One's The One Show to promote the new album and the Blast Off Tour, with Stein saying that he felt the new tracks were the best yet.

"A Rose by Any Name" was released on June 21, 2013, as the lead single from Ghosts of Download in Europe. On June 18, Blondie announced their North American No Principals Tour for fall 2013. Each ticket purchased for the tour included five tracks from the album: "Make a Way", "I Want to Drag You Around", "Can't Stop Wanting", "A Rose by Any Name", and "I Screwed Up". However, some fans received "Sugar on the Side" instead of "A Rose by Any Name". The song "Mile High" was debuted during the later shows of the tour.

On October 24, 2013, Harry appeared on the Project Runway All Stars (season 3) season 3 premiere as a guest judge, and the song "Sugar on the Side" debuted on the show's Twitter account during the episode. The track was later released on December 17, 2013, as the album's second single in North America.

The album's third single, "I Want to Drag You Around", made its world premiere on BBC Radio 2's The Ken Bruce Show on April 3, 2014. It was also named "Record of the Week" on BBC Radio 2 for the week beginning April 21, 2014. A lyric video for the song, featuring J. H. Williams III's graphics for the album, was uploaded to the band's official YouTube page on April 23. The official audios for "Sugar on the Side" (from Ghosts of Download) and the reworked version of "One Way or Another" (from Greatest Hits Deluxe Redux) were uploaded to YouTube on April 22, 2014, to promote the album. The official music video for "Sugar on the Side", directed by photographer Rankin, debuted exclusively on Hunger TV on April 30, 2014. The album itself became "Record of the Week" on BBC Radio 2 for the week beginning May 5, 2014, meaning that one song from the album was played each day on BBC Radio 2. From May 5 to 9, The Guardian streamed tracks from Ghosts of Download daily on its website via SoundCloud.

The band recorded a session at the BBC's Maida Vale Studios for the BBC Two show Newsnight on May 13, 2014, featuring new and older songs. On the same day, the band appeared on Good Morning America to perform "Sugar on the Side". Blondie also performed "Sugar on the Side" and "One Way or Another" on The Daily Show on May 14, followed by a performance of "Heart of Glass" on Live! with Kelly and Michael on May 19.

On May 24, 2014, the band embarked on a world tour in support of Blondie 4(0) Ever, including dates across North America and Europe. The tour commenced at the Tropicana Casino & Resort Atlantic City in Atlantic City, New Jersey, and concluded on October 3, 2014, at Harrah's Resort Southern California in Valley Center, California.

== Commercial performance ==
Professional ratings
Review scores
Source	Rating
AllMusic	3/5 stars
Consequence of Sound	D+
PopMatters	8/10
Rolling Stone	3.5/5 stars

Blondie 4(0) Ever entered the US Billboard 200 at number 109, selling 3,000 copies in its first week. The album debuted at number 16 on the UK Albums Chart with first-week sales of 4,148 copies. On occasion of Blondie's co-headlining Australia and New Zealand tour with Cyndi Lauper in April 2017, the album reached number six on the New Zealand Heatseeker Albums chart.

== Track listing ==
Disc one: Greatest Hits Deluxe Redux
No.	Title	Writer(s)	Producer(s)	Length
1.	"Heart of Glass"	Deborah Harry; Chris Stein	Kato Khandwala	4:32
2.	"Dreaming"	Harry; Stein	Khandwala	3:04
3.	"The Tide Is High"	John Holt	Khandwala	4:37
4.	"Maria"	Jimmy Destri	Craig Leon	4:05
5.	"Sunday Girl"	Stein	Khandwala	3:03
6.	"Hanging on the Telephone"	Jack Lee	Khandwala	2:19
7.	"Rapture"	Harry; Stein	Khandwala	5:32
8.	"One Way or Another"	Nigel Harrison; Harry	Khandwala	3:31
9.	"Call Me"	Harry; Giorgio Moroder	Khandwala	3:31
10.	"Atomic"	Harry; Destri	Khandwala	4:36
11.	"Rip Her to Shreds"	Harry; Stein	Khandwala	3:19
Total length:				42:09

Disc two: Ghosts of Download
No.	Title	Writer(s)	Producer(s)	Length
1.	"Sugar on the Side" (featuring Systema Solar)	Stein; Jeff Saltzman; Natalie Hawkins; Systema Solar	Saltzman; Stein	3:46
2.	"Rave" (featuring Miss Guy)	Harry; Stein; Saltzman; Hawkins	Saltzman; Stein	4:01
3.	"A Rose by Any Name" (featuring Beth Ditto)	Matt Katz-Bohen; Laurel Katz-Bohen; Harry^{[a]}; Stein^{[a]}; Jamie Siegel^{[a]}	M. Katz-Bohen; Jeremy Scherer^{[b]}; Siegel^{[b]}; Joe Tomino^{[b]}; Conrad Kaneshiro^{[b]}	3:34
4.	"Winter"	Harry; Stein; Saltzman; Hawkins	Saltzman; Stein	4:15
5.	"I Want to Drag You Around"	Matthew Barus	Saltzman; Stein	3:14
6.	"I Screwed Up" (featuring Los Rakas)	Harry; Stein; Saltzman; Hawkins; Mikael Johnston	Saltzman; Stein	3:59
7.	"Relax" (featuring Keilah Baez, Felicia Dennis and Keisha Williams)	Peter Gill; Holly Johnson; Brian Nash; Mark O'Toole	Saltzman; M. Katz-Bohen; Stein; Archie Ekong^{[b]}	5:49
8.	"Take Me in the Night"	M. Katz-Bohen; Dave Smith	M. Katz-Bohen; Saltzman	3:23
9.	"Make a Way"	Harry; Stein; Saltzman; Hawkins	Saltzman; Stein	3:55
10.	"Mile High"	Harry; Saltzman; Hector Fonseca; Jon Notar	Saltzman; Stein	3:38
11.	"Euphoria"	Harry; Stein; Saltzman; Hawkins	Saltzman; Stein	4:39
12.	"Take It Back"	Harry; Stein; Saltzman; Hawkins	Saltzman; Stein	3:45
13.	"Backroom"	Stein; Barbara Sicuranza; Saltzman	Saltzman; Stein	4:06
Total length:				53:04

Digital edition bonus tracks
No.	Title	Writer(s)	Producer(s)	Length
14.	"Put Some Color on You"	Harry; Saltzman; M. Katz-Bohen; L. Katz-Bohen; Lissy Trullie; Tommy Kessler	Saltzman; Stein; M. Katz-Bohen	3:52
15.	"Can't Stop Wanting"	Harry; Stein; Saltzman; Hawkins	Saltzman; Stein	3:10
16.	"Prism"	Harry; Stein; Saltzman; Hawkins	Saltzman; Stein	5:08
Total length:				65:14

Deluxe edition bonus DVD: Live at CBGB 1977
No.	Title	Writer(s)	Length
1.	"Kung Fu Girls"	Destri; Harry; Gary Lachman	3:36
2.	"In the Sun"	Stein	3:16
3.	"Little Girl Lies"	Harry	2:28
4.	"Look Good in Blue"	Destri	3:18
5.	"Man Overboard"	Stein; Harry	4:31
6.	"A Shark in Jets Clothing"	Destri	4:39
7.	"Rifle Range"	Stein	5:14
8.	"In the Flesh"	Stein; Harry	3:37
9.	"X-Offender"	Harry; Lachman	4:10
10.	"Youth Nabbed as a Sniper"	Stein	4:23
11.	"Rip Her to Shreds"	Harry; Stein	4:38
12.	"Heart Full of Soul"	Graham Gouldman	2:13
13.	"I Love Playing with Fire"	Joan Jett	2:22
14.	"Palisades Park"	Chuck Barris	2:24
15.	"Denis" (rehearsal)	Neil Levenson	2:11
Total length:			53:00

=== Notes ===
- ^{^[a]} Despite not being credited as songwriters of "A Rose by Any Name" in the album's liner notes, Deborah Harry, Chris Stein, and Jamie Siegel are listed as songwriters by ASCAP.
- ^{^[b]} signifies an additional producer
- "Relax" was omitted from the vinyl edition of the album.

== Personnel ==
Credits adapted from the liner notes of Blondie 4(0) Ever.

=== Greatest Hits Deluxe Redux ===
- Kato Khandwala – production (tracks 1–3, 5–11)
- Mark Needham – mixing
- Craig Leon – production (track 4)
- Ryan Ewing – additional cover treatment
- Trevor Niemann – design, layout
- Chris Stein – photos

=== Ghosts of Download ===
- Jeff Saltzman – production (tracks 1, 2, 4–13)
- Chris Stein – production (tracks 1, 2, 4–7, 9–13)
- Hernan Santiago – mixing (tracks 3, 11, 13)
- Paul David Hager – mixing (tracks 1, 2, 4–9, 12)
- Mikael Johnston – mixing (track 10)
- Marcussen Mastering – mastering
- J. H. Williams III – art direction, design
- Systema Solar – featured artist (track 1)
- Miss Guy – featured artist (track 2)
- Beth Ditto – featured artist (track 3)
- Matt Katz-Bohen – production (tracks 3, 7, 8)
- Jeremy Scherer – additional production (track 3)
- Jamie Siegel – additional production (track 3)
- Joe Tomino – additional production (track 3)
- Conrad Kaneshiro – additional production (track 3)
- Natalie Hawkins – additional vocals (track 5)
- Los Rakas – featured artist (track 6)
- Keliah Baez – featured artist (track 7)
- Felicia Dennis – featured artist (track 7)
- Keisha Williams – featured artist (track 7)
- Archie Ekong – additional production, programming (track 7)
- Hector Fonseca – additional vocals (track 10)

== Charts ==
2014 chart performance for Blondie 4(0) Ever
Chart (2014)	Peak position
Australian Albums (ARIA)	72
Belgian Albums (Ultratop Flanders)	106
Belgian Albums (Ultratop Wallonia)	75
Croatian Albums (HDU)	48
French Albums (SNEP)	118
German Albums (Offizielle Top 100)	44
Scottish Albums (Official Charts)	11
UK Albums (Official Charts)	16
US Billboard 200	109
US Independent Albums (Billboard)	21
US Top Alternative Albums (Billboard)	22
US Top Rock Albums (Billboard)	30

2017 chart performance for Blondie 4(0) Ever
Chart (2017)	Peak position
New Zealand Heatseeker Albums (RMNZ)	6

== Certifications ==
Certifications for Blondie 4(0) Ever
Region	Certification	Certified units/sales
United Kingdom (BPI)	Gold	100,000^{‡}
^{‡} Sales+streaming figures based on certification alone.

== Release history ==
Release dates and formats for Blondie 4(0) Ever
Region	Date	Format	Edition	Label	Ref(s)
France	May 12, 2014	Digital download	Standard	Caroline	
United Kingdom	May 12, 2014	2-CD; digital download	Standard	Caroline	
United Kingdom	May 12, 2014	2-CD + DVD	Deluxe	Caroline	
Canada	May 13, 2014	2-CD; digital download	Standard	Universal	
Canada	May 13, 2014	2-CD + DVD	Deluxe	Universal	
United States	May 13, 2014	2-CD; digital download	Standard	Noble ID	
United States	May 13, 2014	2-CD + DVD	Deluxe	Noble ID	
Japan	May 14, 2014	Digital download	Standard	Hostess	
Germany	May 16, 2014	2-CD; digital download	Standard	Caroline	
Germany	May 16, 2014	2-CD + DVD	Deluxe	Caroline	
France	May 19, 2014	2-CD	Standard	Caroline	
France	May 19, 2014	2-CD + DVD	Deluxe	Caroline	
Australia	May 23, 2014	2-CD; digital download	Standard	Universal	
Australia	May 23, 2014	2-CD + DVD	Deluxe	Universal	
Canada	June 10, 2014	LP + DVD	Standard	Universal	
United States	June 10, 2014	LP + DVD	Standard	Caroline	
Japan	July 2, 2014	2-CD	Standard	Hostess	
