= Ball of Confusion Tour =

2024 concert tour by Blondie

- Tour by Blondie
- Location: Europe; North America; Oceania
- Start date: April 20, 2024
- End date: June 19, 2024
- Legs: 1
- No. of shows: 11

Blondie concert chronology
- Against The Odds Tour (2022); Ball of Confusion (2024)

Ball of Confusion was the thirteenth headlining tour by the American new wave band, Blondie. The tour took place from April 20, 2024, to June 19, 2024, with shows in Australia, North America and Europe.

It was the band's final tour before the death of drummer, Clem Burke, in April 2025.

== Background ==
Like the band's previous tour, the line-up featured former Sex Pistols bassist, Glen Matlock, covering for Leigh Foxx, who retired from the band's touring in 2022, and also did not feature founding member, Chris Stein, on guitar.

The tour began on April 20, at the Pandemonium Music Festival in Melbourne, Australia with further dates following in Australia until April 27, in Gold Coast. Two dates in North America followed in early May, playing at Mission Ballroom in Denver, Colorado and the Cruel World Festival in Pasadena, California.

The tour progressed into Europe with two sold-out dates at The Piece Hall in Halifax, West Yorkshire with further dates in Spain, Ireland and Northern Ireland, where the first leg concluded in Belfast at Belsonic music festival. This was to be Clem Burke's final performance with Blondie, before his death from cancer on April 8, 2025.

Originally, a second leg of the tour, featuring dates in Vancouver, Carnation, Troutdale and St. Louis was announced, but was subsequently cancelled in July 2024. An official statement from the band did not state a reason for the cancellation, but said that it was a 'hard decision to make'.

== Set list ==
This set list is taken from the June 9 concert at The Piece Hall, Halifax. It does not represent the set list for all tour dates.

1. "One Way Or Another"
2. "Hanging On The Telephone"
3. "Sunday Girl"
4. "Call Me"
5. "Living In The Real World"
6. "Will Anything Happen?"
7. "Atomic"
8. "X Offender"
9. "In The Flesh"
10. "Rapture"
11. "The Tide Is High"
12. "Long Time"
13. "Maria"
14. "Heart Of Glass"
15. "Dog Star Girl" (Deborah Harry song)
16. "Dreaming"

Notes

- "Fun" and "Denis" were played on April 20, but were dropped from the set after this date.
- "Nothing Is Real But The Girl" was played at all Australian dates, but was dropped after the performance in Denver on May 8.
- This tour marked the first live performances of "Living In The Real World" since 1998.

== Tour dates ==
List of 2024 concerts
Date	City	Country	Venue
April 20, 2024	Melbourne	Australia	Pandemonium Melbourne
April 23, 2024	Newcastle	Australia	Newcastle Entertainment Centre
April 25, 2024	Sydney	Australia	Pandemonium Sydney
April 27, 2024	Gold Coast	Australia	Pandemonium Gold Coast
May 8, 2024	Denver	United States	Mission Ballroom
May 11, 2024	Pasadena	United States	Cruel World
June 7, 2024	Halifax	England	The Piece Hall
June 9, 2024	Halifax	England	The Piece Hall
June 13, 2024	Mallorca	Spain	Mallorca Live Festival
June 16, 2024	Plymouth	England	The Borgata
June 18, 2024	Cork	Ireland	Virgin Media Park
June 19, 2024	Belfast	Northern Ireland	Belsonic

=== Cancelled dates ===
Date	City	Country	Venue
August 21, 2024	Vancouver	Canada	Pacific Coliseum
August 23, 2024	Carnation	United States	Remlinger Farms
August 25, 2024	Troutdale	United States	McMenamins Historic Edgefield Manor
September 28, 2024	St. Louis	United States	Evolution Festival

== Personnel ==
- Debbie Harry – vocals
- Clem Burke – drums, percussion
- Glen Matlock – bass
- Matt Katz-Bohen – keyboards
- Tommy Kessler – guitar
- Andee Blacksugar – guitar
