= I Want to Drag You Around =

Single by Blondie

from the album Ghosts of Download
- Released: April 3, 2014 (UK radio); April 22, 2014 (worldwide)
- Recorded: 2012/2013
- Genre: Electronica, Pop rock
- Length: 3:24
- Label: Noble ID; Five Seven Music; Caroline Records
- Songwriters: Matt Barus; Lauren Mitchell(uncredited)
- Producers: Chris Stein; Jeff Saltzman

Blondie singles chronology
"Sugar On the Side" (2013)	"I Want to Drag You Around" (2014)	"Fun" (2017)

"I Want to Drag You Around" is the third single from the band Blondie's tenth studio album Ghosts of Download. It was released officially along with the rest of the album in May 2014, although it was released before that as a free digital download with tickets to the 2013 North American No Principals Tour under the title "Drag You Around". It was announced in March 2014 as the third single from Ghosts of Download, and was BBC Radio 2's Record of the Week from 19 April 2014.

== Background and release ==
The song was first announced in May 2013 during a UK newspaper interview where singer Debbie Harry sung a verse of the song, which was described as a toe-tapper. It was first performed live in June 2013 and appeared on the setlists of both of Blondie's tours that year, the Blast Off Tour and the No Principals Tour, although it was only featured during selected shows.

It was written by Matt Barus, frontman of Christchurch band The Dukes, who supported Blondie on a small 2010 New Zealand tour, and Barus has named his wife Lauren Mitchell as a contributor to the song, although Mitchell is uncredited in the album booklet. Chris Stein, guitarist for Blondie, asked if Barus wrote songs for other artists. Barus responded that he didn't, but he'd have a go. He described the process as: "I said sure, thinking 'yeah, cool, lots of people say nice things to you in the music industry'. But I went off and wrote a couple of songs and emailed them to him anyway, really rough demo versions, and I didn't hear from him for about a year. And then he started emailing back saying, 'we're starting to record some new tracks, and we're interested in using one of your songs'." Barus also wrote a second song entitled “Hollow Man” which he preferred, but learned that Blondie were already working on “Drag You Around”.

Describing the album to GQ in May 2014, Stein, who also produced the song along with Jeff Saltzman, commented:

"A guy called Matt Barus wrote this one, from a New Zealand band called The Dukes. They opened for us in New Zealand and I thought they were a great combination of modern worldbeat sounds and what they do as a band is really interesting. We kept in touch and they sent this demo of a song and we kept developing it. It's not that they thought the song was perfect for Blondie, just one we would like as people. And we did. They sent an acoustic demo and it took us a while to come up with an arrangement. The sitar is played by a guy Matt knew in high school, they used to be in a band together and hadn't seen each other in years."

The song was released to UK radio on April 3, 2014, and was featured as a free download with purchase of the iTunes edition of Ghosts of Download. On April 23, 2014, a lyric video was made available on YouTube. The video features additional artwork by J. H. Williams III who did the artwork and design for the Ghosts of Download album, and animation by Jay Holmes. Some early promotional CDs advertising the single announced it as having a May 19, 2014, release, a week after the release of "Ghosts of Download", although no public launch for the single occurred.

== Composition ==
The song is a gentle pop-rock song including synthesizers and some oriental instruments such as sitars. It includes percussion complementing the synthesizer melody. It was produced by The Killers producer Jeff Saltzman, who produced the rest of the album, and Blondie's co-founder Chris Stein, although it was initially announced erroneously as being produced by Steve Lillywhite. Lyrically the song describes a man in a relationship who isn't always there, and the singer (Debbie Harry) wants to keep in control of him: “I wanna drag you around”.

== Reception ==
Popmatters.com reviewed the song in May 2014: "World music is a fitting descriptor for much of the album. “I Want to Drag You Around” is a dreamy low-key, but still danceable, reggae-inspired track that sounds like a summer day on the beach with drink in hand."
