= Sugar on the Side =

Single by Blondie and Systema Solar

from the album Ghosts of Download
- Released: December 17, 2013
- Genre: Alternative; dance-pop; synthpop; tecnocumbia
- Length: 3:47
- Label: Noble ID; Five Seven Music; Caroline Records
- Songwriters: Chris Stein; Jeff Saltzman; Natalie Hawkins; Systema Solar
- Producers: Chris Stein; Jeff Saltzman

Blondie singles chronology
"A Rose by Any Name" (2013)	"Sugar on the Side" (2013)	"I Want to Drag You Around" (2014)

Systema Solar singles chronology
"La Rana" (2013)	"Sugar on the Side" (2013)

"Sugar on the Side" is the opening track on, and second single from, Blondie's tenth studio album Ghosts of Download. It was released as a digital download on December 17, 2013, in the US and Canada, but has not been released in any other countries. The song features the Colombian hip-hop/cumbia band Systema Solar.

== Background and release ==
The song was written by Blondie's co-founder and guitarist Chris Stein, who contributed to most of the tracks on the album, as well as Jeff Saltzman, the band's producer of two albums, and Natalie Hawkins, Saltzman's assistant. Systema Solar also provided the Spanish lyrics for their rap verses in the song. Stein, Saltzman and Hawkins also contributed to most of the tracks on the album.

Musically, the song is a dance-pop and synthpop song, as with the rest of "Ghosts of Download", although this song included elements of Latin-American music genres such as cumbia; Chris Stein had been commenting in interviews during 2013 that he was very interested in Latin American music and had been listening to a lot of it, so he incorporated that sound into the album, such as in a GQ interview in May 2014 where he said: "I was just influenced by a lot of the current music I'm listening to, especially modern Latin music." In the same interview, Stein commented of this track:

"I first heard Systema Solar via one track on a compilation record and then I went out and bought their album and listened to it consistently for quite a while. It's just terrific stuff, my Spanish is really lousy but there's something super fresh that's going on with modern Latin music. I like reggaeton, cumbia styles and all the electronica is great. They came back to us right away when we asked them if they would like to be on the record, but they were sometimes hard to get hold of. After we already started working with them, we were waiting for some stuff from one of the guys and he appeared a couple of days later apologising that he'd been in the jungle and didn't have any internet! Debbie has since sung with them on their second record on a really nice track. There's a musical conversation we're having, we have a lot of respect for them, they're awesome guys."

The song is largely made up of keyboard parts and music created by computer programs electronically, as with the rest of the album.

Like the band's previous single, "A Rose by Any Name", "Sugar on the Side" had its live premiere in June 2013 at Moscow Arena Club as part of the band's 2013 Blast Off Tour. After this it became a part of their live setlist, with it being performed at almost all live shows from June 2013 onwards.

The song was performed on the fashion show Project Runway during the season 3 premiere, which aired October 25, 2013, and featured Debbie Harry as a guest judge. The song was made available to viewers on social networking site Twitter, and was uploaded to YouTube, with a montage of the episode.

In mid-May 2014 to promote the release of the album, the band performed the song live on the US TV shows Good Morning America and The Daily Show. The song was also the opening track of a live performance at the BBC's historic Maida Vale Studios, which was recorded in February 2014 and broadcast in the UK in May 2014 on various TV and radio shows to promote the album.

Lead singer Debbie Harry previously provided vocals on the Systema Solar track "Artificial", from their second studio album La Revancha del Burro, which was released October 29, 2013.

== Music video ==
The official music video for "Sugar on the Side" was directed by photographer Rankin and debuted exclusively on Hunger TV on April 30, 2014. It was shot in black and white and consists on Deborah Harry singing and dancing to the song behind white walls with geometrical gaps. It also contains the song lyrics printed on white spaces.

=== Credits ===
- Director – Rankin
- Fashion editor – Laura Jones
- Fashion assistant – Dina Chappo
- Hair – Shalom Sharon at ABTP using Oribe
- Makeup – Genevieve using Edward Bess
- Nails – Dawn Sterling at Melbourne Artists Management
- Location – Milk Studios, New York
- Camera operators – Rankin Film
- Editor – Gary Coogan

== Track listings ==
Digital download
No.	Title	Writer(s)	Length
1.	"Sugar on the Side"	Chris Stein, Jeff Saltzman, Natalie Hawkins, Systema Solar	3:46
