= Hector Fonseca =

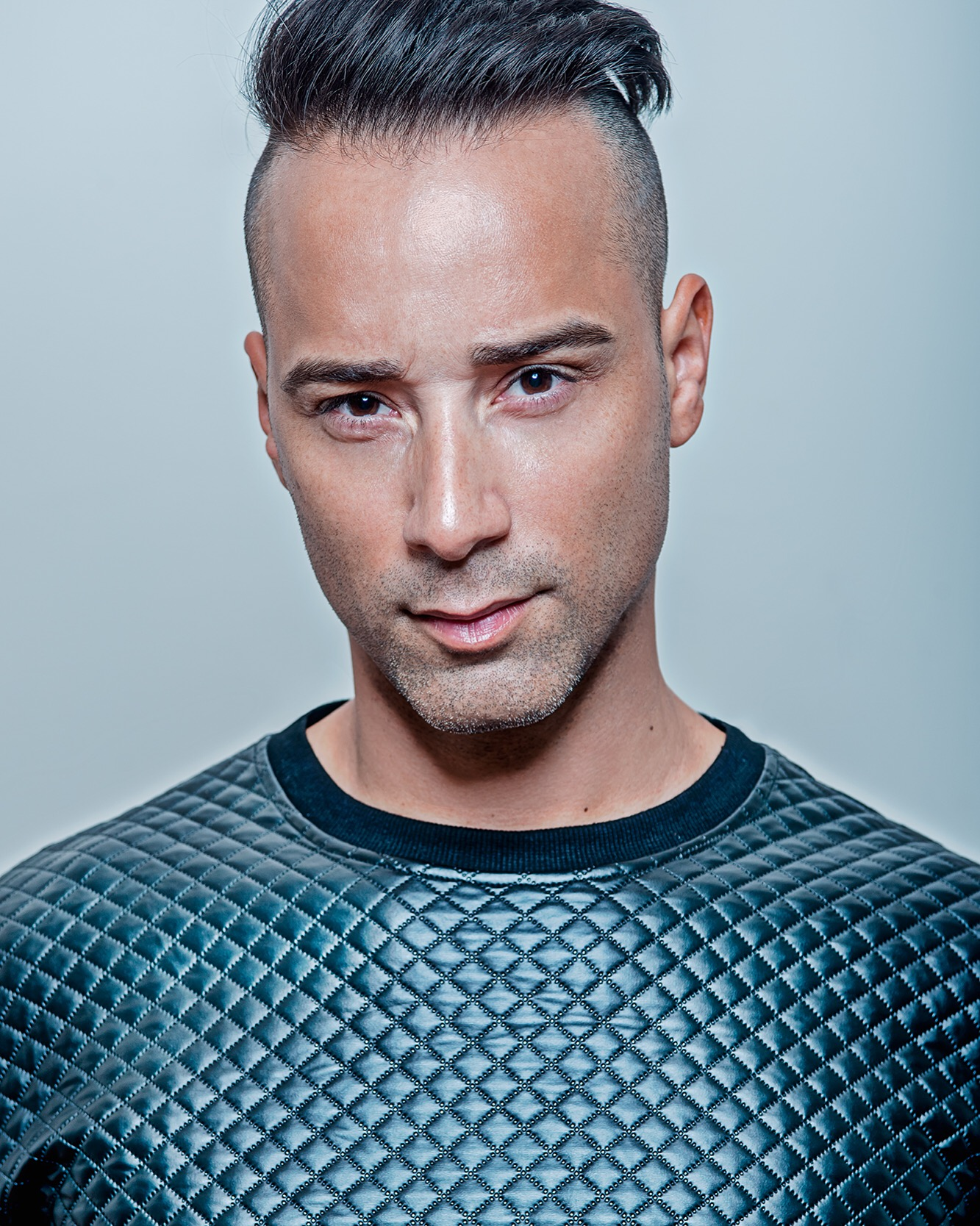

Background information
- Born: January 10, 1980 (age 46)
- Origin: Clifton, New Jersey, United States
- Genres: House
- Occupations: Disc Jockey, Remixer
- Years active: 2002 – present
- Labels: Audio4Play, Star 69 Records
- Website: Official Website

Hector Fonseca (born January 10, 1980, in the Bronx, New York City, New York) is an American house music DJ. In addition to his production and DJ work, Fonseca is a popular remixer.

== Biography ==
Raised in suburban Clifton, New Jersey, in a Puerto Rican family, Fonseca started his career as a fashion model. He enrolled at the University of Pennsylvania where he studied business administration. He left his studies to focus on the tribal and house music scene emerging in New York during the late 1990s.

Fonseca has remixed songs by Sia, Lady Gaga, Rihanna, Katy Perry, Beyoncé, Pet Shop Boys and Blondie. As a DJ, he has headlined parties such as including Matinee, World Pride, The White Party, Alegria, The Week, Rapido, Beyond, G Village and the Circuit Festival. He cites the late Grammy Award-winning DJ, producer, and remixer Peter Rauhofer as his mentor.

In 2013, Fonseca produced his first original composition, a collaboration with Blondie titled "Mile High".
