= Kidnapper (Blondie song) =

Song by Blondie

from the album Plastic Letters
- Released: February 1978
- Genre: Rock
- Label: Chrysalis Records

"Kidnapper" is a song by American rock band Blondie, being released in 1977 as the lead single for the album Plastic Letters in Japan, and as the 11th track of the album in the rest of the world. The song was originally released in 1977 on a Japan-exclusive vinyl single, the song was also later released as an album track in 1978.

== Music and lyrics ==
"Kidnapper" is a rock song with a low to moderate tempo with lead singer Debbie Harry providing vocals with drummer Clem Burke playing a moderately paced drum set.
