= Los Rakas =

American hip hop group

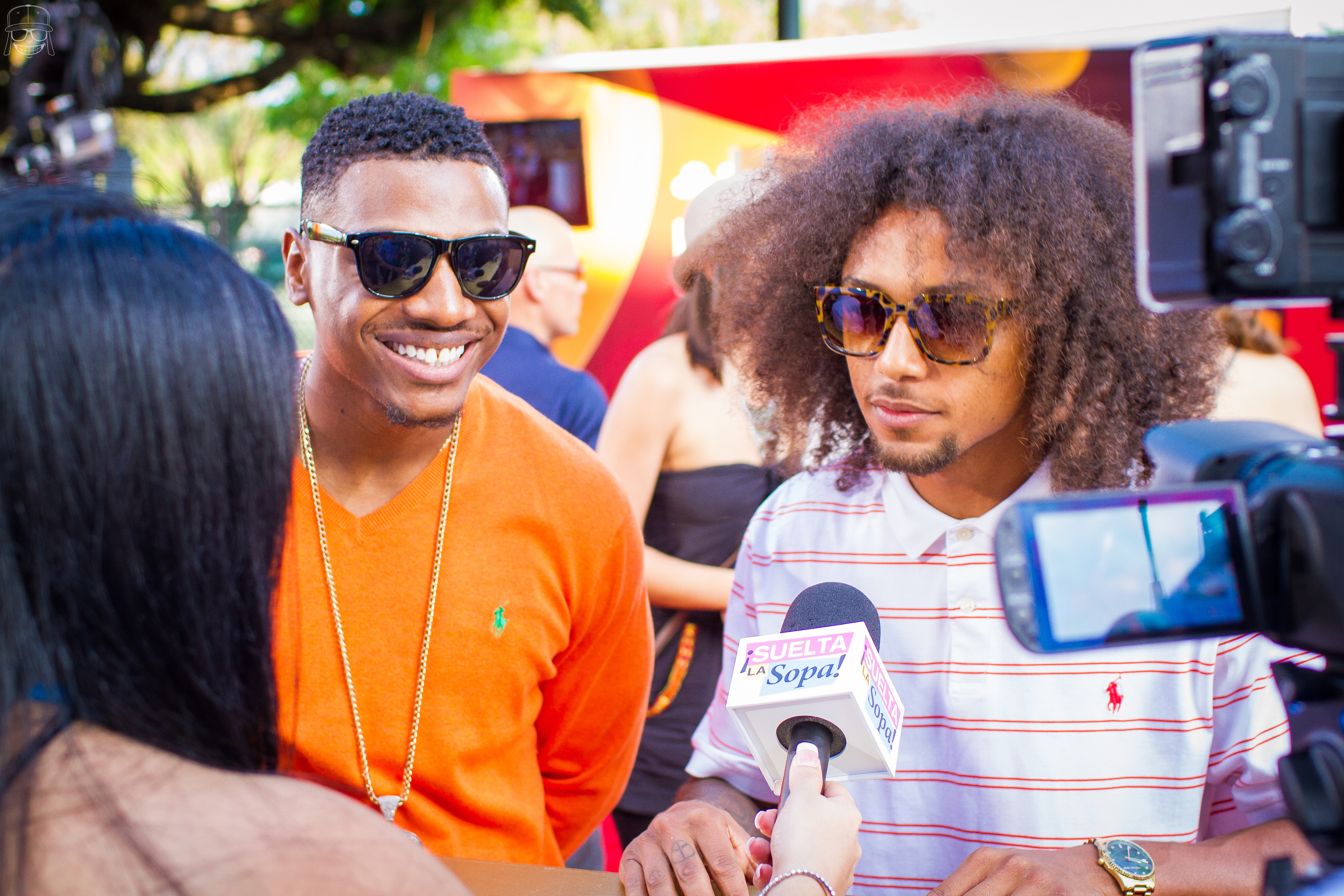
- Los Rakas in 2014

Background information
- Origin: East Oakland, California, U.S.
- Genres: Hip hop, reggaeton, reggae, dancehall
- Years active: 2006–present
- Members: Raka Rich; Raka Dun
- Website: losrakas.com

Los Rakas are a Grammy Award–nominated bilingual hip hop group based in Oakland, California, consisting of Panamanian cousins Raka Rich and Raka Dun. Their style consists of a mixture of hip hop influences with reggaeton, reggae, and dancehall. One of their notable collaborations includes the American new Wave band Blondie on their 2014 studio album Ghosts of Download, where they appeared as a featured artist on the track "I Screwed Up". Other collaborations include music with: E-40, Nina Sky, Baby Bash, Berner, Keak Da Sneak, Kool John, San Quinn, Show Banga, X-raided, Goapale, IAMSU!, Baby Gas, & Atropolis. As of 04/20/22 Los Rakas have partnered with Camabis to release their own cannabis strain "Raka Exotic". They are currently working on a new studio album expected to drop between late 2022 and early 2023.

== Background ==
Both members are of Panamanian descent. The duo met in East Oakland, California, at a relative's house when they were teenagers. The group began in earnest by producing and releasing mixtapes alongside remixes of other songs. They both participated in the Bay Area Video Coalition's after-school youth program for music production called BUMP, the Bay Unity Music Project. At BUMP they made and produced their own album Panabay Twist under the BUMP Records label.

Raka Rich was born in Northern California and moved to Panama City as a child, where he lived until he was 12. From childhood, he was drawn to music and seduced by the variations between sound and rhythm. Soon, he began writing his own lyrics mixing a variety of different styles.

Raka Dun is one of ten children and was raised in the barrio of Nuevo Veranillo, Panama. Raka Dun began entertaining at the age of ten, touring his home country with a traditional folkloric dance group.

Both members of the duo are proud of their Californian and Panamanian upbringing.

Los Rakas derive their name from the Panamanian word "Rakataka," a colloquial term for someone from the ghetto, or an impoverished neighborhood. Part of the group's philosophy is to uplift and represent those from difficult backgrounds. Therefore, in regards to the name Raka Dun has explained “we decided to call ourselves Los Rakas is to show the world that not everything that comes from the ghetto is negative.”

When they were at the age of one year old and five years old, both of their dads died. When Raka Rich was six years old, his mom died, making him into an orphan. When Raka Dun was 19 years old, his mom died, making him into an orphan. Together, they then decided to meet up to talk about each others parents, sparking an interest in one another. When they accidentally figured out they were related, they decided to talk about their family again, but waited nearly four years to do so.

== Music ==
The duo began producing music in the mid 2000s. They began to find success with the release of their song "Bounce" in 2006, with a style they termed "Pana-Bay." They continued developing their sound with the release of two mixtapes, Panabay Twist in 2006 and Panabay Twist 2: La Tanda del Bus in 2009.

In 2010, Los Rakas entered a new era of their career with their hand-picked slot alongside Cypress Hill, Snoop Dogg, Erykah Badu, and Manu Chao at Snoop Dogg's Smoke Out Festival. From there, the group has gone on to release their debut EP Chancletas y Camisetas Bordada and recorded the track "Desorden" with prolific producer Diplo. They have also gone on to collaborate with Blondie on the song I Screwed Up.

Their work has culminated in their full-length album released in 2014, El Negrito Dun Dun & Ricardo. The eclectic album spans a series of genres, ranging from EDM to rap to soul. In the style of Outkast and many other artists, the album is split into two halves devoted to the two respective members of Los Rakas.

Los Rakas have achieved the bulk of their widespread success without a major label. Their music is released via iTunes, but they also release tracks for free via Bandcamp. Most recently, their release El Negrito Dun Dun y Ricardo was released on Universal Latino. They continue to be on the path towards increased recognition and credibility in both the Latino and Urban music markets.

Their song "Hot" from the album El Negrito Dun Dun y Ricardo was featured in the soundtrack of the Electronic Arts videogame FIFA 14.

As of Valentine's day 2017, they have released Raka Love 2 . Their 2019 album Manes De Negocio is described by Remezcla as a “socially conscious trap soiree”. They released their single "Se Prendio" on apple music in 2021.

The duo headlined the 44th annual "Carnaval Festival" in San Francisco over Memorial Day weekend of summer 2022.

== Discography ==
- Panabay Twist (2006)
- Panabay Twist 2: La Tanda del Bus (2009)
- Chancletas y Camisetas Bordada (2011)
- Raka Love (2012)
- El Negrito Dun Dun y Ricardo (2014)
- Raka Love 2 (2017)
- Manes de Negocios (2019)
- Raka Love 3 (TBD)
