= High Noon (Blondie album) =

Studio album by Blondie
- Released: February 26, 2027
- Recorded: 2022–2025
- Studios: New York Studio, NY
- Genres: Punk rock; new wave
- Label: BMG
- Producer: John Congleton

Blondie chronology
Against the Odds: 1974–1982 (2022)	High Noon (2027)

Blondie studio albums chronology
Pollinator (2017)	High Noon (2027)

Singles from High Noon
- 1. "Spectral Eyes" Released: October 15, 2026; 2. "Come Back Home" Released: November 20, 2026

High Noon is the upcoming twelfth studio album by the American rock band Blondie, scheduled to be released on February 26, 2027, through BMG. This will be the band’s first album in 10 years, and the first to be released since the death of Clem Burke.

== Background and recording ==
In a 2022 Mancunion interview, Clem Burke confirmed plans for an upcoming album following Pollinator. He stated that it would also be produced by John Congleton, maintain the same sound, and prioritize direct collaboration among band members in the studio and during the songwriting process. He also noted that numerous demos had already been recorded.

In June 2024, Chris Stein announced a spring 2025 release during an interview with Chris Hawkins on BBC Radio 6 Music, which he reconfirmed in an Instagram post later that October.

On April 7, 2025, Clem Burke's death was announced. However, his presence on all tracks was confirmed, as the album was completely recorded between 2022 and 2025, prior to his death. Later in August, the album's title was officially announced alongside a revised release date targeting spring 2026. Debbie Harry explained that the name came from the lyrics of one of her older songs and represented "a continuity with the way that we think and the way that we lead our lives."

On October 15, 2026, the band officially announced a release date of February 26, 2027, and released the album's lead single, "Spectral Eyes". The song was written by Johnny Marr and had previously appeared as a B-side to the single "Spiral Cities" from his album Call the Comet; he and Glen Matlock are both featured on the track. Along with the announcement, the studio where the album was recorded, the cover art created by Rob Roth, the tracklist, and the inclusion of other guests such as Zach Condon, Jess Wolfe, and Holly Laessig were revealed.

== Music ==
The album's music has been described as punk rock and new wave with Latin rhythms and dance music elements. Debbie Harry said that the band would maintain its tradition "to cover a lot of different styles and to embody some different moods."

== Track listing ==
High Noon track listing
No.	Title	Length
1.	"Spectral Eyes"
2.	"Heartbreak Kid"
3.	"Come Back Home"
4.	"Tambo Tambo"
5.	"Man Who Had No Face"
6.	"The End"
7.	"Little Metal Drummer"
8.	"Sleepwalking"
9.	"Whistle into the Wind"
10.	"Antifreeze"
11.	"East of Eden"
12.	"Bad Underwear"
13.	"Ah, Sunflower, Weary of Time"
