= Make a Way =

Promotional single by Blondie

from the album Ghosts of Download
- Released: May 12, 2014
- Recorded: 2012–2013
- Genre: Dance-pop
- Length: 3:55
- Label: Noble ID; Five Seven Music; Caroline Records
- Songwriters: Chris Stein; Debbie Harry; Jeff Saltzman; Natalie Hawkins
- Producers: Jeff Saltzman; Chris Stein

"Make a Way" is a song from the band Blondie's tenth studio album Ghosts of Download. It was released officially along with the rest of the album in May 2014, although it was released before that as a free digital download with tickets to the band's 2013 North American tour.

== Background and release ==
The song was first announced during a March 2013 edition of US radio show SoundCloud, where Debbie Harry and Chris Stein guested. Stein spoke briefly about the origins of the song, and how he initially began to experiment with "a Turkish groove" that evolved into a more dance-influenced pop song. He said he wrote it with Jeff Saltzman, who also produced it, and a minute-long sample was played. The full song was released as a download with tickets to the No Principals Tour in Spring/Summer 2013. Lyrically it includes lines about how "club life is living inside me, better not hide B, 'cos I wanna go oh, to the show, to the dance hall, so everyone knows." The chorus explores a meaningful relationship: "I wanna make a way, for us/'Cos I can't live without this in my universe".

The song was featured on BBC Radio 2's Ken Bruce Show on May 5, 2014, when its parent album became Record of the Week, and it received a full release on May 12 along with the rest of "Ghosts of Download". The song's lyrics are featured in the album's booklet, handwritten by the band's frontwoman Debbie Harry. Talking about the album to GQ, Chris Stein said: "This is a key track on the album in that the acoustic and electronic came together for the first time. This has almost an eastern beat, it started with a crazy Turkish groove. I love middle Eastern music. Recently, I've been looking Iraqi and Iranian hip hop which is fascinating, you can dig a lot of it out on Youtube. I liked the old school middle eastern music too and this evolved from that."

As of June 2014, the song, which was recorded at Mercy Sound Recording Studios in New York City and Skyline Studios in Oakland, has not received any live performances.
