= Rob Roth =

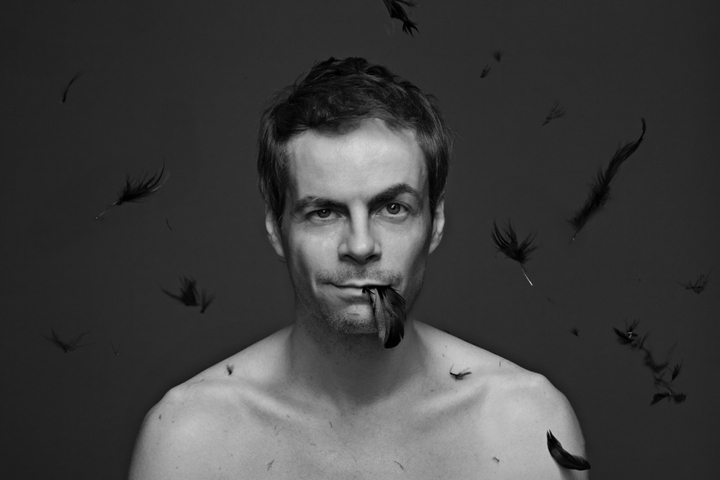
- Born: December 18, 1968 (age 57); New York City, New York, U.S.
- Known for: Film, video art, visual art, installation, theater, performance
- Website: rob-roth.com

Rob Roth is an American multidisciplinary artist and director, based in New York City.

He works in a variety of media including theater, video, sculpture and performance.

== Education and career ==
Roth received a Bachelor of Fine Arts degree from Pratt Institute and has exhibited different work at a variety of venues, including the New Museum, Performance Space 122, HERE Arts Center, the Museum of Arts and Design, and Deitch Projects.

His work had its early fertilization in the 1990s New York City nightlife arena, most notably at the underground nightclub Jackie 60 / MOTHER, as well as The Black Party.

In 2018, Roth premiered the theater piece Soundstage, featuring actress Rebecca Hall. He also directed the music video Doom or Destiny by Blondie featuring Joan Jett which appeared on several "Best of 2017" lists as well as performing in Atlas Obscura's site-specific Into the Veil event at Green-Wood Cemetery in Brooklyn.

In 2016, Roth presented his site-specific sound installation Night Paving: The Aural History of Jackie 60 and Mother on New York City's High Line.

Roth was the creative director on Debbie Harry's memoir Face It as well as directing the short film Blondie: Vivir En La Habana which had its North American premiere at the 2021 Tribeca Film Festival.
