= A Rose by Any Name =

Single by Blondie and Beth Ditto

from the album Ghosts of Download
- Released: June 21, 2013 (Europe)
- Recorded: 2012
- Genre: Dance-rock
- Length: 3:34
- Label: Noble ID; Five Seven Music; Caroline Records
- Songwriters: Matt Katz-Bohen, Laurel Katz-Bohen
- Producers: Matt Katz-Bohen; Joe Tomino (additional production); Conrad Kaneshiro (additional production); Jeremy Scherer (additional production); Jamie Siegel (additional production)

Blondie singles chronology
"What I Heard" (2011)	"A Rose by Any Name" (2013)	"Sugar on the Side" (2013)

Beth Ditto singles chronology
"I Wrote the Book" (2011)	"A Rose by Any Name" (2013)	"Running Low" (2014)

"A Rose by Any Name" is a 2013 song by the American new wave band Blondie. It was the lead single from the band's tenth studio album Ghosts of Download, released as a digital download in Europe on June 21, 2013 (eleven months ahead of its parent album), though it was never released in the U.S. The song features The Gossip's frontwoman Beth Ditto on lead vocals with Debbie Harry.

== Background and release ==
The song was written by Blondie's keyboardist Matt Katz-Bohen and his wife Laurel Katz-Bohen, who had previously penned two songs for the band's previous album, including the single "What I Heard". Debbie Harry has commented that Laurel Katz-Bohen was expecting a baby when the song was written, although the couple were unsure of their gender - this is the meaning of the chorus lyric "if you're a boy or if you're a girl, I'll love you just the same".

The song had its live premiere in June 2013 at the Moscow Arena club in Moscow, Russia, along with several other songs from the upcoming album. On June 20, 2013, the studio version of the song was premiered on the Ken Bruce show on BBC Radio 2. and was made available to listen on the band's official website.

The song was one of five from the new album to be given away as a free download with each ticket purchased for the band's U.S. No Principals Tour in 2013.

== Artwork ==
The artwork for "A Rose by Any Name" was created by J. H. Williams III, who is also the artist behind the artwork for the album, Ghosts of Download. Williams also created the artwork for the album's second single "Sugar on the Side".

== Track listings ==
Digital download
No.	Title	Writer(s)	Length
1.	"A Rose by Any Name" (featuring Beth Ditto)	Matt Katz-Bohen; Laurel Katz-Bohen	3:34
