= Matt Katz-Bohen =

American musician

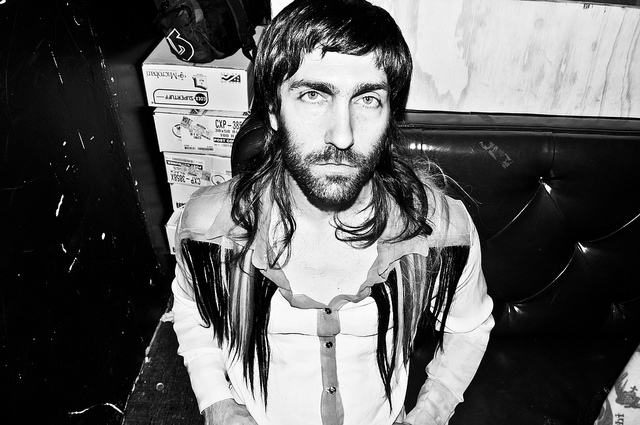
- Katz-Bohen at the former Tammany Hall Bldg. (NYC) Spring/Summer 2012

Background information
- Born: Matthew Jeremy Katz-Bohen; May 27, 1977 (age 49); Manhattan, U.S.
- Genres: Alternative rock; new wave; dance rock
- Occupations: Musician; songwriter; producer
- Instruments: Keyboards; guitar
- Years active: 1996–present
- Member of: Blondie; Princess Goes
- Formerly of: Daddy; GoonSquad
- Spouse: Laurel Barclay

Matthew Jeremy Katz-Bohen is an American multi-instrumentalist, songwriter, and producer. He co-founded the group Princess Goes in 2018 with Peter Yanowitz and Michael C. Hall. Since 2008, he has been the keyboardist for Debbie Harry and Blondie.

== Early life ==
Katz-Bohen was born in New York City. He started playing piano, and then guitar, in elementary school. He then attended the Fiorello H. LaGuardia High School (the "Fame" School) in New York City, where he studied violin and composition. He then attended Bard College.

== As an accompanying performer ==
Katz-Bohen joined Bob Dylan on the 2025 Outlaw Music Festival tour. He has backed Boy George, Ashford & Simpson, Jody Watley, Lady Miss Kier, John Cameron Mitchell, Debbie Harry (as a solo artist), the Toilet Böys, and Princess Superstar. He joined industrial legends Psychic TV (PTV3) on bass guitar for their 2008 European tour. He was Music Director and lead guitarist at Misstress Formika's NYC weekly "Area" party from 2005-2010. As a keyboardist, in 2013 he performed on a single; Every Empire – Change (Beep Beep) In 2015, Katz-Bohen accompanied Harry during a two-week residency from March 24 – April 4 at the Café Carlyle. From 2015-2017, he served as substitute music director (substituting for Justin Craig) in the Broadway production of Hedwig And The Angry Inch, and performed in the production on both keys and guitar. When the production began its national tour October 2016, Katz-Bohen assumed the role as Associate Conductor through the end of the tour in mid-2017. In late 2018 and continuing into 2019 when Blondie is not touring, Katz-Bohen often performs on keys with Cyndi Lauper.

== As a member of Daddy (1999–2007) ==
After Katz-Bohen met his future wife, Laurel Barclay, in elementary school, they began composing and performing songs, forming Variety City in 1996. Playing primarily in NYC, the couple performed under that name with a changing line-up of musicians through 1998. Then in 1999, they changed the band's name to Daddy. Daddy's members were Matt (guitar), Laurel (vocals, keyboards), James Caputo (bass), and Ben Ritter (drums). Garnering the praise of Thurston Moore of Sonic Youth, who told him, "the sounds/arrangements are totally cool...inspired", they received press in a number of New York City magazines such as the Village Voice, Interview Magazine, and the Paper Magazine. Ned Vizzini of the New York Press characterized their sound as, "Cross David Bowie with Black Flag and 'Cabaret' and you get NYC's own Daddy, of course." In 2005, Matt and Laurel won a SESAC Songwriters Hall of Fame Abe Olman scholarship award. Daddy often played the legendary Squeezebox parties, and in 2006–2007, toured the United States and Canada.

== As a member of GoonSquad (2006–2010) ==
GoonSquad was formed with Matt, Laurel, and Guy Furrow. In 2006, Katz-Bohen was frequently playing with Furrow (aka Miss Guy of the Toilet Böys) at the night club "Speed" on 39th street. Furrow was the DJ and Katz-Bohen played guitar in the house band. Different celebrities, artists and performers would come sing with the band.

== As a member of Princess Goes ==
In 2018 Katz-Bohen formed Princess Goes, performing on keyboards and guitars, with Michael C. Hall (Hedwig) singing, and Peter Yanowitz (The Wallflowers, Natalie Merchant, Morningwood) on drums and backing vocals. Katz-Bohen's daughter came up with the name of her father's new band. As of September 2024, they have toured throughout the US, UK, and Europe. Their eponymous debut EP featured the song "Ketamine", which was also an end credit feature in Dexter: New Blood. Their song "Eat an Eraser" was used as an end credit feature in Episode 5 of Dexter: Resurrection.

In 2021, the band self-released their first album, Thanks for Coming on their label, Morpho Music. They released a second album, Come of Age in October 2023; renaming the band "Princess Goes".

== As a member of Blondie (2008–present) ==
Katz-Bohen joined Blondie in 2008 for the Parallel Lines 30th Anniversary Tour. In he explains the circumstances that led to him meeting Blondie vocalist Debbie Harry, and soon afterwards being invited to join the band on keyboards. This tour, and the subsequent Call Me Invincible Tour (2009), Endangered Species Tour (2010), Panic of Girls Tour (2011), Whip It To Shreds Tour (2012), Blast Off Tour/No Principals Tour (2013), and the Blondie 4(0) Ever Tour (2014) has seen Blondie performing at venues in Australia, Belgium, Canada, Chile, Croatia, Finland, France, Ireland, Isle of Man, Luxembourg, Mexico, Netherlands, New Zealand, Norway, Portugal, Russia, Spain, Sweden, Switzerland, United Kingdom, and the United States. A complete listing of all the venues may be found in the Blondie Gig List. In addition to performing with Blondie, he co-wrote and co-produced songs on Blondie's 2011 album Panic of Girls – "Wipe Off My Sweat" (Stein / Harry / Katz-Bohen), "Love Doesn't Frighten Me", and "What I Heard" (both of which were co-written by Matt and his wife Laurel Katz-Bohen), which spent several weeks in prime rotation on BBC Radio 2. He also produced and wrote three more songs for Blondie's 2014 release of their tenth studio album, Blondie 4(0) Ever: "A Rose by Any Name" (featuring Beth Ditto, produced by Matt and co-written by Laurel Katz-Bohen), "Take Me in the Night" (Smith / Katz-Bohen), and "Put Some Color on You" (Laurel Katz-Bohen / Matt Katz-Bohen / Debbie Harry / Lissy Trullie / Tommy Kessler). In a March 2014 interview with Blondie frontwoman Debbie Harry, she credits Katz-Bohen with making, "significant contributions" on the new album. Onstage with Blondie, he uses a Roland Fantom-G, Dave Smith Prophet 08, Roland VK8, Propellerhead Reason, and Ableton Live. In addition to these instruments, when producing, he favors the Roland Juno-106, Jupiter-6, and Minimoog Voyager.

== As a producer ==
In addition to producer credits on the latest two Blondie albums, Katz-Bohen has worked with the cast of RuPaul's Drag Race, including producing and performing in Manila Luzon's "Best XXXcessory" (#37 on the iTunes dance chart), Raja Gemini's "Zubi Zubi Zubi", Jiggly Caliente, Latrice Royale, and RuPaul. With Guy Furrow, he co-produced and performed in "Merry Effin Christmas"

== Discography ==
=== Studio albums ===
- Panic of Girls (2011)
- Blondie 4(0) Ever – Greatest Hits: Deluxe Redux / Ghosts of Download (2014)
- Pollinator (album) (2017)

=== Singles and EPs ===
All songs co-written with Laurel Katz-Bohen unless otherwise noted with an asterisk)

- Daddy – That Rose (EP) CD Baby (November 2, 2004)
- Blondie – What I Heard (single) on Panic of Girls (August 5, 2011)
- Blondie – Love Doesn't Frighten Me (single) on Panic of Girls (September 13, 2011)
- Blondie – Wipe Off My Sweat (with Chris Stein and Debbie Harry) (single) on Panic of Girls (2011)
- RuPaul - "Drag U"* Remix (with Conrad Kaneshiro and Pointy Paradise) (2012)
- Manila Luzon - "Best XXXcessory"* (2012)
- Manila Luzon - "Hot Couture (Pointy Paradise Remix)"* (2012)
- Raja - "Zubi Zubi Zubi"* (2013)
- Blondie – A Rose by Any Name (single) on Ghosts of Download (June 21, 2013)
- Pastel Confession - Pastel Confession (EP) CD Baby (July 16, 2016)
- Blondie - Too Much (single) on Pollinator (June 13, 2017)

== Film credits ==
Katz-Bohen is credited in the music department as a guitar consultant and as the soundtrack composer of the 2008 film Between Love and Goodbye. In 2016, he scored the music for the film "Dear Henri".

== Blondie personnel ==
Band

- Debbie Harry – vocals
- Chris Stein – guitars
- Clem Burke – drums
- Matt Katz-Bohen – keyboards, piano, organ, vocals
- Leigh Foxx – bass
- Tommy Kessler – guitars, vocals
