= Blondie (band) =

American rock band

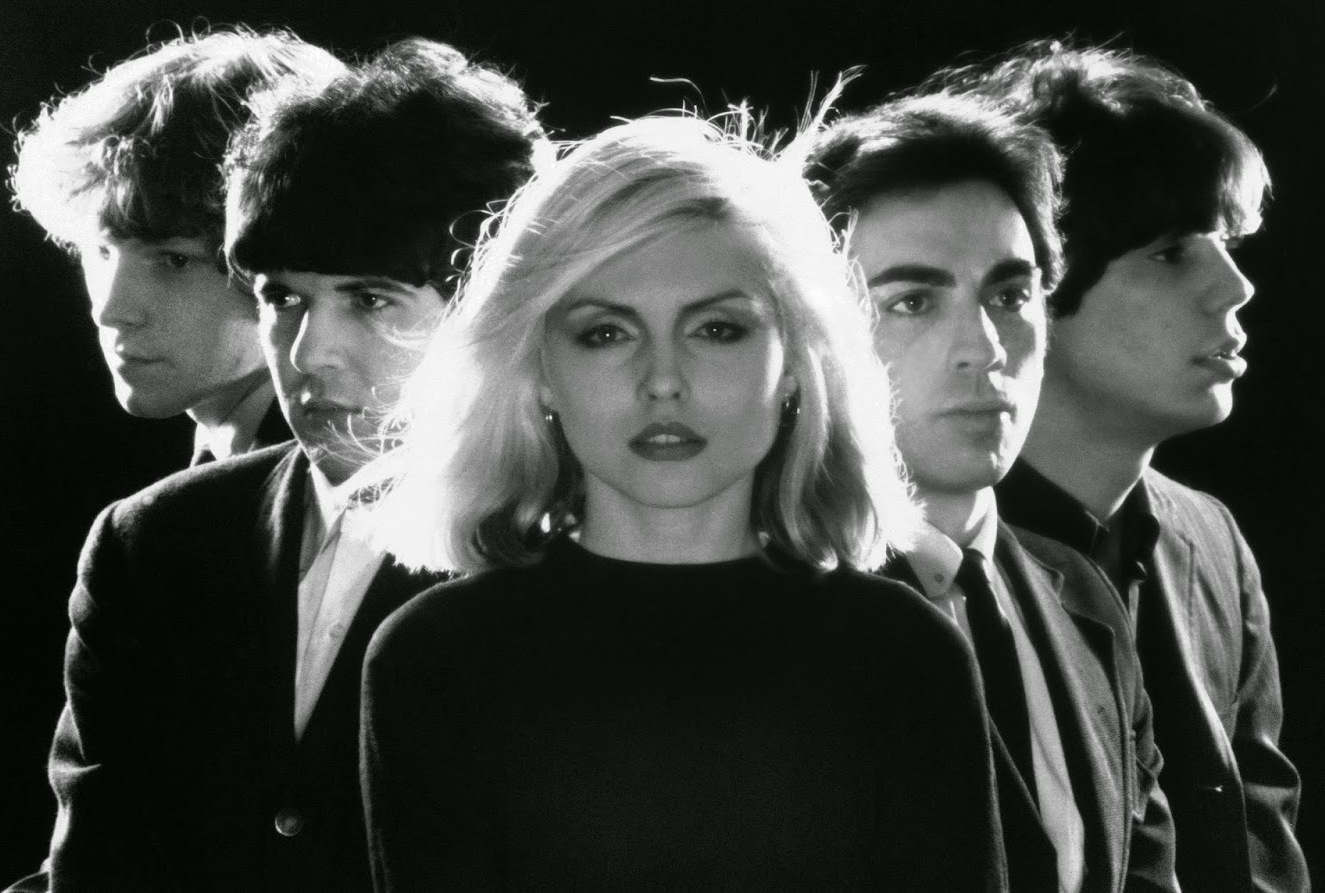
- Blondie in 1976, from left to right: Gary Valentine, Clem Burke, Debbie Harry, Chris Stein, Jimmy Destri

Background information
- Also known as: Angel and the Snake, Blondie and the Banzai Babies, Adolph's Dog
- Origin: New York City, US
- Genres: New wave; punk rock; power pop; dance-rock
- Works: Discography
- Years active: 1974–1982; 1997–present
- Labels: Private Stock; Chrysalis; EMI; Beyond; BMG; Epic; Sire; Sanctuary; Eleven Seven
- Members: Debbie Harry; Chris Stein; Leigh Foxx; Matt Katz-Bohen; Tommy Kessler
- Past members: Billy O'Connor; Fred Smith; Ivan Král; Tish Bellomo; Snooky Bellomo; Clem Burke; Gary Valentine; Jimmy Destri; Frank Infante; Nigel Harrison; Paul Carbonara
- Website: Official website

Blondie is an American rock band formed in New York City in 1974 by singer Debbie Harry and guitarist Chris Stein. Emerging as a pioneer of the early new wave genre from the CBGB punk scene of the mid-1970s, the band achieved international commercial success with their third studio album, Parallel Lines (1978), which included the global hit "Heart of Glass". Inducted into the Rock and Roll Hall of Fame in 2006, the group has sold over 40 million records worldwide.

While Blondie's self-titled debut album, Blondie (1976), found early chart success in Australia, their second album, Plastic Letters (1978), marked their commercial breakthrough in the UK. Following the international success of Parallel Lines, the band achieved global chart dominance over the next three years with the follow-up albums Eat to the Beat (1979) and Autoamerican (1980). Their hit singles from this era included "Heart of Glass" (U.S. and UK No. 1), "One Way or Another", "Dreaming", "Call Me" (from the American Gigolo soundtrack; U.S. and UK No. 1), "Atomic", "The Tide Is High" (U.S. and UK No. 1), and "Rapture" (U.S. No. 1), which became the first Billboard Hot 100 number-one single to feature rap vocals.

Blondie disbanded in late 1982 following the declining commercial performance of their sixth studio album, The Hunter (1982), compounded by internal tensions, financial difficulties, and Stein's diagnosis with pemphigus, a rare autoimmune skin disease. Harry paused her musical output to care for Stein during his recovery. The band re-formed in 1997, achieving renewed success with their seventh album, No Exit (1999), and their sixth UK number-one single, "Maria", 20 years after "Heart of Glass".

The group continued to tour internationally and released three subsequent studio albums, including Pollinator (2017), which reached number four in the UK. Following the death of longtime drummer Clem Burke in April 2025, the band announced their twelfth studio album, High Noon, scheduled for release on February 26, 2027.

== History ==
=== 1974–1978: Early career ===
Inspired by the burgeoning new music scene at the Mercer Arts Center in Manhattan, Stein sought a band with similar interests. He joined the Stilettoes in 1973 as their guitarist and formed a romantic relationship with Harry, who was one of the band's vocalists, a former waitress and Playboy Bunny. Harry had previously been a member of the late-1960s folk-rock group The Wind in the Willows. In July 1974, Stein and Harry left the Stilettoes and formed a new ensemble with ex-Stilettoes bandmates Billy O'Connor on drums (born 1953, died 2015) and Fred Smith on bass.

Originally billed as Angel and the Snake for two performances in August 1974, the group renamed themselves Blondie and the Banzai Babies, shortening it to Blondie by October 1974. Guitarist Ivan Kral subsequently joined the lineup, alongside vocalists Tish and Snooky Bellomo, who contributed occasional live backing vocals for over a year and a half. The chosen name was derived from catcalls truck drivers frequently directed at Harry while she walked down Houston Street after bleaching her hair blonde.

By early 1975, O'Connor had left the music industry, and Fred Smith replaced Richard Hell in Television, while Ivan Kral eventually joined the Patti Smith Group. Stein and Harry continued the ensemble, embarking on auditions that recruited longtime drummer Clem Burke and bassist Gary Valentine. Within weeks of this reorganization, the Bellomo sisters were let go from the group without notice.

Blondie became regular performers at Max's Kansas City and CBGB. In June 1975, the band recorded their inaugural demo, produced by Alan Betrock. To fill out their instrumentation, they recruited keyboardist Jimmy Destri in November 1975. The band eventually signed with Private Stock Records, releasing their debut single, "X-Offender", in June 1976, followed by their self-titled debut studio album, Blondie, in December 1976. Neither release achieved initial commercial success, and the band spent the remainder of the year touring as a supporting act for Television and embarking on their first promotional trip to the U.K.

In early 1977, Blondie was invited to open for David Bowie and Iggy Pop on the U.S. leg of the Idiot World Tour supporting Pop's debut solo album, The Idiot, after the pair heard and admired Blondie's debut record. In July 1977, Gary Valentine left the band to pursue solo ventures and form his own group, the Know; he was replaced on bass by Frank Infante.

In September 1977, the band bought out their contract with Private Stock and signed with the British label Chrysalis Records. The debut album was subsequently re-released on the new label in October 1977. Rolling Stone's review of the record observed the eclectic nature of the group's music, comparing its style to both Phil Spector and the Who, while noting that the album's primary strengths were Richard Gottehrer's production and the distinct persona of Harry.

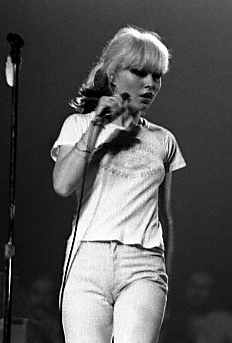
Harry performing with Blondie in Toronto, 1977

The band's first major commercial breakthrough occurred in Australia later that year, when the music television program Countdown mistakenly played the music video for "In the Flesh"—the B-side to their debut single "X-Offender". Jimmy Destri later credited the show's host, Molly Meldrum, for the band's initial Australian success, remarking that "we still thank him to this day" for broadcasting the wrong track. In a 1998 retrospective, Burke recalled watching the broadcast of the episode, though both he and Stein suggested that the song choice may have been a deliberate subterfuge by Meldrum. Stein asserted that "X-Offender" was "too crazy and aggressive" to become a mainstream hit, whereas "In the Flesh" was "not representative of any punk sensibility. Over the years, I've thought they probably played both things but liked one better. That's all." Burke subsequently described "In the Flesh" as an early "forerunner to the power ballad".

The single subsequently reached number two in Australia, and the album entered the Australian top twenty in November 1977. A subsequent double-A-side reissue of "X-Offender" and "Rip Her to Shreds" peaked at number 81 on the national chart. A successful Australian concert tour followed in December 1977, though it was marred by an incident on December 8 at Her Majesty's Theatre in Brisbane, where disappointed fans nearly rioted after Harry cancelled the performance due to illness; the concert was later rescheduled and performed on December 18.

In February 1978, Blondie released their second studio album, Plastic Letters (U.K. number 10, U.S. number 78, Australia number 64). The album was recorded in mid-1977, with the group officially operating as a quartet following Gary Valentine's departure on July 4, 1977. Frank Infante was brought in as a session musician to play bass on the sessions and is credited on all issues of the record with bass and rhythm guitar; Stein is credited with lead guitar, bass, E-bow, and vibes. Plastic Letters was promoted extensively throughout Europe and Asia by Chrysalis Records.

The album's lead single, "Denis", was a cover version of Randy and the Rainbows' 1963 hit "Denise". It reached number two on the U.K. Singles Chart, while both the album and its second single, "(I'm Always Touched by Your) Presence, Dear" (written by Valentine), reached the British top ten. This chart success, along with a highly successful U.K. tour that included a landmark performance at London's Roundhouse on March 5, 1978, made Blondie one of the first American new wave bands to achieve mainstream commercial crossover in the U.K. After the album's release, Infante was integrated as an official band member and switched to guitar, while British musician Nigel Harrison was hired as the group's full-time bassist. This expanded Blondie into a six-piece for the first time, marking a long-term stabilization in the band's lineup.

=== 1978–1981: Mainstream success ===
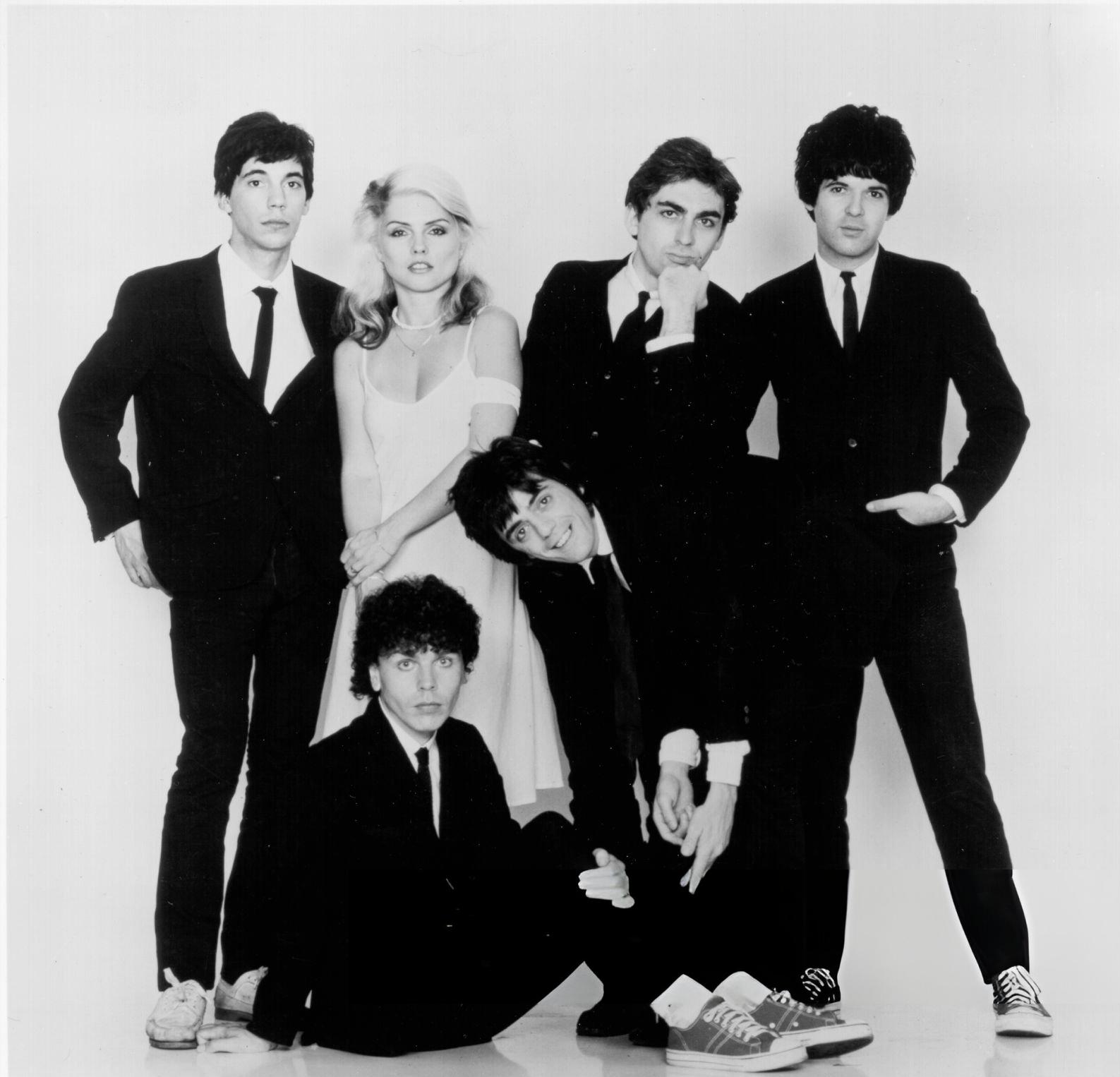
Blondie in a publicity photograph, 1978

Blondie completed the recording of their third studio album, Parallel Lines, in mid-1978 with Australian producer Mike Chapman. Released in September of that year, the record reached number one in the U.K, number six in the US, and number two in Australia. It finally broke the band into the mainstream American market on the strength of the worldwide hit single "Heart of Glass". Parallel Lines became the group's most commercially successful album, eventually selling 20 million copies worldwide. The album's first two European singles were "Picture This" (U.K. number 12) and "Hanging on the Telephone" (U.K. number five). Because the band had previously found success with a cover track, Chrysalis Records selected their version of Buddy Holly's "I'm Gonna Love You Too" as the lead single from Parallel Lines in the US. This strategy proved to be a miscalculation, as the single failed to chart.

"Heart of Glass" was released as a single in early 1979. The disco-infused track topped the U.K. Singles Chart in February 1979, and reached number one on the U.S. Billboard Hot 100 in April 1979. The song was a complete reworking of a rock and reggae-influenced track originally titled "Once I Had a Love" (or "The Disco Song"), which the group had performed since its formation in the mid-1970s before updating it with prominent elements of disco music. Burke later noted that the revamped arrangement was inspired partly by Kraftwerk and partly by the Bee Gees' "Stayin' Alive", whose driving drum beat Burke attempted to emulate. Both he and Stein gave Destri substantial credit for the final composition, remarking that Destri's appreciation for emerging studio technology had prompted him to introduce synthesizers and completely reformat the keyboard layers.

Although some contemporary music critics condemned Blondie for "selling out" by incorporating dance-pop aesthetics, the single became a massive international success and one of the highest-selling records of 1979. As the visual and stylistic focal point of the group, Harry began to attain a level of mainstream celebrity status that increasingly set her apart from her bandmates. During this period, she also embarked on an acting career, appearing in the independent feature film The Foreigner (1978), directed by Amos Poe.

Blondie's follow-up single in the U.S. was the more aggressive rock song "One Way or Another" (U.S. number 24), while in the U.K, an alternate single selection, "Sunday Girl", became a number-one hit. Parallel Lines has since been ranked at number 140 on Rolling Stone's list of the 500 Greatest Albums of All Time. A major cover feature on the band photographed by Annie Leibovitz subsequently appeared in Rolling Stone magazine in June 1979. The group returned to the studio with producer Mike Chapman to begin tracking their follow-up album in the summer of 1979.

Blondie's fourth studio album, Eat to the Beat (U.K. number one, U.S. number seventeen, Australia number nine), also produced by Chapman, was released in September 1979. Although well received by critics as a suitable follow-up to Parallel Lines, the album and its accompanying singles failed to achieve the same level of commercial success in the US. In the U.K, the album delivered three top 20 hits, including the band's third U.K. number-one single, "Atomic" (U.S. number thirty-nine). The album's lead track, "Dreaming", reached number two in the U.K, but only peaked at number 27 in the US.

The second single, "Union City Blue" (UK number 13), shared its title with the independent neo-noir film Union City (1980) starring Harry and directed by Mark Reichert. Along with inspiration from the film project, the lyrics for "Union City Blue" derived from Harry's previous experience living in Union City, New Jersey, where she worked various jobs across the Hudson River from Manhattan and noted the scenic skyline before the formation of Blondie. The single was withheld from a U.S. release in favor of the track "The Hardest Part".

Chrysalis Records' Linda Carhart commissioned the U.S. division of Jon Roseman Productions to shoot promotional videos for every song on the track listing, creating the first-ever commercial video album. David Mallet directed and Paul Flattery produced the project at various studio and street locations in and around New York. It subsequently received a nomination for Video of the Year at the 24th Annual Grammy Awards in 1982, marking the first year the Recording Academy instituted a category for music videos. At the end of the year, the band's special New Year's Eve performance at the Apollo Theatre in Glasgow was broadcast live by the BBC on The Old Grey Whistle Test. In March 1980, "Atomic" hit number one in the U.K., and the parent album was certified gold the following month.

Blondie's next single, the Grammy-nominated "Call Me", was the result of Harry's collaboration with Italian songwriter and producer Giorgio Moroder, who had been responsible for many of Donna Summer's biggest hits. The track was recorded as the title theme for the Richard Gere film American Gigolo (1980). Released in the U.S. in February 1980, "Call Me" spent six consecutive weeks at number one on the Billboard Hot 100 and topped the charts in Canada. Following its U.K. release in April 1980, it also reached number one, establishing itself as a major global hit. The single was subsequently named the number-one song on Billboard magazine's 1980 year-end chart.

In the summer of 1980, the band appeared in a cameo role in the musical comedy film Roadie starring Meat Loaf. Blondie performed a cover of the Johnny Cash song "Ring of Fire" for the project; this live recording was featured on the film's soundtrack album and later included as a bonus track on a CD reissue of Eat to the Beat.

In November 1980, Blondie released their fifth studio album and third collaboration with Chapman, Autoamerican (UK number three, U.S. number seven, Australia number eight). Autoamerican produced two more U.S. number-one singles: the reggae-styled "The Tide Is High", a cover version of a 1967 song written by John Holt of the Paragons, and the rap-flavored "Rapture", which made history as the first song featuring rapping to reach number one in the US In the song's lyrics, Harry namechecks hip-hop and graffiti pioneer Fab Five Freddy, who also made a cameo appearance in the accompanying music video. Autoamerican displayed a far wider stylistic variance than previous Blondie records, incorporating the avant-garde instrumental "Europa", the acoustic jazz arrangement "Faces", and a rendition of "Follow Me" from the Broadway musical Camelot. The album achieved platinum certifications in both the U.S. and the U.K.

Blondie took a hiatus for most of 1981. Harry appeared on Saturday Night Live in February 1981, serving as both the guest host and musical guest, with Stein and Burke backing her during her live musical performances. During this gap in the band's schedule, Harry and Destri both released solo studio albums. Stein collaborated on Harry's solo debut KooKoo (UK number six, U.S. number twenty-eight), which was produced by Nile Rodgers and Bernard Edwards. Harry, Stein, and Destri also collaborated on the score for John Waters' film Polyester (1981).

Stein and Burke also contributed to Destri's solo album, Heart on a Wall (1981); the record's liner notes credit Burke with drums, while Stein contributed harmonica and lead guitar to the track "Little Metal Drummer" (co-written with Destri), and both Harry and Stein provided backing vocals across the album. Additionally, Burke played drums on Eurythmics' debut studio album, In the Garden. Harry, Stein, and Destri subsequently worked together composing music for the 1981 John Waters satirical film Polyester. In October 1981, Chrysalis Records issued The Best of Blondie (UK number four, U.S. number thirty, Australia number one), which marked the group's first official greatest hits compilation.

=== 1982: The Hunter and breakup ===
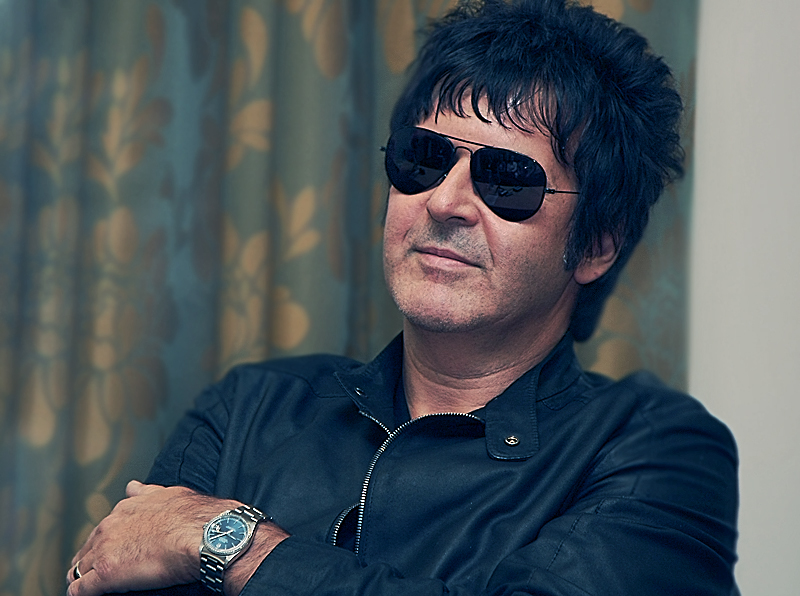
Clem Burke joined Blondie in 1975 and played on all of the band's studio albums.

The band reconvened in December 1981 to record their sixth studio album, The Hunter, which was released in May 1982 (UK number nine, U.S. number 33, Australia number 15). Frank Infante was initially excluded from the recording sessions due to escalating friction with other group members, prompting him to initiate legal proceedings that resulted in his reinstatement following an out-of-court settlement. Although Infante's name appears in the credits of The Hunter and he is pictured on the sleeve, Harry later stated that his actual contributions to the finished record were minimal.

While The Hunter reached the top 10 in the UK, its commercial and critical reception fell short of the band's preceding three albums. Contemporary reviews were largely unfavorable; Rolling Stone described its loose conceptual themes as strained, while AllMusic later characterized it as a disjointed, obligatory release that lacked the cohesive pop songwriting of Parallel Lines. The album produced two singles: "Island of Lost Souls" (UK number 11, U.S. number 37, Australia number 13) and "War Child" (UK number 39). It also included "For Your Eyes Only", a track originally commissioned for the 1981 James Bond film of the same name before producers rejected it in favor of Sheena Easton's recording.

For a brief North American promotional tour in July and August 1982, Infante was replaced by session guitarist Eddie Martinez. However, a planned UK and European tour leg was cancelled due to stagnant ticket sales. In November 1982, the band publicly announced their dissolution, citing internal friction, declining album sales, the cancelled European tour, and Stein's diagnosis with pemphigus, a rare, life-threatening autoimmune skin disease. Harry subsequently paused her musical output to care for Stein during his recovery; although the pair ended their 13-year romantic relationship in February 1987, they remained close friends and continued to collaborate musically.

A remix album titled Once More into the Bleach was released in 1988, featuring contemporary remixes of classic Blondie tracks alongside material from Harry's solo career, including "Denis". Harry continued to release solo studio albums, including Def, Dumb and Blonde (1989) and Debravation (1993), while maintaining an active international touring schedule. Chrysalis also issued further retrospectives, with the compilation The Complete Picture: The Very Best of Deborah Harry and Blondie reaching number three on the U.K. Albums Chart in 1991. In 1993, the rarities collection Blond and Beyond was issued, followed a year later by the U.S. release of The Platinum Collection. The group's catalog continued to be expanded with a second remix project, Beautiful: The Remix Album (1995), and the live retrospective Picture This Live (1997).

During the 1990s, Blondie's past catalog began to be recognized by a new generation of fans and alternative rock artists, including Garbage and No Doubt. Concurrently, Chrysalis and EMI Records issued several compilations and multi-track remix collections celebrating their classic hits.

Harry had continued her solo career after the band's initial breakup, releasing studio records in 1989 and 1993 that helped keep the group's legacy in the public eye. In the summer of 1990, she reunited with Stein and Burke for a multi-city package tour titled "Escape from New York", appearing alongside Jerry Harrison, the Tom Tom Club, and the Ramones.

=== 1997–2007: Re-formation, No Exit and The Curse of Blondie ===
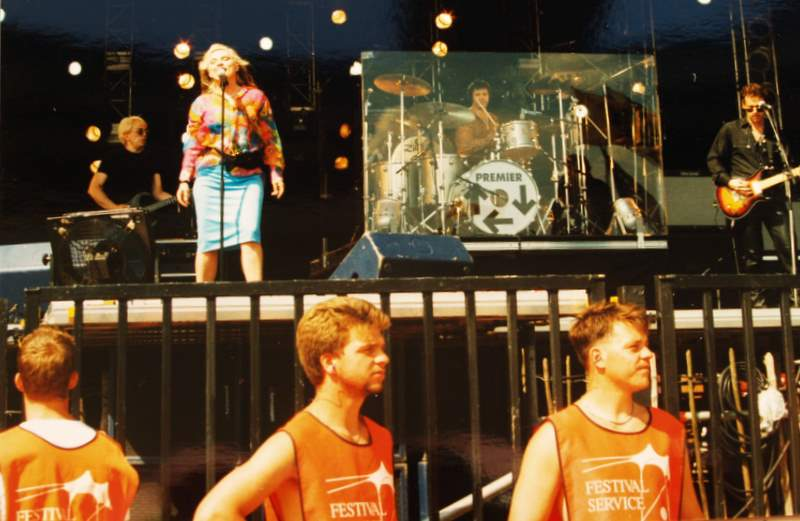
Blondie performing at the Roskilde Festival in 1999

In 1996, Stein and Harry initiated the process of formally reuniting Blondie, contacting original members Burke, Destri, and Gary Valentine. By this time, Valentine had relocated to London and established himself as a full-time author under his birth name, Gary Lachman; he later detailed his tenure with the group in his 2002 memoir, New York Rocker: My Life in the Blank Generation. Reportedly, longtime bassist Nigel Harrison, who had originally replaced Valentine in the late 1970s, was initially considered for the reunion lineup and even tracked bass on early studio demos with the band. Ultimately, however, neither he nor guitarist Frank Infante participated in the official reunion. The two subsequently filed an unsuccessful lawsuit against the founding members seeking to block them from touring or recording under the name Blondie.

In 1997, the original five-piece lineup re-formed—including Gary Valentine on bass—and made three live promotional appearances, all at outdoor festivals sponsored by local radio stations. Their inaugural reunion performance occurred on May 31, 1997, when they played the HFStival at R.F.K. Stadium in Washington, D.C. An international tour followed across Europe and Australasia in late 1998 and early 1999. During this period, operating without Valentine, the group tracked a cover of Iggy Pop's "Ordinary Bummer" for the tribute compilation album We Will Fall: The Iggy Pop Tribute (1997) under the pseudonym "Adolph's Dog".

A new studio album, No Exit (UK number three, U.S. number eighteen), was released in February 1999. The band was now officially a four-piece consisting of core original members Harry, Stein, Burke, and Destri. By this point, Valentine had departed the group and did not perform on the album or contribute to the songwriting; two tracks on the album co-authored by a "Valentine" were actually co-written by Kathy Valentine of the Go-Go's, who is no relation to Gary. Session musicians Leigh Foxx (bass) and Paul Carbonara (guitar) contributed to the tracking sessions and joined subsequent Blondie releases.

No Exit reached number three on the U.K. Albums Chart, and the lead single, "Maria", which Destri had composed while reflecting on his youth in Catholic school, became Blondie's sixth U.K. number-one single twenty years after their first chart-topper, "Heart of Glass". This achievement gave the band the distinction of being one of only two American acts to score number-one hits on the U.K. Singles Chart across the 1970s, 1980s, and 1990s (the other being Michael Jackson, who achieved number-one singles both solo and with The Jacksons across those same decades).

The re-formed group released their follow-up studio album, The Curse of Blondie (UK number 36, U.S. number 160), in October 2003. The Curse of Blondie proved to be the band's lowest-charting album since their 1976 debut, although its lead single, "Good Boys", managed to reach number 12 on the U.K. charts.

In 2004, Jimmy Destri departed the group to undergo treatment for drug addiction, leaving Harry, Stein, and Burke as the only remaining members of the original lineup. Though Destri's rehab program was successful, he was not invited back into the touring ensemble. While he initially intended to collaborate on their 2011 album Panic of Girls, he ultimately did not contribute as a songwriter or musician to the finished product, nor to any subsequent Blondie project.

In 2005, a new CD/DVD compilation titled Greatest Hits: Sight + Sound was issued, peaking at number 48 in the U.K.

Blondie co-headlined the Road Rage Tour alongside the New Cars in 2006, releasing a studio cover of the Roxy Music hit "More than This" to promote the joint tour dates.

Following the release of The Curse of Blondie, keyboardist Jimmy Destri stepped back from touring in 2004 to enter rehabilitation and spend time with his family, leaving Harry, Stein, and Burke as the sole active members from the band's 1970s lineup. Throughout the mid-to-late 2000s, Blondie's touring and recording lineup was anchored by longtime session and live musicians Leigh Foxx on bass and Paul Carbonara on guitar—both of whom had performed with the group since its 1997 reformation—alongside touring keyboardist Kevin Patrick (2004–2007) and later Matt Katz-Bohen, who took over keyboards in 2008. Foxx, Carbonara, and Katz-Bohen were subsequently elevated to official full-time band membership in 2009.

=== 2008–2012: Parallel Lines 30th Anniversary Tour and Panic of Girls ===
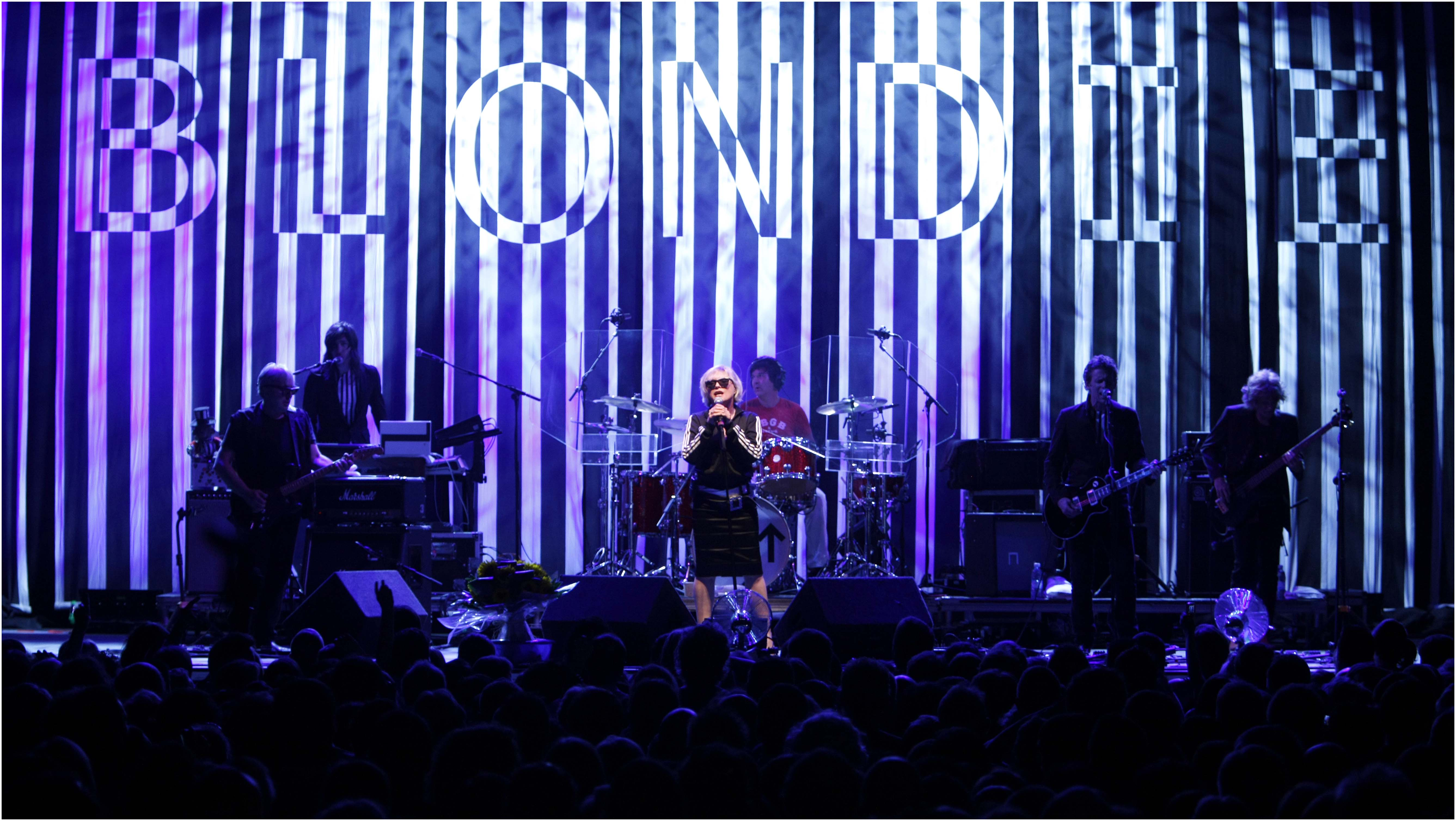
Blondie performing in Galway, Ireland, during their Parallel Lines 30th Anniversary Tour in 2008

On June 5, 2008, Blondie launched a world tour for the 30th anniversary of Parallel Lines in Baltimore, Maryland, hitting U.S. cities before touring the U.K., Europe, and Israel through August. Buoyed by the tour's reception, Burke and Carbonara announced plans for the band's first studio album since 2003's The Curse of Blondie. Following a mid-2009 North American tour with Pat Benatar and the Donnas, Blondie recorded their ninth studio album in Woodstock, New York, with producer Jeff Saltzman. Longtime contributors Leigh Foxx, Carbonara, and keyboardist Matt Katz-Bohen were elevated to official full-time membership, and in December 2009, the group issued a Christmas rendition of "We Three Kings" as the album neared completion.

Stein tapped visual artist Chris Berens to create the cover art for the record, titled Panic of Girls. Carbonara departed amicably in April 2010 and was replaced by Tommy Kessler, though both were credited on the album. The band then toured globally on the "Endangered Species Tour" through 2010, visiting the U.K., North America, Australia, and New Zealand (co-headlining with the Pretenders). Originally delayed after Sony Music withdrew from an Australian release plan, Panic of Girls was independently released in mid-2011, starting with a U.K. "fan pack" in May. The lead single "Mother" debuted as a free download accompanied by a Laurent Rejto-directed video, and a second single, "What I Heard", followed digitally in July 2011.

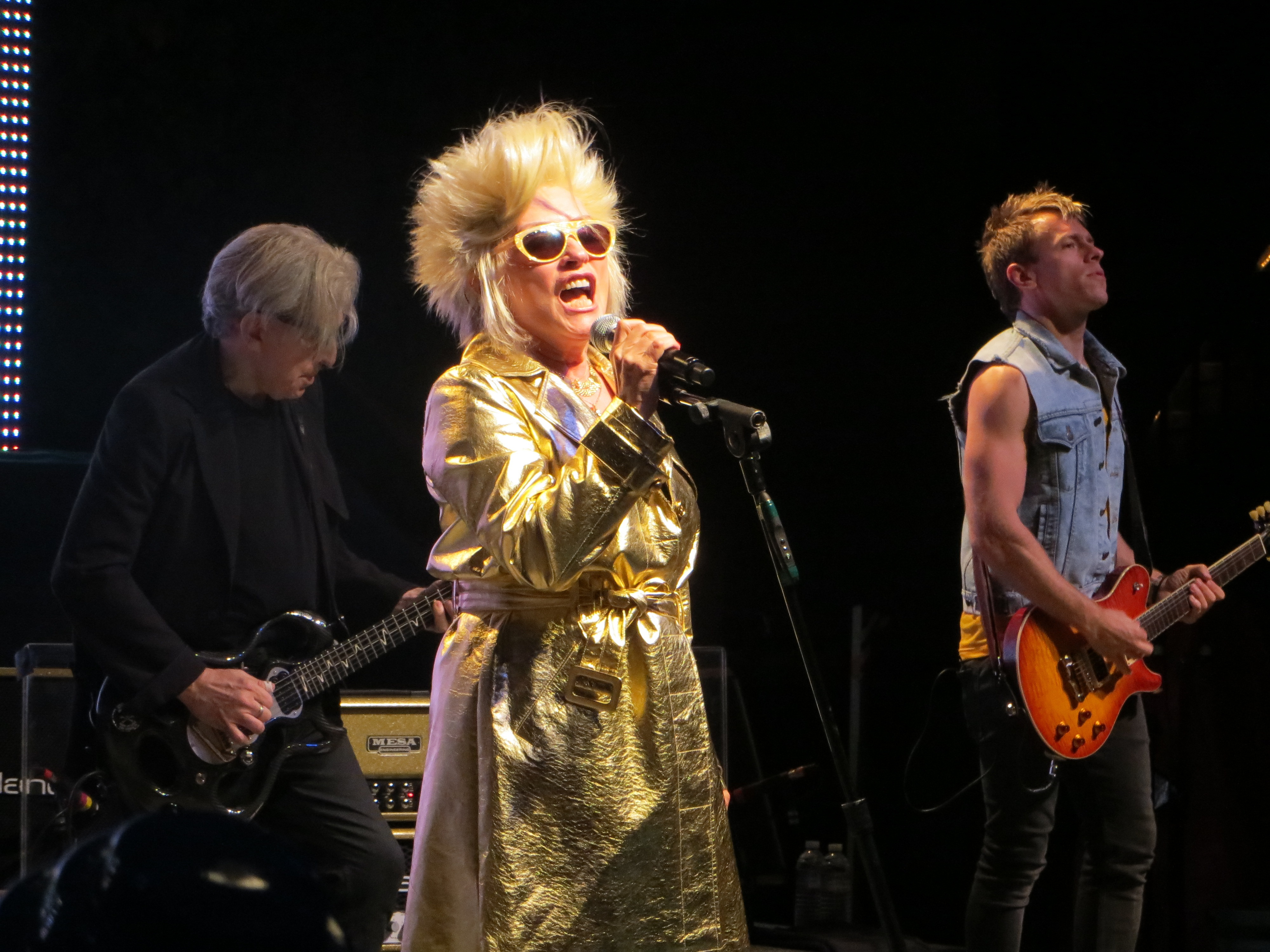
Blondie performing at the Mountain Winery in Saratoga, California in 2012

On August 20, 2011, Blondie performed a live set for "Guitar Center Sessions" on DirecTV. The episode included a comprehensive interview with program host Nic Harcourt. The band continued to tour regularly into 2012, culminating in a concert in New York City that was streamed live on YouTube on October 11, 2012. That same week, the group distributed three previously unreleased songs tracked during the Panic of Girls sessions—"Bride of Infinity", "Rock On", and "Dead Air"—on Amazon.com, where they were made available for free download in the US, and in the U.K. via the band's official website. Another outtake, "Practice Makes Perfect", was also released as a free digital download in November 2012.

=== 2013–2023: Ghosts of Download and Pollinator ===
On March 20, 2013, Harry and Stein were interviewed on the radio show WNYC Soundcheck, where they confirmed they were working on a new Blondie album and previewed a track titled "Make a Way". In June and July 2013, the band embarked on their "Blast Off Tour" across Europe. The U.S. "No Principals Tour" followed in September and October 2013.

The first single from the album project, "A Rose by Any Name", was released digitally in Europe on June 24, 2013. A second single, "Sugar on the Side", was subsequently made available as a digital release in the U.S. in December 2013.

The album Ghosts of Download was released in May 2014 as part of a two-disc package titled Blondie 4(0) Ever to coincide with the band's 40th anniversary. Produced by Jeff Saltzman, the record incorporated contemporary electronic and Latin dance styles alongside collaborations with Beth Ditto, Los Rakas, and Systema Solar, while the companion disc, Greatest Hits Deluxe Redux, compiled newly recorded studio versions of Blondie's past singles. The band's official worldwide 40th anniversary tour commenced in February 2014.

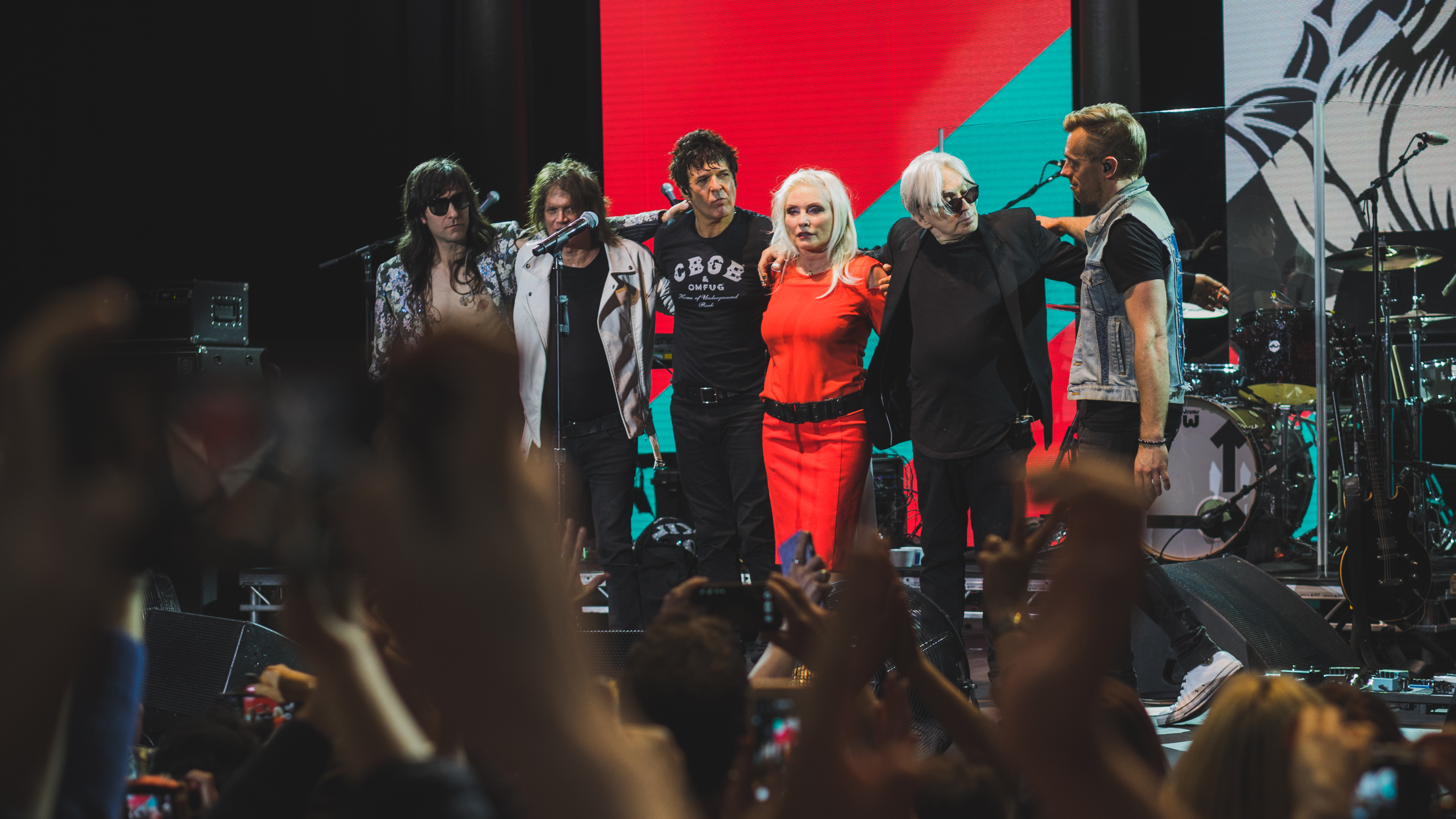
Blondie performing at the Roundhouse in London in 2017

Blondie recorded a live concert special for PBS's Soundstage to be broadcast in 2016, showcasing two new tracks, "My Monster" and "Gravity". In 2015, core band members Harry and Stein made a guest appearance alongside the Gregory Brothers in an episode of the YouTube series Songify the News, collaborating with the group again in 2016 to parody the 2016 US presidential election debates.

In January 2017, it was announced that the band would support Phil Collins at Dublin's Aviva Stadium on June 25, 2017, as part of his Not Dead Yet Tour. The group also toured Australia and New Zealand on a joint co-headlining itinerary alongside Cyndi Lauper.

In the March 2017 issue of Mojo magazine, the band announced that their eleventh studio album, Pollinator, would be released on May 5, 2017. The album was tracked at The Magic Shop studio in SoHo, New York City, and featured songs composed by external contributors including TV on the Radio's Dave Sitek, Johnny Marr, Sia, Charli XCX, and Dev Hynes. Pollinator spawned the singles "Fun" and "Long Time", launching the group on an extensive promotional tour across North, Central, and South America and Europe. The album peaked at number four on the U.K. Albums Chart, becoming Blondie's highest-charting studio album since 1999's No Exit.

On December 21, 2019, Blondie announced the upcoming release of a companion EP and short documentary film titled Vivir en La Habana. Documenting the band's cultural exchange performances in Havana, Cuba, in March 2019, the film was directed by Rob Roth and screened at international film festivals, including the Sheffield DocFest and Tribeca Festival. Because Stein did not travel to Cuba for the residency due to health concerns, he subsequently overdubbed studio guitar tracks onto the live recordings for the six-song EP, which was released in July 2021. In October 2020, Harry and Stein collaborated with the Gregory Brothers on a musical satire of the 2020 U.S. vice presidential debate titled "One Heartbeat Away", portraying mock debate moderators.

In October 2020, Blondie announced a ten-date U.K. "Against the Odds Tour" with Garbage for November 2021, which was later postponed to April 2022 due to the COVID-19 pandemic. Former Smiths guitarist Johnny Marr—who wrote "My Monster" for Blondie's 2017 album *Pollinator*—joined the rescheduled U.S. and U.K. dates, around the time Harry praised Miley Cyrus's cover of "Heart of Glass".

In April 2022, Stein withdrew from the tour due to atrial fibrillation and fatigue, replaced on guitar by Andee Blacksugar. With longtime bassist Leigh Foxx sidelined by a back injury, former Sex Pistols bassist Glen Matlock stepped in for live dates and subsequent studio recordings. In April 2023, this lineup performed at Coachella alongside Nile Rodgers.

=== 2024–present: Upcoming twelfth studio album, High Noon ===
In a June 2024 interview for BBC Radio 6 Music, Harry and Stein stated that Blondie's upcoming twelfth studio album would be released in early 2025. This was followed on November 6, 2024, by images posted to Stein's and Blondie's official social media accounts showing Harry in the recording studio, captioned "Whatever. Blondie album next year. Alea iacta est."

Exactly fifty years after first joining Blondie, Burke died of cancer on April 6, 2025. On August 19, 2025, the band revealed that their new studio album, High Noon, would be released in early 2026 and would feature drum tracks recorded by Burke prior to his death. Although the release was pushed back, the album was teased on the band's official social media pages on October 9, 2026.

Following the debut of the lead single, "Spectral Eyes", on BBC Radio 2 on October 15, 2026, the album's official release date was set for February 26, 2027 via BMG. The 13-track record, produced by John Congleton and featuring artwork by Rob Roth, incorporates contributions from artists including Johnny Marr and Glen Matlock, alongside Burke's final recordings and a rework of Jimmy Destri's "Little Metal Drummer".

== Artistry ==
Blondie performing at the O2 Brixton Academy in 2017

By 1982, the year the band initially disbanded, Blondie had released six studio albums, each exhibiting a distinct stylistic progression from the last. The band became renowned not only for the striking stage persona and vocal performances of Harry, but for reaching extensively from their punk roots to embrace new wave, power pop, and dance-rock. Their multi-genre sound integrated prominent elements of disco, pop, rap, and reggae.

The foundational ethos of Blondie's songwriting was heavily informed by 1960s girl groups, Phil Spector's Wall of Sound production techniques, and the melodic structures of the British Invasion, which the band paired with an aggressive punk rock delivery. Rather than adhering to a single genre convention, the group used the mid-1970s Manhattan underground scene at CBGB as an experimental workshop, a movement Burke later characterized as a collective "CBGB sound" unified by club owner Hilly Kristal's requirement that performers play original material rather than cover songs. Within the band, songwriting was primarily anchored by the partnership of Stein and Harry—who combined cinematic, ironic lyrics with surf-inflected guitar hooks—alongside keyboardist Destri, whose use of Farfisa organs and early synthesizers helped bridge their garage-rock roots with electronic dance and pop arrangements.

== Legacy ==
Blondie is one of the most commercially successful female-fronted new-wave bands, selling over 40 million records worldwide. Blondie's massive commercial success and ability to generate unprecedented pure sales numbers for an underground band altered the landscape of the music business, proving that "aggressive, street-level styles could be successfully translated into international stadium-filling records without sacrificing their foundational values." Ann Powers, a writer for The New York Times, stated that "the modernized girl-group style Blondie perfected became a structural blueprint for generations of subsequent female-fronted bands."

By intentionally challenging genre siloes, the band executed a pioneer cultural impact on the development of the new wave movement. Their fearless incorporation of urban subcultures culminated in their milestone 1980 track "Rapture", which made music history by introducing the broader public to the emerging Bronx hip-hop scene and mainstreaming multi-genre musical formatting. By bridging the gap between raw street grit and pop structures, they established a blueprint for the dance-punk and synth-pop movement that dominated subsequent decades.

Blondie's stylistic architecture, independent ethos, and visual style left an enduring imprint on many subsequent performers, including Madonna, Cyndi Lauper, No Doubt, Paramore, Lady Gaga, the Strokes, the Go-Go's, Carly Rae Jepsen, Duran Duran, Katy Perry, the B-52's, Sky Ferreira, the Cardigans, Cults, Garbage, Miley Cyrus, Billie Eilish, St. Vincent, and Charli XCX.

In March 2006, Blondie was inducted into the Rock and Roll Hall of Fame, preceded by an introductory induction speech delivered by Shirley Manson of Garbage. Seven members of the band's historical lineups (Harry, Stein, Burke, Destri, Infante, Nigel Harrison, and Valentine) were invited to the ceremony. The event resulted in an on-stage dispute during the live broadcast when former guitarist Frank Infante requested that he and Nigel Harrison be permitted to perform with the touring lineup; the request was declined by Harry, who stated that the performing ensemble had already completed their rehearsals. On May 22, 2006, Blondie was further honored with an induction into the Rock Walk of Fame at Guitar Center on Hollywood's Sunset Boulevard.

== Band members ==
Current

- Debbie Harry – lead vocals (1974–1982, 1997–present)
- Chris Stein – guitar, bass (1974–1982, 1997–present; not touring since 2019)
- Leigh Foxx – bass (2009–present; touring: 1997–2009; not touring since 2022)
- Matt Katz-Bohen – keyboards, backing vocals, guitar (2009–present; touring 2004–2009)
- Tommy Kessler – guitar, backing vocals (2010–present)

Touring

- Jimi K Bones – guitar (2003)
- Kevin Patrick – keyboards, backing vocals (2003–2007)
- Andee Blacksugar – guitar, backing vocals (2021–present)
- Glen Matlock – bass (2022–present)

Former

- Fred Smith – bass (1974–1975; died 2026)
- Billy O'Connor – drums (1974–1975; died 2015)
- Tish Bellomo – backing vocals (1974–1975)
- Snooky Bellomo – backing vocals (1974–1975)
- Ivan Kral – guitar (1974; died 2020)
- Clem Burke – drums, percussion (1975–1982, 1997–2025; his death)
- Gary Valentine – bass, guitar (1975–1977, 1997)
- Jimmy Destri – keyboards, backing vocals (1975–1982, 1997–2004)
- Frank Infante – guitar, backing vocals (1977–1982), bass (1977–1978)
- Nigel Harrison – bass (1978–1982, 1997)
- Paul Carbonara – guitar, backing vocals (2009–2010; touring 1997–2009)

== Discography ==
Studio albums

- Blondie (1976)
- Plastic Letters (1978)
- Parallel Lines (1978)
- Eat to the Beat (1979)
- Autoamerican (1980)
- The Hunter (1982)
- No Exit (1999)
- The Curse of Blondie (2003)
- Panic of Girls (2011)
- Ghosts of Download (2014)
- Pollinator (2017)
- High Noon (2027)

== Tours ==
=== Headlining (main tours) ===
- Plastic Letters Tour (1978)
- Parallel Lines Tour (1979–1980)
- Tracks Across America Tour '82 (1982)
- No Exit Tour (1998–1999)
- Camp Funtime Summer Tour (2002)
- Phasm 8 Tour (2003–2005)
- Parallel Lines 30th Anniversary Tour (2008)
- Endangered Species Tour (2010)
- Panic of Girls Tour (2011)
- Blast Off/No Principals Tour (2013)
- Pollinator Tour (2017–2019)
- Against the Odds Tour (2022)
- Ball of Confusion Tour (2024)

=== Co-headlining ===
- Road Rage Tour with The New Cars (2006)
- Call Me Invincible Tour with Pat Benatar (2009)
- Endangered Species Tour with The Pretenders and Cheap Trick (2010)
- Whip It To Shreds Tour with Devo (2012)
- No Principals Tour with X (2013)
- Rage and Rapture Tour with Garbage (2017)
- Elvis Costello & The Imposters and Blondie Co-Headlining 2019 Tour with Elvis Costello & The Imposters (2019)
- Pandemonium 2024 with Alice Cooper (2024)

== Awards and nominations ==
List of awards and nominations received by Blondie
| Award / Organization | Year | Category | Nominee / Work | Result | Ref. |
|---|---|---|---|---|---|
| BBC | 2022 | Longshots Audience Award | Blondie: Vivir en la Habana | Won | |
| Brit Awards | 1980 | International Group | Blondie | Nominated | |
| Grammy Awards | 1981 | Best Rock Performance by a Duo or Group with Vocal | "Call Me" | Nominated | |
| Grammy Awards | 1982 | Video of the Year | Eat to the Beat | Nominated | |
| Grammy Awards | 2023 | Best Historical Album | Against the Odds: 1974–1982 | Nominated | |
| Grammy Hall of Fame | 2016 | Grammy Hall of Fame | "Heart of Glass" | Inductee | |
| Hollywood's RockWalk | 2006 | Hollywood's RockWalk | Blondie | Inductee | |
| Juno Awards | 1980 | Best Selling Single | "Heart of Glass" | Won | |
| Juno Awards | 1982 | International Single of the Year | "The Tide Is High" | Nominated | |
| NME Awards | 2014 | Godlike Genius Award | Blondie | Won | |
| Q Awards | 1998 | Q Inspiration Award | Blondie | Won | |
| Q Awards | 2016 | Q Outstanding Contribution to Music | Blondie | Won | |
| Rock and Roll Hall of Fame | 2006 | Performer | Blondie | Inductee | |
| Songwriters Hall of Fame | 2023 | Performing Songwriters | Clem Burke, Debbie Harry, and Chris Stein | Nominated | |
| Songwriters Hall of Fame | 2024 | Performing Songwriters | Debbie Harry and Chris Stein | Nominated | |

== See also ==
- List of best-selling albums
- List of artists by number of UK Singles Chart number ones
- List of million-selling singles in the UK
