= Tommy Kessler =

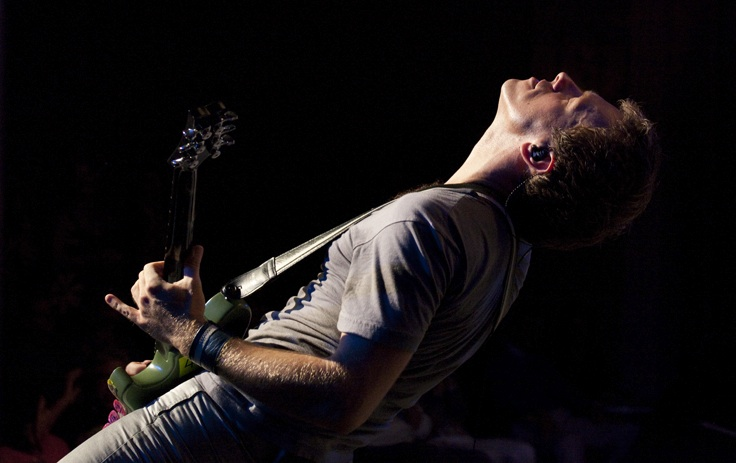
- Kessler performing with Blondie during their 2010 Endangered Species World Tour

Background information
- Genres: New wave, rock, pop
- Occupations: Musician, producer, songwriter
- Instruments: Guitar, mandolin
- Years active: 2003–present
- Member of: Blondie (2010–present)
- Website: tommykessler.com

Tommy Kessler is an American guitarist from Springboro, Ohio, currently in the new wave band Blondie.

== Biography ==
Kessler joined Blondie in April 2010, replacing guitarist Paul Carbonara who had left Blondie during the sessions for their ninth studio album, Panic of Girls, to pursue other projects. Despite playing on only two songs Kessler was credited as a full-time member in the liner notes.

He was trained in classical and Latin guitar. These styles provided a great understanding of music theory and also taught him to read standard notation. Later, Tommy drifted into the direction of the hard rock masters such as Randy Rhoads, Slash, Steve Vai, Eddie Van Halen and Dimebag Darrell. His natural talent of learning pieces very quickly by sight reading or memorizing by ear helped him quickly excel in that scene. Kessler's first steady gig in New York City was playing in the word-renowned Blue Man Group where he played zither, guitar, bass and Chapman stick. He has also been part of the band in the New York City version of Blue Man Group since 2006.

Kessler also performs as a guitarist in the fictional 1980s rock band Arsenal in the Broadway musical, Rock of Ages, a member since it opened off Broadway in 2008. His abilities have resulted in a reputation for excellence that has led to him becoming a highly sought after session guitarist in New York City since moving there in 2005.

Being in Rock of Ages led to him meeting Blondie. He was recommended by the band's keyboardist Matt Katz-Bohen.

In 2015, Kessler was asked to be a part of the Fresh Kids of Bel-Air. He performs regularly at (Le) Poisson Rouge.

Kessler served as musical director for the 2011 Glamour Women of the Year Awards. He has written and produced music for The Nickelodeon Network (iCarly and Victorious).

Kessler mixed Joel Hoekstra's Joel Hoekstra's 13: Dying to Live.

Since 2013 he has often worn on stage with Blondie a denim jacket made for him by British artist Ian Berry who is known for his art in denim.
