= Systema Solar =

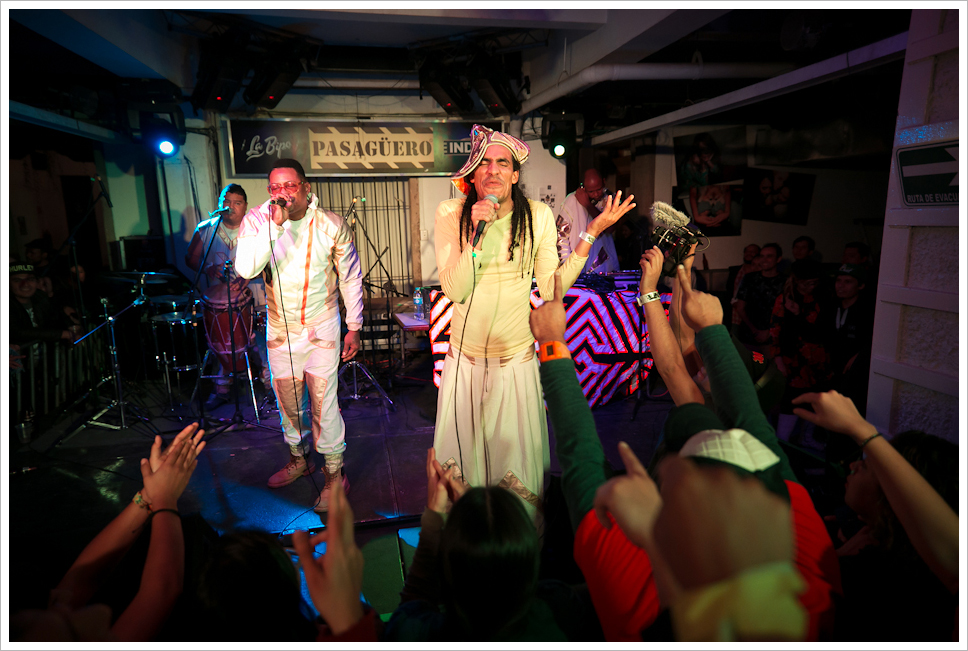
- Systema Solar in 2014

Background information
- Also known as: Systema
- Origin: Santa Marta, Colombia
- Genres: Funk; psychedelic funk; funk rock; acid rock; progressive soul
- Years active: 2006–present
- Labels: Nacional Records, Polen Records

Systema Solar is a Colombian artistic collective of musicians, visual artists, and film producers, active as a band since 2006. It is known for its party-oriented sound, which is influenced by the sound system DJ culture of the Caribbean. Their music combines elements of Caribbean Colombian music, champeta, bullerengue, and cumbia, among other genres. The band released three full-length albums: Systema Solar (2010), La Revancha del Burro (2013), and Rumbo a Tierra (2017), and performed in several music festivals around Latin America, Europe, and the United States, such as Glastonbury, Lollapalooza, Estéreo Picnic, Roskilde and Couleur Café.

== History ==
=== 2006–2010: Formation and debut ===
The Systema Solar story began in earlier 2006 when the French visual artist Vanessa Gocksh and the Colombians musicians, Walter Hernández and Juan Carlos Pellegrino started recording the documentary Frekuensia Kolombiana (2008), which researched the diverse hip-hop scenes in Colombia. However, the official creation as an artistic collective subsequently arrived during an Art Biennial festival in Medellín, when Goscksh, offered some artists from the documentary to perform together as a musical act. At that time, they met part of Systema's current members, such as John Primera and DJ Corpas. Soon afterward, the hastily assembled musicians and artists made their debut performance in front of an audience of several thousand people as Systema Solar. The band's name was inspired by the sound system concept (Systema) and the meeting point where some traditional communities in the Caribbean Colombian make parties or dance events, often called "solar" (Solar).

In 2009, Systema released their eponymous album in Colombia with Inter Mundos Records, their independent music label. But in late 2010, Chusma Records, a German imprint that specializes in Latin alternative musical acts, released internationally Systema Solar and soon received positive reviews from international music critics. Among the reviews, Chris Nickson of AllMusic describes their debut album as an "excellent mixing", with "plenty of cumbia and ample hip-hop". Meanwhile, Mark Hudson from The Telegraph wrote that the band seems "mash a whole gamut of gritty indigenous sounds into an invigoratingly positive neighborhood party vibe". By this year, the band received a nomination for the Premios Nuestra Tierra for Best Rock, Alternative, or Electronic Artist that year.

=== 2010–present: International success ===
In 2009, Systema Solar released their self-titled debut album, which blended elements of cumbia, hip-hop, house and traditional Colombian rhythms. The following year, it was re-released on Chusma Records, gaining traction within Colombia’s alternative music scene. In March 2016, an expanded edition of the album was issued by Nacional Records, featuring additional tracks from their 2013 release La Revancha del Burro.

In January 2017, the group released Rumbo a Tierra through Nacional Records. The album’s lead single, “Rumbera,” achieved international attention after being included on the soundtrack for the video game FIFA 17. The term “rumbera” comes from Colombian slang derived from “rumbero” (party animal), here used in the feminine form to describe a woman who enjoys partying. The track and its accompanying music video challenge gender stereotypes by portraying women of different ages, gender identities, body types and ethnic backgrounds. This theme was reinforced through the group’s #DaleLaVueltaMama campaign, aimed at promoting diversity and rejecting restrictive expectations of women.

Following the international re-release of their self-titled debut album, Systema Solar expanded their touring presence, appearing at festivals such as Vive Latino, SXSW, Glastonbury, Lollapalooza, WOMAD and various European gatherings. Their energetic live shows marked by visual projections and performance art-have solidified their reputation as one of Colombia’s most innovative musical exports.

== Critical reception ==
Rolling Stone named the 2016 reissue of Systema Solar the third best Latin album of 2016, writing, "Vibrant and demanding, the Colombian psychedelic soundsystem champions the causes of immigrants and POC while commanding bystanders to get rowdy on the dance floor."

NPR's Jessica Diaz-Hurtado wrote that Rumbo a Tierra "...takes listeners on a colorful and politically urgent journey", describing it as "a protest album that never lets its innovation stand in the way of its forcefulness." Ryan Patrick gave the album an 8 out of 10 rating in Exclaim!, writing that "Systema Solar bring a "party with a message" mentality that melds future and folk sounds with innovative flair."

== Discography ==
- Systema Solar (2009)
- La Revancha Del Burro (2013)
- Rumbo A Tierra (2017)
- Futurx Primitivx 20|25 (2025)

== Awards and nominations ==
List of awards and nominations received by Systema Solar
| Year | Association | Category | Nominated work | Result | Ref. |
|---|---|---|---|---|---|
| 2010 | Premios Nuestra Tierra | Best Rock, Alternative or Electronic Artist | Themself | Nominated | |
| 2012 | Premios SHOCK | Best Artist or Group | Themself | Nominated | |
| 2016 | Premios SHOCK | Best Artist or Group | Themself | Nominated | |
| 2016 | Premios SHOCK | "Rumbera" | Best Alternative Radio Song | Nominated | |
| 2016 | Premios SHOCK | Rumbo a Tierra | Best Independent Album | Won | |
