= Gossip discography =

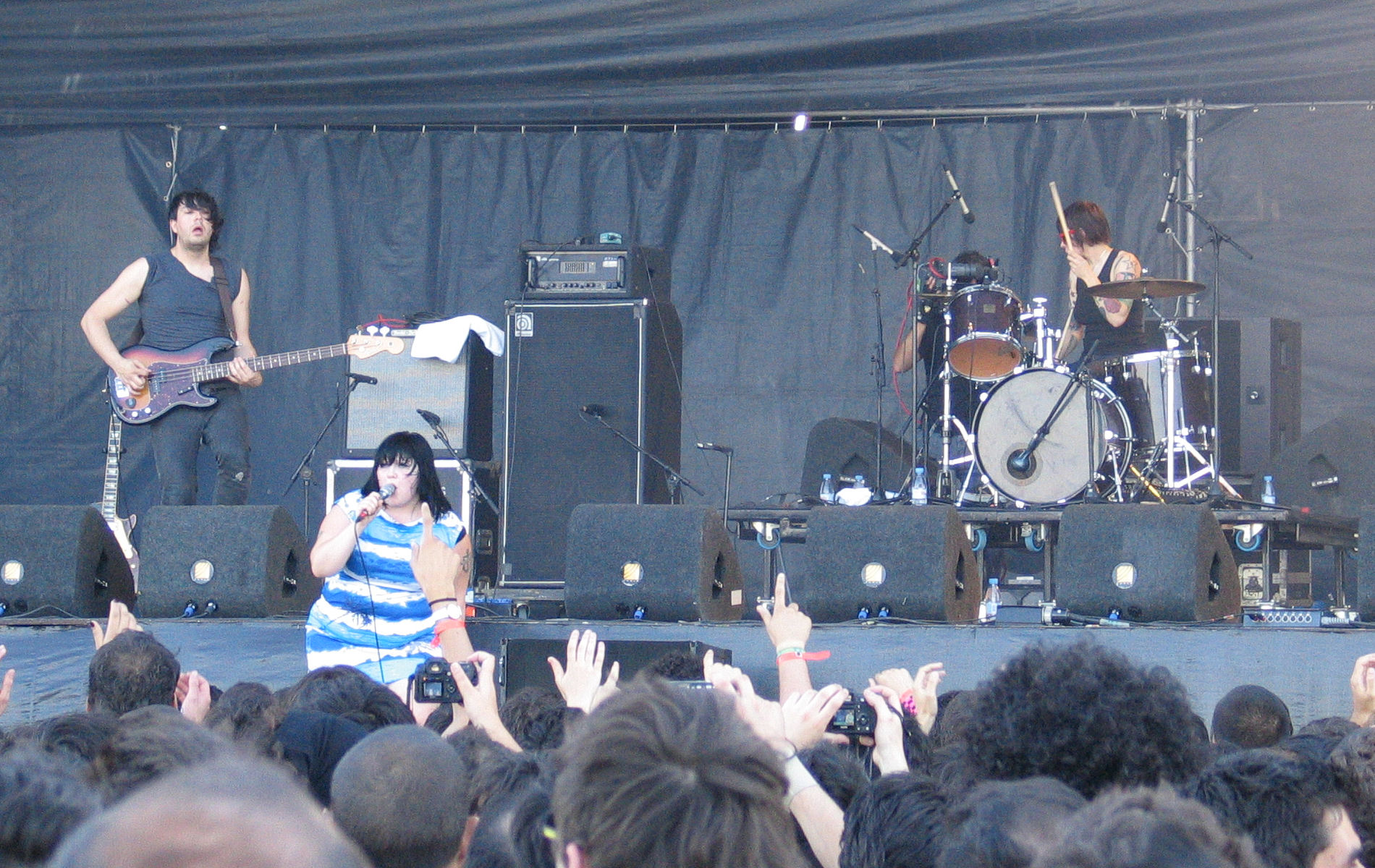
- Gossip performing in 2007
- Studio albums: 6
- Extended plays: 7
- Live albums: 4
- Compilation albums: 2
- Singles: 12
- Music videos: 10
- Other appearances: 4

The discography of Gossip, an American indie rock band, consists of six studio albums, four live albums, two compilation albums, seven extended plays, twelve singles, and ten music videos. The group was founded in 1999 by vocalist Beth Ditto, guitarist Brace Paine and drummer Kathy Mendonca while attending Evergreen State College in Olympia, Washington. The following year they released a self-titled EP on the independent record label K Records. Gossip released their debut studio album, That's Not What I Heard, in January 2001. Their second EP, Arkansas Heat, was issued the next year. Movement, the band's second studio album, and a live album titled Undead in NYC followed in 2003.

In November 2003, Mendonca left the group. She was replaced by Hannah Billie on the Gossip's third studio album Standing in the Way of Control, released in January 2006. The album reached number 22 in the United Kingdom and was certified gold by the British Phonographic Industry. Three singles, "Standing in the Way of Control", "Listen Up!" and "Jealous Girls", were released from the album: "Standing in the Way of Control" peaked at number seven in the UK and number 25 in Ireland.

Gossip worked extensively with producer Rick Rubin in recording their fourth studio album, Music for Men, which was released in October 2009. The album peaked at number 164 on the US Billboard 200 and reached the top ten in Austria, France and Germany. Four singles were released from the album: "Heavy Cross", "Love Long Distance", "Pop Goes the World" and "Men in Love", with "Heavy Cross" charting at number two in Germany and Switzerland.

Their fifth studio album, A Joyful Noise, was released in May 2012 and featured collaborations with British production team Xenomania and French DJ Fred Falke. The album peaked at number one in Switzerland and number two in Germany – it was certified gold by the Swiss branch of the International Federation of the Phonographic Industry and the Bundesverband Musikindustrie in Germany. The album produced three singles: "Perfect World", "Move in the Right Direction" and "Get a Job", with "Move in the Right Direction" reaching number three in Austria and number 11 in Germany.

== Albums ==
=== Studio albums ===
Title	Album details	Peak chart positions									Certifications
Title	Album details	US	AUS	AUT	FRA	GER	IRE	NZ	SWI	UK	Certifications
That's Not What I Heard	Released: January 23, 2001 (US); Label: Kill Rock Stars; Formats: CD, DD, LP	—	—	—	—	—	—	—	—	—	
Movement	Released: May 6, 2003 (US); Label: Kill Rock Stars; Formats: CD, DD, LP	—	—	—	—	—	—	—	—	—	
Standing in the Way of Control	Released: January 24, 2006 (US); Label: Kill Rock Stars; Formats: CD, DD, LP	—	—	—	34	—	31	—	—	22	BPI: Gold
Music for Men	Released: October 6, 2009 (US); Label: Columbia; Formats: CD, DD, LP	164	13	4	5	10	27	28	12	18	BVMI: 3× Gold; ARIA: Gold; IFPI AUT: Platinum; IFPI SWI: Platinum; SNEP: 2× Platinum
A Joyful Noise	Released: May 22, 2012 (US); Label: Columbia; Formats: CD, DD, LP	100	35	4	3	2	66	—	1	47	BVMI: Gold; IFPI SWI: Gold; SNEP: Gold
Real Power	Released: March 22, 2024; Label: Columbia; Formats: Digital download, streaming	—	—	16	—	8	—	—	11	68	
"—" denotes a recording that did not chart or was not released in that territory.

=== Live albums ===
Title	Album details
Undead in NYC	Released: September 9, 2003 (US); Label: Dim Mak; Format: CD, DD
The Gossip Live At the Casbah 07/24/2004	Released: July 24, 2004 (US); Label: Re:Live; Format: DD
The Gossip Live at the Metro 09/25/2004	Released: September 25, 2004 (US); Label: Re:Live; Format: DD
Live in Liverpool	Released: December 7, 2007 (AUS); Label: Columbia; Formats: CD, DD, LP

=== Remix albums ===
Title	Album details
RMXD	Released: November 12, 2007 (AUS); Label: Popfrenzy; Format: CD
Rework It	Released: July 7, 2008 (US); Label: Back Yard; Format: CD

== Extended plays ==
Title	Details
The Gossip	Released: July 25, 2000 (US); Label: K (IPU096); Formats: CD, DD, LP
Arkansas Heat	Released: May 7, 2002 (US); Label: Kill Rock Stars (KRS384); Formats: CD, DD, LP
Real Damage (with Tracy + the Plastics)	Released: January 25, 2005 (US); Label: Dim Mak (DM075); Formats: CD, DD, LP
GSSP RMX	Released: August 22, 2006 (US); Label: Kill Rock Stars (KRS473); Formats: CD, DD
NRJ Sessions: Gossip	Released: March 9, 2010 (FRA); Label: Sony; Format: DD
Live from Abbey Road	Released: July 8, 2011 (UK); Label: Sony; Format: DD
A Joyful Noise RMX	Released: November 16, 2012 (US); Label: Columbia; Format: DD

== Singles ==
Title	Year	Peak chart positions									Certifications	Album
Title	Year	US Dance	AUS	AUT	FRA	GER	IRE	NZ	SWI	UK	Certifications	Album
"Standing in the Way of Control"	2006	—	—	—	—	—	25	—	—	7	BPI: Gold	Standing in the Way of Control
"Listen Up!"	2006	—	—	—	—	—	—	—	—	39		Standing in the Way of Control
"Yr Mangled Heart"	2006	—	—	—	—	—	—	—	—	—		Standing in the Way of Control
"Jealous Girls"	2007	—	—	—	—	—	—	—	—	89		Standing in the Way of Control
"Heavy Cross"	2009	8	7	4	23	2	28	12	2	37	ARIA: Platinum; BPI: Silver; BVMI: 3× Gold; IFPI SWI: Platinum	Music for Men
"Love Long Distance"	2009	—	49	—	—	30	—	—	41	—		Music for Men
"Pop Goes the World"	2009	13	—	—	—	53	—	—	—	—		Music for Men
"Men in Love"	2009	—	—	—	—	58	—	—	—	—		Music for Men
"Perfect World"	2012	8	—	16	27	13	—	—	11	—	BVMI: Gold	A Joyful Noise
"Move in the Right Direction"	2012	17	—	3	64	11	—	—	27	—	BVMI: Platinum; IFPI AUT: Gold	A Joyful Noise
"Get a Job"	2013	—	—	—	—	—	—	—	—	—		A Joyful Noise
"Crazy Again"	2023	—	—	—	—	—	—	—	—	—		Real Power
"Real Power"	2024	—	—	—	—	—	—	—	—	—		Real Power
"—" denotes a recording that did not chart or was not released in that territory.

=== Promotional singles ===
Title	Year	Peak chart positions	Album
Title	Year	BEL (FL)	Album
"Drunken Maria"/"Monk Chant" (with The Raincoats)	2009	—	Silver Monk Time
"Get Lost"	2012	13	A Joyful Noise
"—" denotes items which were not released in that country or failed to chart.

== Other appearances ==
These songs have not appeared on a studio album released by Gossip.

Title	Year	Album
"I Want It (To Write)"	2001	Flying Sidekick Home Alive Compilation II
"Snake Appeal"	2002	Night School
"Drunken Maria"	2006	Silver Monk Time – A Tribute to the Monks
"Careless Whisper"	2009	Uncovered: A Unique Collection of Cool Cover Versions

== Music videos ==
Title	Year	Director(s)
"Standing in the Way of Control"	2007	Lance Bangs
"Listen Up!"	2007	Morgen Dye
"Jealous Girls"	2007	Oliver Evans
"Heavy Cross"	2009	Lance Bangs
"Love Long Distance"	2009	Joel Trussell
"Pop Goes the World"	2010	Philip Andelman
"Men in Love"	2010	Cody Critcheloe and Justin Kelly
"Perfect World"	2012	Price James
"Move in the Right Direction"	2012	Price James
"Get a Job"	2013	Price James
