= A Joyful Noise (Gossip album) =

Studio album by Gossip
- Released: May 11, 2012
- Studio: KBC (Portland, Oregon); Xenomania (Kent, England)
- Genre: Dance-punk; indie rock; synth-pop; alternative dance
- Length: 44:04
- Label: Columbia
- Producer: Brian Higgins; Gossip

Gossip chronology
Music for Men (2009)	A Joyful Noise (2012)	Real Power (2024)

Singles from A Joyful Noise
- 1. "Perfect World" Released: March 13, 2012; 2. "Move in the Right Direction" Released: June 29, 2012; 3. "Get a Job" Released: April 5, 2013

A Joyful Noise is the fifth studio album by American indie rock band Gossip, released on May 11, 2012, by Columbia Records. The album was produced by Xenomania founder Brian Higgins.

== Critical reception ==
Professional ratings
Aggregate scores
Source	Rating
Metacritic	60/100
Review scores
Source	Rating
AllMusic	3.5/5 stars
Clash	6/10
Drowned in Sound	4/10
Entertainment Weekly	B−
The Guardian	3/5 stars
The Independent	4/5 stars
NME	3/10
Pitchfork	5.9/10
PopMatters	5/10
Slant Magazine	2.5/5 stars

A Joyful Noise received generally mixed reviews from music critics. At Metacritic, which assigns a normalized rating out of 100 to reviews from mainstream publications, the album received an average score of 60, based on 24 reviews, which indicates "mixed or average reviews". Andy Gill of The Independent gave the album four out of five stars, writing that "the involvement of Brian Higgins on A Joyful Noise enables the group to break new ground with confidence". The Guardian's Caroline Sullivan gave the album three out of five stars and stated that "it's Girls Aloud producer Higgins to the rescue, with a sound influenced by Abba and Madonna. Having said that, Gossip—especially Beth Ditto, in waspishly fine voice here—seem very much at home with it." However, Priya Elan of NME felt that "[g]ood moments are squandered by unsatisfying choruses and/or weak lyrics." The Independent on Sunday's Simon Price expressed that after a few years of career, Ditto "already feels like a footnote", adding that the band pairing up with Higgins "should be a stroke of genius, but Higgins has caught Ditto & co at a point where they appear to have disastrously lost their fire."

== Commercial performance ==
A Joyful Noise debuted at number 100 on the Billboard 200, selling 5,000 copies in its first week. In Europe, the album debuted at number 47 on the UK Albums Chart with first-week sales of 2,822 copies, while reaching number one in Switzerland, number two in Germany, number three in France, number four in Austria and number eight in Belgium.

== Track listing ==
All tracks are written by Beth Ditto, Nathan Howdeshell, and Hannah Billie, except where noted.

No.	Title	Length
1.	"Melody Emergency"	3:51
2.	"Perfect World" (writers: Gossip, Brian Higgins, Luke Fitton, Toby Scott)	4:27
3.	"Get a Job"	4:59
4.	"Move in the Right Direction" (writers: Gossip, Xenomania)	3:31
5.	"Casualties of War"	4:15
6.	"Into the Wild"	3:13
7.	"Get Lost"	4:07
8.	"Involved"	4:15
9.	"Horns"	3:45
10.	"I Won't Play"	3:19
11.	"Love in a Foreign Place"	4:22

European iTunes Store bonus tracks
No.	Title	Length
12.	"Perfect World" (Rory Phillips Mix)	5:04
13.	"Move in the Right Direction" (Classixx Remix)	4:38
14.	"Perfect World" (video)	3:49

Amazon Germany digital bonus tracks
No.	Title	Length
12.	"Heavy Cross"	4:02
13.	"Standing in the Way of Control" (live)	4:49
14.	"Listen Up" (live)	4:42

German extended edition bonus track
No.	Title	Length
12.	"Seems So Bad"	4:03

German extended edition bonus disc
No.	Title	Length
1.	"Love Long Distance" (1LIVE in Dortmund)	4:21
2.	"Listen Up!" (1LIVE in Dortmund)	5:10
3.	"Melody Emergency" (1LIVE in Dortmund)	3:59
4.	"Men in Love" (1LIVE in Dortmund)	3:37
5.	"Get a Job" (1LIVE in Dortmund)	4:52
6.	"Perfect World" (RAC Mix)	4:13
7.	"Perfect World" (Seamus Haji Remix Radio Edit)	3:04
8.	"Perfect World" (Playgroup Nude Mix)	8:06
9.	"Move in the Right Direction" (CSS Remix)	4:02
10.	"Move in the Right Direction" (Seamus Haji Radio Edit)	3:53
11.	"Move in the Right Direction" (Gossip vs Kaz James Remix)	6:34
12.	"Get a Job" (Peter Rauhofer Remix)	8:47
13.	"Get a Job" (Scissor Sisters Remix)	6:14
14.	"Get a Job" (Wankelmut Remix)	7:21

Japanese edition bonus tracks
No.	Title	Length
12.	"Perfect World" (RAC Mix)	4:14
13.	"Move in the Right Direction" (Classixx Remix)	4:38
14.	"Perfect World" (Seamus Haji Remix)	6:24

== Personnel ==
Credits adapted from the liner notes of A Joyful Noise.

=== Gossip ===
- Beth Ditto – vocals
- Hannah Billie – drums, percussion
- Nathan Howdeshell – live bass, guitars, keyboards, programming

=== Additional musicians ===
- Jeremy Sherrer – additional percussion
- Brian Higgins – additional programming (all tracks); additional composition (track 4)
- Luke Fitton – additional programming
- Owen Parker – additional programming
- Toby Scott – additional programming (all tracks); additional composition (track 4)
- Matt Gray – additional programming
- Joshua Jenkin – additional programming
- Sam Martin – additional programming
- Jerry Bouthier – additional programming
- Andrea Gorgerino – additional programming
- Fred Falke – additional programming (all tracks); additional composition (track 4)
- Jason Resch – additional programming (all tracks); additional composition (track 4)
- Kieran Jones – additional programming (all tracks); additional composition (track 4)

=== Technical ===
- Brian Higgins – production (all tracks); mixing (tracks 4–7, 9–11)
- Gossip – additional production
- Toby Scott – special production assistance, engineering (all tracks); mixing (tracks 4–7, 9–11)
- Jeremy Sherrer – engineering
- Ben Taylor – recording engineering assistance
- Matt Gray – mixing (tracks 4–7, 9–10)
- Rich Costey – mixing (tracks 1–3)
- Chris Kasych – logic engineering (tracks 1–3)
- Serban Ghenea – mixing (track 8)
- John Hanes – engineering for mix (track 8)
- Phil Seaford – engineering assistance (track 8)
- Tom Coyne – mastering

=== Artwork ===
- Rankin – photography
- Mike Larremore – additional photography
- Jeri Lynn – art direction

== Charts ==
=== Weekly charts ===
Weekly chart performance for A Joyful Noise
Chart (2012)	Peak position
Argentine Albums (CAPIF)	10
Australian Albums (ARIA)	35
Austrian Albums (Ö3 Austria)	4
Belgian Albums (Ultratop Flanders)	8
Belgian Albums (Ultratop Wallonia)	14
Canadian Albums (Nielsen SoundScan)	87
Danish Albums (Hitlisten)	37
Dutch Albums (Album Top 100)	35
Finnish Albums (Suomen virallinen lista)	44
French Albums (SNEP)	3
German Albums (Offizielle Top 100)	2
Greek Albums (IFPI)	39
Irish Albums (IRMA)	66
Italian Albums (FIMI)	48
Polish Albums (ZPAV)	34
Scottish Albums (OCC)	51
Spanish Albums (Promusicae)	38
Swiss Albums (Schweizer Hitparade)	1
UK Albums (OCC)	47
US Billboard 200	100
US Top Alternative Albums (Billboard)	20
US Top Rock Albums (Billboard)	35

=== Year-end charts ===
Year-end chart performance for A Joyful Noise
Chart (2012)	Position
Austrian Albums (Ö3 Austria)	53
Belgian Albums (Ultratop Flanders)	59
Belgian Albums (Ultratop Wallonia)	92
French Albums (SNEP)	62
German Albums (Offizielle Top 100)	36
Swiss Albums (Schweizer Hitparade)	42

== Certifications ==
Certifications for A Joyful Noise
Region	Certification	Certified units/sales
France (SNEP)	Gold	50,000^{*}
Germany (BVMI)	Gold	100,000^{^}
Switzerland (IFPI Switzerland)	Gold	15,000^{^}
^{*} Sales figures based on certification alone.^{^} Shipments figures based on certification alone.

== Release history ==
Release dates and formats for A Joyful Noise
Region	Date	Format	Edition	Label	Ref(s)
Germany	May 11, 2012	CD; LP; digital download	Standard	Sony	
Ireland	May 11, 2012	CD; digital download	Standard	Columbia	
France	May 14, 2012	CD; LP; digital download	Standard	Sony	
United Kingdom	May 14, 2012	CD; LP; digital download	Standard	Columbia	
Australia	May 18, 2012	CD; digital download	Standard	Sony	
United States	May 22, 2012	CD; digital download	Standard	Columbia	
Japan	June 13, 2012	CD	Standard	Sony	
Germany	November 2, 2012	2-CD; digital download	Extended	Sony	
