= Real Power =

Studio album by Gossip
- Released: March 22, 2024
- Recorded: 2019–2023
- Length: 39:58
- Label: Columbia
- Producer: Rick Rubin

Gossip chronology
A Joyful Noise (2012)	Real Power (2024)

Singles from Real Power
- 1. "Crazy Again" Released: November 17, 2023; 2. "Real Power" Released: January 19, 2024

Real Power is the sixth studio album by American indie rock band Gossip. It was released on March 22, 2024, through Columbia Records. The album marks their first studio release in twelve years, following A Joyful Noise (2012), marking the longest gap between studio album releases in their career.

== Background ==
The album was produced by Rick Rubin, who previously worked with the band for their 2009 album Music for Men. Recording began in 2019 at Rubin's home studio in Kauai, Hawaii, following a brief tour reunion for the 10-year anniversary of Music For Men. Recording came to a halt during the COVID-19 pandemic and resumed when restrictions were lifted. Ditto explained that Real Power was originally intended as a follow-up to her debut solo album, Fake Sugar, but that, when she invited Gossip member Nathan Howdeshell to participate in writing some songs for the project, the duo realised that it actually needed to be a Gossip album rather than a Beth Ditto album.

Gossip described working with Rubin as "a true gift", saying that they felt "genuinely cared about and supported" as he "creates calm, positive, open spaces". About 30–40 songs came about from the sessions with Rubin, after having thrown "everything against the wall" and having the "best time". Real Power is a "celebration of creative expression" and the power that came out of choosing family in the aftermath of "collective and personal trauma", according to a press release.

== Critical reception ==
Professional ratings
Aggregate scores
Source	Rating
Metacritic	75/100
Review scores
Source	Rating
AllMusic	3.5/5 stars
DIY	4/5 stars
The Guardian	3/5 stars
The Independent	3/5 stars
MusicOMH	4/5 stars
NME	4/5 stars
Pitchfork	7.1/10
The Skinny	3/5 stars
Slant Magazine	2.5/5 stars
The Telegraph	5/5 stars

Real Power was met with "generally favorable" reviews from critics. At Metacritic, which assigns a weighted average rating out of 100 to reviews from mainstream publications, this release received an average score of 75, based on 13 reviews.

== Track listing ==
All tracks are written by Beth Ditto and Brace Paine. Additional writing on "Tell Me Something" by Jason Lader.

Real Power track listing
No.	Title	Length
1.	"Act of God"	3:21
2.	"Real Power"	4:15
3.	"Don't Be Afraid"	3:34
4.	"Crazy Again"	3:17
5.	"Edge of the Sun"	3:48
6.	"Give It Up for Love"	2:54
7.	"Turn the Card Slowly"	4:27
8.	"Tell Me Something"	4:09
9.	"Light It Up"	3:06
10.	"Tough"	3:38
11.	"Peace and Quiet"	3:29
Total length:		39:58

== Personnel ==
Gossip

- Beth Ditto – vocals
- Nathan Howdeshell – electric guitar, acoustic guitar, synthesizer, bass, electronic drums
- Hannah Billie – drums, percussion

Technical

- Rick Rubin – production
- Jason Lader – engineering, mixing
- Dylan Neustadter – engineering
- Heba Kadry – mastering

Visuals

- Cody Critcheloe – cover art, photography
- Bráulio Amado – design

== Charts ==
Chart performance for Real Power
Chart (2024)	Peak position
Austrian Albums (Ö3 Austria)	16
Belgian Albums (Ultratop Flanders)	88
Belgian Albums (Ultratop Wallonia)	47
German Albums (Offizielle Top 100)	8
Scottish Albums (Official Charts)	13
Swiss Albums (Schweizer Hitparade)	11
UK Albums (Official Charts)	68
