= Jealous Girls =

Single by Gossip

from the album Standing in the Way of Control
- Released: August 20, 2007
- Length: 3:39
- Label: Kill Rock Stars; Back Yard (UK)
- Songwriters: Beth Ditto; Nathan Howdeshell; Hannah Billie

Gossip singles chronology
"Listen Up!" (2006)	"Jealous Girls" (2007)	"Heavy Cross" (2009)

"Jealous Girls" is a single by the band Gossip. It is the third single from their album Standing in the Way of Control and was released on August 20, 2007.

The cover was designed by David Lane. Different covers were designed for different formats featuring different stills from the song's video.

== Track listing ==
=== UK CD single ===
1. "Jealous Girls" (Album version)
2. "Jealous Girls" (Live version)
3. "Coal to Diamonds"
4. "Jealous Girls" (Video)

=== UK 7-inch single ===
1. "Jealous Girls" (Album version)
2. "Jealous Girls" (New Young Pony Club Mix)

=== UK 7-inch single 2 ===
1. "Jealous Girls" (Live version)
2. "Jealous Girls" (Tommie Sunshine's Brooklyn Fire Retouch)

=== UK 12-inch single ===
1. "Jealous Girls" (Alavi Rerox)
2. "Jealous Girls" (Dolby Anol Remix)

== Personnel ==
- Beth Ditto – vocals
- Brace Paine – guitar, bass guitar
- Hannah Billie – drums, backing vocals

== Charts ==
Chart (2007)	Peak position
UK Singles (Official Charts)	89
