= Undead in NYC =

Live album by The Gossip
- Released: September 9, 2003
- Recorded: 2002
- Genre: Indie rock
- Length: 25:42
- Label: Dim Mak

The Gossip chronology
Movement (2003)	Undead in NYC (2003)	Real Damage (2005)

Professional ratings
Review scores
Source	Rating
AllMusic	3/5 stars
Pitchfork	6.9/10

Undead in NYC is a live album by American indie rock band Gossip (under their old name The Gossip), it was released on September 9, 2003.

== Track listing ==
1. "All This Waiting" – 2:08
2. "Non Non Non" – 3:20
3. "Don't (Make Waves)" – 2:41
4. "Rules For Love" – 2:17
5. "The Truth" – 1:54
6. "Gone Tomorrow" – 2:15
7. "Confessor" – 2:54
8. "Arkansas Heat" – 2:16
9. "Dangerr" – 2:17
10. "Wanna Be Yr Dog" (featuring The Chromatics) – 5:00

== Personnel ==
- Beth Ditto – vocals
- Brace Paine – guitar, bass guitar
- Kathy Mendonca – drums
