= Men in Love =

Men in Love may refer to:

- Men in Love (song)
- Men in Love (film)

== See also ==
- Man in Love (disambiguation)
