= Move in the Right Direction =

Single by Gossip

from the album A Joyful Noise
- Released: July 1, 2012
- Recorded: KBC Records (Portland, Oregon); Xenomania Studios (Kent, England)
- Genre: Dance-punk; synth-pop
- Length: 3:31
- Label: Columbia
- Songwriters: Frederick Falke; Brian Higgins; Kieran Rhys Jones; Beth Ditto; Jason Resch; Toby le Messurier Scott
- Producer: Brian Higgins

Gossip singles chronology
"Perfect World" (2012)	"Move in the Right Direction" (2012)	"Get a Job" (2013)

"Move in the Right Direction" is a song by American indie rock band Gossip, released as the second single from their fifth studio album, A Joyful Noise (2012). The song found some success in Europe, reaching number two in Poland and number three in Austria and Hungary. The accompanying music video was directed by Price James.

== Track listings ==
- UK and Irish iTunes EP – Remixes
1. "Move in the Right Direction" – 3:31
2. "Move in the Right Direction" (CSS Remix) – 4:02
3. "Move in the Right Direction" (Seamus Haji Remix) – 6:40
4. "Move in the Right Direction" (Kaz James Remix) – 6:34
5. "Move in the Right Direction" (Classixx Remix) – 4:36
- German iTunes EP – Remixes
1. "Move in the Right Direction" (Radio Edit) – 3:12
2. "Move in the Right Direction" (Seamus Haji Radio Edit) – 3:53
3. "Move in the Right Direction" (Classixx Remix) – 4:36
4. "Move in the Right Direction" (CSS Remix) – 4:02
5. "Move in the Right Direction" (Gossip vs. Kaz James Remix) – 6:34
6. "Move in the Right Direction" (music video) – 3:18
- German CD single
1. "Move in the Right Direction" (Radio Edit) – 3:12
2. "Move in the Right Direction" (Album Version) – 3:31

== Personnel ==
Credits adapted from A Joyful Noise album liner notes.

Gossip

- Gossip – additional production
- Beth Ditto – vocals
- Hannah Blilie – drums, percussion
- Nathan Howdeshell – guitar, keyboards, live bass, programming

Additional personnel

- Tom Coyne – mastering
- Fred Falke – additional programming, composition
- Luke Fitton – additional programming
- Matt Gray – additional programming, mixing
- Brian Higgins – additional programming, composition, mixing, producer
- Joshua Jenkin – additional programming
- Kieran Jones – additional programming, composition
- Sam Martin – additional programming
- Owen Parker – additional programming
- Jason Resch – additional composition, additional programming, composition
- Toby Scott – additional programming, composition, mixing, special production assistant
- Jeremy Sherrer – additional percussion, engineer
- Ben Taylor – assistant recording engineer

== Charts ==
=== Weekly charts ===
Chart (2012)	Peak position
Austria (Ö3 Austria Top 40)	3
Belgium (Ultratop 50 Flanders)	17
Belgium (Ultratop 50 Wallonia)	37
France (SNEP)	64
Germany (GfK)	11
Hungary (Rádiós Top 40)	3
Ireland (IRMA)	39
Luxembourg Digital Songs (Billboard)	7
Polish Airplay Chart	2
Slovakia Airplay (ČNS IFPI)	40
Switzerland (Schweizer Hitparade)	27
US Dance Club Songs (Billboard)	17

Chart (2013)	Peak position
Slovenia (SloTop50)	28

=== Year-end charts ===
Chart (2012)	Position
Austria (Ö3 Austria Top 40)	39
Belgium (Ultratop Flanders)	100
Germany (Official German Charts)	36
Hungary (Rádiós Top 40)	21

== Release history ==
Region	Date	Format(s)	Label
Ireland	July 1, 2012	Digital download	Columbia
United Kingdom	July 1, 2012	Digital download	Columbia
Germany	August 17, 2012	CD single, digital download	Sony

== Certifications ==
Region	Certification	Certified units/sales
Austria (IFPI Austria)	Gold	15,000^{*}
Germany (BVMI)	Platinum	300,000^{^}
^{*} Sales figures based on certification alone.^{^} Shipments figures based on certification alone.
