= Standing in the Way of Control =

Studio album by Gossip
- Released: January 24, 2006
- Recorded: 2005
- Studio: Bear Creek Studios, Seattle, Washington
- Genre: Indie rock, garage rock, dance-rock, post-punk revival
- Length: 35:31
- Label: Back Yard Recordings, Kill Rock Stars
- Producer: Guy Picciotto, Ryan Hadlock

Gossip chronology
Real Damage (2005)	Standing in the Way of Control (2006)	Music for Men (2009)

Professional ratings
Aggregate scores
Source	Rating
Metacritic	72/100
Review scores
Source	Rating
AllMusic	4.5/5 stars
The A.V. Club	B+
Entertainment Weekly	B+
Mojo	3/5 stars
NME	7/10
Pitchfork	6.8/10
Q	3/5 stars
Rolling Stone	3/5 stars
Spin	A−
URB	4/5 stars

Standing in the Way of Control is the third studio album by American indie rock band Gossip, which was released on January 24, 2006. The album was produced by Guy Picciotto and Ryan Hadlock It reached number 1 on the UK indie chart and also reached Gold status in the United Kingdom.

Irish Times described Beth Ditto's performance on the album as "a compelling combination of Brenda Lee, Dolly Parton and Siouxsie Sioux." Describing the title track, journalist Kevin Courtney noted that it was a "barnstorming indie-electro-disco stomper".

The title track also serves as the unofficial theme song to the British teen drama Skins, as its use in the DVD menu and promotional material led viewers to associate it with the series. It is also featured on the show's soundtrack album.

== Track listing ==
All songs written by Gossip.

Standard edition
No.	Title	Length
1.	"Fire with Fire"	2:49
2.	"Standing in the Way of Control"	4:16
3.	"Jealous Girls"	3:39
4.	"Coal to Diamonds"	4:00
5.	"Eyes Open"	2:10
6.	"Yr Mangled Heart"	4:22
7.	"Listen Up!"	4:18
8.	"Holy Water"	2:43
9.	"Keeping You Alive"	3:47
10.	"Dark Lines"	3:27
Total length:		35:31

Australia & New Zealand version (bonus tracks)
No.	Title	Length
11.	"Here Today Gone Tomorrow"
12.	"Sick with It"

2007 re-release (bonus tracks)
No.	Title	Length
11.	"Listen Up!" (2007 version)
12.	"Standing in the Way of Control" (Soulwax Nite Version)

Some versions of the album have an eleventh bonus track, the Le Tigre remix of the track "Standing in the Way of Control".

== Personnel ==
- Beth Ditto – vocalist
- Brace Paine – guitar, bass guitar, piano on "Dark Lines"
- Hannah Billie – drums, backing vocals on "Jealous Girls" and "Yr Mangled Heart"
- Ryan Hadlock and Guy Picciotto at Bear Creek Recording Studio in Seattle Washington – production, recording, mixing

== Charts ==
=== Weekly charts ===
Chart (2006–07)	Peak position
Belgian Albums (Ultratop Flanders)	68
French Albums (SNEP)	34
UK Albums (OCC)	22

=== Year-end charts ===
Chart (2007)	Position
UK Albums (OCC)	114

== Certifications and sales ==
Region	Certification	Certified units/sales
United Kingdom (BPI)	Gold	187,270
