= Movement (The Gossip album) =

Studio album by Gossip
- Released: May 6, 2003
- Genre: Indie rock
- Length: 30:39
- Label: Kill Rock Stars

Gossip chronology
Arkansas Heat (2002)	Movement (2003)	Undead in NYC (2003)

Professional ratings
Aggregate scores
Source	Rating
Metacritic	81/100
Review scores
Source	Rating
AllMusic	4/5 stars
Drowned in Sound	2.5/5
Pitchfork	7.8/10
Spin	B+ /
The Village Voice	C+

Movement is the second studio album by American indie rock band Gossip, it was released on May 6, 2003.

== Track listing ==
No.	Title	Length
1.	"Nite"	2:26
2.	"Jason's Basement"	2:00
3.	"No, No, No"	1:57
4.	"Don't (Make Waves)"	2:34
5.	"All My Days"	2:41
6.	"Yesterday's News"	4:10
7.	"Fire/Sign"	2:33
8.	"Confess"	2:18
9.	"Lesson Learned"	1:27
10.	"Dangerrr"	2:16
11.	"Light Light Sleep"	6:17
Total length:		30:39

== Personnel ==
- Beth Ditto – vocalist, piano
- Brace Paine – guitar, bass guitar
- Kathy Mendonca – drums
