= I Wrote the Book =

I Wrote the Book may refer to:

- "I Wrote the Book" (Beth Ditto song), 2011
- "I Wrote the Book" (Morgan Wallen song), 2023
- "I Wrote the Book", by Matt King from the album Five O'Clock Hero (1997)
