= Fire (Beth Ditto song) =

Single by Beth Ditto

from the album Fake Sugar
- Released: April 3, 2017
- Genre: Southern rock
- Length: 3:10
- Label: Virgin
- Songwriter(s): Beth Ditto; Jennifer Decilveo
- Producer(s): Jennifer Decilveo

Beth Ditto singles chronology
"Running Low" (2014)	"Fire" (2017)

"Fire" is a song by American singer Beth Ditto. Produced and co-written by Jennifer Decilveo, it was released by Virgin Records in April 2017 as the lead single from Ditto's solo debut album, Fake Sugar. The single peaked on Billboard's Alternative Songs at number 40. The music video for the track was also released in April 2017.

"Fire" is a Southern rock song and features gospel-indebted vocals.

== Critical reception ==
musicOMH's John Murphy stated that the track "gets things started in a suitably smouldering way, a soulful, swaggering number that’s both slow-burning and, when the chorus kicks in, gloriously unrestrained." Graeme Virtue of The Guardian described the song as "a sexy mega-thumper enhanced by mournful melodica toots." Stereogum critic Pranav Trewn called the song "an audacious, groovy slow-burner built on a muted bassline and sold via firecracker guitars and an impeccable-as-ever vocal performance". According to The Independent's Andy Gill, the track's "predatory throb explodes into a chugging fuzz-rock boogie streaked with squalling guitars."

== Charts ==
Chart performance for "Fire"
Chart (2017)	Peak position
US Billboard Alternative Songs	40
