= Man in Love =

Man in Love may refer to:

- Man in Love (2014 film), a South Korean romance drama film
- Man in Love (2021 film), a Taiwanese romance drama film
- Man in Love, a song by Infinite from the EP New Challenge

== See also ==
- Men in Love (disambiguation)
