= Fake Sugar =

Studio album by Beth Ditto
- Released: June 16, 2017
- Genres: Southern rock; pop
- Length: 42:26
- Label: Virgin
- Producer: Jennifer Decilveo

Beth Ditto chronology
EP (2011)	Fake Sugar (2017)

Fake Sugar is the debut solo studio album by American singer Beth Ditto, known for her work with the dance-punk band Gossip. Produced by Jennifer Decilveo, it was released on June 16, 2017, through Virgin Records. The album's first single, "Fire", was released in April 2017. Incorporating influences from a wide array of genres, the album is regarded as Ditto's "embracement of her Southern roots".

== Composition ==
Fake Sugar is a Southern rock and pop album. AllMusic reported that the album's "polished pop ambitions allow Ditto to try on different sounds, whether it's the stomping glam-pop of "Oo La La" or "Go Baby Go," a tribute to Suicide's Alan Vega that borrows the duo's sleek beats." The A.V. Club stated: "The record revolves around pulsating disco grooves, corrugated pogo-punk riffs, and a glittering pop sheen, all arranged so there’s plenty of room for Ditto to stretch her voice and approach." The Guardian wrote that the record "runs the gamut of classic 1970s and 80s pop – Fleetwood Mac, Blondie, Suicide, Paul Simon – alongside the odd angular stomper that nods to the Soulwax remixes of her former band." Paste magazine noted that "while there are still elements of dance-pop weaved throughout the record, the album falls more comfortably between honky-tonk, soul and disco." PopMatters stated that Fake Sugar's sound "moves seamlessly from straight dance pop to a rawer, more soulful brand of R&B-indebted punk."

== Critical reception ==
Professional ratings
Aggregate scores
Source	Rating
Metacritic	74/100
Review scores
Source	Rating
The A.V. Club	B
AllMusic	3.5/5 stars
DIY	4/5 stars
The Guardian	4/5 stars
The Independent	3/5 stars
musicOMH	3/5 stars
The Observer	4/5 stars
Paste	7.0/10
Pitchfork	6.1/10
PopMatters	8/10 stars

At Metacritic, which assigns a normalized rating out of 100 to reviews from critics, the album received an average score of 74, based on 19 reviews, indicating "generally positive reviews". The A.V. Club critic Annie Zaleski stated: "Ditto’s powerhouse voice remains a steely, piercing instrument imbued with Southern sass and dynamic range." AllMusic's Heather Phares described the record as "a welcome return from a one-of-a-kind voice and personality who was missing from music for too long." Calling the album as a "surprisingly sweet listen", DIY magazine critic Lisa Wright thought that Fake Sugar "paints Ditto as a more diverse, often even restrained artist than the larynx-shredding punk aggressor of the mid-00s." Kate Hutchinson of The Guardian commented that the album "doesn’t make it much clearer what kind of pop star Ditto wants to be – but she’s one to be strutted to, at the very least." The Independent's Andy Gill described it as "a bit of a mixed bag – no great surprise".

musicOMH's John Murphy was mixed in his assessment of the record, stating: "It’s that smoothing of Ditto’s edges that prevents Fake Sugar from moving from a good, perfectly serviceable pop album to something truly great." Emily Mackay of The Observer wrote: "A couple of songs hang too much on their belting choruses, but moments such as the disco-Stones shuffle of Oo La La and the unabashed, dreamy balladry of Love in Real Life more than compensate, and it's a comfort to hear Ditto’s wise, dauntless voice once more." Paste critic Ilana Kaplan noted that the album "bridges the gap between love and loss and taps into her Southern roots to create a record that fully encompasses the person she's become." Pitchfork's Laura Snapes stated: "Ditto’s non-traditional view down a well-trodden path is welcome, but you do wish she'd kick up the dust a bit more." John Paul of PopMatters wrote that "there’s nothing fake about Ditto anywhere on the album, making Fake Sugar an overwhelmingly welcome return from one of pop music’s greatest vocal talents." The Skinny's Nadia Younes described the record as "a real reinvention for Beth Ditto, but it’s not so much of a reinvention that her signature traits are unrecognisable."

== Track listing ==
Fake Sugar track listing
No.	Title	Writer(s)	Length
1.	"Fire"	Beth Ditto; Jennifer Decilveo	3:10
2.	"In and Out"	Ditto; Decilveo	3:41
3.	"Fake Sugar"	Ditto; Decilveo	3:30
4.	"Savoir Faire"	Ditto; Decilveo	3:38
5.	"We Could Run"	Ditto; Decilveo	3:30
6.	"Oo La La"	Ditto; Garret Lee	3:30
7.	"Go Baby Go"	Ditto; Decilveo	3:04
8.	"Oh My God"	Ditto; Decilveo	4:45
9.	"Love in Real Life"	Ditto; Decilveo	4:05
10.	"Do You Want Me To?"	Ditto; Decilveo	3:09
11.	"Lover"	Ditto; Chris Braide	3:37
12.	"Clouds (Song for John)"	Ditto; Decilveo	2:31
Total length:			42:26

== Charts ==
Chart performance for Fake Sugar
Chart (2017)	Peak position
Australian Albums (ARIA)	89
Austrian Albums (Ö3 Austria)	23
Belgian Albums (Ultratop Flanders)	51
Belgian Albums (Ultratop Wallonia)	42
French Albums (SNEP)	24
German Albums (Offizielle Top 100)	22
Italian Albums (FIMI)	80
Scottish Albums (Official Charts)	29
Swiss Albums (Schweizer Hitparade)	11
UK Albums (Official Charts)	47
US Heatseekers Albums (Billboard)	3
