= EP (Beth Ditto EP) =

EP by Beth Ditto
- Released: January 10, 2011
- Genre: Electropop; dance-pop
- Length: 15:24
- Label: Deconstruction
- Producer: James Ford; Jas Shaw

Beth Ditto chronology
| EP (2011) | Fake Sugar (2017) |

EP is the debut solo release by American singer Beth Ditto. Released on January 10, 2011, through Deconstruction Records, the EP was produced by James Ford and Jas Shaw of Simian Mobile Disco.

== Composition ==
The EP features an electropop and dance-pop sound. According to AllMusic, the EP "takes its cue from the glossy dancefloors of the early Chicago house scene rather than the lo-fi garage rock of the '80s." AllMusic also reported that the track "I Wrote the Book" features "squelchy analog synths and retro house beats and described the track "Do You Need Someone" as "an atmospheric slice of new wave disco." NOW thought that the EP's "restrained approach perfectly fits with Simian Mobile Disco's dark, minimal groove contributions, which recall 80s synth pop but with fatter, modern bass lines."

== Critical reception ==
Professional ratings
Aggregate scores
| Source | Rating |
|---|---|
| Metacritic | 80/100 |
Review scores
| Source | Rating |
| AllMusic | 4/5 stars |
| NOW | 4/5 stars |
| Slant Magazine | 3.5/5 stars |
| Sputnikmusic | 4.5/5 |

The EP generally received positive reviews. At Metacritic, which assigns a normalized rating out of 100 to reviews from critics, the album received an average score of 80, based on seven reviews, indicating "generally positive reviews". AllMusic critic Jon O'Brien wrote: "If this is the precursor to a full-blown album, then Ditto couldn't have whetted the appetite any more." NOW's Kevin Ritchie described the EP as "a beautiful, sophisticated effort that gets richer with each listen" and "a welcome reprieve from most of today's club-oriented pop music, which too often has all the subtly of a chainsaw to the brain." Slant Magazine critic Huw Jones stated: "Despite wearing the crown of music’s most feral female talent, Ditto excels with EP because of her straightforward singing. She is near pitch-perfect with every turn, and seems to relish the opportunity to flex her vocal cords in this electronic environment." Sputnikmusic's emeritus critic Conrad Tao thought that "for its obvious melodic strengths, EP is a tease, slowly removing one layer at a time until its heart is revealed."

Andy Gill of The Independent was rather mixed in his assessment of the EP, stating: "Though inspired by Grace Jones's new-wave disco torch-songs, the results are markedly dissimilar: Ditto's far too engaged a singer to emulate Jones's aloof cool."

== Track listing ==
1. "I Wrote the Book" – 3:24
2. "Good Night Good Morning" – 3:54
3. "Open Heart Surgery" – 4:30
4. "Do You Need Someone" – 3:36

== Charts ==
Chart performance for EP
| Chart (2011) | Peak position |
|---|---|
| Australian Albums (ARIA) | 86 |
| French Albums (SNEP) | 67 |
| German Albums (Offizielle Top 100) | 78 |
| Swiss Albums (Schweizer Hitparade) | 45 |
| UK Singles (OCC) | 76 |
| US Top Dance Albums (Billboard) | 9 |
| US Heatseekers Albums (Billboard) | 27 |
