= That's Not What I Heard =

Studio album by The Gossip
- Released: January 23, 2001
- Genre: Garage rock
- Length: 24:00
- Label: Kill Rock Stars

The Gossip chronology
The Gossip (1999)	That's Not What I Heard (2001)	Arkansas Heat (2002)

Professional ratings
Review scores
Source	Rating
AllMusic	4.5/5 stars
CMJ	(favorable)
Robert Christgau	(2-star Honorable Mention)

That's Not What I Heard is the debut studio album by the American garage rock band Gossip (under their old name The Gossip), it was released on January 23, 2001.

== Track listing ==
No.	Title	Length
1.	"Swing Low"	1:18
2.	"Got All This Waiting"	1:47
3.	"Bones"	2:09
4.	"Sweet Baby"	1:41
5.	"Tuff Luv"	1:14
6.	"Got Body If You Want It"	2:02
7.	"Where the Girls Are"	1:44
8.	"Bring It On"	2:26
9.	"Heartbeats"	1:44
10.	"Catfight"	1:15
11.	"Jailbreak"	1:23
12.	"Southern Comfort"	1:07
13.	"And You Know..."	1:49
14.	"Hott Date"	2:16
Total length:		24:00

== Personnel ==
- Beth Ditto – vocals, piano
- Brace Paine – guitar, bass guitar
- Kathy Mendonça – drums
