= Running Low =

Single by Netsky featuring Beth Ditto
- Released: 3 August 2014
- Genre: Drum and bass
- Length: 3:21
- Label: Sony; Epic
- Songwriter(s): Mary Beth Patterson; Boris Daenen; Takura Tendayi; Zane Lowe
- Producer(s): Netsky

Netsky singles chronology
"We Can Only Live Today (Puppy)" (2012)	"Running Low" (2014)	"Rio" (2015)

Beth Ditto singles chronology
"A Rose by Any Name" (2013)	"Running Low" (2014)	"Fire" (2017)

Music video
- "Running Low" (official video) on YouTube

"Running Low" is a song by Belgian drum and bass record producer Netsky. The song features vocals by American singer-songwriter Beth Ditto. It was written by Ditto, Netsky, Takura Tendayi and Zane Lowe. The single was released on 3 August 2014 as a digital download in the United Kingdom and Belgium (and two weeks later in the US). It was released through Sony Music Entertainment and Epic Records as Netsky's major label debut.

The song topped the Belgian Singles Charts and became Netsky's first number-one single.

== Background and release ==
The song was premiered on 5 June 2014 on BBC Radio 1, where Zane Lowe named the track "Hottest Record in the World". During the show, Netsky announced his plans for the track to be included in his upcoming third studio album, III. However, it was later revealed that the song would not feature on the record. The full track was unveiled through Netsky's official SoundCloud page and through UKF Music's Drum & Bass channel on YouTube the same day.

=== Remixes ===
The remix EP for "Running Low" features an extended mix of the track, a drum and bass remix by Hospital Records artists (and former labelmates) Fred V & Grafix, and remixes by house/garage musicians Todd Edwards and Wookie.
The Fred V & Grafix Remix was also premiered through UKF Drum & Bass on 17 July. A one-and-a-half-minute-long video for the remix was published on 8 August through the official Hospital Records YouTube channel as well.

== Music video ==
A music video to accompany the release of "Running Low" was first published onto YouTube through Netsky's Vevo channel on 10 July 2014. It runs at a total length of three minutes and forty-four seconds.

== Track listing ==
Digital download
No.	Title	Length
1.	"Running Low" (feat. Beth Ditto)	3:21

Digital download (Remixes)
No.	Title	Length
1.	"Running Low" (Extended)	4:09
2.	"Running Low" (Fred V & Grafix Remix)	5:16
3.	"Running Low" (Todd Edwards Remix)	5:35
4.	"Running Low" (Wookie Remix)	5:25

== Credits and personnel ==
- Lead vocals – Beth Ditto
- Record producer – Netsky
- Label: Sony Music Entertainment, Epic Records

== Chart performance ==
=== Weekly charts ===
Chart (2014)	Peak position
Belgium (Ultratop 50 Flanders)	1
Belgium Airplay (Ultratop Flanders)	14
Belgium Dance (Ultratop Flanders)	1
Belgium (Ultratop 50 Wallonia)	21
Belgium Dance (Ultratop Wallonia)	38
Germany (GfK)	100
UK Dance (OCC)	21
UK Singles (OCC)	80

=== Year-end charts ===
Chart (2014)	Position
Belgium (Ultratop Flanders)	27

== Release history ==
Region	Date	Format	Label
Belgium	16 June 2014	Digital download – single	La Musique Fait La Force / N.E.W.S.
United Kingdom	11 July 2014	Digital download – single	Sony Music Entertainment UK Limited
United Kingdom	1 August 2014	Digital download (Remixes) – EP	Sony Music Entertainment UK Limited
Belgium	4 August 2014	Digital download (Remixes) – EP	La Musique Fait La Force / N.E.W.S.
United States	18 August 2014	Digital download – single	Ultra Records
United States	18 August 2014	Digital download (Remixes) – EP	Ultra Records
