= Heavy Cross =

2009 single by Gossip

Single by Gossip

from the album Music for Men
- Released: April 28, 2009
- Studio: Shangri La Studios, Malibu
- Genre: Dance-rock
- Length: 4:02
- Label: Columbia; Music with a Twist
- Songwriters: Beth Ditto; Brace Paine; Hannah Blilie
- Producer: Rick Rubin

Gossip singles chronology
"Jealous Girls" (2007)	"Heavy Cross" (2009)	"Love Long Distance" (2009)

Music video
- "Heavy Cross" on YouTube

"Heavy Cross" is a song by American band Gossip. It was released on April 28, 2009, as the first single from the band's fourth album Music for Men. The song was the first international hit for Gossip, reaching the top ten across Europe, with a massive commercial success in Germany. When writing it, the band was influenced by Donna Summer and Siouxsie and the Banshees. The band recorded a studio version of the song in early 2009, but they had already been playing it live for two years.

== Background and writing ==
Singer Beth Ditto explained to the NME that the song is: "about recreation and my friends, who I feel like are the ultimate creative re-creators." Composer and guitarist Nathan Howdeshell explained: "Heavy Cross' was an attempt to make my guitar sound like an Italo synth line. I had been listening to Charlie's 'Spacer Woman' and still can't get over the arpeggiated synth, so I detuned my strings to be the same notes and muted it and then came that song. Beth [Ditto] busted some Donna Summer elements, and since I have been listening to lots of darkwave, I put a bass synth on the track as opposed to a real bass: we wanted something steeped in '80s darkwave. I can't stop listening to 'Red Light' by Siouxsie and the Banshees. Hannah Blilie decided to stay on the drum rims for the majority of the track, making it more of a Creatures-type track (another Siouxsie Sioux reference)." "Heavy Cross" was recorded in a studio in early 2009, although the band had already been playing the song live for two years. They had started their 2007 Glastonsbury concert at the John Peel stage, performing an early version of it which was broadcast on BBC television. The song, especially the intro, has considerable similarities with the Knight Rider theme song.

== Commercial performance ==
The single was a commercial success. It reached the top 10 in Australia and on the US Billboard Hot Dance Club Songs chart from mid- to late 2009. It peaked just outside the top 10 in New Zealand, and made the top 40 in Ireland and the UK; Gossip had already achieved two top 40 singles in the latter region, with "Standing in the Way of Control" and "Listen Up!" in 2006.

The single was especially successful in Germany, where it was certified triple gold for selling over 450,000 copies and is, as of September 2010, the "most successful internationally produced single of all time". As of April 2011, the single had spent 97 weeks on the German Singles Chart without ever reaching No. 1, staying for 27 weeks in that chart's top 10. In 2011, it was included in a J'Adore advert from Dior, making it rise to fame again.

== Track listings ==
UK CD

1. "Heavy Cross"
2. "Heavy Cross" (Fred Falke Remix)

Australia CD

1. "Heavy Cross" (radio edit)
2. "Heavy Cross"
3. "Heavy Cross" (Fred Falke Remix)
4. "Heavy Cross" (Burns Remix)

== Personnel ==
- Beth Ditto – vocals
- Brace Paine – guitar, keyboards, bass guitar
- Hannah Blilie – drums

== Charts ==
=== Weekly charts ===
Chart (2009–2010)	Peak position
Australia (ARIA)	7
Austria (Ö3 Austria Top 40)	4
Belgium (Ultratop 50 Flanders)	4
Belgium (Ultratop 50 Wallonia)	3
Czech Republic Airplay (ČNS IFPI)	63
Europe (European Hot 100 Singles)	6
France (SNEP)	23
Germany (GfK)	2
Ireland (IRMA)	38
Israel (Media Forest)	7
Italy (FIMI)	4
Luxembourg Digital Songs (Billboard)	2
Netherlands (Dutch Top 40)	20
New Zealand (Recorded Music NZ)	12
Spain (Promusicae)	16
Switzerland (Schweizer Hitparade)	2
UK Singles (Official Charts)	37
US Dance Club Songs (Billboard)	8

NRJ Session

Chart (2012)	Peak position
France (SNEP)	82

=== Year-end charts ===
Chart (2009)	Position
Australian Singles Chart	48
Austrian Singles Chart	14
Belgian Singles Chart (Flanders)	9
Belgian Singles Chart (Wallonia)	16
German Singles Chart	8
Italian Singles Chart	23
Swiss Singles Chart	9
Chart (2010)	Position
Austrian Singles Chart	24
European Hot 100 Singles	44
German Singles Chart	26
Swiss Singles Chart	21
Chart (2012)	Position
Belgian Backcatalogue Singles Chart (Flanders)	5
Belgian Backcatalogue Singles Chart (Wallonia)	1

=== Decade-end charts ===
Char (2000–2009)	Position
German Singles Chart	33

== Certifications ==
Region	Certification	Certified units/sales
Australia (ARIA)	Platinum	70,000^{^}
Austria (IFPI Austria)	Platinum	30,000^{*}
Belgium (BRMA)	Platinum	
Germany (BVMI)	3× Gold	450,000^{^}
Italy (FIMI)	Platinum	20,000^{*}
New Zealand (RMNZ)	Gold	7,500^{*}
Switzerland (IFPI Switzerland)	Platinum	30,000^{^}
United Kingdom (BPI)	Silver	200,000^{‡}
^{*} Sales figures based on certification alone.^{^} Shipments figures based on certification alone.^{‡} Sales+streaming figures based on certification alone.
