= Listen Up! (Gossip song) =

2006 single by Gossip

Single by Gossip

from the album Standing in the Way of Control
- Released: July 17, 2006
- Length: 4:18 (album version); 3:33 (radio edit)
- Label: Kill Rock Stars; Back Yard (UK); Columbia
- Songwriter(s): Beth Ditto; Nathan Howdeshell; Hannah Billie

Gossip singles chronology
| "Standing in the Way of Control" (2005/2007) | "Listen Up!" (2006) | "Heavy Cross" (2009) |

"Listen Up!" is a song by American indie rock band Gossip, released in July 2006 from their third studio album, Standing in the Way of Control (2006). It was re-released in 2007, peaking at number 39 on the UK Singles Chart during this second run.

The "Tronik Youth" remix was included on the nightclub Cream's compilation Cream Summer 2007.

== Video ==
There are two versions of this music video. In the original version, directed by Morgen Dye, Beth Ditto is eating a pizza in response to jibes about her weight and several young people dancing to the track. In the 2007 version (billed as the radio version), a transgender woman and a transgender man walk around Portland, Oregon, cruising during the day, then later in the evening at a club the two stare at each other from across the dance floor and they start dancing together.

== Track listings ==
UK CD single

1. "Listen Up!" (Album version)
2. "Listen Up!"
3. "Listen Up!" (Tronik Youth remix)
4. "Are You That Somebody"
5. "Listen Up!" (Video)

UK 7-inch (2006)

1. "Listen Up!"
2. "Are You That Somebody"

UK 7-inch (2007)

1. "Listen Up!" (Radio edit)
2. "Listen Up!" (MSTRKRFT mix)

UK 7-inch picture disc (2007)

1. "Listen Up!" (2007 version)
2. "Listen Up!" (Live at the Astoria)

== Personnel ==
- Beth Ditto – vocals
- Brace Paine – guitar, bass guitar
- Hannah Billie – drums

== Charts ==
| Chart (2006) | Peak position |
|---|---|
| UK Singles (OCC) | 39 |
