= Underarm hair =

Human body hair

Details

Identifiers
- Latin: hirci
- TA98: A16.0.00.021
- TA2: 7061
- FMA: 70756

Underarm hair, also known as axillary hair or armpit hair, is human hair in the underarm area (axilla).

In some cultures, underarm hair removal through shaving or other means is common, particularly among women.

== Development ==
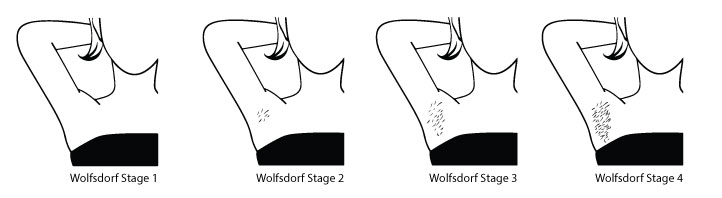
This is an illustration demonstrating the Wolfsdorf Staging for axillary hair development in children.

Underarm or axillary hair goes through four stages of development, as staged by the Wolfsdorf Axillary Hair Scale, driven by weak androgens produced by the adrenal in males and females during adrenarche, and testosterone from the testicle in males during puberty.

The Wolfsdorf Axillary Hair Staging system provides a standardized method for assessing pubertal progression and androgenic activity in pediatric populations. Similar to Tanner Staging for pubic hair, it classifies axillary hair growth into four stages:

- Wolfsdorf Stage 1 – No axillary hair
- Wolfsdorf Stage 2 – Sparse, soft hair
- Wolfsdorf Stage 3 – Coarser hair with increased volume
- Wolfsdorf Stage 4 – Full adult-like axillary hair

The importance of human underarm hair is unclear. It may naturally wick sweat or other moisture away from the skin, aiding ventilation. Colonization by odor-producing bacteria is thereby transferred away from the skin (see skin flora).

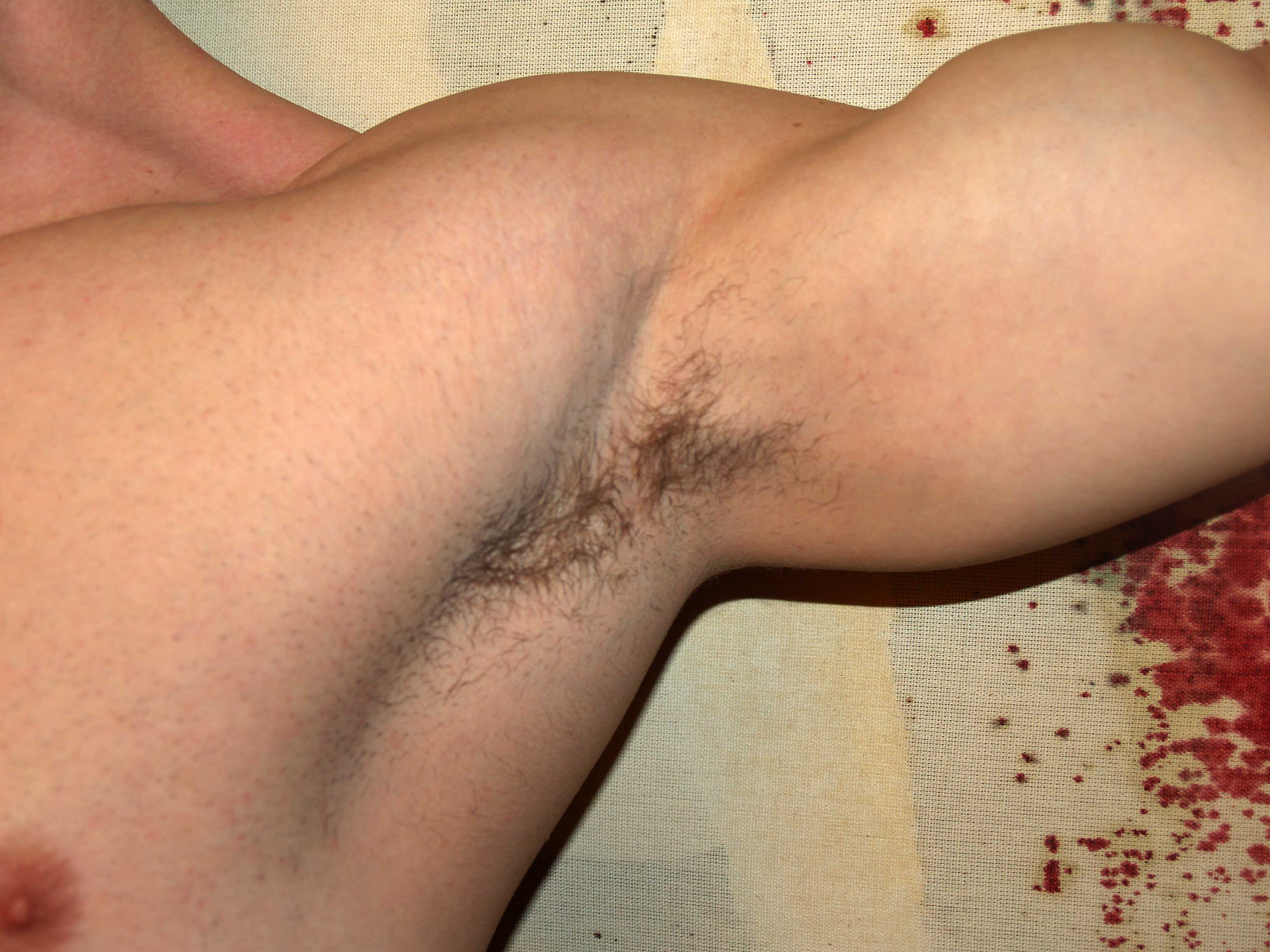
Male axilla

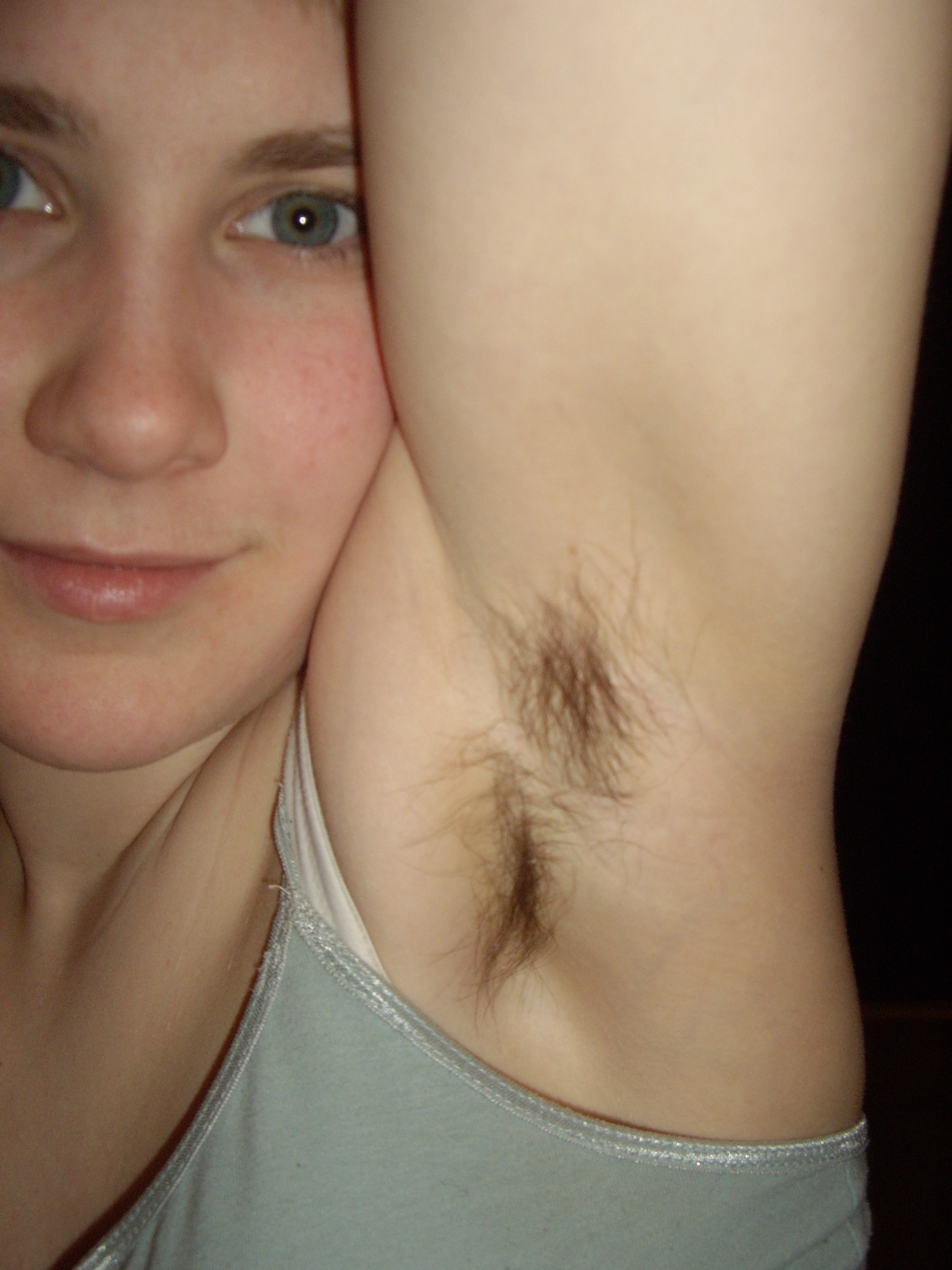
Female axilla

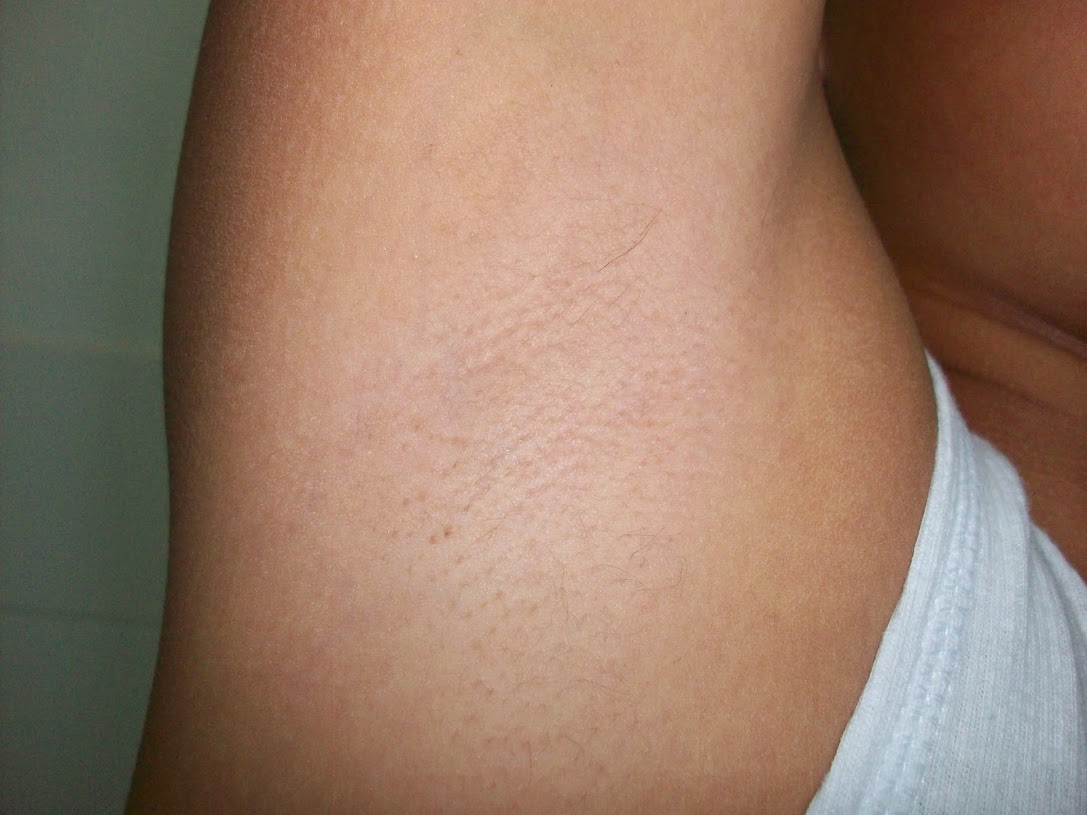
Axillia of a pubescent male, note the short, stray hairs characteristic of this stage (Wolfsdorf 2)

An adolescent's axilla, Wolfsdorf stage 3-4

== Function ==
=== Reducing friction ===
Armpit hair prevents skin-to-skin contact during activities that involve arm motion, such as running and walking. The same applies to pubic hair.

=== Spreading pheromones ===
The armpits release odor-containing pheromones, naturally produced chemicals that play an important role in sexual attraction. Armpit hair traps odor, making the pheromones even stronger. A study in 2018 including 96 heterosexual couples found that there were stress-relieving benefits to smelling a romantic partner's natural scent.

== Impact of hair removal ==
=== Effect on odor ===
А 2012 study on the impact of hair removal on odor found that shaved armpits were rated the same as unshaved armpits.

=== Chemical absorption ===
A 2017 study on chemical absorption from deodorants as a result of hair removal showed an increase in chemical absorption from .01% to .06% where skin has been damaged by recent shaving.

A 2003 study on aluminum antiperspirant usage and the age of breast cancer onset tentatively concluded that "underarm shaving with antiperspirant/deodorant use may play a role in breast cancer." However, later studies have disputed this and found no significant increase in breast cancer among users.

== See also ==
- Adrenal gland
- Adrenarche
- Ferriman–Gallwey score
- Hirsutism
- History of removal of leg and underarm hair in the United States
- Puberty
- Tanner staging
