= History of removal of leg and underarm hair in the United States =

At the outset of the United States, leg and underarm hair removal was not a common practice for women. In fact, body hair had been viewed as a boon by Caucasian people, and therefore removal was not an imported practice from European settlers into the United States. The removal of armpit and leg hair by American women became a new practice in the early 20th century due to a confluence of multiple factors.

One cultural change was the definition of femininity. In the Victorian era, it was based on moral character. This shifted in the early 1920s when the new feminine idea became based on the body. Women revealed more of their bodies in 1920s clothing; and at the same time they began using bras, makeup, and dieting. Author of The Body Project, J. Brumberg, summarizes, "The body itself became the fashion in the 1920s." In this context, hair removal was promoted as a sex norm requirement for women, to be attained through consumption and use of hair removal products.

== Upper lip, neck, arms, and chin hair ==
In 1858, Lola Montez wrote about several "unfortunate" women she knew who had attempted to remove "unfeminine" hair on the upper lip, neck, arms and chin using various methods that had produced ulcers. The book described an alternative method of waxing the hair away using a mixture of gaulbanum and "pitch plaster" attached to a leather strip, which was claimed to be both less painful and more effective.

== Underarm hair history ==
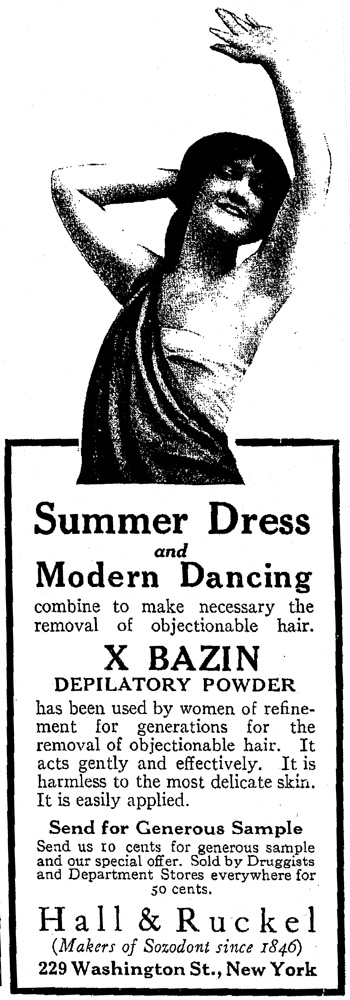
Advertisement for a depilatory powder named X Bazin

Developments in three industries enabled a heavy and effective advertising campaign beginning in 1908 to convince American people that female underarm hair was offensive. These industries were the male hair removal products industry, which had become recently commercially successful and sought to expand its market; the women's clothing fashion industry, which began producing sheer and sleeveless evening gowns and rising hemlines; and the mass production of women's magazines.

=== The market for female hair removal products ===
Men had already been shaving at barber's shops and later at home when a men's disposable "safety-razor" was introduced for home use in 1903. Quickly successful, Gillette sold 90,000 razor sets the next year. A female market for hair removal products, on the other hand, did not yet exist in the United States; that market had to be created. According to Hansen, a researcher on the topic, "The practice of removing hair from the underarms and legs was practically unheard of." She goes on, "In fact, hair removal was such a novel concept when it was first introduced that companies had to persuade women of the benefits of hair removal, and demonstrate how to practice it." The first razor marketed specifically to women came to market in 1915 from Gillette. From then to the 1930s, Gillette and dozens of other hair removal companies used the changes in women's clothing fashions as justification for the sudden need to remove underarm hair, and later leg hair. The message was distributed primarily and heavily through the newly born, popular and influential women's magazines.

=== Rise of women's magazines ===
The Delineator, first published in 1873, was the first women's magazine. Five others appeared soon after, comprising what became known as the "Big Six": Ladies' Home Journal, Woman's Home Companion, Good Housekeeping, McCall's, and Pictorial Review. The publisher of the Ladies Home Journal, Cyrus Curtis, told advertisers that the purpose of the magazine was to give manufacturers a way to market their products to women, not for the benefit of American women. The goal of advertisers was to not only fulfill women's needs; it was to create new ones. The amount of advertising for toiletries and beauty services were second only to advertisements for food. Estimated advertising spending between 1890 and 1914 grew from $190 million to $682 million.

Improvements in printing technologies, railroad transportation and postal services made mass circulation of these magazines possible. The population of women increased by two thirds between 1890 and 1920 and the literacy rate jumped to 94% in 1920. Both of these demographic shifts increased the audience for women's magazines.

The most popular women's magazine, Ladies' Home Journal, had 25,000 readers by the end of its first year. The reach of these women's magazines meant they were extraordinarily influential.

=== The Great Underarm Campaign ===
Advertisements suggesting that women remove hair under the arm, and explaining how and why to do so, were published as early as 1908, and ran more steadily beginning in 1914. The 1915 advertisement on the right ran in Harper's Bazaar for a depilatory powder called X Bazin is typical of ads during this time in that it defines why underarm hair removal is necessary. It also shows an image of a woman in a sleeveless gown with her arm up and the caption "Summer Dress and Modern Dancing combine to make necessary the removal of objectionable hair."

Advertisers were careful to use wording they felt would be more palatable to their audience, for example "smoothing" instead of "shaving" and "limbs" instead of "legs". The educational campaign on the benefits of and methods of hair removal persisted into the ads of the early 1920s and even continue today. Underarm hair in these ads was called "objectionable", "unwelcome", "embarrassing", "unsightly" and "unclean"; and its removal indicated a person who had "charm" and "the last touch of ‘feminine loveliness'" and was "modest", "dainty and perfectly groomed"; the practice was for "refined women" and "women of fashion."

Hair removal product manufacturers initially focused their marketing on the upper class. Beginning in 1934, a similar type of advertising showed up in the middle-class Ladies' Home Journal that had been running in upper class Harper's Bazaar for the past 15 years.

== Leg hair history ==
Overview chart of changes in hemline height (skirt length), 1805–2005

The 1920s extended the hairless ideal of the armpits to the legs as well. Hemlines rose on skirts and dresses from 1910 to 1927. Americans wore thick dark-colored stockings at first, which were taken over during this period by flesh-colored stockings to simulate the look of bare legs, without actually being bare.

Advertisements alluding to leg hair removal began in the 1920s. While ads between 1920 and 1940 do refer to legs, legs were not the focus in 90% of those ads. The first ad in Harper's Bazaar that focused primarily on the legs appeared in 1929. The ad campaign against leg hair was not as voluminous as the campaign against underarm hair had been. However, writers for beauty magazines and books did reinforce the hairless-leg message. This had not happened in the Underarm Campaign.

Leg hair removal gained popularity during World War II. Hosiery production plummeted suddenly in 1941 by 97% when the US War Production Board curtailed silk and nylon stockings manufacturing. In response, American women applied decals or "liquid stockings" (leg makeup) to simulate the seam of stockings, atop of shaved legs. Between 1942 and 1945, the War Production Board imposed further limits on cosmetic manufacturing, including leg makeup, taxing cosmetics as much as 20%. The norm to remove leg hair for women became very strong in the 1940s, more specifically, it moved from fad to custom in a matter of months in the early 1940s. A later survey, in 1964, indicated that 98% of American women aged 15–44 routinely shaved their legs.

== Modern practices ==
A century after these ad campaigns started, removal of leg and underarm hair by women in the U.S. is tremendously common and lack of removal is taboo in some circles. (Feminists of the 1970s and 1980s explicitly rejected shaving, though.) An estimated 80–99% of American women today remove hair from their bodies. Celebrity unshaven armpit appearances started to make headlines. For example, this was the case with actress Julia Roberts who sported unshaven underarms at the Notting Hill movie premiere in 1999. Anne Robinson, a presenter of the UK TV game show The Weakest Link, received a similar reaction after she exposed her underarm hair in an episode broadcast in 2008. Dated studies have found that many people—men and women alike—perceive women who do not remove body hair to be less sexually attractive, sociable and intelligent than the same woman without body hair, and have speculated that it may incite disgust among some men. However, some women are shunning the idea that they must adhere to hair removal routines normalized as a marketing ploy to sell beauty products.

== See also ==
- Body hair
- Consumerism
- Gillette
- Hair § Removal practices
- Hair removal
- History of women's magazines
- Leg shaving
- Neoteny in humans
- Shaving
- Underarm hair
