= Men in Love (song) =

Single by Gossip

from the album Music for Men
- Released: 29 October 2010
- Recorded: Shangri La Studios, Malibu
- Length: 3:41
- Label: Columbia
- Songwriter(s): Nathan Howdeshell; Hannah Billie; Mary Beth Patterson

Gossip singles chronology
"Pop Goes The World" (2010)	"Men in Love" (2010)	"Dimestore Diamond" (2010)

"Men in Love" is a 2010 song by Gossip, from their album Music for Men.

== Charts ==
Chart (2010)	Peak position
Germany (GfK)	58
