= Love Long Distance =

Single by Gossip

from the album Music for Men
- Released: September 13, 2009
- Studio: Shangri La (Malibu, California)
- Length: 4:25 (album version); 3:39 (radio edit)
- Label: Columbia; Music with a Twist
- Songwriters: Beth Ditto; Brace Paine; Hannah Billie
- Producer: Rick Rubin

Gossip singles chronology
"Heavy Cross" (2009)	"Love Long Distance" (2009)	"Pop Goes the World" (2010)

"Love Long Distance" is a song by American band Gossip, released as the second single from their album Music for Men. It was released on September 13, 2009, in the United States. The song quotes the refrain from "I Heard It Through the Grapevine" by Marvin Gaye. Ondarock noted "a shrewd reworking of Orchestral Manoeuvres in the Dark and New Order".

== Track listings ==
- Australian CD single
1. "Love Long Distance" (radio edit) – 3:39
2. "Love Long Distance" (Fake Blood Remix) – 4:36
3. "Love Long Distance" (Riva Starr Remix) – 5:56
4. "Love Long Distance" (Riva Starr Radio Edit) – 3:34
- European CD single
1. "Love Long Distance" – 4:24
2. "Love Long Distance" (Fake Blood Remix) – 4:36

== Charts ==
Chart (2009–2010)	Peak position
Australia (ARIA)	49
Belgium (Ultratop 50 Flanders)	32
Belgium (Ultratop 50 Wallonia)	36
Belgium Dance (Ultratop Flanders)	6
Germany (GfK)	30
Switzerland (Schweizer Hitparade)	41
