= I Wrote the Book (Beth Ditto song) =

Single by Beth Ditto

from the album EP
- Released: March 8, 2011
- Genre: Dance-pop; house
- Length: 3:24
- Label: Deconstruction
- Songwriters: Beth Ditto; James Ford; Jas Shaw
- Producers: James Ford; Jas Shaw

Beth Ditto singles chronology
"Cruel Intentions" (2010)	"I Wrote the Book" (2011)	"A Rose by Any Name" (2013)

Music video
- "I Wrote the Book" on YouTube

"I Wrote the Book" is a song performed by American recording artist Beth Ditto. Produced by James Ford and Jas Shaw of Simian Mobile Disco. The song was released in March 2011 as the first single from the Beth Ditto EP on Deconstruction Records.

== Music video ==
The music video for the song was uploaded to Ditto's official YouTube account on February 19, 2011, and contains several references to Madonna videos of the 1990s, such as "Justify My Love", "Vogue" and "Erotica".

The music video was filmed in black and white and takes place in a hotel.

== Charts ==
=== Weekly charts ===
Weekly chart performance for "I Wrote the Book"
Chart (2011)	Peak position
Austria (Ö3 Austria Top 40)	43
Belgium (Ultratop 50 Flanders)	6
Belgium (Ultratop 50 Wallonia)	13
France (SNEP)	89
Germany (GfK)	24
Netherlands (Dutch Top 40)	29
Netherlands (Single Top 100)	28
Switzerland (Schweizer Hitparade)	59
US Dance Club Songs (Billboard)	19
US Dance/Mix Show Airplay (Billboard)	19

=== Year-end charts ===
Year-end chart performance for "I Wrote the Book"
Chart (2011)	Position
Belgium (Ultratop Flanders)	42
Belgium (Ultratop Wallonia)	99
