= Perfect World (Gossip song) =

Single by The Gossip

from the album A Joyful Noise
- Released: March 13, 2012
- Recorded: Shangri La Studios, Malibu
- Genre: Dance-punk, hard rock
- Length: 4:27 (album version)
- Label: Columbia, Kill Rock Stars
- Songwriter(s): Mary Patterson, Brian Higgins, Toby Scott, Luke Fitton
- Producer(s): Brian Higgins

The Gossip singles chronology
"Men in Love" (2010)	"Perfect World" (2012)	"Move in the Right Direction" (2012)

"Perfect World" is the first single from indie rock band Gossip's fifth studio album A Joyful Noise. The song reached the top 40 in 6 countries with its biggest success in Switzerland, where the album also reached number 1.

== Track listing ==
=== Digital ===
1. "Perfect World" (radio edit)

=== CD single ===
1. "Perfect World" (radio edit)
2. "Perfect World" (instrumental)

== Chart performance ==
The song entered the top 30 in 6 different countries, reaching number 11 in Switzerland and number 13 in Germany, where it was certified Gold for shipments of 150,000 copies.

== Charts ==
=== Weekly charts ===
Chart (2011–2012)	Peak position
Austria (Ö3 Austria Top 40)	16
Belgium (Ultratop 50 Flanders)	12
Belgium (Ultratop 50 Wallonia)	16
France (SNEP)	27
Germany (GfK)	13
Switzerland (Schweizer Hitparade)	11
US Dance Club Songs (Billboard)	8

=== Year-end charts ===
Chart (2012)	Position
Belgium (Ultratop Flanders)	50
Belgium (Ultratop Wallonia)	67
France (SNEP)	151
Germany (Official German Charts)	81

== Certifications ==
Region	Certification	Certified units/sales
Germany (BVMI)	Gold	150,000^{^}
Switzerland (IFPI Switzerland)	Gold	15,000^{^}
^{^} Shipments figures based on certification alone.
