= Standing in the Way of Control (song) =

2005 single by Gossip

- Single insert artwork by Kim Gordon

Single by Gossip

from the album Standing in the Way of Control
- Released: 2005 (Le Tigre remix); 2006 (CD and vinyl single); March 5, 2007 (re-release)
- Genre: Indie rock; dance-rock; dance-punk
- Length: 4:16 (album version); 3:28 (radio edit)
- Label: Back Yard Recordings; Kill Rock Stars
- Songwriters: Hannah Billie; Nathan Howdeshell; Mary Beth Patterson
- Producers: Guy Picciotto; Ryan Hadlock

Gossip singles chronology
"Standing in the Way of Control" (2005)	"Listen Up!" (2006)

"Standing in the Way of Control" is a song by American indie rock band Gossip from their third studio album, Standing in the Way of Control. The remix by Le Tigre was released as Gossip's debut single in 2005 while the original was released as a single in 2006 and re-released on February 26, 2007. The 2006 issue had climbed up to number 13 on the UK Singles Chart in early 2007 on download sales, but the 2007 re-release was under a new catalogue number, meaning that their six-place climb to number seven on March 4 was listed as a new entry rather than as a climber. On the UK Indie Chart, it reached the top spot for one week.

The Soulwax Nite Versions remix of the song featured heavily in the advertising campaign for the 2007 E4 television drama, Skins. This version is also on the series' soundtrack album. Kim Gordon, bassist of Sonic Youth, contributed the cover art for the single. Brace Paine asked her to contribute her handwriting to the album as he had appreciated her "punk rock font" he once saw on an old UT flier.

In May 2007, NME magazine placed "Standing in the Way of Control" at number 23 in its list of the "50 Greatest Indie Anthems Ever". In October 2011, NME placed it at number 34 on its list "150 Best Tracks of the Past 15 Years". In 2009, Pitchfork placed the song at number 429 on its list "Top 500 Greatest Tracks of the 2000s".

== Song meaning ==
The song was written by lead singer Beth Ditto as a response to the Federal Marriage Amendment which would have constitutionally outlawed same-sex marriage in the United States. She says of the song:

Nobody in the States was that surprised or shocked by what Bush did, but it made everyone I know feel helpless and cheated. I wrote the chorus to try and encourage people not to give up. It’s a scary time for civil rights, but I really believe the only way to survive is to stick together and keep fighting.

== Music video ==
The video was recorded live in Liverpool, England.

== Composition ==
"Standing in the Way of Control" is a driving indie rock song with punk and disco influences.

The song is in common time with a chord sequence of Am-C-D-G in the key of C major.

== Track listings ==
Le Tigre Remix 12-inch vinyl

1. "Standing in the Way of Control"
2. "Standing in the Way of Control Remix" (Le Tigre remix)

UK CD single

1. "Standing in the Way of Control" (Radio edit)
2. "Standing in the Way of Control" (Le Tigre remix)
3. "Standing in the Way of Control" (Album version)
4. "Standing in the Way of Control" (Video CD-ROM)

UK 7-inch single

1. "Standing in the Way of Control" by Angie Tuck

UK 12-inch single

1. "Standing in the Way of Control" (Headman remix)
2. "Standing in the Way of Control" (Soulwax Nite version)
3. "Standing in the Way of Control" (Playgroup remix)
4. "Standing in the Way of Control" (Tronik Youth remix)

2007 UK CD single

1. "Standing in the Way of Control" (Radio Edit)
2. "Standing in the Way of Control" (Soulwax Nite Version)
3. "Coal to Diamonds"
4. "Standing in the Way of Control" (Video)

2006 7-inch single

1. "Standing in the Way of Control" (Le Tigre Remix, 7" edit)
2. "Standing in the Way of Control" (Live at the 100 Club London)

2006 7-inch single

1. "Standing in the Way of Control"
2. "Sick with It"

== Personnel ==
- Beth Ditto – vocals
- Brace Paine – guitar, bass guitar
- Hannah Billie – drums

== Charts ==
=== Weekly charts ===
Chart (2006–2007)	Peak position
Ireland (IRMA)	25
Scottish Singles Sales (Official Charts)	9
UK Singles (Official Charts)	7
UK Indie (Official Charts)	1

=== Year-end charts ===
Chart (2007)	Position
UK Singles (OCC)	64

== Certifications ==
Region	Certification	Certified units/sales
United Kingdom (BPI)	Gold	400,000^{‡}
^{‡} Sales+streaming figures based on certification alone.
