= Music for Men =

Studio album by Gossip
- Released: June 19, 2009
- Studios: Shangri-La Studios (Malibu, California)
- Genres: Indie rock; garage rock; dance-punk
- Length: 43:27
- Label: Columbia
- Producer: Rick Rubin

Gossip chronology
Standing in the Way of Control (2006)	Music for Men (2009)	A Joyful Noise (2012)

Singles from Music for Men
- 1. "Heavy Cross" Released: April 28, 2009; 2. "Love Long Distance" Released: September 13, 2009; 3. "Pop Goes the World" Released: March 8, 2010; 4. "Men in Love" Released: October 29, 2010

Music for Men is the fourth studio album by American indie rock band Gossip. It was released on June 19, 2009, by Columbia Records.

== Critical reception ==
Professional ratings
Aggregate scores
Source	Rating
Metacritic	69/100
Review scores
Source	Rating
AllMusic	4/5 stars
BBC Music	Favorable
Drowned in Sound	5/10
The Guardian	3/5 stars
The Independent	4/5 stars
Pitchfork	6.4/10
Planet Sound	4/10
Spin	3.5/5 stars
The Times	2/5 stars
Uncut	4/5 stars

Music for Men received generally positive reviews from music critics. At Metacritic, which assigns a normalized rating out of 100 to reviews from mainstream critics, the album has received an average score of 69, based on 26 reviews. In 2010, Music for Men earned Gossip a nomination for Outstanding Music Artist at the 21st GLAAD Media Awards.

== Commercial performance ==
Music for Men was successful in Europe, with sales of 280,000 copies in France alone, where it spent 138 weeks on the chart. It sold 42,000 copies in the United States as of December 2012.

== Track listing ==
All tracks are written by Gossip.

No.	Title	Length
1.	"Dimestore Diamond"	3:16
2.	"Heavy Cross"	4:06
3.	"8th Wonder"	3:17
4.	"Love Long Distance"	4:26
5.	"Pop Goes the World"	3:27
6.	"Vertical Rhythm"	3:50
7.	"Men in Love"	3:41
8.	"For Keeps"	4:08
9.	"2012"	3:51
10.	"Love and Let Love"	3:32
11.	"Four Letter Word"	3:49
12.	"Spare Me from the Mold"	2:28

Deluxe edition bonus tracks
No.	Title	Length
13.	"Pop Goes the World" (James Ford version)	3:26
14.	"Heavy Cross" (Fred Falke Remix)	8:08

European edition bonus tracks
No.	Title	Length
13.	"Heavy Cross" (Fred Falke Remix radio edit)	3:49
14.	"Heavy Cross" (Burns remix)	7:36
15.	"Love Long Distance" (Fake Blood remix)	4:36

US/Zune Marketplace release
No.	Title	Length
13.	"The Breakdown"	3:41

German extended edition bonus tracks (released October 22, 2010)
No.	Title	Length
13.	"The Breakdown"	3:41
14.	"Heavy Cross" (NRJ session)	4:16
15.	"Pop Goes the World" (NRJ session)	3:47
16.	"Listen Up" (NRJ session)	4:34
17.	"2012" (NRJ session)	3:39
18.	"Love Long Distance" (NRJ session)	5:25
19.	"Men in Love" (NRJ session)	3:01
20.	"Standing in the Way of Control" (NRJ session)	4:42

German extended edition bonus DVD (released October 22, 2010)
No.	Title	Length
1.	"Heavy Cross" (video)
2.	"Love Long Distance" (video)
3.	"Pop Goes the World" (video)
4.	"Four Letter Word" (video)
5.	"Heavy Cross" (Rock am Ring 2010 live performance)
6.	"Love Long Distance" (Rock am Ring 2010 live performance)
7.	"Pop Goes the World" (Rock am Ring 2010 live performance)
8.	"Men in Love" (Rock am Ring 2010 live performance)

== Personnel ==
Credits adapted from the liner notes of Music for Men.

Gossip

- Beth Ditto – vocals
- Hannah Billie – drums, illustration, percussion
- Brace Paine – art direction, bass, guitar, keyboards, sampler percussion

Additional personnel

- Jeri Lynn Beard – art direction
- Lee Broomfield – photography
- Lenny Castro – percussion
- Greg Fidelman – additional percussion, mixing, recording
- Meghan Foley – art direction
- James Ford – original drum elements (on "Pop Goes the World")
- Jason Gossman – editing
- Sara Lyn Killion – additional engineering
- Eric Lynn – additional engineering
- Vlado Meller – mastering
- Dana Nielsen – additional recording, editing, saxophone
- Rick Rubin – production
- Mark Santangelo – mastering assistance
- Andrew Scheps – additional mixing

== Charts ==
=== Weekly charts ===
Chart (2009–2010)	Peak position
Australian Albums (ARIA)	13
Austrian Albums (Ö3 Austria)	4
Belgian Albums (Ultratop Flanders)	3
Belgian Albums (Ultratop Wallonia)	13
Canadian Albums (Nielsen SoundScan)	175
Croatian International Albums (HDU)	27
Dutch Albums (Album Top 100)	31
European Albums (Billboard)	15
Finnish Albums (Suomen virallinen lista)	32
French Albums (SNEP)	5
German Albums (Offizielle Top 100)	10
Irish Albums (IRMA)	27
Italian Albums (FIMI)	29
New Zealand Albums (RMNZ)	28
Norwegian Albums (VG-lista)	34
Scottish Albums (Official Charts)	26
Spanish Albums (Promusicae)	100
Swiss Albums (Schweizer Hitparade)	12
UK Albums (Official Charts)	18
US Billboard 200	164
US Heatseekers Albums (Billboard)	8

=== Year-end charts ===
Chart (2009)	Position
Australian Albums (ARIA)	77
Austrian Albums (Ö3 Austria)	57
Belgian Albums (Ultratop Flanders)	28
Belgian Albums (Ultratop Wallonia)	73
European Albums (Billboard)	67
French Albums (SNEP)	28
German Albums (Offizielle Top 100)	55
Swiss Albums (Schweizer Hitparade)	55

Chart (2010)	Position
Austrian Albums (Ö3 Austria)	33
European Albums (Billboard)	36
French Albums (SNEP)	34
German Albums (Offizielle Top 100)	24
Swiss Albums (Schweizer Hitparade)	35

== Certifications and sales ==
Region	Certification	Certified units/sales
Australia (ARIA)	Gold	35,000^{^}
Austria (IFPI Austria)	Platinum	20,000^{*}
Belgium (BRMA)	Gold	15,000^{*}
France (SNEP)	2× Platinum	280,000
Germany (BVMI)	2× Platinum	400,000^{‡}
Switzerland (IFPI Switzerland)	Platinum	30,000^{^}
United States	—	42,000
Summaries
Worldwide	—	1,000,000
^{*} Sales figures based on certification alone.^{^} Shipments figures based on certification alone.^{‡} Sales+streaming figures based on certification alone.
