= Gossip (band) =

American rock band

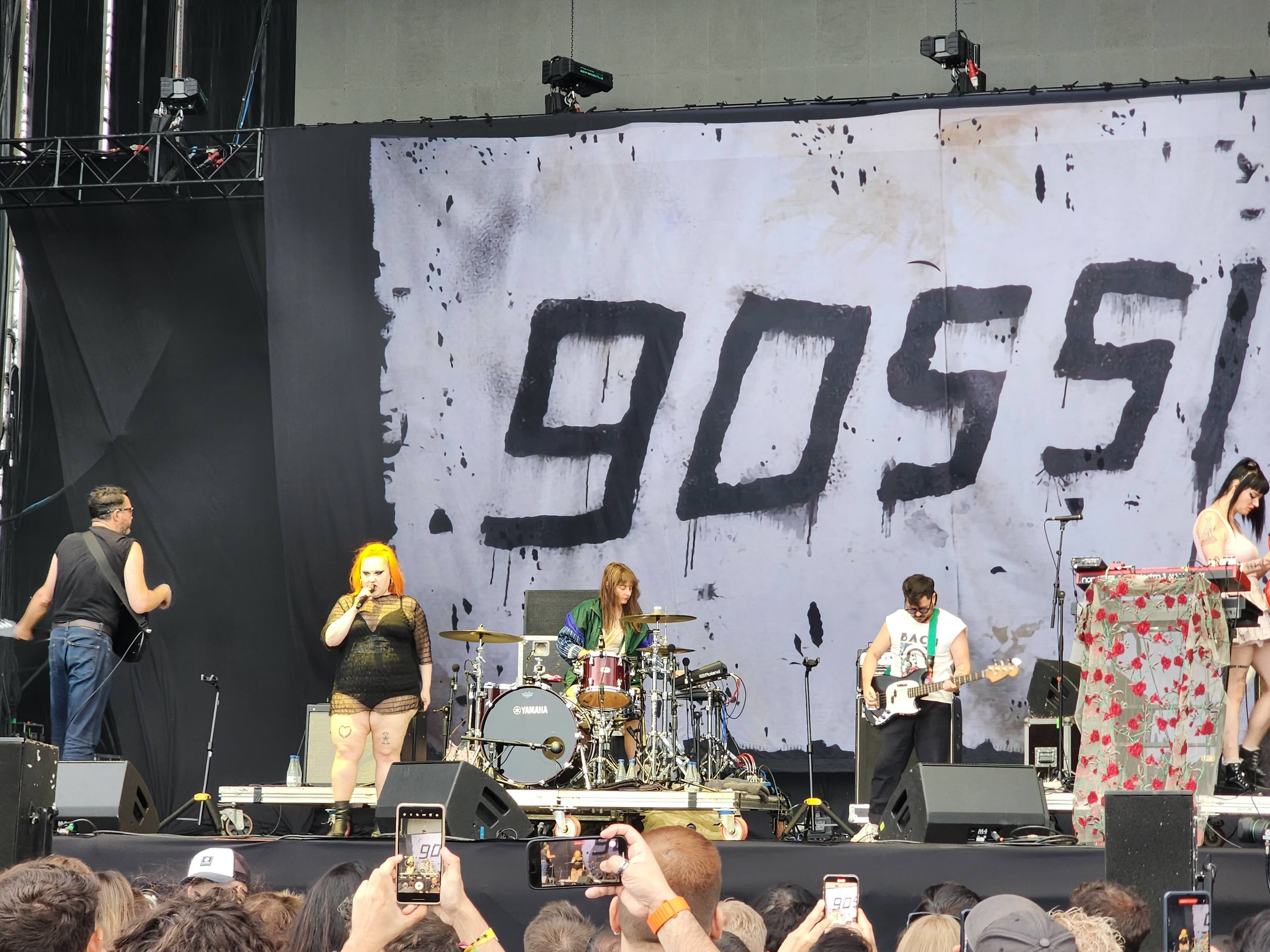
- Gossip performing in 2024

Background information
- Origin: Searcy, Arkansas, U.S.
- Genres: Indie rock; dance-rock; post-punk revival; garage rock (early)
- Works: Gossip discography
- Years active: 1999–2016; 2019–2020; 2023–present
- Labels: Back Yard; Kill Rock Stars; K; Columbia; Dim Mak
- Members: Beth Ditto; Nathan Howdeshell; Hannah Blilie
- Past members: Kathy Mendonça
- Website: readyforgossip.com

Gossip (or the Gossip) is an American indie rock band from Searcy, Arkansas, formed in 1999. For most of their career, the band has consisted of singer Beth Ditto, multi-instrumentalist Nathan "Brace Paine" Howdeshell, and drummer Hannah Blilie. After releasing several recordings, the band broke through with their 2006 studio album, Standing in the Way of Control. A follow-up, Music for Men, was released in 2009. The band played a mix of post-punk revival, indie rock, and dance-rock. Their fifth album, A Joyful Noise, was released in May 2012. They disbanded in 2016 but reformed to embark on an anniversary tour for Music for Men in 2019 and released the album Real Power in 2024.

== History ==
=== Formation and early history ===
Gossip was formed in 1999 in Olympia, Washington, by vocalist Beth Ditto, guitarist Nathan "Brace Paine" Howdeshell, and drummer Kathy Mendonça. All three were originally from Searcy, Arkansas; Mendonça moved to Olympia to attend Evergreen State College and Howdeshell and Ditto followed. Howdeshell and Mendonça had been in bands together in Arkansas. Gossip coalesced when the three members were roommates in Olympia.

In 1999, the independent record label K Records released Gossip's first recording, their debut EP The Gossip, to coincide with the band's tour with Sleater-Kinney. Gossip played at the first Ladyfest in Olympia in August 2000 and was included in Time magazine's article on the festival.

Their next record was the debut studio album That's Not What I Heard, released by the label Kill Rock Stars on January 23, 2001. They followed it with the EP Arkansas Heat on May 7, 2002. Movement, their second studio album, was released on May 6, 2003. In November 2003, two months after the release of their first live album Undead in NYC on September 9, drummer Kathy Mendonça left the band to pursue a career as a midwife. Established punk drummer Hannah Blilie joined to replace her. The band then dropped "the" from their name, continuing as "Gossip".

The first release featuring new drummer Hannah Blilie was the band's next album, Standing in the Way of Control. It was released on January 24, 2006, on Kill Rock Stars and later in 2006 on UK independent label Back Yard Recordings. The record was produced by Ryan Hadlock, owner of Bear Creek Studio, and Fugazi singer/guitarist Guy Picciotto.

=== 2007–2011: Mainstream success and moving to a major label ===
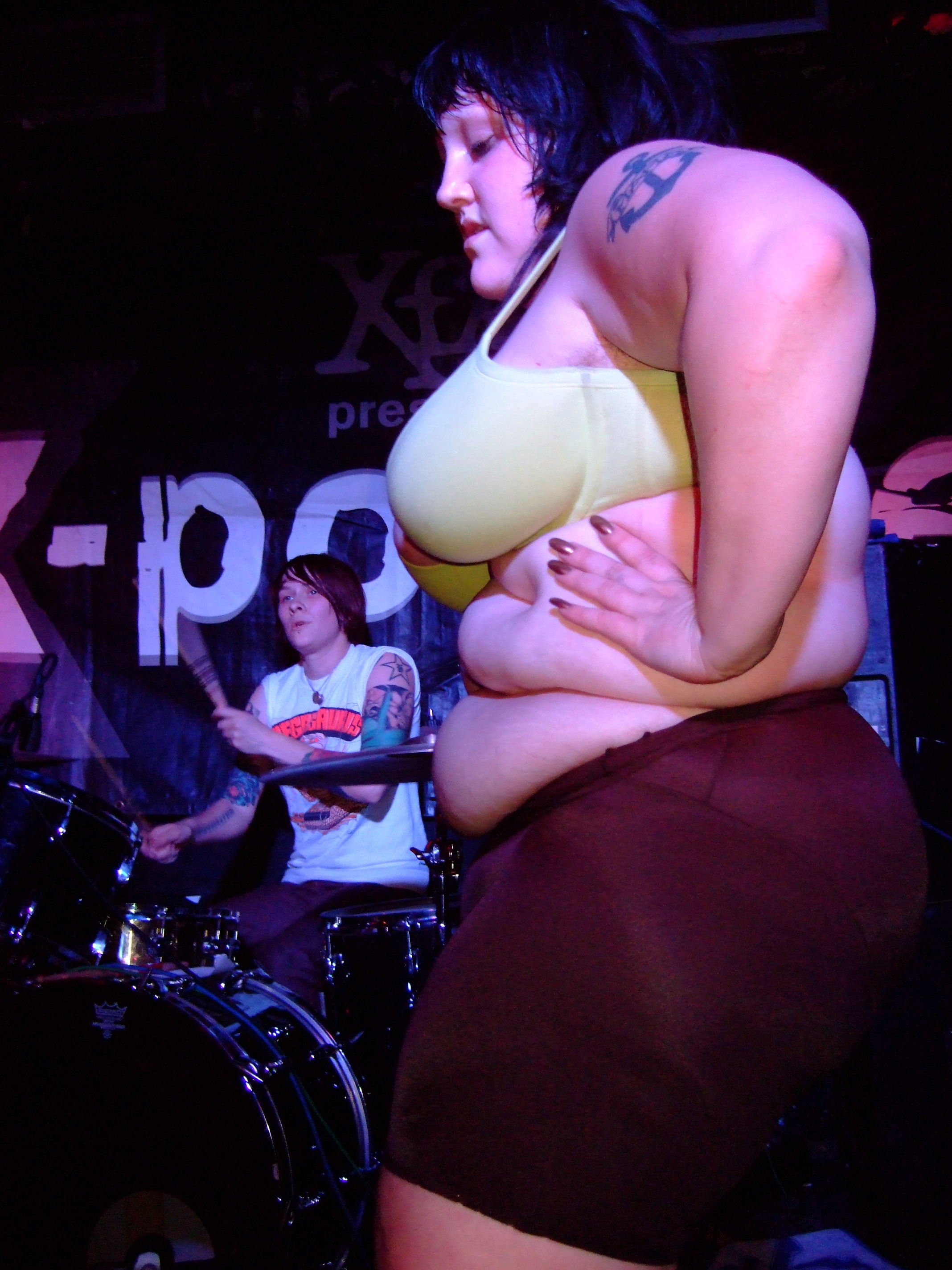
Gossip at the London Barfly, May 16, 2007

The album Standing in the Way of Control has earned Gold Record Status in the UK. Gossip's first UK TV appearance was on BBC1's Friday Night With Jonathan Ross, where they performed the title track "Standing in the Way of Control".

As reported on Pitchfork in March 2007, the group signed to Music With a Twist, a subsidiary of Sony Music Label Group, concentrating on LGBT music acts. During the summer of 2007, Gossip was a part of the multi-artist True Colors Tour 2007, which traveled through 15 cities in the United States and Canada. Hosted by comedian Margaret Cho and headlined by Cyndi Lauper, the tour also included Debbie Harry, Erasure, Rufus Wainwright, The Dresden Dolls, The MisShapes, The Cliks, and special guests. Profits from the tour went to benefit the Human Rights Campaign.

Gossip is based in Portland, Oregon and has played with bands such as Sleater-Kinney, Le Tigre, CSS, Erase Errata, Mika Miko, Panther, Comanechi, and Mates of State. They also opened for Scissor Sisters on three dates of their November 2006 tour.

On June 24, 2007, Gossip closed the Glastonbury Festival, playing the final set on the John Peel stage during which Ditto gave a tribute to the late John Peel. The band also performed the following year, on the Pyramid Stage.

Gossip launched their Live in Liverpool album in the UK and the U.S. in April 2008. The album was produced by Rick Rubin and also features a DVD of their live performance. A new studio album called Music For Men was released in June 2009. The first single from the album, "Heavy Cross", was especially successful in Germany where it was certified triple gold for selling over 450,000 copies, and was mentioned as the "most successful internationally produced single" of all time in September 2010. In January 2011 the single broke the German record for the longest-selling track in chart history. By January 14, 2011, it had spent 82 consecutive weeks on the German Top 100.

=== 2012–2016: A Joyful Noise, split ===
On March 12, 2012, the band's comeback single, "Perfect World", was unveiled on Zane Lowe's BBC Radio 1 show. Their fifth studio album, A Joyful Noise, produced by Xenomania's Brian Higgins, was released in late May. The band's music had evolved and become poppier. Andy Gill, writing in The Independent, welcomed the result, whereas Pitchfork's review was more negative. A second single, "Move in the Right Direction", was issued in May. During the summer, the band headlined various festivals.

In an interview with Pitchfork in February 2016, Ditto confirmed the split of Gossip. She stated that she intended to focus on her clothing line and music as a solo artist.

=== 2019–present: Tenth anniversary tour and Real Power ===
In March 2019, Ditto announced the band's return with a show in late July 2019 to celebrate the 10th anniversary of Music for Men. This later expanded into a world tour. The band played their final show of the tour at Rote Fabrik in Zurich, Switzerland on August 19, 2019. In October 2020, Ditto shared a photo to her Instagram page of herself with Paine and Mendonça in the studio together.

In November 2023, the band announced their second reunion and shared a new single, "Crazy Again". The song is lifted from their sixth album, Real Power, which was announced simultaneously and subsequently released on March 22, 2024.

In an interview with the BBC in March 2024, Ditto talked about how she invited Howdeshell when she was struggling to record her second solo album with Rick Rubin at his studio in Hawaii. Working together, the album progressed into a Gossip record, and after a hiatus due to the COVID-19 pandemic, the trio of Ditto, Howdeshell, and Blilie completed Real Power, their first album in twelve years.

The same year, Gossip embarked on a European and North America tour, including headlining at the Woodsies stage at Glastonbury.

== Musical style ==
The band's style has been described as "a soul or gospel" voice with "a sort of funky punk soundtrack". Members of Gossip have stated a liking for rock bands like the Birthday Party, Siouxsie and the Banshees, Nirvana, and the Raincoats, but also for other genres such as dance and hip hop.

== Band members ==
Current members

- Beth Ditto – vocals, piano (1999–2016, 2019–2020, 2023–present)
- Nathan "Brace Paine" Howdeshell – guitar, bass, keyboards (1999–2016, 2019–2020, 2023–present)
- Hannah Blilie – drums (2004–2016, 2019–2020, 2023–present)

Current touring musicians

- Ted Kwo – bass (2024–present)
- Bijoux Cone – keyboards, guitar (2024–present)

Past members

- Kathy Mendonça – drums (1999–2003, 2020)

Former touring musicians

- Christopher Sutton – bass (2009–2013, 2019–2020)
- Gregg Foreman – keyboards (2012–2013, 2019–2020)

== Discography ==
- That's Not What I Heard (2001)
- Movement (2003)
- Standing in the Way of Control (2006)
- Music for Men (2009)
- A Joyful Noise (2012)
- Real Power (2024)

== Awards ==
- 2010: nominated for a GLAAD Media Award for "Outstanding Music Artist" for their album Music for Men during the 21st GLAAD Media Awards.
- June 18, 2012, the single "Move in the Right Direction" was named BBC Radio 2's Record of The Week.

ECHO Awards for Gossip
Year	Nominee / work	Award	Result
2010	"Heavy Cross"	Best International Hit	Nominated
2010	Themselves	Best International Newcomer	Nominated
2010	Themselves	Best International Group	Nominated
2012	Themselves	Best International Group	Nominated

Hungarian Music Awards for Gossip
Year	Nominee / work	Award	Result
2010	Music for Men	Alternative Music Album of the Year	Nominated
2013	A Joyful Noise	Alternative Music Album of the Year	Won

Mojo Awards for Gossip
Year	Nominee / work	Award	Result
2007	"Standing in the Way of Control"	Song of the Year	Nominated

MTV Europe Music Awards for Gossip
Year	Nominee / work	Award	Result
2010	Themselves	Best Alternative	Nominated

PLUG Awards for Gossip
Year	Nominee / work	Award	Result
2007	"Standing in the Way of Control"	Song of the Year	Nominated

Žebřík Music Awards for Gossip
Year	Nominee / work	Award	Result
2009	Themselves	Best International Discovery	Nominated
