= Hannah Blilie =

American musician

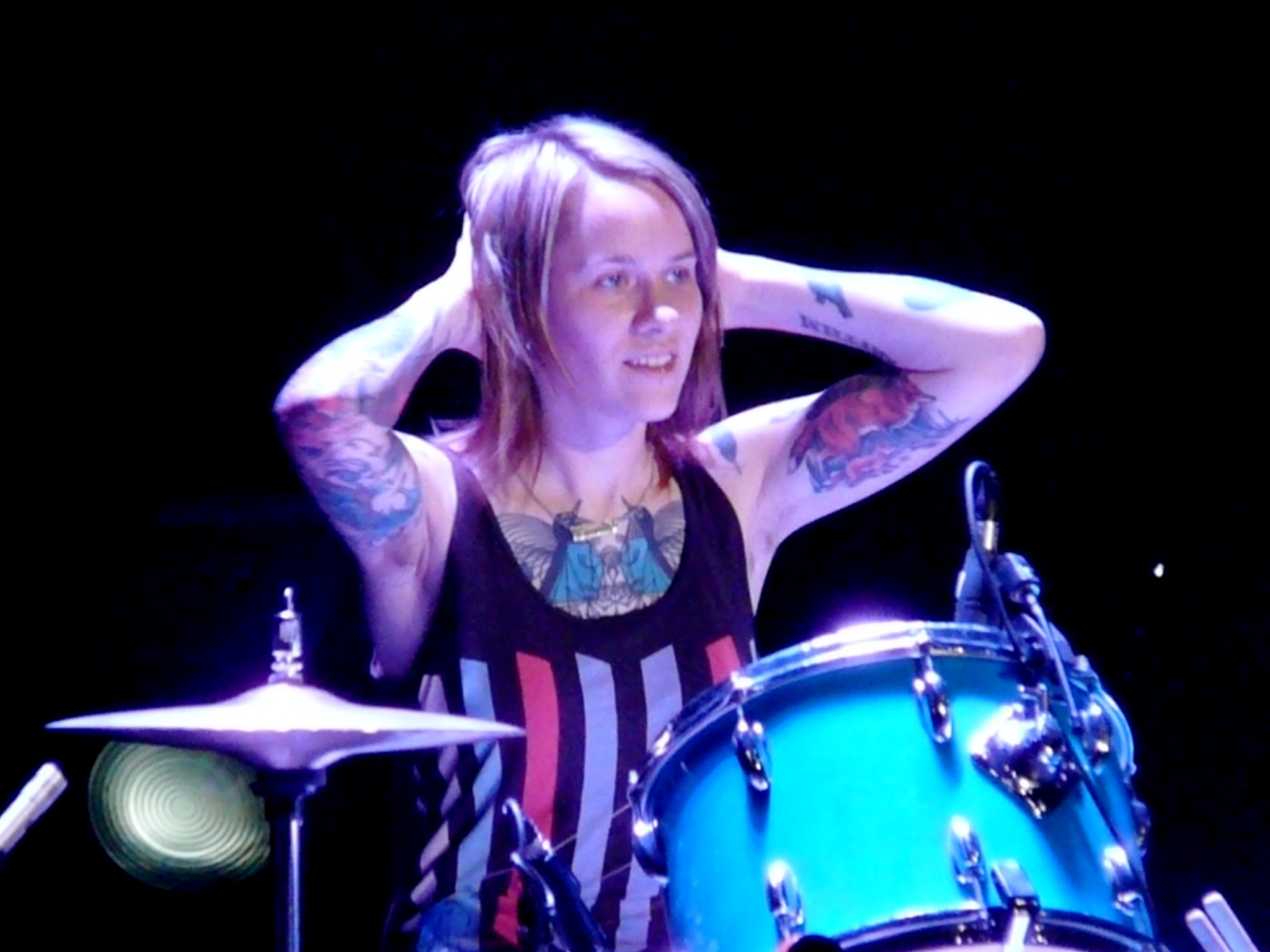
Blilie playing with Gossip in 2008

Hannah Blilie (born June 10, 1981) is an American musician who is the drummer of the American band Gossip and formerly Chanti Darling and Shoplifting. She has also performed with Sarah Dougher, Chromatics, Stiletto, Mr Yuk, The Lumpies, Vade, The Vogue, and Soiled Doves. Her twin brother, Jordan Blilie, is one of the two lead vocalists of The Blood Brothers. A photo of Blilie is featured on the cover artwork for the Gossip's fourth studio album Music for Men.

In 2004, Blilie replaced Kathy Mendonca as the drummer of Gossip, and her drumming appears on their LP Standing in the Way of Control (2006). She also plays on the Gossip album Live in Liverpool.
