= Beth Ditto =

American singer

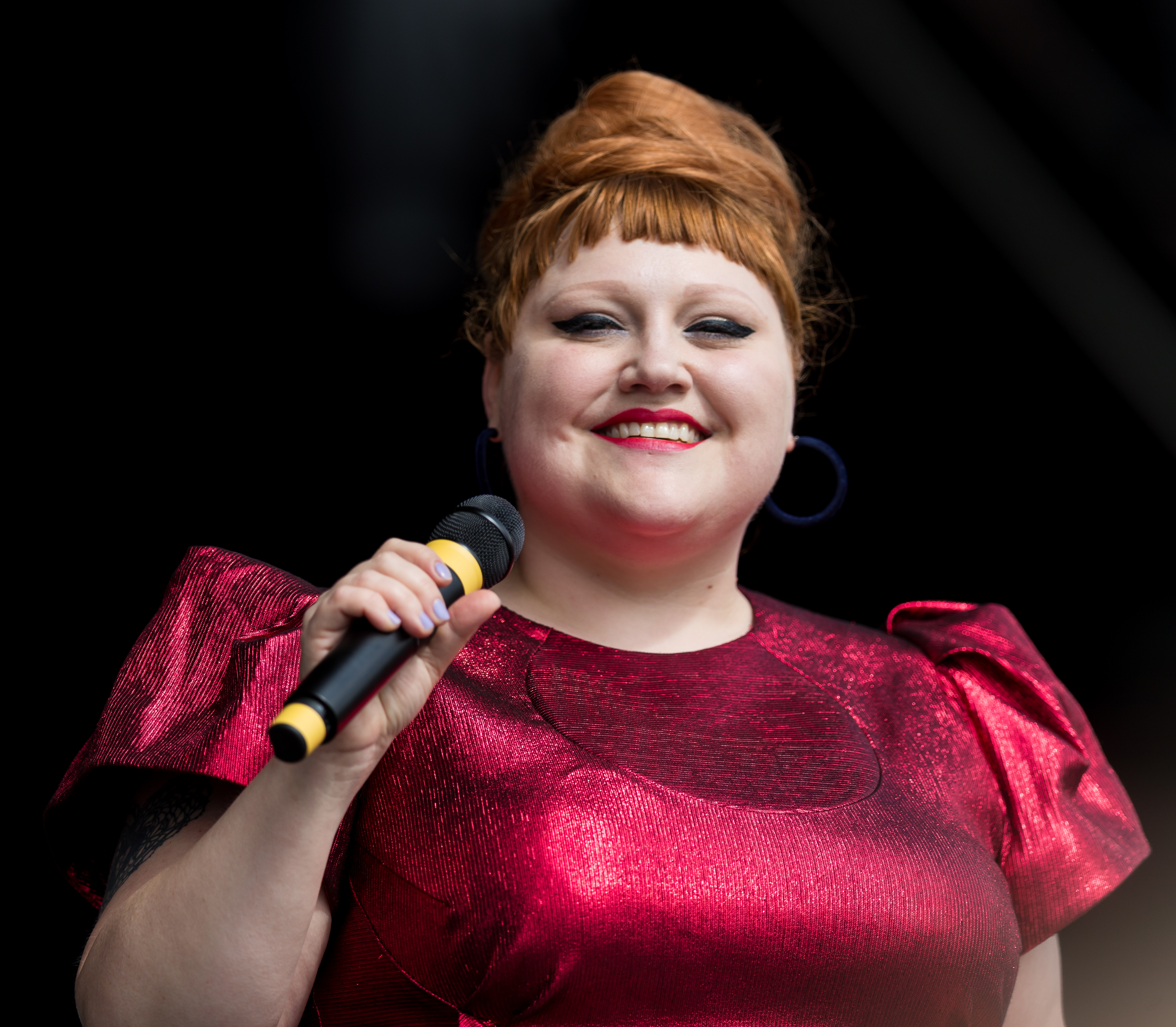
- Ditto performing in 2018

Background information
- Born: Mary Beth Patterson; February 19, 1981 (age 45); Searcy, Arkansas, U.S.
- Origin: Judsonia, Arkansas, U.S.
- Genres: Indie rock, post-punk, synthpop
- Occupations: Singer; songwriter; actress
- Years active: 1999–present (singer); 2016–present (actress)
- Label: Virgin

Mary Beth Patterson (born February 19, 1981), known by her stage name Beth Ditto, is an American singer, songwriter, actress, and radio presenter most notable for her work with the indie rock band Gossip. Her voice has been compared to Etta James, Janis Joplin, and Tina Turner. She disbanded Gossip to pursue a career in fashion, and has since started a solo career. In 2022, she portrayed country singer Gigi Roman on the Fox drama series Monarch, and two years later, Gossip reformed.

== Life and career ==
Ditto grew up in a poor family in Arkansas in the southern United States, with her mother, various stepfathers, and six siblings – two older brothers, an older sister, two younger brothers and a younger sister. She grew up in the Southern Baptist and Pentecostal churches, but is now an atheist. At age 13, she moved out of her mother's house and went to live with her aunt. She moved to Olympia, Washington in 1999; then to Portland, Oregon in 2003, where she lived as of 2014. At 18, she became aware of bands like Nirvana, Pearl Jam, The Raincoats and Siouxsie and the Banshees.

She fronted the band Gossip from its formation in 1999 until its dissolution in 2016. In addition, she has been involved in other musical projects. In 2008, she contributed vocals to the Crisis charity single "Consequences", a collaboration between various artists. In 2009, she sang on Simian Mobile Disco's track "Cruel Intentions" for their album of collaborations Temporary Pleasure. In 2011, she released her own 4-track Beth Ditto EP, produced by James Ford and Jas Shaw of Simian Mobile Disco, on the re-launched Deconstruction Records. She sang on Blondie's "A Rose by Any Name" from their 2013 album Ghosts of Download. Harrod Horatia, writing in The Telegraph, has said, "Where the stripped-down three-piece Gossip play propulsive, garage band blues, Ditto's own stuff is melancholic, soulful dance music, inspired by 'Eighties disco soul jams' that she loves, and the up-tempo pop-R&B of I Wanna Dance With Somebody-era Whitney Houston."

Ditto, who is openly queer, is well known for her outspoken support of lesbian, gay, bisexual, and transgender (LGBT), and feminist causes. She has been an advocate for large women being body-positive and has been regularly photographed as an editorial model. She is known for her stage dances and her unique and revealing image. She classes herself as a punk, and thus neither uses deodorant nor shaves under her armpits, having once remarked, "I think punks usually smell." She has cited Cyndi Lauper and Boy George as overall influences and Grace Jones and Peggy Moffitt as her beauty icons. She also stated: "Artists I love, like Siouxsie Sioux and Patti Smith, have such radically different ways of embodying femininity, but they're both amazing punk women. The true heart of feminism isn't about meeting other people's expectations around your body or your gender." She considers her favorite song to be "Oh Bondage Up Yours!" by X-Ray Spex.

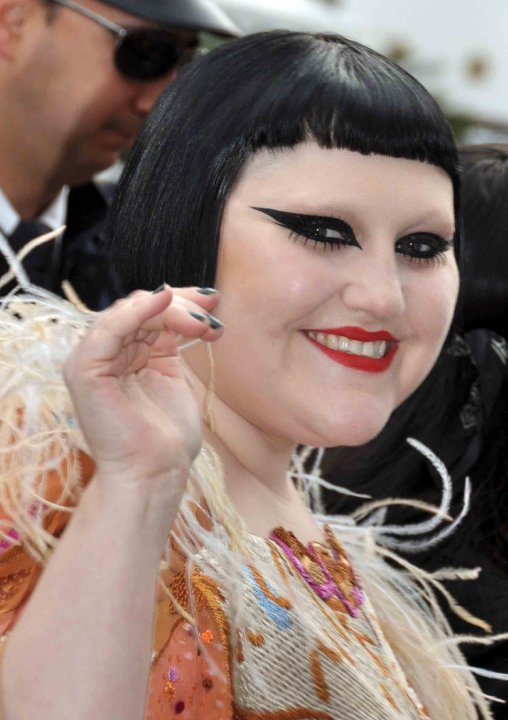
Ditto at the 2010 Cannes Film Festival

She courted mild controversy in 2006 when she claimed to have eaten squirrels as a child.

In 2007–2008, Ditto contributed a fortnightly advice column on body image to The Guardian newspaper entitled 'What would Beth Ditto do?'.

In 2007 she was featured posed nude on the front cover of music magazine NME.Naked Beth Ditto NME cover up for award Germaine Greer, writing in The Guardian, said the magazine had "enough courage to put the coolest woman on the planet on the cover" whilst acknowledging its limits. Greer also praised Ditto for her motives, saying her "intention is to force acceptance of her body type, 5 ft [1.5 m] tall and 15 stone [210 lb; 95 kg], and by this strategy to challenge the conventional imagery of women". In February 2009 bi-annual British style magazine Love featured Ditto posed nude on the front cover of its premiere issue, with prominent public advertising. Emily Hill, writing in The Guardian, was cynical of Love magazine's intentions, writing that "Beth Ditto on Love magazine is not evidence of fashion's new acceptance, but a diversion before emaciated normality returns".

Ditto launched her first plus-size collection for women's clothing retailer Evans on July 9, 2009, in collaboration with head of design Lisa Marie Peacock. Ditto provided sketches and drew inspiration from her favourite vintage and charity shop clothes as well as bands like Blondie, The Slits and Grace Jones, and Art Deco movements. Her second collection for Evans launched in 2010 with just over 20 individual items. Marianne Kirby, writing in The Guardian, said the "collection struck a nerve with its iconic pieces" and that it was an "international success".

She opened (modeled) and closed the Jean Paul Gaultier spring 2011 fashion show during Paris Fashion Week in October 2010.

In June 2012 Ditto collaborated with MAC Cosmetics to create a make up collection.

Ditto released her memoir in 2012 called Coal to Diamonds, which she co-wrote with Michelle Tea. It was positively reviewed in The Guardian and NME.

Ditto confirmed the split of the band Gossip to pursue a career in fashion and her solo career in 2016.

In 2018, Ditto made her film acting debut in Gus Van Sant's Don't Worry, He Won't Get Far on Foot. The following year she was cast in On Becoming a God in Central Florida, a Showtime series starring Kirsten Dunst.

In 2025, Ditto joined BBC Radio 6 Music to be a regular guest for Nick Grimshaw's show. In December of that year, she began presenting Indie Forever Disco, making a playlist of indie music. In February 2026, Radio 6 Music announced that Ditto would replace Huey Morgan on Saturday mornings from 4 April 2026.

== Personal life ==
In July 2013, Ditto married her girlfriend and best friend since she was 18, Kristin Ogata, in Maui, Hawaii. Both were outfitted entirely in white for the occasion; Ditto wore a gown by Jean Paul Gaultier and went barefoot while Ogata wore a jacket, a shirt, shorts, and shoes.

In December 2014, seventeen months after the two first walked down the aisle in a wedding, the couple legally married in their home state of Oregon, having to wait until same-sex marriage became legal there to make their marriage official.

In an interview in March 2018, Ditto announced that she and her wife had split and she was dating musician Ted Kwo. Earlier that month, she addressed how her relationship with Kwo, who is an openly transgender man, has urged her to consider the privileges of being perceived as a straight woman. In particular, she spoke about the sharp difference in how she was treated when she was with Ogata: "I was always really afraid, I was always really protective. Straight privilege is real."

== Books ==
=== Books by Ditto ===
- Coal to Diamonds: A Memoir Co-written with Michelle Tea.
  - New York, NY: Spiegel & Grau, 2012. ISBN 978-0385525916. Hardback.
  - London: Simon & Schuster UK, 2012. ISBN 978-1847372161. Hardback.
  - London: Simon & Schuster UK, 2013. ISBN 978-1847392466. Paperback.

=== Books with contributions by Ditto ===
- Riot Grrrl: Revolution Girl Style Now! by Nadine Monem. London: Black Dog Publishing, 2007. ISBN 978-1-906155-01-8. Ditto contributes an introduction.

== Discography ==
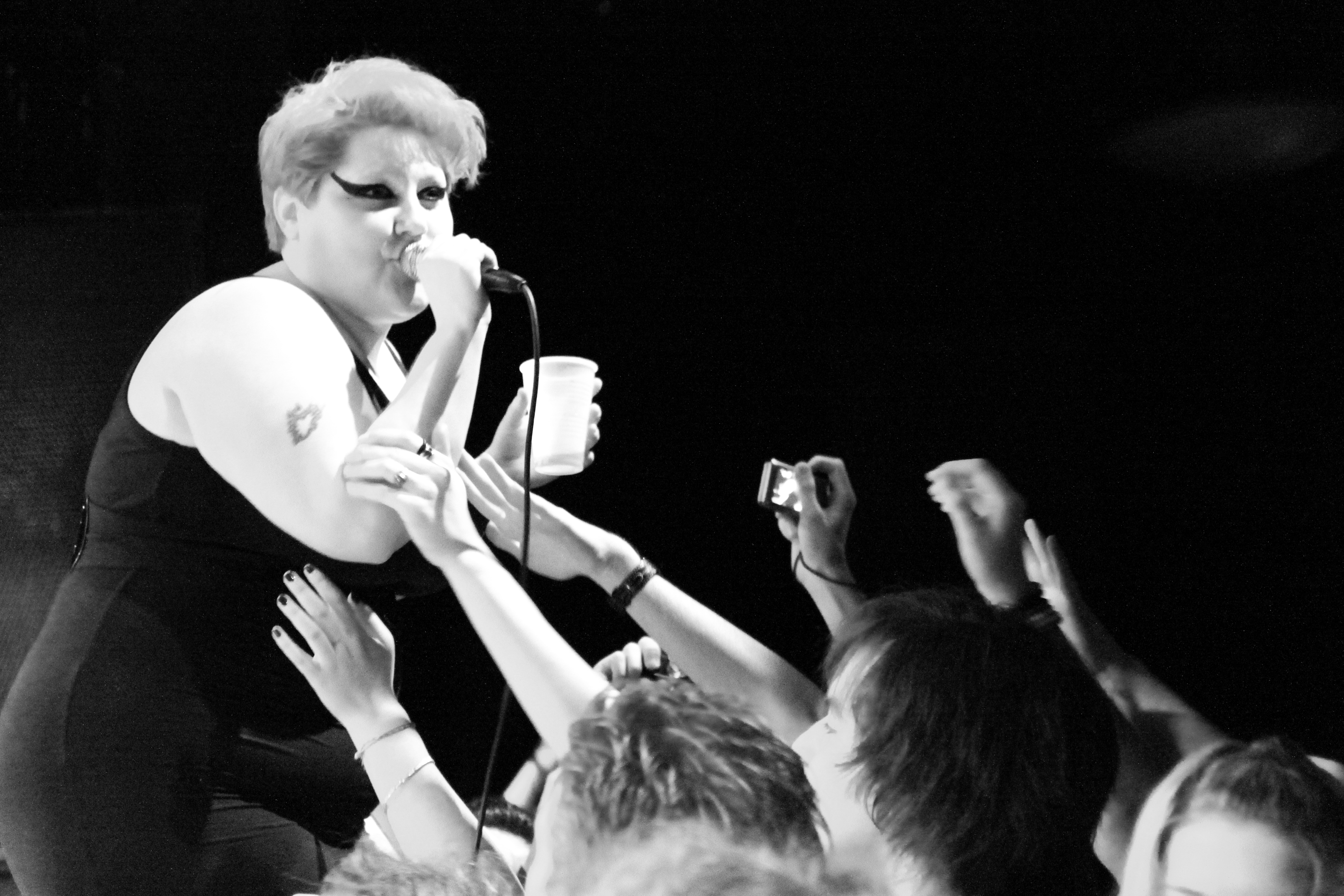
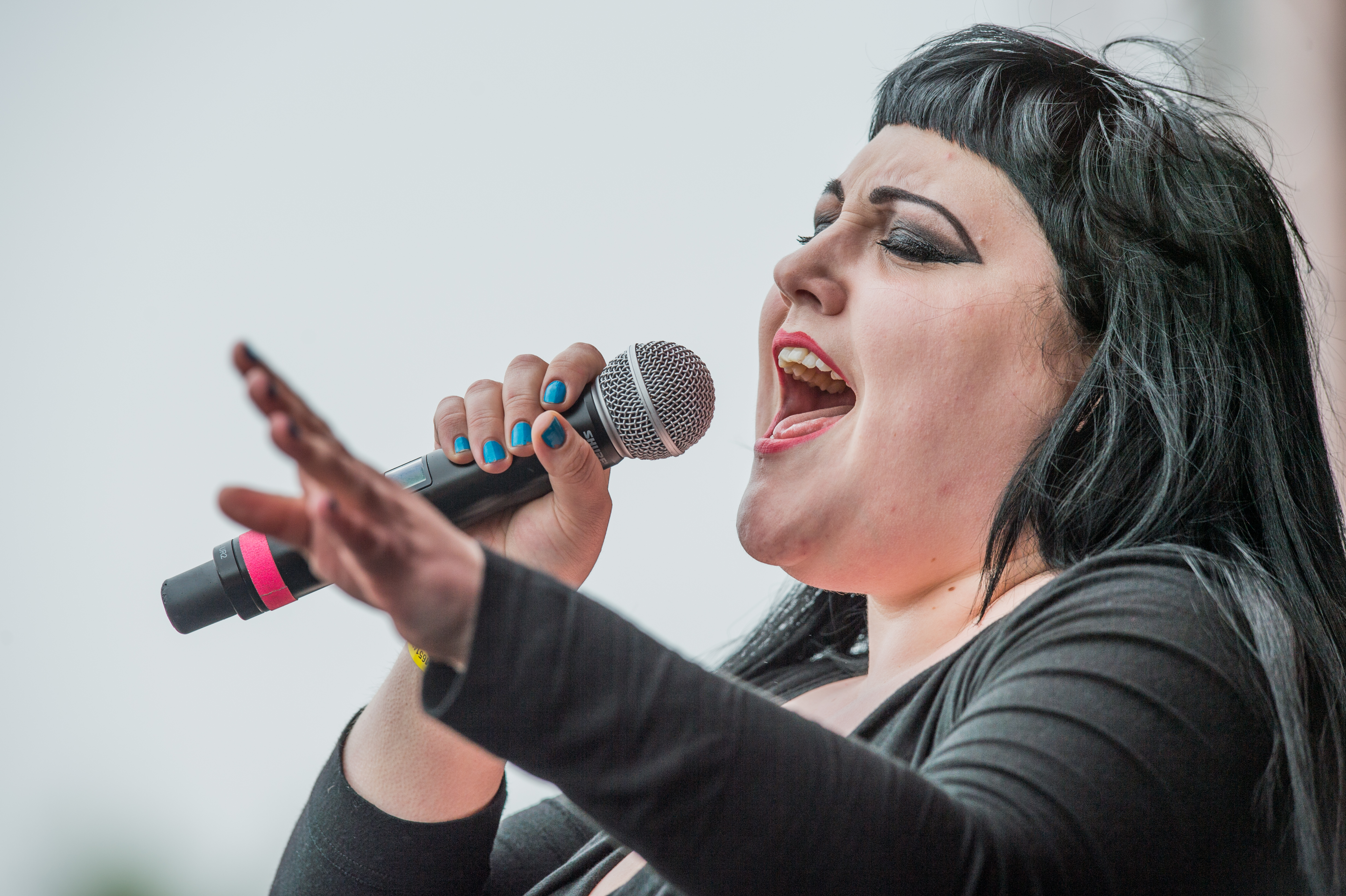
Ditto performing with Gossip

=== Albums ===
List of albums, with selected peak chart positions
Title	Year	Peak positions					
Title	Year	AUS	BEL	FRA	ITA	SWI	UK
Fake Sugar	2017	89	51	24	80	11	47

=== Extended plays ===
List of EPs, with selected peak chart positions
Title	Year	Peak positions					
Title	Year	US Dance	AUS	FRA	GER	SWI	UK
EP	2011	9	86	67	78	45	47

=== Singles ===
==== As lead artist ====
List of singles as lead artist, with selected peak chart positions
Title	Year	Peak positions					Album
Title	Year	BEL	FRA	GER	SWI	UK	Album
"Temptation" (with Jarvis Cocker)	2008	—	—	—	—	148	Non-album single (charity single)
"I Wrote the Book"	2011	6	89	24	59	—	EP
"Fire"	2017	—	—	—	—	—	Fake Sugar

==== As featured artist ====
List of singles as featured artist, with selected peak chart positions
Title	Year	Peak positions			Album
Title	Year	BEL	GER	UK	Album
"Consequences" (Crisis featuring Beth Ditto, Paul Weller, The Enemy, Supergrass and many more)	2008	—	—	88	Non-album single (charity single)
"Cruel Intentions" (Simian Mobile Disco featuring Beth Ditto)	2010	—	—	142	Temporary Pleasure
"A Rose by Any Name" (Blondie featuring Beth Ditto)	2013	—	—	—	Ghosts of Download
"Running Low" (Netsky featuring Beth Ditto)	2014	1	100	80	Non-album single
"Me in Your Head" (Hot Chip featuring Beth Ditto)	2026	—	—	—	A Long Way from Kansas

=== Songs performed on Monarch ===
- "Family Tradition" (with Joshua Sasse, Anna Friel and Iñigo Pascual)
- "How Do I Live" (with Anna Friel)
- "The Card You Gamble" (with Anna Friel)
- "Juice"
- "God Knows"
- "Always on My Mind" (with Trace Adkins)

== Filmography ==
Year	Title	Role	Notes
2016	Nocturnal Animals	TV Woman Voice No. 2	
2018	Don't Worry, He Won't Get Far on Foot	Reba	
2019	On Becoming a God in Central Florida	Bets Gomes	Main cast
2022	Monarch	Gigi Taylor-Roman	Main cast
2024	Never Mind the Buzzcocks	Herself	Guest Team Captain

== Awards and nominations ==
Award	Year	Nominee(s)	Category	Result	Ref.
Bambi Awards	2010	Gossip	International Pop	Won	
Echo Music Prize	2010	"Heavy Cross"	Hit of the Year	Nominated	
Echo Music Prize	2010	Gossip	Best International Newcomer	Nominated	
Echo Music Prize	2010	Gossip	Best International Group	Nominated	
Echo Music Prize	2013	Gossip	Best International Group	Nominated	
GLAAD Media Awards	2002	That's Not What I Heard	Outstanding Music Artist	Nominated	
GLAAD Media Awards	2010	Music for Men	Outstanding Music Artist	Nominated	
GLAAD Media Awards	2013	A Joyful Noise	Outstanding Music Artist	Nominated	
Gay Music Chart Awards	2017	"In and Out"	Best Lyric Video	Nominated	
Glamour Awards	2008	Herself	International Musician	Won	
Glamour Awards	2024	Herself	International Talent	Won	
Hungarian Music Awards	2010	Music for Men	Alternative Music Album of the Year	Nominated	
Hungarian Music Awards	2013	A Joyful Noise	Alternative Music Album of the Year	Won	
Kulturnews Awards	2009	Music for Men	Best Album	Won	
MTV Europe Music Awards	2010	Gossip	Best Alternative	Nominated	
Mojo Awards	2007	"Standing in the Way of Control"	Song of the Year	Nominated	
NME Awards	2007	Herself	Sexiest Woman	Nominated	
NME's Cool List	2006	Herself	The Coolest Person	Won	
NRJ Music Awards	2011	Gossip	International Revelation of the Year	Nominated	
PLUG Awards	2007	Herself	Female Artist of the Year	Nominated	
PLUG Awards	2007	"Standing in the Way of Control"	Song of the Year	Nominated	
Stonewall Awards	2007	Herself	Hero of the Year	Nominated	
Stonewall Awards	2009	Herself	Entertainer of the Year	Nominated	
UK Festival Awards	2007	Gossip	Festival Rock Act	Nominated	
UK Festival Awards	2007	Herself	Most Memorable Moment	Nominated	
UK Festival Awards	2007	"Standing in the Way of Control"	Anthem of the Summer	Nominated	
UK Festival Awards	2009	Herself	Festival Fitty of the Year - Girls	Nominated	
Virgin Media Music Awards	2007	Herself	Legend of the Year	Nominated	
Vodafone Live Music Awards	2007	Gossip	Live Impact	Won	
Vodafone Live Music Awards	2007	Gossip	XFM Live Breakthrough Act	Nominated	
Žebřík Music Awards	2009	Gossip	Best International Discovery	Nominated	
