= Hotshot =

Hotshot or Hotshots or Hot Shot or Hot Shots may refer to:

- Heated shot, a heated projectile fired from a cannon
- Less than truckload shipping, industry jargon for smaller sized equipment that can move freight faster than tractor-trailers
- Hot shot (or hot load), a lethal injection of heroin or another opiate
- Interagency hotshot crew, an elite team of wildland firefighters

== Books ==
- Hotshot, in the Hero Hotline comic series
- Hotshot, in the Starriors comic and toy line

== Film and TV ==
=== Film ===
- Hotshot (film), 1987 American soccer film
- Hotshots, 1984 Philippines film with Aga Muhlach, Gary Valenciano, Eula Valdez
- Hot Shots (1956 film), a 1956 film starring The Bowery Boys
- Hot Shots!, a 1991 comedy film starring Charlie Sheen
- Hot Shots! Part Deux, a 1993 sequel to the 1991 film

=== Television ===
- Hot Shot (TV series), a 2008 Taiwanese drama Featuring Wu Chun, Show Luo & Jerry Yan
- Hot Shots (American TV series), an American shooting sports series
- Hot Shots (Canadian TV series), a Canadian drama series airing in 1986
- "Hot Shots" (The Wire), a 2003 episode of HBO's The Wire

== Games ==
- Hot Shots Golf (series), the North American name of the video game franchise Everybody's Golf
- HotShot (video game)

== Music ==
- Hotshot (band) (핫샷) 2014-2021, a South Korean boy band
- Hotshot (1980s-2000s band), band including Mike Pont
- The Hotshots, a 1970s UK male vocal group, performers of the song Snoopy vs. the Red Baron
- Hotshots, a CD:UK British music programme series

=== Albums ===
- Hot Shot (Karen Young album), a 1978 disco/pop album by American singer Karen Young
- Hot Shot (Shaggy album), a 2000 album by Shaggy
- Hot Shots (album), a 1979 album by Canadian band Trooper
- Hot Shots II, a 2001 album by The Beta Band

=== Songs ===
- "Hot Shot" (Barry Blue song), a 1974 song by Barry Blue and Lynsey de Paul
- "Hot Shot" (Karen Young song), a 1978 song by Karen Young
- "Hot Shot" (Cliff Richard song), a 1979 song by Cliff Richard from Rock 'n' Roll Juvenile
- "Hot Shot", a 1979 song by Tatsuro Yamashita from Moonglow (Tatsuro Yamashita album)
- "Hot Shot", a 1985 song by Jimmy Cliff from Cliff Hanger
- "Hot Shot", a 2003 song by Krokus from Rock the Block

== Sports ==
- Arizona Hotshots, a professional American football team based in Tempe, Arizona
- Hotshot (basketball), a basketball shooting game
- Houston Hotshots, an indoor soccer team in Houston, Texas
- Southern Hotshots, an Australian field hockey team
- West Coast Hotshots, a basketball team based in Bend, Oregon
- Talk 'N Text Tropang Texters, formerly Pepsi Hotshots, a Philippine basketball team

=== In professional wrestling ===
- Hotshot (strategy), short-term promotional strategy (of any of several kinds)
- Hotshot (throw), a style of throw
- Reverse hotshot, or reverse hangman, a style of attack

== Other uses ==
- Hot Shot (Transformers), the name of several robot superhero characters in the Transformers robot superhero franchise.
- Hot Shots (dance companies), a collective name for two Swedish dance companies that specialize in African American dances
- Hot Shot Hamish, a character in a British football-themed comic strips
- Hot Shot!, the 2009–10 FIRST Tech Challenge competition
- Ford Hot Shots, a curling competition
- Hot Shot, the brand name for a line of hot water makers made by Sunbeam Products
- Hot Shot, the brand name for an insecticide using Lambda-cyhalothrin
- Hot shot wind tunnel, for hypersonic testing
- Hotshot (railway), rail terminology for some high-priority trains
- Hotshot crew, a firefighting crew specially trained in wildland firefighting
  - Granite Mountain Hotshots, a fire crew in the Prescott, Arizona Fire Department
- Pantech Hotshot, a 3G device manufactured for Verizon
- Okay Hot-Shot, Okay! (1963), a painting by Roy Lichtenstein
- Hotshot Charlie, cartoon series by George Wunder
- Hotshot Eastbound (1956), photo by O. Winston Link
- Wasp dope, sometimes known as hot shots.
