= No Exit (song) =

Single by Blondie featuring Coolio and the Loud Allstars

from the album No Exit
- Released: October 22, 1999
- Recorded: 1998
- Genre: Rap rock
- Length: 4:18
- Label: Beyond
- Songwriters: Deborah Harry; Chris Stein; Jimmy Destri; Coolio; Romy Ashby
- Producer: Craig Leon

Blondie featuring Coolio and the Loud Allstars singles chronology
| "Nothing Is Real but the Girl" (1999) | "No Exit" (1999) | "Good Boys" (2003) |

Audio sample
- No Exit: file; help

Music video
- "No Exit" on YouTube

"No Exit" is a song by the American new wave band Blondie. It was the title track from their seventh studio album in 1999 and was released as a single in Europe, but not the US.

== Overview ==
A "gothic hip hop" track, "No Exit" features rapper Coolio exchanging raps with Debbie Harry. It also uses an interpolation of Johann Sebastian Bach's "Toccata and Fugue in D minor" and Edvard Grieg's "In the Hall of the Mountain King".

The single was released in the UK as a special tour souvenir CD. The released CD contains remixes of "No Exit", "Maria", "Nothing Is Real but the Girl" and a cover of Karen Young's 1978 disco hit "Hot Shot".

A video was released for one of the "No Exit" remixes, which also featured rappers Inspectah Deck, U-God of Wu-Tang Clan, Havoc and Prodigy of Mobb Deep as "The Loud Allstars".

== Uses in other media ==
The Loud Allstar Rock Remix was featured in the 1999 film 200 Cigarettes. A music video for the song, featuring the band with Coolio and the other rap performers, was produced in conjunction with the release of the film.

== Track listing ==
All tracks are written by Debbie Harry, Chris Stein, Jimmy Destri, Coolio, Romy Ashby unless otherwise noted.

EU CD

1. "No Exit" (The Loud Rock remix radio version) - 4:26
2. "No Exit" (The Infamous Hip Rock version radio version) -3:21
3. "No Exit" (album version) - 4:19

UK Exclusive Tour Souvenir CD

1. "No Exit" (The Loud Rock remix radio version) - 4:26
2. "No Exit" (The Infamous Hip Rock version radio version) - 3:21
3. "Maria" (J & B mix) (Destri) - 4:51
4. "Maria" (Talvin Singh Rhythmic mix) (Destri) - 4:51
5. "Nothing Is Real but the Girl" (DT edit) (Destri) - 3:13
6. "Hot Shot" (Andrew Kahn, Kurt Borusiewicz) - 3:46

US 12" (promo only)

1. "No Exit" (The Loud Rock remix) radio version - 3:56
2. "No Exit" (AMA performance version) radio version - 4:26
3. "No Exit" (The Loud Rock remix) TV track - 5:12
4. "Who's Gonna Cry" (No Exit Pt. 2, the Infamous Hip Rock version) radio version - 3:21
5. "Who's Gonna Cry" (No Exit Pt. 2, the Infamous Hip Rock version) instrumental - 3:24
6. "Maria (Talvin Singh Rhythmic radio edit) (Destri) - 4:39
