= Baygon =

Pesticide brand

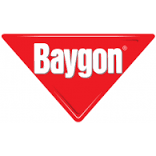

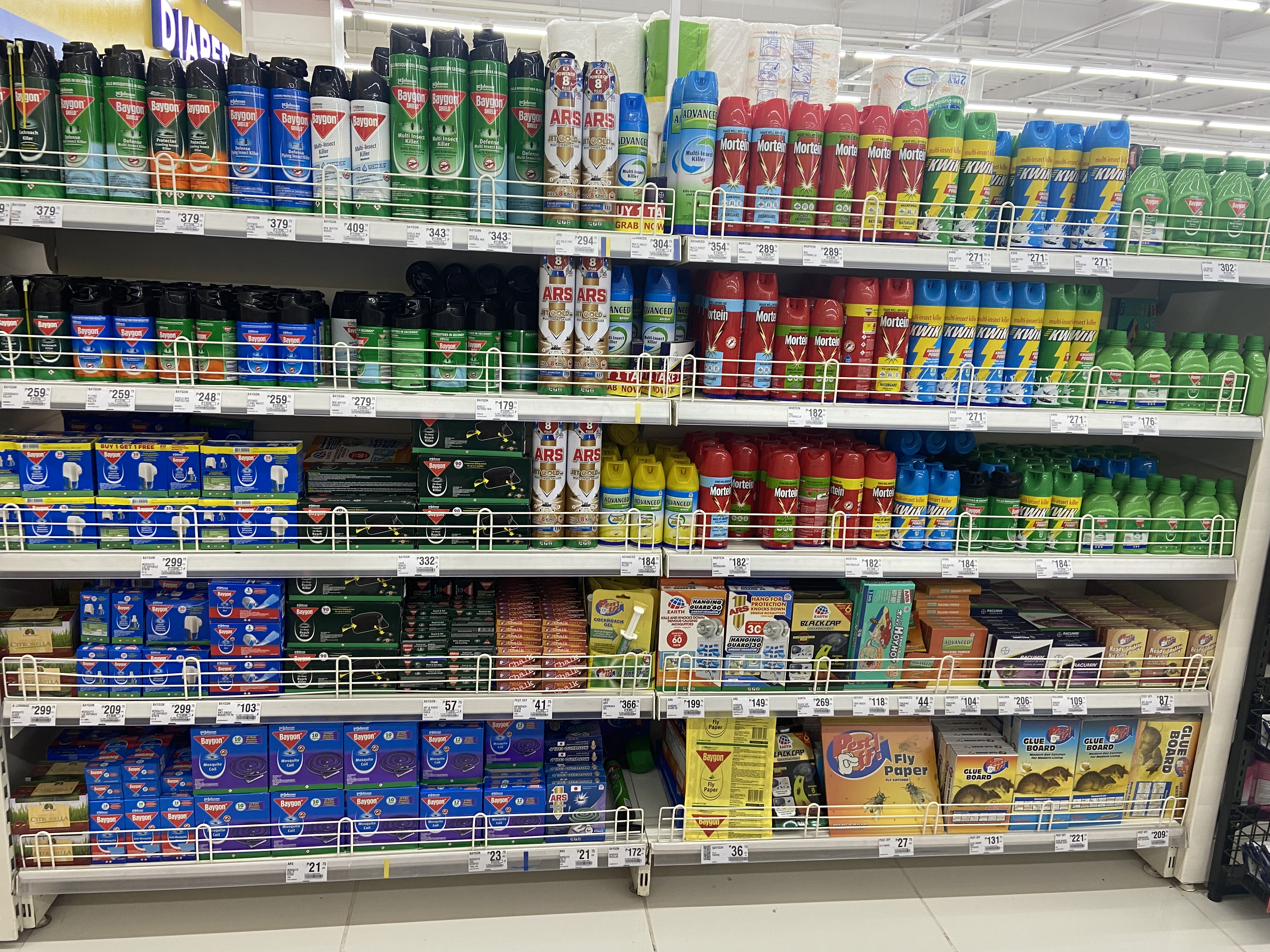
- Plethora of Baygon products (left and far-right), along with their competitors (center and right)
- Product type: Pesticide
- Current owner: S. C. Johnson & Son
- Introduced: 1967
- Related brands: Raid
- Previous owners: Bayer
- Tagline: Various

Baygon is a pesticide brand produced by S. C. Johnson & Son. It is an insecticide used for extermination and control of household pests such as crickets, roaches, ants, carpenter ants, spiders, silverfish and mosquitoes. In 1975, Baygon introduced Australia's first surface spray for killing cockroaches, ticks and other crawling insects.

Baygon was introduced by the German chemical manufacturer Bayer in 1967. In 2003, Bayer sold the brand to S. C. Johnson & Son. As part of the agreement, the active ingredients used in the pesticides are still manufactured by Bayer and supplied non-exclusively to SC Johnson.

== Composition ==
Baygon products contain the pyrethroids cyfluthrin, transfluthrin, cypermethrin, prallethrin and the carbamate propoxur and organophosphorus chlorpyrifos, as active ingredients. In the concentrations used in consumer product insecticides, pyrethroids may also have insect repellent properties and are generally harmless to human beings in low doses but can harm sensitive individuals. If ingested in sufficient quantities, they can lead to a variety of ill effects, including tremors, dyspnea, and paralysis.

The active biocide in Baygon, prallethrin, while considered effective as a mosquito repellent, has been flagged by the WHO and in other studies, as "highly toxic" to honeybees and fish.
