= Mosquito coil =

Incense coil designed to repel mosquitoes

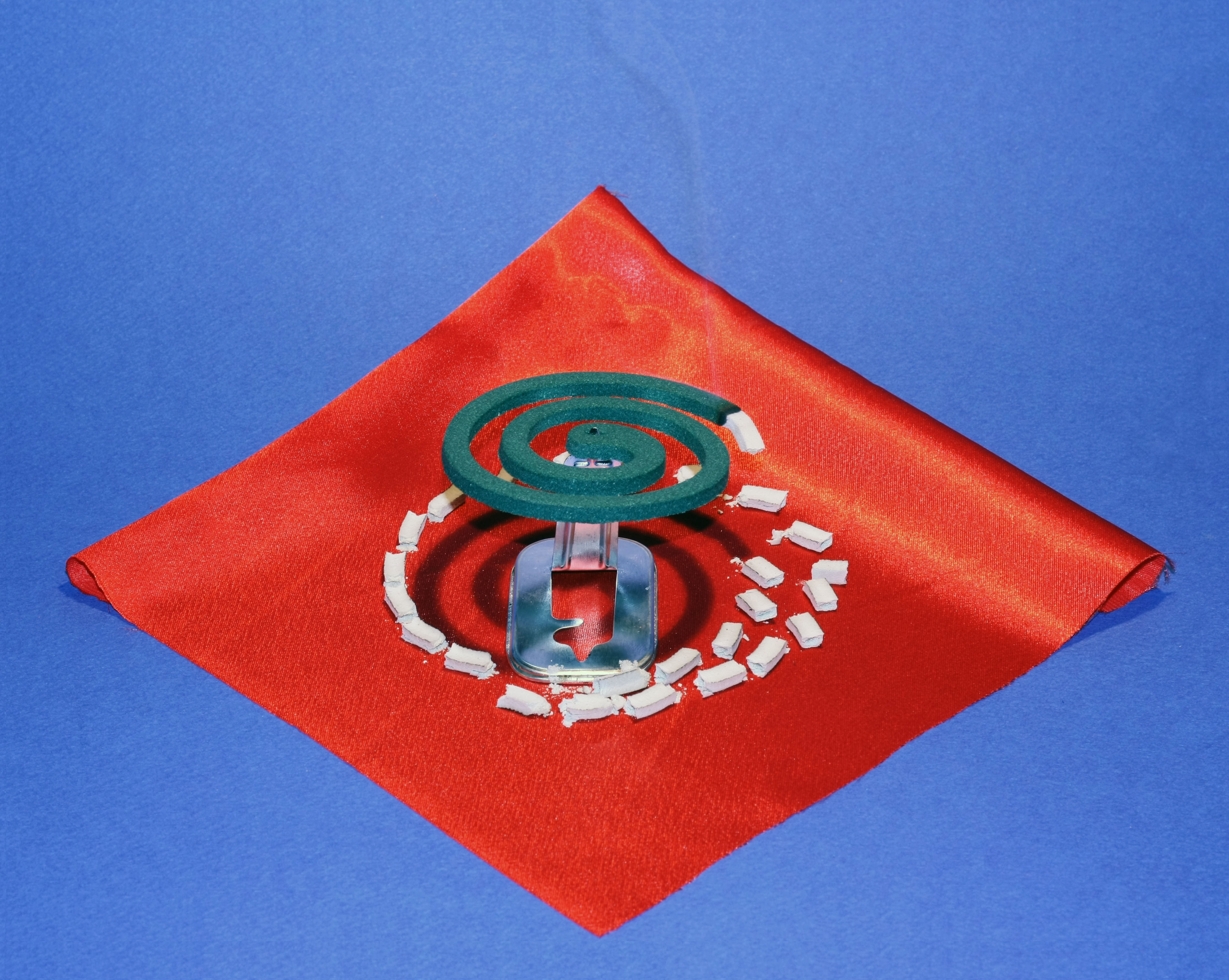
Mosquito coil

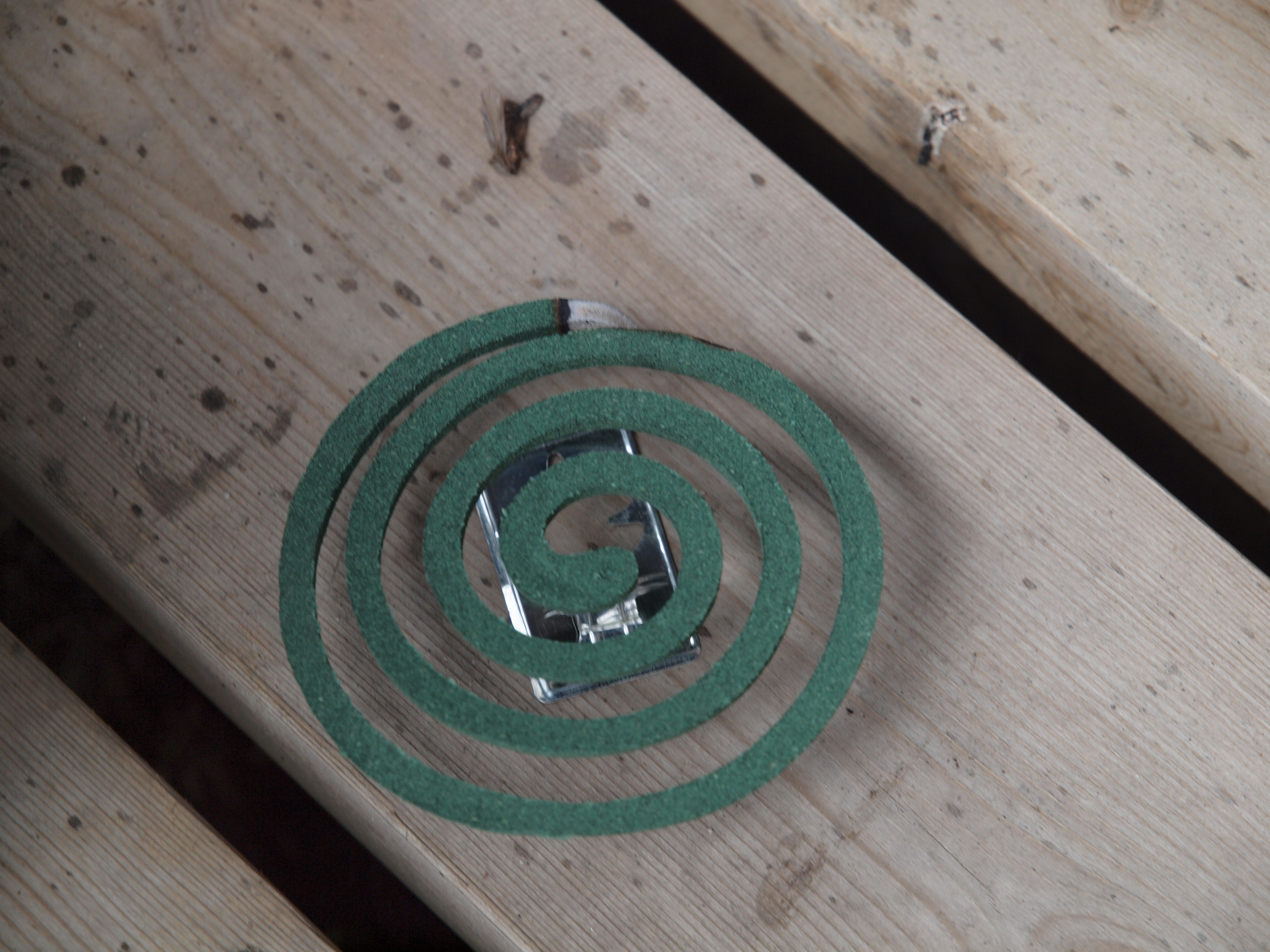
Mosquito coil

A mosquito coil is a mosquito-repelling incense, usually made into a spiral, and typically made using dried paste of pyrethrum powder. The coil is usually held at the center of the spiral, suspending it in the air, or wedged by two pieces of fireproof netting to allow continuous smoldering. Burning usually begins at the outer end of the spiral and progresses slowly toward the center of the spiral, producing a mosquito-repellent smoke. A typical mosquito coil measures around 15 centimetres (6 in) in diameter and lasts around seven to twelve hours. Mosquito coils are widely used in Asia, Africa, South America, Canada, Mexico and Australia.

== Invention ==
Pyrethrum is an insecticide naturally obtained from the drying of plants of the genus Tanacetum and has been used for centuries as a repellent in Persia and Europe.

In the early 19th century, the Austrian Johann Zacherl discovered that the population of the Caucasus used the dried flowers of Chrysanthemum to repel insects. After founding an import-export company in Tbilisi in 1842, he returned to Vienna in 1854 where he soon after opened a factory to produce a "deadly tincture for insects" called Zacherlin, which was sold worldwide.

In 1862, Giovanni Battista Zampironi founded a pharmaceutical laboratory in Mestre for the production of "piroconofobo" ("a fumigating cone that scares away [mosquitoes]"), later renamed fidibus insettifugo (a fidibus was a paper spill used in the 19th century to light pipes and cigars). Zampironi's trapezoidal cones (35 mm long and weighing 2.5 grams) were made with a formula composed of 50% pyrethrum powder, 35% potassium nitrate for combustion, and 15% binders and thickeners (including marshmallow root and tragacanth gum). The widespread use and commercial success of the product also led to the use of the eponym "zampirone".

The transition to the current spiral shape can be traced to the late 19th century in Japan, where pyrethrum powder (first imported from the United States in 1886) was mixed with sawdust and burned to repel mosquitoes. The Japanese entrepreneur Eiichiro Ueyama produced incense sticks mixed with starch powders, dried mandarin peels, and pyrethrum, which burned for about 40 minutes. In 1895, his wife Yuki (inspired by the sight of a coiled snake) suggested that he make the sticks thicker and longer-lasting by coiling them into a spiral. This shape allows more material to be concentrated per unit of volume, maintaining combustion for a longer time than a classic stick. In 1902, after a series of trials and errors, a spiral-shaped incense-like product was perfected. It was made by cutting strips of incense and then manually winding them. This method was used until 1957, when a die-cutting machine was invented, enabling mass production through direct molding of the material. After World War II, his company, Dainihon Jochugiku Co. Ltd, established collaborations and licensed the patent in various countries, including China and Thailand, for the production of specific mosquito repellent products based on local needs.

== Ingredients ==
Active ingredients found in mosquito coils may include:

- Pyrethrum: a natural, powdered material from a kind of chrysanthemum plant.
- Pyrethrins: an extract of the insecticidal chemicals in pyrethrum.
- Allethrin: sometimes d-trans-allethrin, the first synthetic pyrethroid.
- Esbiothrin: a form of allethrin.
- Dimefluthrin: a novel fluorinated pyrethroid pesticide.
- Meperfluthrin: a fluorinated pyrethroid ester
- Metofluthrin: a fluorinated pyrethroid insecticide which is highly effective against mosquitoes. Also used in most mosquito repellants like candles, patches and mini fans.
- Butylated hydroxytoluene (BHT): an optional additive used to prevent pyrethroid from oxidizing during burning.
- Piperonyl butoxide (PBO): an optional additive to improve the effectiveness of pyrethroid.
- N-Octyl bicycloheptene dicarboximide (MGK 264): an optional additive to improve the effectiveness of a pyrethroid.

== Disadvantages ==
Mosquito coils can be fire hazards. Their use has resulted in numerous accidental fires. In 1999, a fire in a South Korean three-story dormitory caused the death of 23 people when a mosquito coil was left unattended.

The strong smell from the smoke may also linger; permeating fabric and furniture.

The health risks of mosquito coils are still being researched with some studies highlighting connections with lung cancer and exposure to mosquito coil smoke. Coils sold in China and Malaysia were found to produce as much smoke PM_{2.5} as 75–137 burning cigarettes and formaldehyde emission levels in line with 51 burning cigarettes. Other studies in rats conclude that mosquito coils are not a significant health risk, although some organisms may experience temporary sensory irritation like that caused by smoke from the combustion of organic materials such as logs. In one study, rats were directly exposed to a coil's smoke for six hours a day, five days a week for thirteen weeks. They showed signs of sensory irritation from the high smoke concentration, but there were no adverse effects on other parts of the body. The study concluded that, with normal use, mosquito coils are unlikely to be a health risk.

== See also ==
- Mosquito trap
- Prallethrin
