= Catacombs Nightclub Philadelphia =

Gay nightclub in Philadelphia, Pennsylvania

Coordinates: 39.94880°N 75.16048°W

Logo for Catacombs Philadelphia

The Catacombs Nightclub was a gay after-hours club in Philadelphia that played underground dance music, a precursor to house music. Additionally, Catacombs was responsible for the creation of the dance music genre "Philly Classics". The club was a cultural center for music industry professionals and artists of diverse backgrounds in the early 1980s.

== History ==
Second Story, Philadelphia's premier nightclub, was located at 12th and Walnut Streets in Center City Philadelphia. Known to regulars as The Story, it was inspired by the vision of brothers Barry and Wayne Geftman. The Geftman brothers' original concept was to create a private, gay club with an environment featuring unique interiors, superior music and sound, and innovative lighting. Under the banner of Disco Design, LTD., Wayne oversaw most of the creative and technical aspects of the club, while Barry performed administrative duties including staffing and promotions.

Before Second Story was opened, Wayne and Barry had created their first nightclub, the Music Box. The club was one of the most popular spots at the Jersey Shore during summers in the 1970s. New York's Discoteckin magazine called it "a club worth leaving New York for".

The sound system was designed by Rosner Custom Sound and was installed by Rosner's lead engineer, Donald Carucci, known as an expert in the field of nightclub sound. The Music Box's sound system was unparalleled, and Wayne and DJ Frankie "Who" Sestito frequently turned the music up, which further cemented the club's popularity. With the success of the Music Box at the Jersey Shore, the Geftman brothers decided it was time to bring their concepts to Philadelphia with Second Story.

Second Story opened its doors on December 6, 1976, after three years of intense design. The facility was in a former church, and elements from the original building were utilized in its interior design. Rosner designed a state-of-the-art sound system, featuring components that, at the time, were rarely used in the nightclub environment. The light show was also designed under Barry's close scrutiny. The club opened as a private, gay nightclub. It changed to a more mainstream format after 13 months, which led to unprecedented success and to its reputation as "Philadelphia's Studio 54".

Although Second Story was a commercial success, Wayne's love of music compelled him to build another club—one that featured "hardcore" dance music, then popular in after-hours gay juice bars. Later, this style of music was recognized as the precursor to house music, and this music helped shape the dance genre Philly Classics.

The Geftman brothers opened Catacombs in the fall of 1978 in the basement of the 12th Street structure. The club typically opened on Saturdays at midnight, and often would not close until noon on Sunday. The first record played at Catacombs was "The Impossible Dream".

The sound system in Catacombs was the original system from the Music Box. Wayne updated the system by doubling the number of loudspeakers and amplifiers. Designed and installed by Donald Carucci, the modified system created a 360° field of sound, further enhanced by the club's low ceiling. The result was a sound system with crystal-clear music, in a room without dead spots.

Catacombs earned a reputation as a nationally recognized after-hours club, and it became known for being frequented by music-industry professionals from both Philadelphia and New York. Catacombs' most significant contribution to the music industry was its creation of the dance genre Philly Classics. Catacombs closed its doors in December 1986.

== Owners ==
- Barry Geftman
- Wayne Geftman

== Disc jockeys ==
- Wayne Geftman
- David Todd
- Billy Kennedy
- Donald Stone
- Tony White
- Frankie Sestito
- Frank Goodman

== Producers, remix artists, and songwriters ==
- David Todd – Remix artist of over 40 records for a variety of labels, including Philadelphia International Records, RCA Records and WMOT Records.
- Nick Martinelli - Producer for Virgin Records, WMOT Records, West End Records, Prelude Records and more. He went on to become "Producer To The Divas" and his client base included Diana Ross, Stephanie Mills, Five Star, Loose Ends, Phyllis Hyman, Regina Belle, Teddy Pendergrass and others.
- Billy Kennedy – Remixed Direct Current's "Everybody Here Tonight Must Party"
- Andy Kahn and Kurt Borusiewicz - Writers and producers of Karen Young's Hot Shot
- Mark "Marcia" Birts – writer of "Act Like You Know" – WMOT Records
- Carter Burnette - Writer and producer for Whatever Productions

== Artists that performed at Catacombs ==
- Gayle Adams
- Claudja Barry
- Carl Bean
- Regina Belle
- Angela Bofill
- Taka Boom
- Jocelyn Brown
- Miquel Brown
- Sharon Brown
- Jean Carne
- Linda Clifford
- Natalie Cole
- Sarah Dash
- Carol Douglas
- Divine
- First Choice
- Taana Gardner
- Gloria Gaynor
- Gwen Guthrie
- Dan Hartman
- Nona Hendryx
- Jennifer Holliday
- Loleatta Holloway
- Thelma Houston
- Rhetta Hughes
- Geraldine Hunt
- Phyllis Hyman
- Millie Jackson
- Carol Jiani
- The Jones Girls
- Grace Jones
- Chaka Khan
- Gladys Knight
- Patti LaBelle
- Denise LaSalle
- Lime
- Ullanda McCullough
- Stephanie Mills
- Jackie Moore
- Melba Moore
- Ann Peebles
- Fonda Rae
- Sheryl Lee Ralph
- Sharon Redd
- The Ritchie Family
- Vicki Sue Robinson
- Dee Dee Sharp
- Sister Sledge
- Candi Staton
- The Three Degrees
- Donna Summer
- Sylvester
- Evelyn Thomas
- The Three Degrees
- Tina Turner
- Luther Vandross
- Tata Vega
- The Village People
- The Weather Girls
- Betty Wright
- Karen Young

== See also ==
- List of electronic dance music venues
