= Hot Shit =

Hot Shit may refer to:

- "Hot Shit" (song), by Cardi B, Kanye West and Lil Durk
- Hot Shit!, album by Quasi
- "Country Grammar (Hot Shit)", song by Nelly

== See also ==
- "Thot Shit", song by Megan Thee Stallion
- Hotshot (disambiguation)
