= Raid (insecticide) =

Brand name of a line of insecticide products

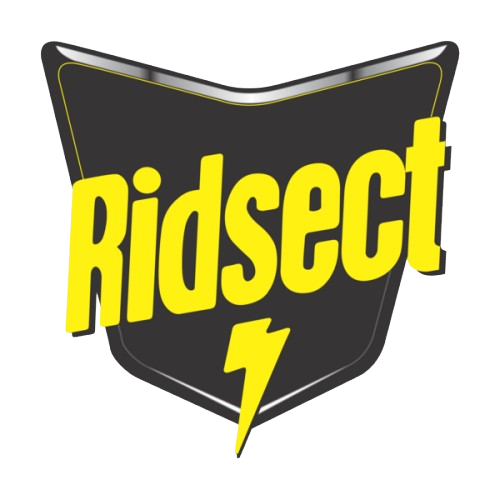
- Product type: Insecticide
- Current owner: S. C. Johnson & Son
- Country: United States
- Introduced: 1956; 70 years ago
- Related brands: Baygon (Note: In Thai, Indonesian and Philippine markets); Ridsect (Malaysia)
- Markets: North America, United Kingdom, China, Taiwan, Hong Kong, Morocco, European Union, Palestine, Israel, Africa, Australia, Saudi Arabia, South Korea, Russia, Argentina, Chile, Vietnam
- Tagline: "Raid Kills Bugs Dead" (1956-2016) "Get Rid of Mosquitoes Immediately!" (Malaysia only, 1956-2000's) "It's Good to Be Tough" (2017-2021) "Protection for Everyone" (2021-2023) "Bugs Hate Raid" (2024-present)
- Website: raid.com

Raid is the brand name of a line of insecticide products produced by S. C. Johnson & Son, first launched in 1956.

The initial active ingredient was allethrin, the first synthetic pyrethroid. As of 2019, Raid Ant & Roach Killer contains pyrethroids, imiprothrin, and cypermethrin; other products contain tetramethrin and prallethrin as active ingredients. Raid Flying Insect Killer, a spray, uses piperonyl butoxide and D-phenothrin.

The brand was sold as Ridsect for Malaysian market.

== "Raid Kills Bugs Dead" slogan ==
The product's original advertising tagline from its introduction in 1956 until 2016, "Raid Kills Bugs Dead", was created by the advertising agency Foote, Cone & Belding. The phrase itself is often attributed to the poet Lew Welch, who worked for the agency at the time.

The line was first used in commerce in 1966 and was trademarked in 1986. Noted animation director Tex Avery was the producer of the first "Kills Bugs Dead" commercials. Artist Don Pegler developed the bug characters used in the US and continued animating them for forty years. Pegler "codified the look, feel and animation" of the weird insects that run in fear of Raid, according to Steve Schildwachter, executive vice-president at Draftfcb.

The slogan had been part of a successful, long-running advertising campaign. Conjuring up images of an Eliot Ness-style raid on an illegal bar during Prohibition, the television spots featured various anthropomorphic cartoon bugs (such as mosquitos, flies, cockroaches, ants, spiders (even though spiders technically are not bugs), etc.) plotting some silly scheme like invading a kitchen, or sometimes doing something like in a crime scene, or hanging out in some places, only to be attacked by the magical appearance of the product which swiftly dispatched the bugs to various giddily horrible deaths. The bugs would scream the brand's name ("RAAAIIIID!!??"), and then a huge cartoon-style explosion would occur, presumably precipitating their demise. The bugs' voices were provided by Avery, Mel Blanc, Paul Frees, Larry Moran, Frank Welker, Tim Dadabo and Paul Hancock.

Similar campaigns have been run in other countries, either by dubbing the US cartoons or by producing local versions, including those for Baygon, another S.C. Johnson brand of insecticides.

== Illicit use ==
In recent years, reports of the use of heavy duty bug sprays as an illicit drug have gained notoriety. Although products such as Raid are relatively safe to humans (when used as intended), the act of huffing, smoking, snorting, vaping, plugging, drinking and/or injecting Raid or other bug sprays can cause irreversible neurological damage, or even death.

In 2019, three people died in West Virginia after overdosing on an unidentified wasp spray. Authorities have warned of a growing trend of ingesting bug spray in the southern United States, supposedly as a substitute for methamphetamine. Possible symptoms of ingesting bug poison include, but are not limited to: erratic behavior, nausea, headache, sore throat, extreme inflammation, redness of the hands and feet, auditory hallucinations, convulsions, coma, and death.

== Competition ==
Raid's main competitors in the United States insecticide market are Black Flag, Hot Shot, Mortein and Baygon (also sister brand).

== Controversy ==
=== Health impacts ===
Exposure to the main ingredient in Raid, a pyrethroid, is correlated with risk of death in humans.

== See also ==
- Insect repellent
- Pesticide
- Wasp dope
