= Allethrins =

Class of synthetic chemicals used as insecticides

Allethrin I (R = −CH_{3}) Allethrin II (R = −COOCH_{3})

The allethrins are a group of related synthetic compounds used in insecticides. They are classified as pyrethroids, i.e. synthetic versions of pyrethrin, a chemical with insecticidal properties found naturally in Chrysanthemum flowers. They were first synthesized in the United States by Milton S. Schechter in 1949. Allethrin was the first pyrethroid.

They are commonly used in ultra-low volume sprays for outdoor mosquito control, and in many household insecticides such as RAID, as well as mosquito coils.

== Chemical structure ==
Allethrin I and allethrin II differ by having a methyl group and a methyl ester, respectively, on one terminus. Each of these allethrins consists of the eight possible stereoisomers. A partly enantiopure variant of allethrin I, consisting of only two stereoisomers in an approximate ratio of 1:1, is called bioallethrin. The same mixture of isomers, but in an approximate ratio of 3:1, is known as esbiothrin.

== Toxicity ==
Chronic exposure to allethrins alters the plasma biochemical profile of humans and may have adverse health effects. Bioallethrin has been shown to cause oxidative damage, cellular toxicity and necrosis of human lymphocytes studied in vitro. It is highly toxic to fish and aquatic invertebrates. At normal application rates, allethrin is slightly toxic to bees. Insects subject to exposure become paralyzed (nervous system effect) before dying. Allethrins are toxic to cats because they either do not produce, or produce less of certain isoforms of glucuronosyltransferase, which serve in hepatic detoxifying metabolism pathways.
