= Nothing Is Real but the Girl =

Single by Blondie

from the album No Exit
- Released: May 31, 1999
- Length: 3:28
- Label: Beyond
- Songwriter: Jimmy Destri
- Producer: Craig Leon

Blondie singles chronology
"Maria" (1999)	"Nothing Is Real but the Girl" (1999)	"No Exit" (1999)

Audio sample
- "Nothing Is Real but the Girl": file; help

"Nothing Is Real but the Girl" is a song by American rock band Blondie. Written by the band's keyboardist Jimmy Destri, it was the second single released from their seventh album, No Exit (1999), on May 31, 1999. The single peaked at number 26 in the United Kingdom and number 89 in Germany.

== Background ==
Destri wrote the song with his daughter in mind; however, when the song was re-recorded for the single release, the narrative was changed from the third person to the first, shifting the focus of the song onto vocalist Debbie Harry. For example, "Only her eyes feel solid" became "Only my eyes feel solid". New lyrics were also written for the bridge.

== Track listings ==
All tracks were written by Jimmy Destri unless otherwise noted

UK CD1

1. "Nothing Is Real but the Girl" (Boilerhouse Mix) – 3:29
2. "Nothing Is Real but the Girl" (Danny Tenaglia club mix) – 9:47
3. "Nothing Is Real but the Girl" (Danny Tenaglia Instradub) – 5:33

UK CD2

1. "Nothing Is Real but the Girl" (radio remix with alternate intro) – 3:27
2. "Rip Her to Shreds" (Live) (Debbie Harry, Chris Stein) – 3:32
  - Track 2 recorded in Glasgow, November 1998.
3. "Maria (live) – 5:10
  - Track 3 recorded at the Lyceum Theatre, London on November 22, 1998.

UK cassette single

1. "Nothing Is Real but the Girl" (Boilerhouse Lounge Mix) – 3:26
2. "Rip Her to Shreds" (live) (Harry, Stein) – 3:32
  - Track 2 recorded in Glasgow, November 1998.

US CD (promo only)

1. "Nothing Is Real but the Girl" (radio remix) – 3:13
2. "Nothing Is Real but the Girl" (radio remix with alternate intro) – 3:27

== Chart peaks ==
Chart (1999)	Peak position
Europe (Eurochart Hot 100)	78
Germany (GfK)	89
Scottish Singles Sales (Official Charts)	26
Spain (Promusicae)	11
UK Singles (Official Charts)	26
