= Peggy King =

American jazz singer (1930–2026)

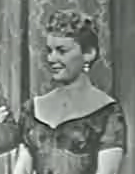
- Peggy King on The Jack Benny Program

Background information
- Born: Margaret Elizabeth King; February 16, 1930; Greensburg, Pennsylvania, U.S.
- Died: October 25, 2026 (aged 96) Wynnewood, Pennsylvania, U.S.
- Genres: Jazz, traditional pop
- Occupations: Singer, actress
- Years active: 1950s–2016

Margaret Elizabeth King (February 16, 1930 – October 25, 2026) was an American jazz singer and actress. She was a member of big bands led by Charlie Spivak, Ralph Flanagan, and Ray Anthony.

== Early life ==
Margaret Elizabeth King was born in Greensburg, Pennsylania, on February 16, 1930, to Floyd Henry King (1902–1978) and Mary Margaret Finan (1908–2001). She was adopted by her aunt and uncle. When she was a teenager, she figured out that she had inherited her singing voice from her birth mother, whom she had known as her favorite aunt.

== Career ==
"Pretty Perky Peggy King", as she was nicknamed, appeared on The George Gobel Show from 1954 through 1957 and guest-starred on many other TV shows, including Bob Hope's 1956 Chevy Show, American Bandstand, Maverick, Dragnet, The Steve Allen Show, The Kraft Music Hall with Milton Berle, What's My Line?, The Tonight Show Starring Johnny Carson, The Perry Como Show, The Garry Moore Show, and The Jack Benny Program.

In 1952, MGM signed her to a contract, which led to a singing cameo in Vincente Minnelli's The Bad and the Beautiful (recorded with Skip Martin for MGM Records) and a series of commercial jingles for Hunt's tomato sauce. These last brought her to the attention of Mitch Miller at Columbia Records. Miller signed her to a long-term contract, under which she made two best-selling albums, Wish Upon on a Star and Girl Meets Boy and a string of hit singles, including "Make Yourself Comfortable" in 1954. She sang the Oscar-nominated song "Count Your Blessings" on the 1955 Academy Awards telecast, and both Billboard and Down Beat magazine named her Best New Singer of 1955–56.

King sang in the 1955 comedy Abbott and Costello Meet the Mummy and was featured as chief co-star on the poster. She portrayed the stewardess Janet Turner in the suspense thriller Zero Hour! (1957), later the basis for the satirical comedy Airplane! She starred opposite Tab Hunter in the television musical Hans Brinker, or The Silver Skates (1958) and in a musical version of Jack and the Beanstalk co-starring Joel Grey, Celeste Holm, and Cyril Ritchard. Her albums include Lazy Afternoon (1959), Oh What a Memory We Made Tonight, and Peggy King Sings Jerome Kern. In 2008 Sepia Records reissued the original cast album of Hans Brinker, or The Silver Skates, adding sixteen of King's Columbia recordings and four of Hunter's. In 2016, Fresh Sound released her first new album in 36 years.

The Broadcast Pioneers of Philadelphia inducted King into their Hall of Fame in 2010. She resumed her singing career in 2013 with the All-Star Jazz Trio, and she received strong notices at 54 Below in New York and the Metropolitan Room. King continued to perform in nightclubs, theatres and at charitable and private events on a regular basis, with music director/pianist Andrew Kahn and accompanied by The All-Star Jazz Trio, as late as 2014.

On February 8, 1960, King became one of the first stars to be honored on the Hollywood Walk of Fame. Her star is located on the north side of the 6500 block of Hollywood Boulevard.

== Personal life and death ==
King married three times. She first married the trumpeter-trombonist Knobby Lee (born Norbert William Francis Lidrbauch) on February 2, 1953, in Los Angeles County. She met Lee while singing with Ralph Flanagan; he had been a trumpeter with the band. Lee and King were divorced on October 19, 1956, in Los Angeles County. After ending a two-year engagement to Andre Previn in 1958, she married Samuel Rudofker (1921–1994) of Philadelphia, in the early 1960s with whom she had two children and one granddaughter. Tabloids and biographies suggest that she had once had a relationship with Sammy Davis Jr.

Peggy King died from complications of Alzheimer's disease at the Saunders House Assisted Living facility in Wynnewood, Pennsylvania, on October 25, 2026, at the age of 96.

== Discography ==
- Wish upon a Star (Columbia, 1955)
- Girl Meets Boy (Columbia, 1955)
- Lazy Afternoon (Imperial, 1959)
- Oh What a Memory We Made ... Tonight (Stash Records, 1984)
- Peggy King Sings Jerome Kern (Stash Records, 1985)
