= Hot Shot (Karen Young album) =

Studio album by Karen Young
- Released: 1978
- Recorded: 1978
- Genre: Pop, disco
- Label: Altra Moda Music
- Producer: Andrew Kahn; Walter Kahn; Kurt Borusiewicz

Hot Shot is the debut studio album by American singer Karen Young. It was released on 1978 by Altra Moda Music. The album features two disco hits all written, produced and arranged by Andrew Kahn and Kurt Borusiewicz; the title track, "Bring On the Boys" and "Baby You Ain't Nothing Without Me".

== Track listing ==
1. "Hot Shot" - 8:40
2. "God Knows I'm Just a Woman" - 4:25
3. "Beau" - 4:03
4. "Bring on the Boys" - 5:40
5. "Where Is He" - 6:00
6. "Baby You Ain't Nothing Without Me" - 6:50

== Charts ==
Chart (1978)	Peak position
US Billboard Top LPs & Tape	185
US Dance Albums	57

== Singles ==
Year	Single	Chart positions	
Year	Single	US	US Dance
1978	"Hot Shot"	40	10
1978	"Bring On the Boys"	90	74
1978	"Baby You Ain't Nothing Without Me"	80	64

== Personnel ==
- Backing Vocals: Brian Phipps, Karen Dempsey, Karen Hawkins, Karla Garrison, Lorenzo Wright, Sonia Lonon, Steve West, Willie Mae Kidd "Sasha"*
- Bass: Vince Fay
- Cello – Larry Gold, Paul Eves
- Clarinet, Saxophone: Larry McKenna, Mike Pedicin, Ron Kerber
- Congas, Drums: Daryl Burgee
- Design [Jacket, Logo]: Peter Davis
- Engineer: Andrew Kahn, Kurt Borusiewicz, Larry Lynch, Lorenzo Wright, Wally Hayman, Walter Kahn
- Executive Producer: Walter Kahn
- Guitar: Lorenzo Wright
- Handclaps: Andrew Kahn, Chris Tortu, Darryl Adderley, Karen Young, Kurt Borusiewicz, Robert P. Brown, Sonia Lonon, Troy Dougherty, Willie Mae Kidd
- Maracas: Troy Dougherty
- Mastered By: David Moyssiadis
- Mixed By [Assistant]: Billy Kennedy, Frank Sestito, Troy Dougherty, Valeria Luzi, Wayne Gettman
- Percussion: Sahaba Daku
- Photography By [Cover]: Stephen Murri
- Piano, Electric Piano [Rhodes]: Andrew Kahn
- Producer, Arranged By: Andrew Kahn, Kurt Borusiewicz
- Tambourine: Dennis "Hollywood" McTigue, John Anderson
- Timbales: Ted Dormoi
- Trombone: Ed Cascarella, Lee Southall, Roger DeLillo
- Trumpet: Evan Solot, Jack Wilson, Richard Posmontier, Bob Hartzell
- Viola: Tony Sinagoga, Davis Barnett
- Violin: Wm. Mungiole, Charles Apollonia, Charles Parker, Chris Reeves, Don Renaldo, Gov Hutchinson, Joe Bonaccorso, Lenore Wolaniuk, Rudy Malizia

== Credits ==
- Recorded & mixed at Queen Village Recordings Studios, Philadelphia, PA.
- Mastered at Frankford/Wayne Recording Labs, Philadelphia, Pa.
- Engineer:Andrew Kahn, Kurt Borusiewicz, Larry Bynch, Lorenzo Wright, Wally Hayman, Walter Kahn
- Executive Producer: Walter Kahn
- Mixed By [Assistant]: Billy Kennedy, Frank Sestito, Troy Dougherty, Valeria Luzi, Wayne Gettman
- Producer: Andrew Kahn, Kurt Borusiewicz
