= David Todd (producer) =

David Todd is an American disco and house musician and remixer. He was born in Bristol, Pennsylvania. Todd began his career in the music industry at a small retail record store in New York around 1970.

== History ==
Because of his discriminating ear and extensive knowledge of dance music, he was invited to DJ at Fire Island's prestigious Ice Palace in 1971. Todd continued to parlay his musical expertise and became the first working DJ to take a promotions and A&R role at a label for RCA Records.

While at RCA, Todd introduced the "Latin Hustle" to Van McCoy, inspiring McCoy to record "The Hustle." Some of David's remixes for the RCA label include "Shame" by Evelyn "Champagne" King, "Stubborn Kind of Fella" for Buffalo Smoke, and "Keep it Confidential" by former Labelle member, Nona Hendryx.

In the early 1980s, Todd returned to Philadelphia and served as the resident DJ for The Catacombs. During that time, he partnered with local DJ turned A&R man Nick Martinelli to form one of Philadelphia's most notable remix and productions teams since Gamble and Huff.

== Production credits ==
Artist	Song title	Label / Catalog Number	Year
Faith Hope & Charity	"Life Goes On"	RCA Victor Records – PD-10950	1976
Ralph Graham	"What Am I To Do"	RCA Records – JD-11038	1977
State Department	"Slow Love"	RCA Records – JD-11095	1977
Buffalo Smoke	"Stubborn Kind of Fella"	RCA Records – JD-11368	1977
New York Community Choir	"Express Yourself" / "Have A Good Time"	RCA Records – PD-11006	1977
Evelyn "Champagne" King	"Shame"	RCA Records PD-11213	1977
The Choice Four	"Come Down To Earth" / "Two Different Worlds"	RCA Victor – PD-11094	1977
The Skyliners	"The Love Bug (Done Bit Me Again)"	Tortoise International – YD-11345	1978
Dee Dee Sharp Gamble	"Breaking and Entering"	Philadelphia International Records – AS 918	1980
William DeVaughn	"Be Thankful For What You Got"	TEC Records – PR 102	1980
Rose Royce	"New Love"	Montage Records – MS 620	1981
Keni Burke	"Let Somebody Love You"	RCA Records – JD-1229	1981
Brandi Wells	"Watch Out (Club Version)"	WMOT Records – 1340	1981
The Funk Fusion Band	"Can You Feel It"	WMOT Records – 4W9 02416	1981
Chris Thomas	"Celebrity Funk"	DOC International Records – DC-101	1982
Tavares	"Got To Find My Way Back To You"	RCA Victor – PD-13434	1982
Stone	"Girl I Like The Way You Move"	West End Records – WES 22147(A)	1982
Raw Silk	"Do It To The Music"	West End Records – WES 22148	1982
(B. T.) Brenda Taylor	"You Can't Have Your Cake and Eat it Too"	West End Records – WES 22149	1982
Mahogany	"Ride On The Rhythm"	West End Records – WES 22150	1982
Major Harris	"I Want Your Love"	Buzz International – VIBE 1 T	1983
Major Harris	"All My Life"	London Records – 810 276-1	1983
Rocket	"Here Comes My Love"	Quality Records – QUS 033	1983
Fredi Grace & Rhinestone	"Head Over Heels"	RCA Records – PB 3498	1983
Evelyn "Champagne" King	"Action"	RCA Records – PC-3683	1983
Nona Hendryx	"Keep It Confidential"	RCA Victor – PD-13438	1983
Sunfire	"Video Queen"	Warner Brothers – 0-20150	1983
Shirley Lites	"Heat You Up (Melt You Down)"	West End Records – WES 22155A	1983
Raw Silk	"Just In Time"	West End Records – WES 22159	1983
Sybil Thomas	"Rescue Me"	West End Records – WES 22160	1983
Bonnie Pointer	"Premonition"	Private I Records – 311118	1984
La Toya Jackson	"Hot Potato"	Private I Records – 4Z9 05074	1984
Mikki featuring Starz	"Dance Lover"	Rams Horn Records – RHR 3412	1985
Evelyn "Champagne" King	"High Horse"	RCA Records – PW 13409	1985
Kim Wilde	"Say You Really Want Me"	MCA Records – MCA-23678(B)	1986
Janice McClain	"Passion and Pain"	MCA Records, Ltd. – MC 1109	1986
Fat Larry's Band	"Sunrise Sunset"	Omni Records/Atlantic DMD 956	1986
Fat Larry's Band	"Teach Me (There is Something About Love)"	Omni Records/Atlantic - DMD 991	1986
Regina Belle	"You've Got The Love"	CBS Records (Canada) – REBE T1	1987
Regina Belle	"How Could You Do It To Me?"	Columbia Records – 38-07735	1987
Tracie Spencer	"Symptoms of True Love"	Capitol Records – 12CLX 490(B)	1988
Rick James	"Sexual Luv Affair"	Reprise Records – 0-21036	1988
George Benson	"Let's Do It Again"	Warner Brothers Records - 0-21071	1988
