= Propoxur =

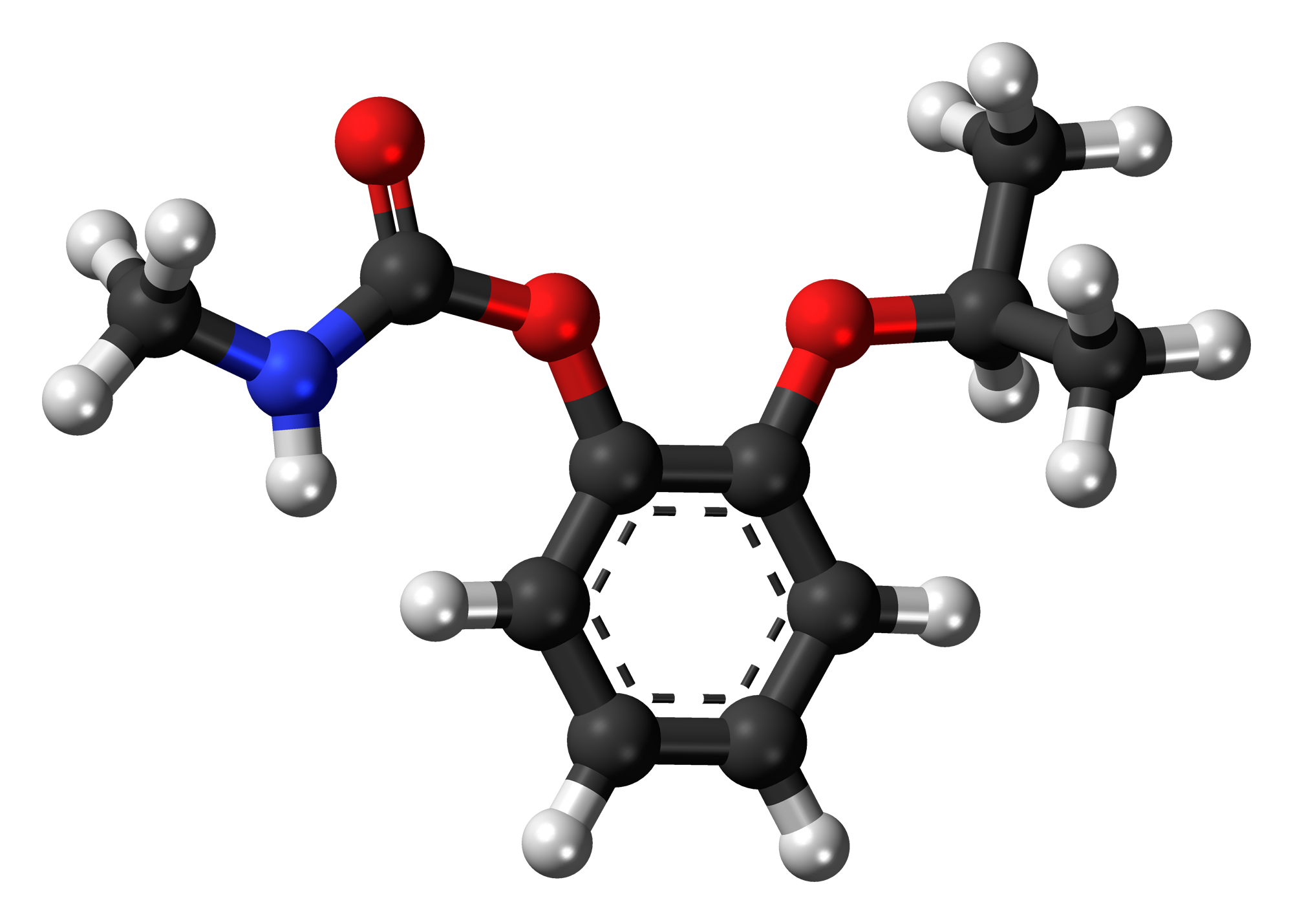

Names
- Preferred IUPAC name 2-[(Propan-2-yl)oxy]phenyl methylcarbamate

Identifiers
| CAS Number | 114-26-1 |
| 3D model (JSmol) | Interactive image |
| ChEBI | CHEBI:34938 |
| ChEMBL | ChEMBL446060 |
| ChemSpider | 4775 |
| ECHA InfoCard | 100.003.676 |
| KEGG | C14334 |
| PubChem CID | 4944 |
| UNII | BFH029TL73 |
| CompTox Dashboard (EPA) | DTXSID7021948 |
- InChI: InChI=1S/C11H15NO3/c1-8(2)14-9-6-4-5-7-10(9)15-11(13)12-3/h4-8H,1-3H3,(H,12,13) Key: ISRUGXGCCGIOQO-UHFFFAOYSA-N
- SMILES: CC(C)Oc1ccccc1OC(=O)NC

Properties
| Chemical formula | C_{11}H_{15}NO_{3} |
| Molar mass | 209.245 g·mol^{−1} |
| Appearance | White to tan crystalline powder |
| Odor | faint, characteristic |
| Melting point | 86 to 92 °C; 187 to 197 °F; 359 to 365 K |
| Boiling point | decomposes |
| Solubility in water | 0.2% (20°C) |
| Vapor pressure | 0.0000937 mmHg (20 °C) |

Pharmacology
| ATCvet code | QP53AE02 (WHO) |

Hazards
| Flash point | > 149 °C; 300 °F; 422 K |
- NIOSH (US health exposure limits)
| PEL (Permissible) | none |
| REL (Recommended) | TWA 0.5 mg/m^{3} |
| IDLH (Immediate danger) | N.D. |
- Except where otherwise noted, data are given for materials in their standard state (at 25 °C [77 °F], 100 kPa). verify (what is ?) Infobox references

Propoxur is a carbamate, non-systemic, synthetic insecticide, produced from catechol, and was introduced in 1959 by Bayer.

== Action ==
Carbamate insecticides are cholinesterase inhibitors and kill insects by inactivating the enzyme acetylcholinesterase.

It has a fast knockdown and long residual effect, and is used against turf, forestry, and household pests and fleas. It is also used in pest control for domestic animals, Anopheles mosquitoes, ants, gypsy moths, and other agricultural pests. It can also be used as a molluscicide. It has been an ingredient in the consumer insecticide brand, Baygon.

== Environmental effects ==
Propoxur is highly toxic to many bird species, although its toxicity varies by the species, and it is highly toxic to honeybees. It is moderately to slightly toxic to fish and other aquatic species.

EFSA recommends that the active substance should be assessed for neurotoxicity, since propoxur acts by inhibition of acetyl cholinesterase. Several U.S. states have petitioned the Environmental Protection Agency (EPA) to use propoxur against bedbug infestations, but the EPA has been reluctant to approve indoor use because of its potential toxicity to children after chronic exposure.

Propoxur rapidly breaks down in alkaline solution.

== Regulation ==
The use of propoxur products ended in Europe after no manufacturer submitted an application for approval in 2002. Manufacturers reached an agreement with the US EPA to withdraw propoxur from flea and tick collars during 2015–2016 due to concerns about exposure of the ingredient to children.
