= Bioallethrin =

Chemical compound for forming insecticides

Names
- IUPAC name (RS)-3-allyl-2-methyl-4-oxocyclopent-2-enyl (1R,3R)-2,2-dimethyl -3-(2-methylprop-1-enyl)cyclopropanecarboxylate

Identifiers
CAS Number	260359-57-7
3D model (JSmol)	Interactive image; Interactive image
ChEBI	CHEBI:39118
ChemSpider	18923353
ECHA InfoCard	100.008.677
PubChem CID	11442
UNII	G79DM7O471
CompTox Dashboard (EPA)	DTXSID8035180
- InChI: InChI=1S/C19H26O3/c1-7-8-13-12(4)16(10-15(13)20)22-18(21)17-14(9-11(2)3)19(17,5)6/h7,9,14,16-17H,1,8,10H2,2-6H3/t14-,16?,17+/m1/s1 Key: ZCVAOQKBXKSDMS-AQYZNVCMSA-N; InChI=1/C19H26O3/c1-7-8-13-12(4)16(10-15(13)20)22-18(21)17-14(9-11(2)3)19(17,5)6/h7,9,14,16-17H,1,8,10H2,2-6H3/t14-,16?,17+/m1/s1 Key: ZCVAOQKBXKSDMS-AQYZNVCMBM
- SMILES: CC1=C(C(=O)CC1OC(=O)C2C(C2(C)C)C=C(C)C)CC=C; C/C(C)=C/[C@@H]2[C@@H](C(=O)OC1CC(=O)C(\CC=C)=C1\C)C2(C)C

Properties
Chemical formula	C_{19}H_{26}O_{3}
Molar mass	302.40794

Pharmacology
ATC code	P03AC02 (WHO) QP53AC02 (WHO)
Legal status	AU: S6 (Poison) / Schedule 5
- Except where otherwise noted, data are given for materials in their standard state (at 25 °C [77 °F], 100 kPa). verify (what is ?) Infobox references

Bioallethrin is an ectoparasiticide. It consists of two of the eight stereoisomers of allethrin in any ratio.

Esbiothrin is a mixture of the same two stereoisomers, but in an approximate ratio of R:S = 1:3.

Esbioallethrin or S-bioallethrin is the pure S-form (that is, the wedge in the structure as shown in the box points down).

The name bioallethrin was a common name approved by the British Standards Institution and published in. BS 1831 has been withdrawn, and the common name has been adopted by ISO. It is also included in and earlier editions.
