= Hotshot (basketball) =

Hotshot is a basketball shooting game. Played mainly in New England, hotshot may be played by one or more players. Hotshot is unique in that it is easy to provide handicaps for less experienced players, allowing them to compete with better shooters. Hotshot is also unique in that it may be manipulated to fit any time frame, from five minutes to over an hour.

== Rules of play ==
First, players choose a spot on the court from which to "shoot for the ball". Players each take a shot and the first to hit a shot successfully wins first possession of the ball. Once a player has won the ball, he chooses a number of spots, called "hotspots", on the court, from which to shoot. The number of hotspots to be chosen is determined before the game. No hotspot may be inside the key.

Once the player has chosen his hotspots, he proceeds to his first and takes five shots, keeping track of how many he has missed. On the fifth shot, or "hotshot", the player must prepare to make his own rebound as quickly as possible, because he will have to make a number of shots from wherever he recovers the ball. If he recovers the ball outside the three-point line, he may take his shots from wherever the ball passed over the three-point line; if the player made his "hotshot", he may take his shots from wherever the ball left the key, if it is outside the key when recovered. If the player hits all five of his hotspot shots, he receives a twenty-point bonus and need not recover his rebound, but may move on to his next hotspot.

If the player did not go five for five, the spot where the player recovers his rebound is known as the "offspot." In order to proceed to his next hotspot, the player must make as many shots as he missed in the previous round in a row from his offspot. For example, if the player missed three shots from his hotspot, he must make three in a row from his offspot to proceed. If the player misses five shots from his offspot before making the necessary shots in a row, he receives a zero and may proceed to his next hotspot.

Once a player has shot from each of his hotspots, he adds up his score, then gives the ball to the next player.

== Scoring ==
When shooting from a hotspot, scoring is simple: a player receives five points for a hit shot, and zero points for a miss. When shooting from an offspot, a player must make the necessary number of shots in a row to score any points. If the player does succeed in making his necessary shots, he receives ten points minus twice the number of shots he missed from his offspot. For example, if the player missed two shots before completing his offspot round, he would receive 10 - 2*2 points, or 10 - 4 = 6 points for the offspot round.

== Tournament play ==
Hotshot can also be a tournament. In tournaments the game is different from normal in a few ways. First players have only a minute to complete their turn, and must get their own rebounds on every shot and hotspots are worth different numbers of points depending on their distance from the basket. Also, offspot rounds are generally not part of tournaments. Players may get a bonus if they finish their round in less than a minute.

== Alternate versions ==
Penalties - In some versions, a player receives a penalty for missing all five of his hotspot shots. The penalty varies from ten to twenty, and in some versions, the player does not get an offspot round but must move directly to his next hotspot.

"Sprees" - In some versions, a player may choose to yell the word "spree" after making five out of five shots from his hotspot. Upon calling "spree", the player forfeits his twenty-point bonus, but may continue taking shots from his hotspot until he misses or reaches fifteen shots total (including the original five shots). Every shot is worth five points as if the hotspot round was still going, and thus a player may receive a maximum of 75 points total at one hotspot. If a player calls spree, he need not take an offspot round.

Handicaps - In some versions, players must all shoot from the same hotspots. In others, players may choose their own, with experienced players choosing more challenging shots than the novices. This allows for novices to compete with more advanced players, evening out the playing field.

Switching turns - Sometimes, players shoot from all their hotspots before giving the ball to the next player. Sometimes, players may alternate after every hotspot. This is a personal choice and may be made before the game.
