= Transfluthrin =

Chemical compound used as an insecticide

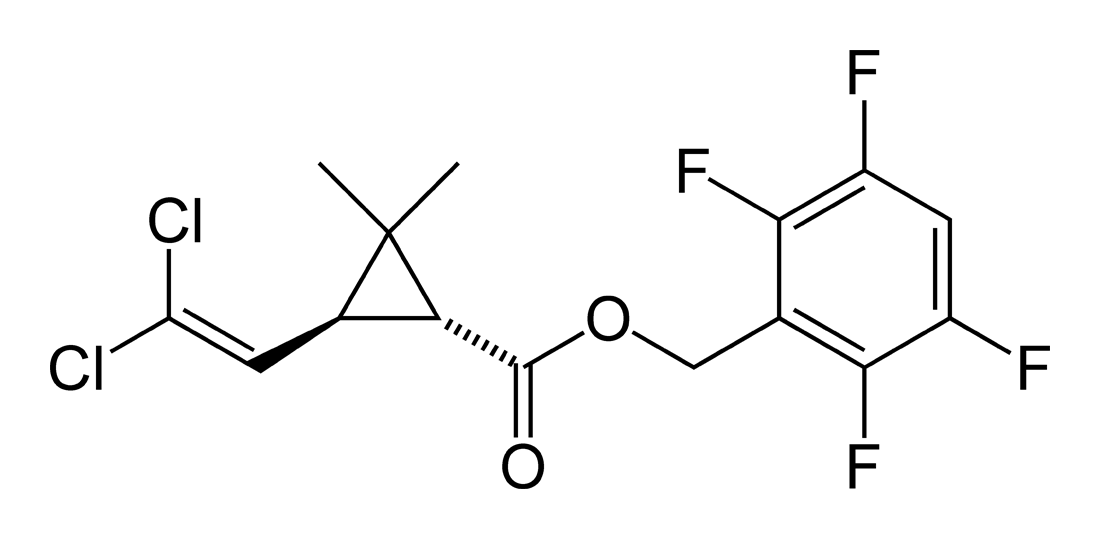

Names
- Preferred IUPAC name (2,3,5,6-Tetrafluorophenyl)methyl (1R,3S)-3-(2,2-dichloroethen-1-yl)-2,2-dimethylcyclopropane-1-carboxylate
- Other names – CA: (1R-trans)-(2,3,5,6-tetrafluorophenyl)methyl 3-(2,2-dichloroethenyl)-2,2- dimethylcyclopropanecarboxylate – Common name transfluthrin: E-ISO (published). – Synonym: benfluthrin (Bayer), NAK 4455

Identifiers
CAS Number	118712-89-3
3D model (JSmol)	Interactive image
ChEBI	CHEBI:32253
ChemSpider	570973
ECHA InfoCard	100.100.666
KEGG	C13410
PubChem CID	656612
UNII	QWL3SKA6EG
CompTox Dashboard (EPA)	DTXSID4046812
- InChI: InChI=1S/C15H12Cl2F4O2/c1-15(2)7(3-10(16)17)11(15)14(22)23-5-6-12(20)8(18)4-9(19)13(6)21/h3-4,7,11H,5H2,1-2H3/t7-,11+/m1/s1 Key: DDVNRFNDOPPVQJ-HQJQHLMTSA-N; InChI=1/C15H12Cl2F4O2/c1-15(2)7(3-10(16)17)11(15)14(22)23-5-6-12(20)8(18)4-9(19)13(6)21/h3-4,7,11H,5H2,1-2H3/t7-,11+/m1/s1 Key: DDVNRFNDOPPVQJ-HQJQHLMTBF
- SMILES: Cl/C(Cl)=C/[C@@H]2[C@@H](C(=O)OCc1c(F)c(F)cc(F)c1F)C2(C)C

Properties
Chemical formula	C_{15}H_{12}Cl_{2}F_{4}O_{2}
Molar mass	371.15 g·mol^{−1}
Appearance	Colorless crystals
Density	1.507 g/cm^{3} (23 °C)
Melting point	32 °C (90 °F; 305 K)
Boiling point	135 °C (275 °F; 408 K) at 0.1 mm Hg; ~ 250 °C at 760 mm Hg
Solubility in water	5.7×10^{−5} g/L = 57 μg/L
Solubility in hexane, isopropanol, toluene, dichloromethane	very soluble
Vapor pressure	Conflicting data: 1×10^{−4} Pa (20 °C; 15 μg/m^{3}) or 9×10^{−4} Pa (20 °C)
- Except where otherwise noted, data are given for materials in their standard state (at 25 °C [77 °F], 100 kPa). verify (what is ?) Infobox references

Transfluthrin is a fast-acting pyrethroid insecticide with low persistency. It has the molecular formula C_{15}H_{12}Cl_{2}F_{4}O_{2}.

Transfluthrin can be used in the indoor environment against flies, mosquitoes, moths and cockroaches. It is a relatively volatile substance and acts as a contact and inhalation agent.

Transfluthrin, if used contrary to product instructions, may cause symptoms of poisoning including nervousness, anxiety, tremor, convulsions, skin allergies, sneezing, running nose and irritation. Treatment depends on symptoms. No specific antidotes are known, but antihistamines may help to control any allergies.

In experiments, transfluthrin was shown to kill 85 percent of mosquitos within one hour of exposure at concentrations below 0.3 μg/m^{3} (which was the detection limit) in air. (The data suggests that transfluthrin is effective at these concentrations within much less than an hour of exposure.)

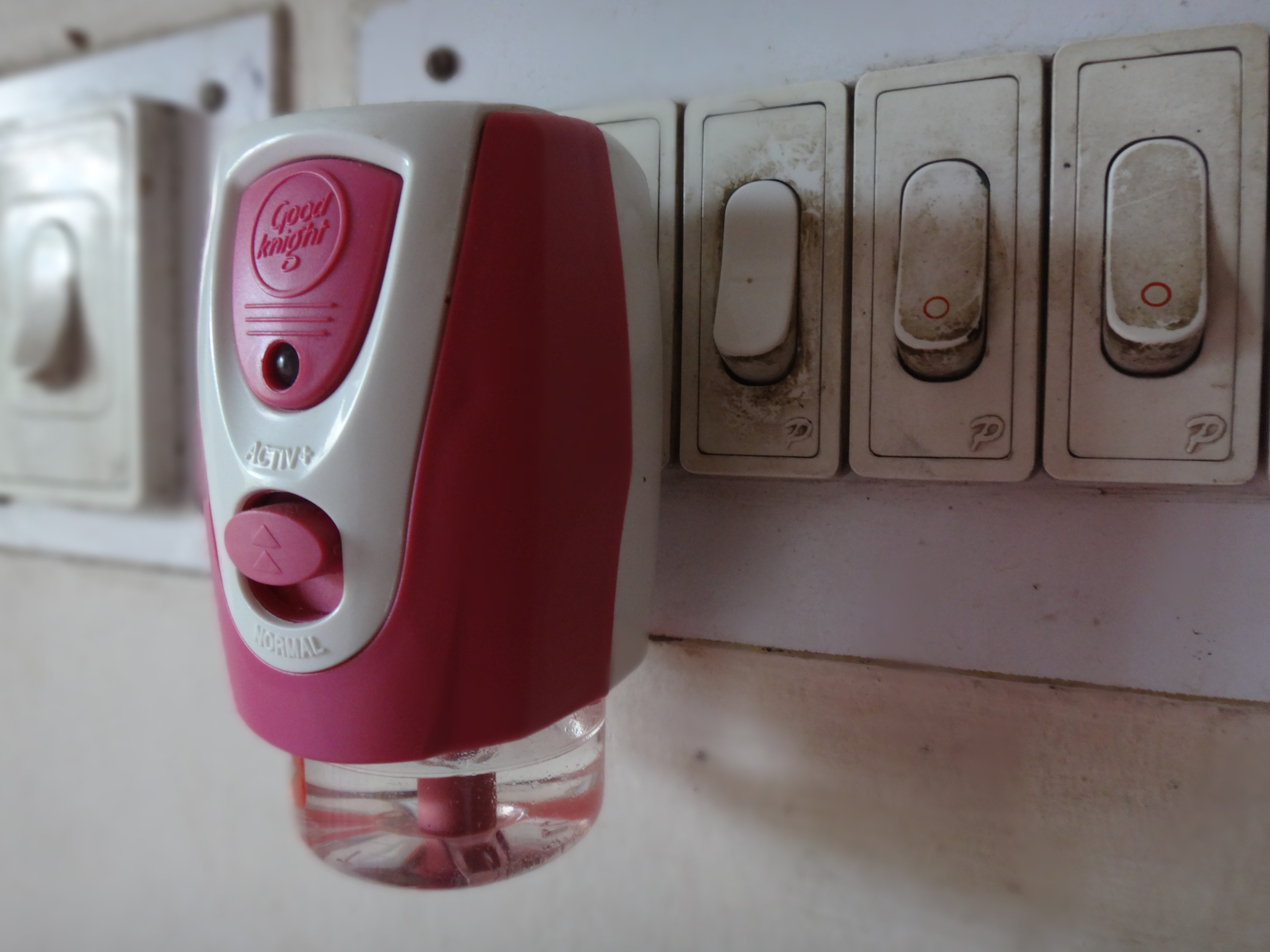
Mosquito repellent vaporizer often contain Transfluthrin or Prallethrin

Various household transfluthrin products such as vaporizers and mosquito coils may result in concentrations of 15 μg/m^{3} to 40 μg/m^{3}. In the EU, the acceptable exposure level (AEL) for humans is 500 μg/m^{3}.

== See also ==
- Metofluthrin
- Tefluthrin
