= Wasp dope =

Recreational ingestion of insecticides

Wasp dope, or wasping, also known as wasp meth, shock dope, hot shots or by the street names KD, Katie, and zombie, refers to the ingestion of common household insecticides, in particular wasp and hornet sprays that contain pyrethroids, either combined with or as a substitute for more conventional addictive substances that cause euphoria, such as methamphetamine or crack cocaine. Since the 2020s, wasp dope has become increasingly popular in the southern United States, although there are obscure reports of insecticide abuse dating back to the 1980s.

== History ==
The origin of wasp dope remains unclear, and very little research is available on wasp dope users.

In 1979, at a hearing before the United States House of Representatives, it was reported that there was knowledge about the abuse of Raid wasp killer among American drug users.

A July 2000 report from the Journal of Hand Surgery describes five patients in the United States who injected common bug poison. Extreme inflammation and liquefaction necrosis were among the pathologies observed in these cases.

== Signs and symptoms ==
Although household bug sprays are relatively safe when used as intended, the act of huffing, smoking, snorting, drinking, plugging, vaping or injecting bug poison could result in irreversible neurological damage, or even death. Possible symptoms of ingesting bug poison include, but are not limited to: erratic behavior, nausea, headache, sore throat, extreme inflammation, redness of the hands and feet, auditory hallucinations, convulsions, coma, necrosis, and death.

== Methods of ingestion ==
A case report from Texas describes two different ingestion methods. The patient would spray the insecticide onto a hot surface, which would cause it to crystallize. This purified material would then be inhaled or smoked. It is also said that the crystalline bug poison is dissolved in water, and injected intravenously.

A 1979 hearing before the United States Congress indicated that some American drug users were smoking Raid wasp killer.

== Prevalence ==
Research published in 2020 suggested that 19% of substance abusers in Appalachian Kentucky have ingested wasp dope. The use of wasp dope is strongly associated with homelessness and methamphetamine use in this region.
