= Hot Shot (Karen Young song) =

Single by Karen Young

from the album Hot Shot
- Released: 1978
- Genre: Disco
- Length: 3:15 (single); 4:25 (album)
- Label: West End
- Songwriters: Andrew Kahn, Kurt Borusiewicz
- Producers: Andrew Kahn, Kurt Borusiewicz

Karen Young singles chronology
"Hot Shot" (1978)	"God Bless America" (1980)

"Hot Shot" is a 1978 song written and produced by Andrew Kahn and Kurt Borusiewicz, and recorded by American singer Karen Young. The song was included on her debut studio album of the same name.

"Hot Shot" was released as the lead single from the album and reached number one on the US Billboard disco chart for the week of August 5, 1978 and spent two weeks there. The single also crossed over to the Billboard Hot 100, where it only got as far as number 67 that same year.

In 2007, nearly 30 years after the original charted and 16 years after Young's death, MaxRoxx Music released "Hot Shot: The Karen Young Reheat", which is a revamped version of "Hot Shot", this time with new mixes using the original's vocals. This version, which charted as "Hot Shot 2007", also reached the Dance Club Songs chart, where it peaked at number seven in March 2008.

== Track listings ==
7-inch single
A. "Hot Shot" (vocal-long version) - 4:25
B. "Hot Shot" (vocal-short version) - 3:15

12-inch promo (issued on pink vinyl)
A. "Hot Shot" (vocal) - 8:40
B. "Hot Shot" (instrumental) - 8:24

CD maxi ("Hot Shot 2007")

1. "Hot Shot" (MaxRoxx remake) - 6:37
2. "Hot Shot" (Ralphi Rosario & Craig J remix) - 11:50
3. "Hot Shot" (MaxRoxx dub) - 3:46
4. "Hot Shot" (Daddy's Cool MaxRoxx dub) - 2:29
5. "Hot Shot" (1978 Bottom's Up mix) - 8:17

== Chart positions ==
Chart (1978)	Peak position
U.S. Billboard Hot 100	67
U.S. Billboard National Disco Action Top 40 chart	1
U.S. Billboard Hot Soul Singles chart	24
UK Singles (OCC)	34

Chart (2007)	Peak position
U.S. Billboard Dance Club Songs	7
