= Andrew Kahn =

Andy Kahn
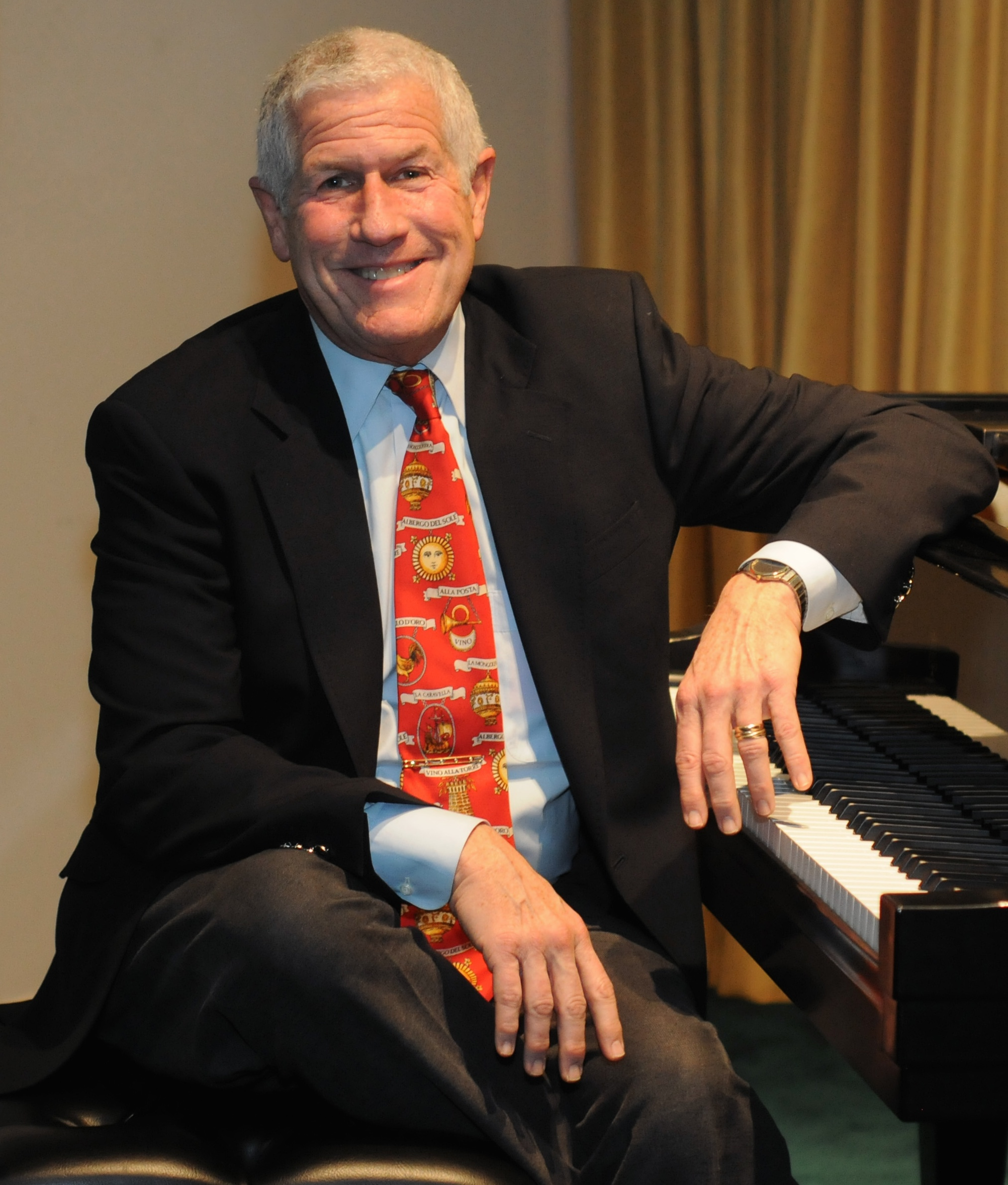
- Andy Kahn

Background information
- Born: Andrew S. Kahn; July 23, 1952 (age 73); Philadelphia, Pennsylvania, U.S.
- Genres: Jazz, disco
- Occupations: Pianist, vocalist, composer, teacher, author, lecturer, arranger, producer
- Years active: 1970–present
- Labels: West End, RSO, Casablanca, Fresh Sound, MaxRoxx Music

Andrew Kahn (born July 23, 1952), frequently credited as Andy Kahn, is a music composer, arranger and producer who was most active in the dance and disco scene of the late 1970s. In 1978, he wrote and produced Karen Young's song "Hot Shot", for West End Records. The song entered into Billboard's sixteen regional Disco Action charts in July, August and September of that year, reaching the number one spot on the Billboard national Disco Action top 40 chart on August 5, 1978, for two weeks. Prior to this, he was an arranger for the 1973 release, "Loves Me Like a Rock" by the Dixie Hummingbirds on ABC Records. In 2009, Kahn returned to performing solo onstage, presenting a repertoire by American composers from the first half of the 20th century. He co-produced and performed on Peggy King's CD Songs a la King. In 2016, Andy Kahn became a Steinway Spirio artist. He is a frequent adjunct presenter at preparatory and charter schools, colleges and universities, lecturing on the Great American Songbook, and on Jazz Harmony & Improvisation. Kahn is currently a voting member for the Recording Academy Grammy Awards. His first book was published in January 2019, The Hot Shot Heard 'Round the World - A Musical Memoir.
