= Prallethrin =

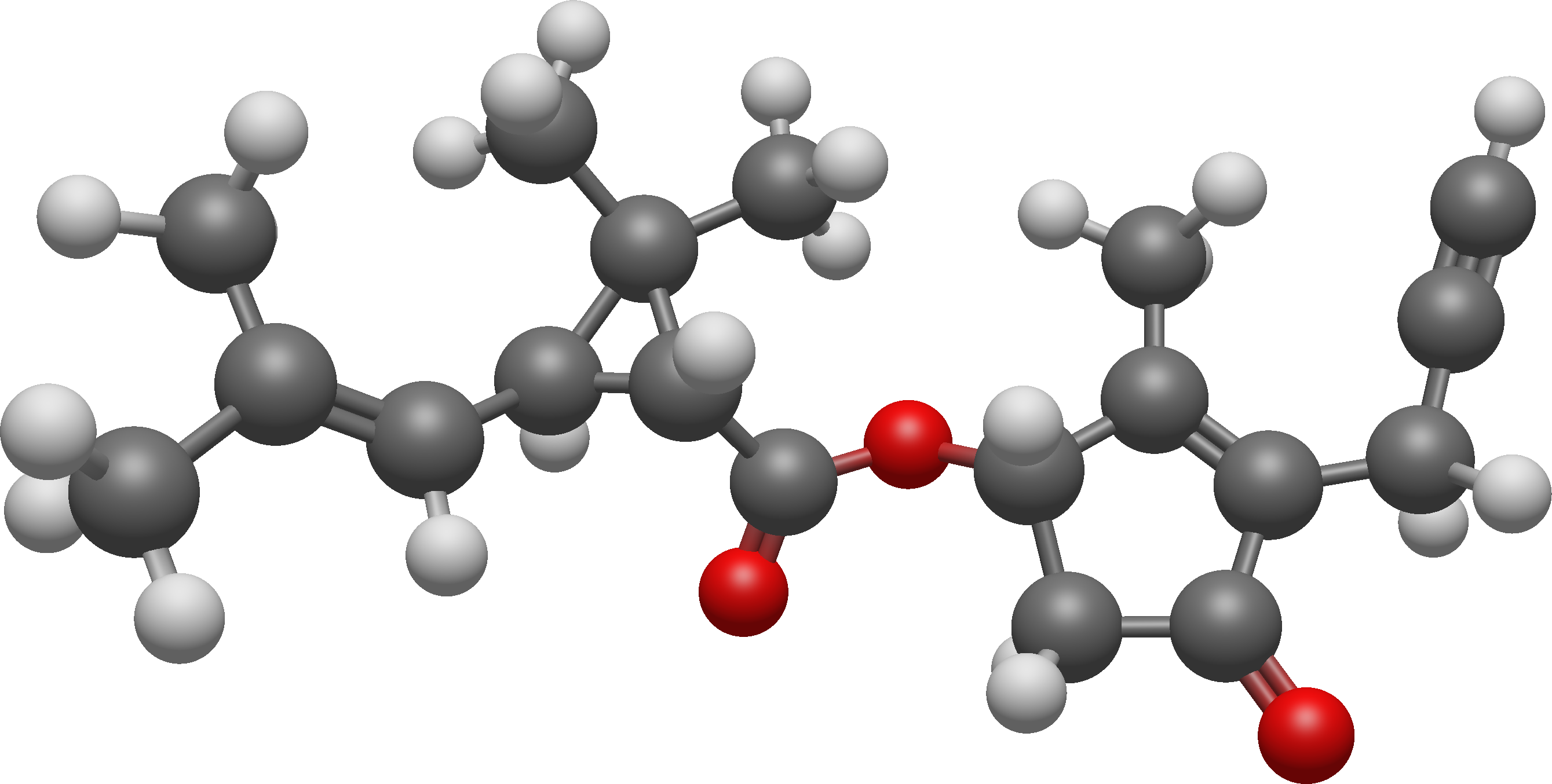

Names
- IUPAC name (S)-2-methyl-4-oxo-3-prop-2-yn-1-ylcyclopent-2-en-1-yl(1R)-cis,trans-2,2-dimethyl-3-(2-methylprop-1-en-1-yl)cyclopropanecarboxylate

Identifiers
CAS Number	23031-36-9
3D model (JSmol)	Interactive image
ChEBI	CHEBI:39391
ChemSpider	8015024
ECHA InfoCard	100.041.246
KEGG	C18510
PubChem CID	9839306
UNII	2X67A9B2Z7
CompTox Dashboard (EPA)	DTXSID0032572
- InChI: InChI=1S/C19H24O3/c1-7-8-13-12(4)16(10-15(13)20)22-18(21)17-14(9-11(2)3)19(17,5)6/h1,9,14,16-17H,8,10H2,2-6H3 Key: SMKRKQBMYOFFMU-UHFFFAOYSA-N; InChI=1/C19H24O3/c1-7-8-13-12(4)16(10-15(13)20)22-18(21)17-14(9-11(2)3)19(17,5)6/h1,9,14,16-17H,8,10H2,2-6H3 Key: SMKRKQBMYOFFMU-UHFFFAOYAR
- SMILES: O=C2\C(=C(\C)C(OC(=O)C1C(/C=C(/C)C)C1(C)C)C2)CC#C

Properties
Chemical formula	C_{19}H_{24}O_{3}
Molar mass	300.398 g·mol^{−1}

Hazards
- GHS labelling
Pictograms	(GHS06: Toxic) (GHS09: Environmental hazard)
Signal word	Danger
Hazard statements	H302, H331, H410
Precautionary statements	P261, P264, P270, P271, P273, P301+P317, P304+P340, P316, P321, P330, P391, P403+P233, P405, P501
- Except where otherwise noted, data are given for materials in their standard state (at 25 °C [77 °F], 100 kPa). verify (what is ?) Infobox references

Prallethrin is a pyrethroid insecticide and mosquito repellent.

== Products ==
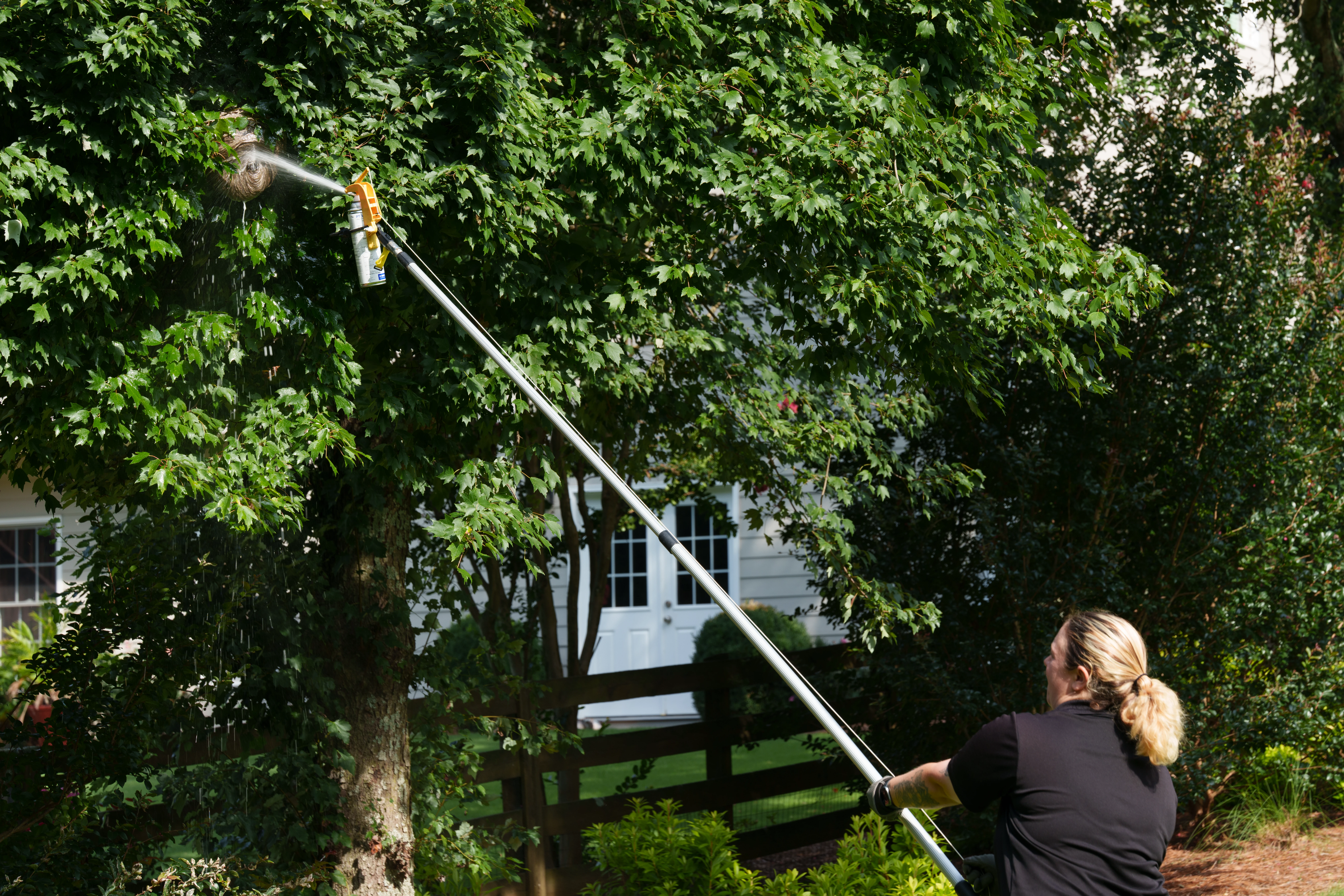
Insecticide containing Prallethrin applied to a wasp nest.

=== Insecticide ===
Prallethrin is the primary insecticide in some products for killing wasps and hornets, including their nests. It is the main ingredient in the consumer product "Hot Shot Ant & Roach Plus Germ Killer" spray.

Pallethrin is marketed as "GoodKnight Silver Power", SC Johnson as "All Out" by Southern Labs in India.

=== Mosquito repellent ===
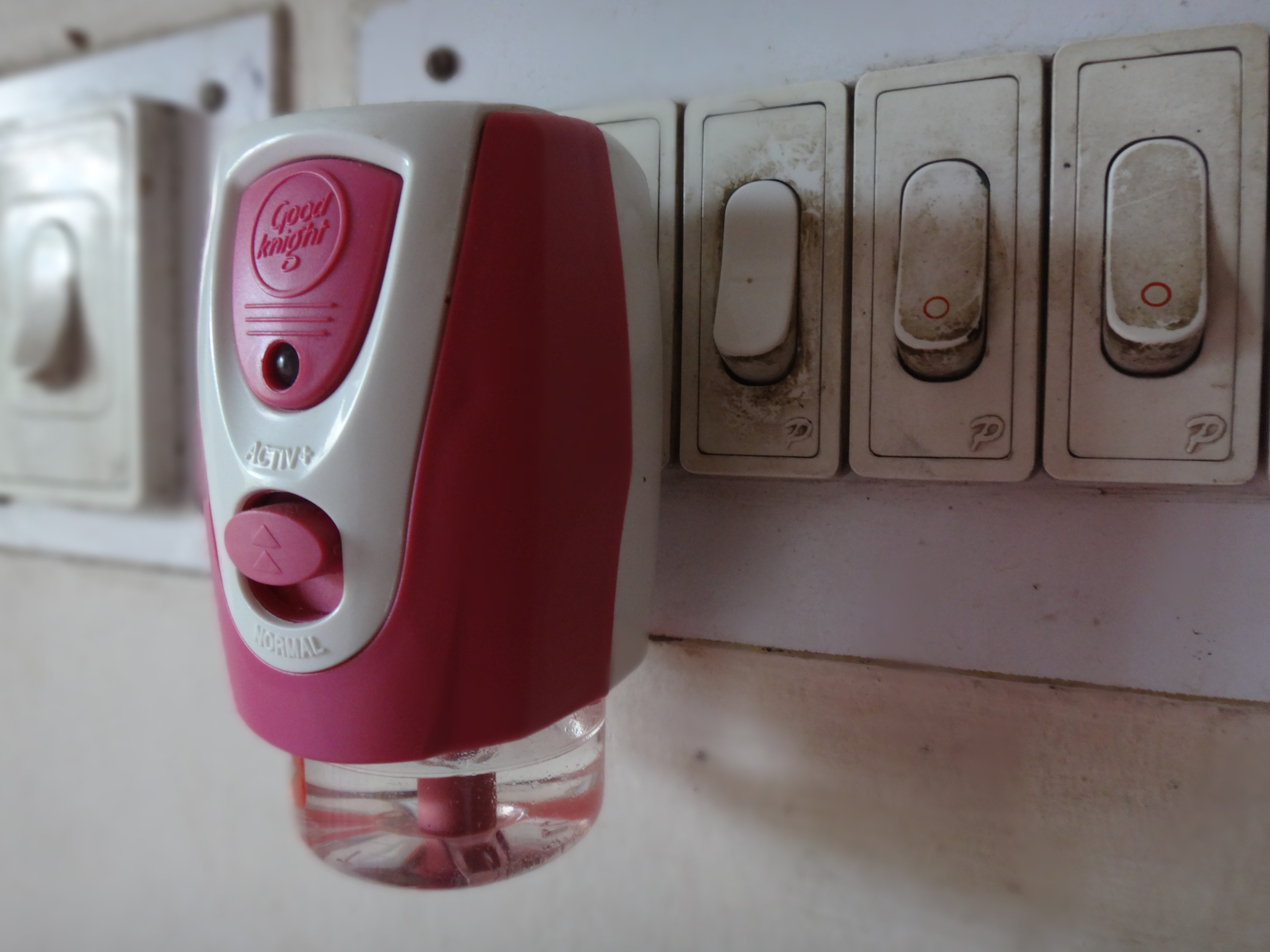
Mosquito repellent vaporizer often contain Transfluthrin or Prallethrin

Prallethrin 1.6% w/w liquid vaporizer is a repellent insecticide which is generally used for the control of mosquitoes in the household. It is marketed as a mosquito repellent by Godrej as "Quit Mozz" in India.

The vaporizer contains Prallethrin in isoparaffin solvents. The liquid is drawn up through a porous clay carbon wick by capillary action then vaporized with a heater.

== Environmental effects ==
The World Health Organization published in 2004 that "Prallethrin is of low mammalian toxicity, with no evidence of carcinogenicity" and "is very toxic to bees and fish but of low toxicity to birds."

Prallethrin is a member of the pyrethroid class of insecticides. Pyrethroids have historically been classified into two groups, Type I and Type II, based upon chemical structure and neurotoxicological effect. Type I pyrethroids lack an alpha-cyano moiety and induce a syndrome in rats consisting of aggressive sparring, altered sensitivity to external stimuli, and fine tremor progressing to whole-body tremor and prostration. These Type I pyrethroid-specific behaviors are collectively described as the T-syndrome. Type II pyrethroids contain an alpha-cyano moiety and produce a syndrome in rats that includes pawing, burrowing, salivation, and coarse tremors leading to choreoathetosis. These Type II pyrethroid-specific behaviors are collectively described as the CS-syndrome Prallethrin is structurally similar to Type I pyrethroids. The adverse outcome pathway (AOP) shared by pyrethroids involves the ability to interact with voltage-gated sodium channels (VGSCs) in the central and peripheral nervous system, leading to changes in neuron firing, and ultimately neurotoxicity.

=== Neurotoxicity in animal models ===
Prallethrin has been evaluated for a variety of toxic effects in experimental toxicity studies. Neurotoxicity was observed throughout the database and is the most sensitive endpoint. Effects were seen across species, sexes, and routes of administration. In the acute rat neurotoxicity study, decreased exploratory behavior was seen at the time of peak effect. Reduced motor activity and transient tremors were also observed in the study. In the subchronic rat neurotoxicity study, a higher arousal rate was observed in animals at the highest dose tested. Clinical signs of neurotoxicity were also observed in other toxicity studies (subchronic and chronic oral studies in dogs, developmental toxicity studies in the rat and rabbit, 21-day dermal and 28-day inhalation studies in rats). No neurotoxic effects were observed in rats in the chronic toxicity study.

Effects were also observed in the liver (rats, mice, and dogs), heart (dogs), and thyroid gland (rats). Some effects were also seen in the kidney (mice and rats). However, neurotoxicity was the most sensitive endpoint in the toxicology database, and other effects were generally seen in the presence of neurotoxicity and/or at higher doses. Liver effects observed included increased weight, elevated serum cholesterol and alkaline phosphatase activity, centrilobular hepatocyte vacuolation, histiocytic infiltration, enlarged liver, and perilobular hepatocellular hypertrophy. In dogs, myocardial fiber degeneration was seen in females in the subchronic study at the highest dose tested. Heart effects were also seen in one mid-dose female in the chronic study (hemorrhage and red discoloration). However, there was no dose response for the observed heart lesions in the study. Thyroid effects were observed in rats and consisted of increases in the number of small follicles and follicular cell hypertrophy and hyperplasia. The thyroid effects were seen in short-term studies in the presence of liver effects. Kidney effects observed were increased weights and histopathology.

Developmental and reproduction studies are available for prallethrin. There was no evidence of increased quantitative or qualitative susceptibility in any of the studies. In the developmental studies, no toxic effects were noted in fetuses up to the highest doses tested. Maternal effects in the studies included tremors, salivation, exaggerated reflexes, and chromorhinorrhea (the discharge of a pigmented secretion from the nose). In the reproduction study, decreased pup body weights were seen during the lactation period. Effects seen in parental animals were decreased body weights and body weight gains, increased liver weights and microscopic findings in the liver, kidney, thyroid, and pituitary.

=== Toxicity in humans ===
Prallethrin is classified as “Not Likely to be Carcinogenic to Humans.” No tumors were observed in rat and mouse carcinogenicity studies up to the highest doses tested. In both the rat and mouse studies, the animals could have tolerated higher dose levels; however, EPA determined that dose levels were adequate to assess potential carcinogenicity.

Prallethrin tested negative in the majority of the genotoxicity studies. It also tested negative in an in vitro chromosomal aberration study in Chinese Hamster Ovary (CHO K1) cells without metabolic activation, but tested positive at all doses with metabolic activation. However, clastogenicity was not clearly dose-related, was seen at nontoxic and slightly toxic doses, and was not expressed in in vivo studies and structure-activity comparisons with the other pyrethroids revealed no correlations with clastogenicity. Other gene mutation, chromosomal aberration, and unscheduled DNA synthesis (UDS) studies were negative; therefore, there is no concern for genotoxicity.

Acute lethality studies indicate moderate acute toxicity by mouth and by inhalation (Category II) and low acute toxicity through the skin (Categories IV). It is irritating to the eye (Category IV). It is not irritating to the skin (Category IV) and not a dermal sensitizer. The weight of evidence from the available guideline, non-guideline, mechanism of action, and pharmacokinetics studies supports characterizing the toxicological profile of pyrethroids, including prallethrin, as being rapid in onset and associated with acute, peak exposures. As of 2014, there was no apparent increase in hazard from repeated/chronic exposures to prallethrin.
