= Karen Young (American singer) =

American disco singer (1951–1991)

- Born: Karen Young; March 23, 1951; Philadelphia, Pennsylvania
- Died: January 26, 1991 (aged 39) Susquehanna, Pennsylvania
- Genres: Disco
- Years active: 1970–1991
- Labels: Altra Moda Music
- Formerly of: Sandd

Karen Young (March 23, 1951 — January 26, 1991) was an American disco singer known for her 1978 hit song "Hot Shot".

== Biography ==
Young grew up in a Northeast Philadelphia rowhouse. She began as a singer of jingles and backing vocalist for Philadelphia-based production companies. In the early 1970s, she performed with the group Sandd, featuring Frank Gilckin (lead guitar), George Emertz (rhythm guitar), Frank Ferraro (bass guitar) and Dennis Westman (drums).

In 1978, Young released the single "Hot Shot", written and produced by (Andy) Andrew Kahn and Kurt Borusiewicz. The song spent two weeks at number 1 on Billboard's disco chart and eventually peaked at number 67 on the Billboard Hot 100 in 1978. An album, also titled Hot Shot, was then released by West End Records of New York City. The song propelled Young to international fame. By 1981, the disco fad had dissipated, and Young was unable to duplicate her success. Young continued her singing career as a local performer in the Philadelphia area, and the song "Hot Shot" became a hit.

She died at age 39 of a possible bleeding peptic ulcer on January 26, 1991, at her home in Susquehanna, Pennsylvania.

== "Hot Shot" in popular culture ==
"Hot Shot" was featured in the 1990 film Reversal of Fortune and in the 2020 documentary The Times of Bill Cunningham. The song was a featured sample in Daft Punk's song "Indo Silver Club" on their album Homework. The song was also used by ITV in the mid-1980s during its coverage of the World Snooker Championship for "hot shots" compilations during the tournament. Hot Shot was covered by the pop band, Blondie and included as a bonus track on the Japan and South Africa editions of their comeback album, No Exit. Various remixes of the song were released in 2007. "Hot Shot" made three separate appearances in the UK Singles Chart in 1978, 1979, and 1997. The highest placing was number 34.

"Rendezvous with Me," a song written by Kahn in 1979, was intended as a follow-up to "Hot Shot," but it was never finished. Discovered in Kahn's tape vault, "Rendezvous with Me" was released by MaxRoxx Music in March 2009.

== Discography ==
=== Albums ===
Title	Album details
Hot Shot	Release date: 1978; Label: West End Records

=== Singles ===
Year	Title	Peak chart positions			Label
Year	Title	US Hot 100	US Dance	UK	Label
1978	"Hot Shot"	67	1	34	West End Records
1978	"Bring on the Boys"	—	31	—	West End Records
1978	"Baby You Ain't Nothing Without Me"	—	—	—	West End Records
1980	"One Sure Way"	—	—	—	Sunshine Recordings
1980	"God Bless America"	—	—	—	Sunshine Recordings
1981	"Dynamite"	—	69	—	Sunshine Recordings
1982	"Expressway to Your Heart"	—	—	—	Atlantic
1982	"Deetour"	—	34	—	Atlantic
1983	"Hot for You"	—	—	—	Sunshine Recordings
1983	"You Don't Know What You Got "	—	—	91	Boardwalk Records, Inc.
1984	"Come-a-Runnin'"	—	—	—	West End Records
1987	"Change in Me"	—	—	—	Wide Angle Records
2008	"Hot Shot - The Karen Young Reheat"	—	7	—	MaxRoxx Music
2009	"Rendezvous with Me"	—	—	—	MaxRoxx Music
"—" denotes releases that did not chart or were not released in that territory.

== See also ==
- List of Billboard number-one dance club songs
- List of artists who reached number one on the U.S. Dance Club Songs chart
