= Double Dance =

Canadian music webzine

Double Dance Alternative Publications
- Website type: Music Website
- Available in: English
- Owner: Jody Heavener
- Website: doubledance.ca
- Launched: April 10, 2009
- Current status: Active

Double Dance, or Double Dance Alternative Publications, is a Canadian music webzine focusing on alternative music and lifestyle genres such as emo, indie, metal, hardcore, screamo, pop-punk, electronica, and ska. Articles vary by length, author, artist, and category. They generally post album reviews, conducted interviews, fashion and lifestyle articles, and photo galleries.

The website was started April 10, 2009 in Duncan, British Columbia and has quickly gained traction with a younger demographic in Canada, the United States, and Brazil as a credible source for alternative music news.

== Mentions and collaborations ==
Double Dance had one of their promotional T-shirts featured and reviewed on Chicago indie clothing website I Am The Trend's December 2009 episode of IATT.TV. Since October 2009 they have also been contributing their music reviews and interviews to I Am The Trend's music section and have been re-posted on the website multiple times.

In August 2010 Double Dance collaborated with Vancouver, BC-based cancer movement group Fuck Cancer to raise awareness of cancer and gave away a T-shirt and sticker prize to one winner who gave their reason why they were 'fucking' cancer.

== Contributors ==
All of the authors or contributors, also known as the 'Dance Crew', are contributing their work for free and are unpaid, and there are no full-time contributors. Double Dance also asks that the readers and community submit their own comments as reviews to achieve a communal opinion on the subject. There are currently contributors based in Canada, the United States, and the United Kingdom.

== Music Sampler ==
Since inception Double Dance has put out a free, downloadable compilation of music every six months, known as a sampler. Each sampler, depending on which cycle it's on, is dubbed the 'Spring Sampler' or the 'Fall Sampler'. The samplers have generally always had themes, such as 'local talent' or 'released or releasing in 2010', and have featured artists such as Jon And Roy, The Dear & Departed, and Acres Of Lions.
