= Rifflandia Music Festival =

Music festival in Victoria, Canada

Rifflandia Music Festival is a four-day multi-venue music festival held at the Royal Athletic Park in Victoria, British Columbia. With no fixed date, the festival has occurred in the month-long span between the last weekend of August and the last weekend of September. Rifflandia was first launched on August 29, 2008. In 2019 it was canceled due to "economic instability in the festival market," with the hope of returning in 2020 which did not happen either due to coronavirus.

Rifflandia also includes Artlandia, the War Child Lounge, and publishes an annual magazine. Local brewery and sponsor Phillips Brewery also produces a Rifflandia beer, Rifflandabrau, sold around the festival's time. The festival is staged by a local production company, Atomique Productions, and is sponsored by local businesses and various members of the media.

== History ==
=== 2016 ===
==== Line-up ====
===== Thursday, September 15 =====
Night Stages:

- Illvis Freshly
- The Good Guys
- The Beatnuts
- De La Soul
- Andrew Judah
- Goodwood Atoms
- Little India
- The Tourist Company
- DJ Wood
- Vespers
- Shylow
- Moontricks
- DJ Jetts
- DJ Surgery
- DJ All Good
- Bryx
- Lovecoast
- Joy District
- Baskery
- The Windowlickers
- Spaceport Union
- Wishkicker
- No Liars
- Dante Hadden
- Maverick Cinema
- Familiar Wild
- Terence Jack
- Yuk Yuk's Comedy Winners

===== Friday, September 16 =====
Night Stages:

- Sweetleaf
- Pigeon Hole
- Bomba Estéreo
- Keys N Krates
- En Noir
- Miami Nights 1984
- Hodge
- Goldfish
- Jeremy Loveday
- DJ KWE
- Shane Koyczan
- Hello Moth
- Groenland
- We Are The City
- Michael Bernard Fitzgerald
- Vince Vaccaro
- I M U R
- Windmills
- Youngblood
- Hot Panda
- Rafferty Funksmith
- Burning Rainbow
- The Gaff
- Dunks
- Akela + Tedder
- Kirtay
- Bullet Bill
- Kid Kurse
- Grizzly Timbers
- San Felix
- Dralms
- Peach Pit
- The Villanovas
- The Prettys
- Malahat
- Mesa Luna
- Bocce Avocado
- Mu
- Caveboy
- Stetson Road
- Fintan O'Brien
- Genevieve and the Wild Sundays
- Relaxation Sounds + Lil Halo
- Neon Annex
- Hermit
- Noscar
- Kyross
- Zoo Riots
- Mouth Breather
- Kermode
- Astrocolor
- Ivan Decker

Main Stage:

- The Choir
- Bomba Estéreo
- X Ambassadors
- Michael Franti & Spearhead

Rifftop Tent:

- Grossbuster
- The Elwins
- Lee Scratch Perry

===== Saturday, September 17 =====
Night Stages:

- A DJ Called Malice
- Lucas Dipasquale
- John River
- Classified
- Vortoozo
- Levi Hawk + Jay Somethin'
- Dirty Radio
- Prozzäk
- Pif Paf
- Groenland
- Caveboy
- Operators
- DJ KWE
- Daniele Mereu
- Rennie Foster
- Aux 88
- Derrival
- Kaylee Johnston
- Fake Shark
- JPNSGRLS
- DJ Low
- Applecat
- Juice
- DJ Shub
- DJ Arktic
- Primitive
- Ganjoid
- Ghostwhip
- Big Little Lions
- Morning Show
- The Katherines
- Royal Wood
- Railtown Sound System
- Wooden Horsemen
- Dope Soda
- Entagados
- Phonosonics
- Frankie
- Khari Wendell McClelland
- Sohpia Danai
- Tami Neilson
- Madness Blooms
- Big Little Lions
- Eshe Nkiru
- Fvde
- bbno$
- Immerze
- Czech Royalty
- The Carlines
- Lovers Touch
- Zoubi and the Sea
- The Wild Romantics
- Leland Klassen

Main Stage:

- The Choir
- No Sinner
- The Zolas
- Coleman Hell
- Band of Skulls
- Jurassic 5

Rifftop Tent:

- Fox Glove
- Moontricks
- Band of Rascals
- Tennyson
- The Beatnuts

===== Sunday, September 18 =====
Main Stage:

- The Choir
- Chance Lovett & the Broken Hearted
- Fruit Bats
- Jesse Roper
- Wolf Parade

Rifftop Tent:

- Fallbrigade
- Astrocolor
- Darcys
- Shane Koyczan & the Short Story Long
- Del the Funky Homosapien

=== 2015 ===
==== Line-up ====
===== Thursday, September 17 =====
Night Stages:

- Jazz Cartier
- Post Malone
- Flatbush Zombies
- Walshy Fire
- Torro Torro
- Jillionaire
- Guests
- Max Renn
- Philthkids
- Sinistarr
- Cascadia Sound
- Daniele Mereu
- Rennie Foster
- Righteous Rainbows of Togetherness
- Wild Ones
- Frog Eyes
- Coleman Hell
- Spaceboots
- Tower of Dudes
- Rugged Uncle
- Seven Year Old Poets
- Labs
- Stray Cougar
- Highs
- Storyhive Winner Alberta
- Big Goose
- Blackwood Kings
- Bodies
- Ben Rogers
- Drew Farrance & Morgan Cranny
- Darcy Collins
- James Ball

===== Friday, September 18 =====
Night Stages:

- Pigeon Hole
- The Underachievers
- Doomtree
- DJ Shrew
- AppleCat
- Onra
- A Tribe Called Red
- Jay Malinowski + the Deadcoast
- Chad VanGaalen
- Hayden
- MF Jones
- Marshall A
- DJ Murge
- The Stockers
- Class of 1984
- The Vicious Cycles
- Punk Rock Karaoke
- Big Body
- Sean Evans and Bokeh
- The Librarian
- Xxxy
- Bugatti Boys
- Bogman
- Mr. Moe
- Miami Nights 1984
- Secret Sun
- Emilie and Ogden
- Seoul
- Plants and Animals
- Sticky Fingers
- Slim Sandy
- Market East
- Little Hurricane
- Random Citizen
- Illvis Freshly
- LIINKS
- Storyhive Winner BC
- Fans and Motor Supply Co
- Chersea
- The Archers
- Steve McMath and Shane Priestly
- Evan Mumford and Myles Anderson

Main Stage:

- The Choir
- The Dears
- Arkells

Rifftop Tent:

- Blonde Redhead
- A Tribe Called Red

===== Saturday, September 19 =====
- Busty and the Bass
- Five Alarm Funk
- J Feud
- Lori the HiFi Princess
- Mat the Alien
- Longwalkshortdock
- Ria Mae
- Leisure Cruise
- Moon King
- The Zolas
- Marshall A
- Jansom
- Wood N Soo
- Marshall A
- Justin Brave + Ishkan
- Hip Hop Karaoke
- Emplicit
- Hi-Q Soundsystem
- Self-Evident
- Mumdance
- Phrase
- DJ Low
- J.F.Killah
- The Helio Sequence
- Aegis Fang
- Gang Signs
- Vogue Dots
- Man Made Lake
- Chris Ho
- Brothers
- Justine Drummond and Wes Borg
- Chelsea Lou Uphoff and Shawn Ohara

Main Stage:

- Young Empires
- Brave Shores
- Plants and Animals
- Big Data
- Tokyo Police Club
- Modest Mouse

Rifftop Tent:

- The Choir
- Dirty Radio
- Sticky Fingers
- The Zolas
- Neon Indian
- Kiesza

===== Sunday, September 20 =====
Main Stage:

- Vic High R&B Band
- The Walkervilles
- Jesse Roper
- Hollerado
- Joey Bada$$
- Mother Mother

Rifftop Tent:

- The Choir
- Grounders
- Tacocat
- Emancipator
- Julian Casablancas + The Voidz

=== 2014 ===
==== Line-up ====
===== Thursday, September 11 =====
Night Stages:

- The Numero Group
- Ratking
- Danny Brown
- Sinesthetix
- Dead Air
- Vaski
- Zeds Dead
- Oliver Swain's Big Machine
- Choir Choir Choir
- The Choir
- Adam Cohen
- Davenport
- The Wild Romantics
- The Shilohs
- Paper Lions
- Little Wild
- Smash Boom Pow
- Mark Mills
- Dralms
- Chet
- Wintermitts
- Little India
- Derrival
- Willhorse
- Letr B
- Avalon Emerson
- Max Ulis
- Tessela
- Electric Oak
- Twin Bandit
- Luca Fogale
- Fox Glove
- Noah Edwards
- Pax
- Battery Poacher
- Grossbuster
- BnW (Blondtron & Waspy)
- Darcy Collins
- Rob Pue

===== Friday, September 12 =====
Night Stages:

- The Beatnuts
- Kool Keith
- Del The Funky Homosapien
- G.I. Blunt
- Sabota
- Hrdvsion
- Tiger and Woods
- Kalle Mattson
- Old Man Canyon
- Rising Appalachia
- Jon and Roy
- Shaprece
- Ivan & Alysosha
- Horse Feathers
- Born Ruffians
- Pickwick
- MF Jones
- Miami Nights 1984
- Humans (DJ Set)
- DJ Stallion
- Speed Control
- Ellice Blackout
- We Hunt Buffalo
- JPNSGRLS
- Kate Kurdyak
- Thieves
- Good For Grapes
- Rococode
- Zerbin
- Fall Fair Car
- Lola Parks
- Paperboys and the Messengers
- Devon Coyote
- The Roper Show
- Shawn Mrazek Lives!
- Cool
- Cowards
- Needs
- Single Mothers
- Skye Wallace
- Jasper Sloan Yip
- Damn Fools
- Mindil Beach
- Transient
- Hashman Deejay
- Rennie Foster
- Graze
- Jackie Trash
- Punkerslut
- eXam
- Acab Rocky
- Sydney York
- Riiivr
- Emplicit
- Hi-Q Soundsystem
- Taal Mala
- Shawn O’Hara
- Mike Delamont

Main Stage:

- Reuben and the Dark
- We Are Scientists
- Airbourne
- Serena Ryder

Rifftop Tent:

- The Glorious Sons
- Born Ruffians
- Dragonette

===== Saturday, September 13 =====
Night Stages:

- Sims (of Doomtree)
- Zion I
- Hilltop Hoods
- DJ Applecat
- Poirier
- Addison Groove
- Paper Diamond
- DJ Tim Horner
- The Valuables
- The Ballantynes
- The Skatalites
- Windmills
- Mozart's Sister
- Kandle and the Krooks
- The Franklin Electric
- Half Moon Run
- DJ Trever
- DJ Wood
- Neon Steve
- DJ Stallion
- Astral Swans
- Raleigh
- MANcub
- Napalmpom
- Chersea
- Isobel Trigger
- Sam Weber
- Coyote
- Rich Aucoin
- 222
- Ruby Karinto
- Annie Becker
- The New Groovement
- Bocce Avocado
- Dead Soft
- Minto
- Wimps
- Maniac
- PS I Love You
- Jody Glenham
- Hunting
- Liinks
- Humans (DJ Set)
- Laggards
- Monolithium
- Michael Red
- Visionist
- Cocahala
- Close The Bombay Doors
- Bodies
- Rosie June
- David Vertesi
- Jacques Porveau
- DJ Primitive
- En Noir and Natron
- Wax Romeo
- Myles Anderson
- Ivan Decker

Main Stage:

- Choir Choir Choir
- The Choir
- Head of the Herd
- Le Butcherettes
- The Airborne Toxic Event
- The New Pornographers
- Death Cab For Cutie

Rifftop Tent:

- Kytami
- Bum
- Latyrx
- Dum Dum Girls
- Rusko

===== Sunday, September 14 =====
Main Stage:

- Zeus
- Dear Rouge
- SonReal
- To Be Announced
- Girl Talk

Rifftop Tent:

- Vic High R&B Band
- Lowell
- Lightning Dust
- Keys N Krates
- Half Moon Run

=== 2013 ===
==== Line-up ====
===== Friday, September 13 =====
Night Stages:

- Shrew
- Wood & Soo
- The Hood Internet
- The Funk Hunters
- Disco 3
- Pat Mahoney
- James Murphy
- Grossbuster
- Anomie Belle
- Weird Party
- Humans
- Watsky
- Pigeon Hole
- Serengeti
- Jel
- Mykki Blanco
- Boots Of Mischief
- GodzBallz
- Rotterdam
- Spaceboots
- J-Feud
- Monolithium
- Hrdvsion
- Ikonika
- The Carlines
- The Archers
- The Belle Game
- Dusted
- Braids
- Olav
- Hi-Q Soundsystem
- Dead Air
- Murge
- Alexandria Maillot
- HRDWTR
- Fields of Green
- Prairie Cat
- Pompadoors
- Cleopatra & The Nile
- Juvenile Hall
- Bloody Wilma
- The Mants
- Peace
- Familiar Wild
- Hannah Epperson
- Carousels
- Wand
- Versa

===== Saturday, September 14 =====
Main Stage:

- No
- Mounties
- Classified
- Courtney Love

Side Stage:

- Easy Star All-Stars
- Z-Trip
- Current Swell

=== 2012 ===
For its fifth year, Rifflandia built on the success of the Royal Athletic Park as a flagship venue, while also using night stage venues, including the return of the Market Square stage. Rifflandia V occurred on September 13–16. Headlining the festival was the Flaming Lips, Sloan, Cake, and Mother Mother.

==== Line-up ====
===== Thursday, September 13 =====
Night Stages:

- Hundy Thou
- Royal Canoe
- Kids and Explosions
- Doldrums
- Austra
- ill.Gates
- Lost Lander
- Bonehoof
- Wake Owl
- Rich Aucoin
- 5AM
- Okibi
- Graintable
- Grenier
- Kode 9
- Christopher Arruda
- Northcote
- King Dude
- Frazey Ford
- Good for Grapes

===== Friday, September 14 =====
Main Stage:

- The Xylopholks
- Rich Aucoin
- Band of Skulls
- The Flaming Lips

Side Stage:

- Brasstronaut
- The Aggrolites
- Macklemore and Ryan Lewis

Night Stages:

- AFK
- Zara Taylor
- Lazy Rich
- Morgan Page
- Rooftop Runners
- Leisure Suit
- Rykka
- Humans
- Trust
- Measureless
- Needs
- White Lung
- Indian Handcraft
- Fucked Up
- Wolfheart
- The Washboard Union
- The Chantrelles
- The Stanfields
- Transient
- En Noir
- Nina Mendoza
- Lunice
- The Wicks
- Christopher Smith
- Snowblink
- The White Buffalo
- Young Pacific
- Horse Feathers
- Hayley Sales

===== Saturday, September 15 =====
Main Stage:

- The Xylopholks
- Zerbin
- The Jezabels
- Dan Mangan
- Cake

Side Stage:

- Family of the Year
- Bright Light Social Hour
- The Stanfields
- The Dudes
- Sloan

Night Stage:

- OKPK
- Mat the Alien
- Cold Blank
- Longwalkshortdock
- The June Fiasco
- Jinja Safari
- Krief
- Nightbox
- Rennie Foster
- The Old Wives
- Vicious Cycles
- Bright Light Social Hour
- Chixdiggit
- Natron
- Monolithium
- Kevin McPhee and Ronnie Falcon
- L-Vis 1990
- Shayne Avec I Grec / Jeremy Loveday
- Kids and Explosions
- Jackson 2 Bears
- Saul Williams
- Carmanah

===== Sunday, September 16 =====
Main Stage:

- The Xylopholks
- Jinja Safari
- Current Swell
- The Head and the Heart
- Reggie Watts
- Mother Mother

Side Stage:

- The Archers
- Grand Analog
- MC Yogi
- Hey Ocean!
- Everlast

=== 2011 ===
In 2011, the fourth-annual Rifflandia restructured its venues and the festival-going experience by including the Royal Athletic Park as the flagship venue, with eight additional evening venues. The new location allowed for a main stage and side stage, as well as a partnership with local food and drink vendors, and the introduction of Rifflandia Cinema. Rifflandia IV occurred from September 22–25. The night venues included Alix Goolden Hall, Phillips Brewery, Club 9One9, the Victoria Events Centre, Lucky Bar, Metro Theatre, Wood Hall and Sugar Nightclub. The line up included City and Colour, Broken Social Scene, Cold War Kids and Mother Mother.

==== Line-up ====
===== Thursday, September 22 =====
Night Stages:

- Members of Gvyo
- Nik-Tex
- Painted Palms
- Nosaj Thing
- St. Christopher
- The Big Reds
- P.O.S
- The Coup
- City of 9s
- Jim-E Stack
- Jokers of the Scene
- LA Riots
- Circadian Kingdom
- Wool on Wolves
- Man Made Lake
- Young Rival
- Spilly Gs
- Monolithium
- Tokimonsta
- Eskmo
- The Tower of Dudes
- Freedom or Death
- Pepper Rabbit
- Braids
- Seaweed Head
- Kim Churchill
- The Archers
- We Are The City

===== Friday, September 23 =====
Main Stage:

- Dinosaur Bones
- The Cave Singers
- Ra Ra Riot
- Mother Mother
- Broken Social Scene

Side Stage:

- Randy Ponzio
- Mike Edel
- Jon Middleton
- The Besnard Lakes
- Jakarta

Night Stages:

- Provincial Archive
- Chains of Love
- Damien Jurado
- The Cave Singers
- DJ Anger
- Jeremy & Boitano
- Michael Rault
- KO
- DJ Speedy Shoes
- Wood and Soo
- Araabmuzik
- Sage Francis
- Redbird
- No Sinner
- Shuyler Jansen
- Library Voices
- Full Function
- Eames
- Poison Grade
- Eliot Lipp
- Rococode
- The Coppertone
- Malajube
- The Besnard Lakes
- Adam Barter
- Sheroams
- Lola Parks
- Mathew Barber

===== Saturday, September 24 =====
Main Stage:

- Vince Vaccaro
- Jets Ovehead
- Awolnation
- Cold War Kids
- City and Colour

Side Stage:

- Sun Hawk
- Mindil Beach Markets
- Library Voices
- Hollerado
- Ubiquitous Synergy Seeker (USS)

Night Stages:

- Wildlife
- The Dirty Mags
- Giant Sang
- J Mascis
- The Funk Hunters
- Mia Moth
- Righteous Rainbows
- Bocce Avocado
- Trouble Andrew
- Glass Candy
- Beekeeper
- The Belle Game
- Young Liars
- Acres of Lions
- Shrew & Mr. Smith
- Outsider
- XI
- Machinedrum
- Olenka
- Suuns
- Bonjay
- The Pack A.D.
- Lindsay Bryan
- Hawk and Steel
- Old Man Luedecke
- Royal Wood

===== Sunday, September 25 =====
Main Stage:

- Kuba Oms and the Velvet Revolution
- Gomez
- Blackalicious
- Daniel Wesley
- De La Soul

Side Stage:

- The Scale Breakers
- Greenlaw
- Lance Herbstrong
- The Knocks
- Felix Cartal

=== 2010 ===
The third Rifflandia Festival featured a record 165 artists over four days at 11 festival stages with approximately 3,500 attendees from September 23–26. Rifflandia III also introduced "Win!landia," a treasure hunt city-wide across Victoria, and Artlandia, an art showing in partnership with White Hot Magazine.

==== Line-up ====
===== Thursday, September 23 =====
- Liam Lux
- Maris Otter
- Maurer
- The Beat Assassins
- Rhythmicon
- Balacade
- Sunday Buckets
- Mike Edel
- Calico Mountain
- Dead Eyes Open
- Mr. Smith
- Class of 1984
- Kuba Oms
- Natron
- The Sentimentals
- Acres of Lions
- DJ Woof
- Seven Year Old Poets
- Sound and Science
- Skylo
- Brasstronaut
- DJ Rowan
- Lily Fawn's Brightest Darkest Lullabies
- The Tabla Guy
- We Are The City
- Grand Analog
- Start with the Cobra
- Mykee
- Great Bloomers
- J-Feud
- Kenzie Clarke
- Mount Kimbie
- Styrofoam Ones
- Tyger Dhula
- Forestry
- Run Like Hell
- Felix Cartal
- Current Swell
- The Hounds Below
- K'Naan
- Aesop Rock
- You Say Party
- Neighbour
- Lee Ranaldo
- Delhi 2 Dublin
- JFK (of MSTRKRFT)
- Dayglo Abortions

===== Friday, September 24 =====
- Liam Lux
- Quoia
- Super Bendy Thumbs
- Pigeon Hole
- Genevieve Rainey
- Fatso
- The Zolas
- Ryat
- My Lovely Son
- Rule 27
- Amortals
- Treelines
- Tommy Guerrero
- Sam Demoe
- Lesbian Fist Magnet
- Hot Sex & High Finance
- Clay George
- Maurice
- Monarch
- The Wicks
- Steph Macpherson
- Eames
- Mark Berube and the Patriotic Few
- Top Less Gay Love Tekno Party
- The Whitsundays
- Tunde Olaniran
- Yukon Blonde
- Megasoid
- TV Heart Attack
- Fine Mist
- Growler
- The Wooden Sky
- Longwalkshortdock
- The Keg Killers
- Jets Overhead
- Aidan Knight
- Run Chico Run
- Black Hat Villain
- Vincent Parker
- Gord Downie
- Great Lake Swimmers
- Goodbye Beatdown
- The Racoons
- Shout Out Out Out Out
- Men Without Hats
- D.O.A.
- Egyptrixx

===== Saturday, September 25 =====
- Liam Lux
- Justin Brave
- The Lytics
- Lola Parks
- Cityreal
- Liz Beattie
- Teen Daze
- Pawnshop Diamond
- Rich Aucoin
- No Don't Stop
- Aquitania
- Bells and Cannons
- Myles Black and the Pearly Whites
- Chali 2na
- Kate Miller-Heidke
- Geoff Berner
- CFC
- Children of Celebrities
- Bloody Wilma
- Reid Jamieson
- DJ Weezl
- Diamond Rings
- Times Neue Roman
- Hayley Sales
- Okay City
- The Globes
- Ariel Pink's Haunted Graffiti
- Louise Burns
- Longshanks
- Ghostkeeper
- Melissa Auf der Maur
- Hey Rosetta!
- Mindil Beach Markets
- Whale Tooth
- Michael Bernard Fitzgerald
- Hollerado
- Jon and Roy
- Tanlines
- Frog Eyes
- The Dodos
- Sarah Harmer
- The Gaslamp Killer
- Dojo Workhorse
- Ko
- Chad VanGaalen
- Kathryn Calder
- Hot Hot Heat

===== Sunday, September 26 =====
- Ballgag N’ Chain Gang
- DJ Anger
- Outsider
- Lando Rock
- Fight in the Fields
- Patience Automate
- BigMuff
- Humans
- Siclife
- The Mighty Apos
- The Big Reds
- Lazers
- Degree One
- Bucan Bucan
- Champion Sound Dee Jays
- Distance

=== 2009 ===
Rifflandia II grew with 2,500 people in attendance, with over 80 artists and more venues. Rifflandia Magazine was first published for Rifflandia II. The festival was held from September 24–27. The venues included Sugar Nightclub, Element Nightclub, Alix Goolden Hall, Metro Theatre, Market Square, the University of Victoria's Vertigo, Lucky Bar, and the Strathcona Rooftop.

==== Line-up ====
===== Thursday, September 24 =====
- The Blue Violets
- Analog Bell Service
- Christopher Smith
- Hannah Georgas
- Johnny and the Moon
- Rubik
- Timber Timbre
- KRLZ
- Dan Mangan
- Creature
- Phantogram
- Aquitania
- Sam Bradley
- Bucan Bucan
- The Racoons
- Said the Whale
- Final Fantasy
- Beach House
- Fake Shark - Real Zombie!
- Basia Bulat
- Longshanks & Kenzie
- Shad
- Fan Death
- Champion and His G-Strings
- My!Gay!Husband!
- Longwalkshortdock

===== Friday, September 25 =====
- Aidan Knight
- Vince Vaccaro
- Our Book and the Authors
- Ruby Blue
- Maurice
- An Horse
- Celebrity Traffic
- Brandi Disterheft
- Bahamas
- In-Flight Safety
- Cuff the Duke
- Acres of Lions
- Tegan and Sara
- Library Voices
- Woodpigeon
- Techromancer
- Slut Revolver
- Zeus
- Espionage
- The Dudes
- Twin Crystals
- k-os
- Mother Mother
- The Most Serene Republic
- Flash Lightnin’

===== Saturday, September 26 =====
- Sex With Strangers
- donkeydong
- Caracol
- Laura Smith
- Siclife
- Adjective
- Penderecki Quartet
- Holy Fuck
- Ookpikk
- Hank and Lily
- CHAR2D2
- The Laundronauts
- Jordan Klassen
- Bogus Tokus
- Colourbook
- B. Traits
- Jon and Roy
- Jon-Rae Fletcher
- Neoteric
- The Pack A.D.
- Jets Overhead
- DJ Longshanks
- Hey Rosetta!
- Brendan Canning (DJ Set)
- k-os (DJ Set)
- Mexican Power Authority
- Buck 65
- Pink Mountaintops

===== Sunday, September 27 =====
- Mother Mother
- Brendan Canning(DJ Set)
- k-os (DJ Set)

=== 2008 ===
The inaugural Rifflandia started as a three-day festival from August 29–31, with seven stages, 65 artists and approximately 1,500 people in attendance. The venues were organized in a showcase style and included Alix Goolden Hall, Element Nightclub, Logan's Pub, Lucky Bar, McPherson Playhouse, Royal Theatre, Smith's Pub, Sugar Nightclub and the Strathcona Rooftop.

==== Line-up ====
===== Friday, August 29 =====
- Dreamboat
- Cobras Cobras Cobras
- Man Man
- The Whigs
- VinCat
- Johnny and the Moon
- Lion Thief
- Never Never Band
- Black Mountain
- Bill Stuart
- The Paper Cranes
- Seven Year Old Poets
- Away R’io
- The Upsidedown
- The Green Hour Band
- Colourbook
- Meatdraw
- Listening Party
- You Say Party! We Say Die!
- The Walkmen
- Man Man

===== Saturday, August 30 =====
- Lord Beginner
- Kemal Evans
- Bloody Wilma
- Jon and Roy
- The Blakes
- The BE-IN (Mr. Sensitive, Luke Wolf and Shamelesson)
- Pride Tiger
- Current Swell
- Chet
- Growler
- Blitzen Trapper
- Howlin' Rain
- Tanya Tagaq
- Sam Demoe
- Handsome Furs
- Tim Horner
- Final Fantasy
- Ishkan
- Counting Heartbeats
- Verse
- Theset
- Just B
- Bison
- Brother Ali

===== Sunday, August 31 =====
- Jay Tay
- DJ Bellyfish
- Murge
- Wood and Soo
- Aidan Knight
- Degree One
- Laura Smith
- D Whiz
- DJ Z-Trip
- The Mess Around
- BNGZ N’ KRLZ
- Guy Woods
- 1900s
- Sweatshop Union
- DJ Longshanks
- Tim Finn
- ½ Alive
- The Beatnuts
- Guns N’ Bombs

== Artlandia ==
Artlandia is the art component of Rifflandia. It was launched in 2010 with Rifflandia III in partnership with White Hot Magazine, featuring a variety of artists in different galleries near and during the time of the festival. For 2012, Artlandia included the Live!Stock poster show and Headspace.

== War Child Lounge ==
The War Child Lounge was first launched during Rifflandia III in 2010. It features intimate acoustic performances from artists performing that year. All donations from the sets go directly to War Child Canada. Past performers include Hey Rosetta!, USS, Mother Mother, Jets Overhead and Melissa Auf der Maur In 2012, War Child Lounge featured Luluc, Current Swell, Rich Aucoin, Family of the Year, Hey Ocean!, Mother Mother and Frazey Ford.

== Rifflandia Magazine ==
The first edition of Rifflandia Magazine was published for the 2009 festival. It is a free publication published annually since 2009 that features profiles on the artists playing, a festival schedule and map. It also includes details on other Rifflandia events, like Win!landia, Artlandia, War Child Lounge, and Wristband Connect. In 2012, the magazine also included a Rifflandia passport and fortuneteller.
