= The Tourist Company =

Canadian rock band

Tourist Company
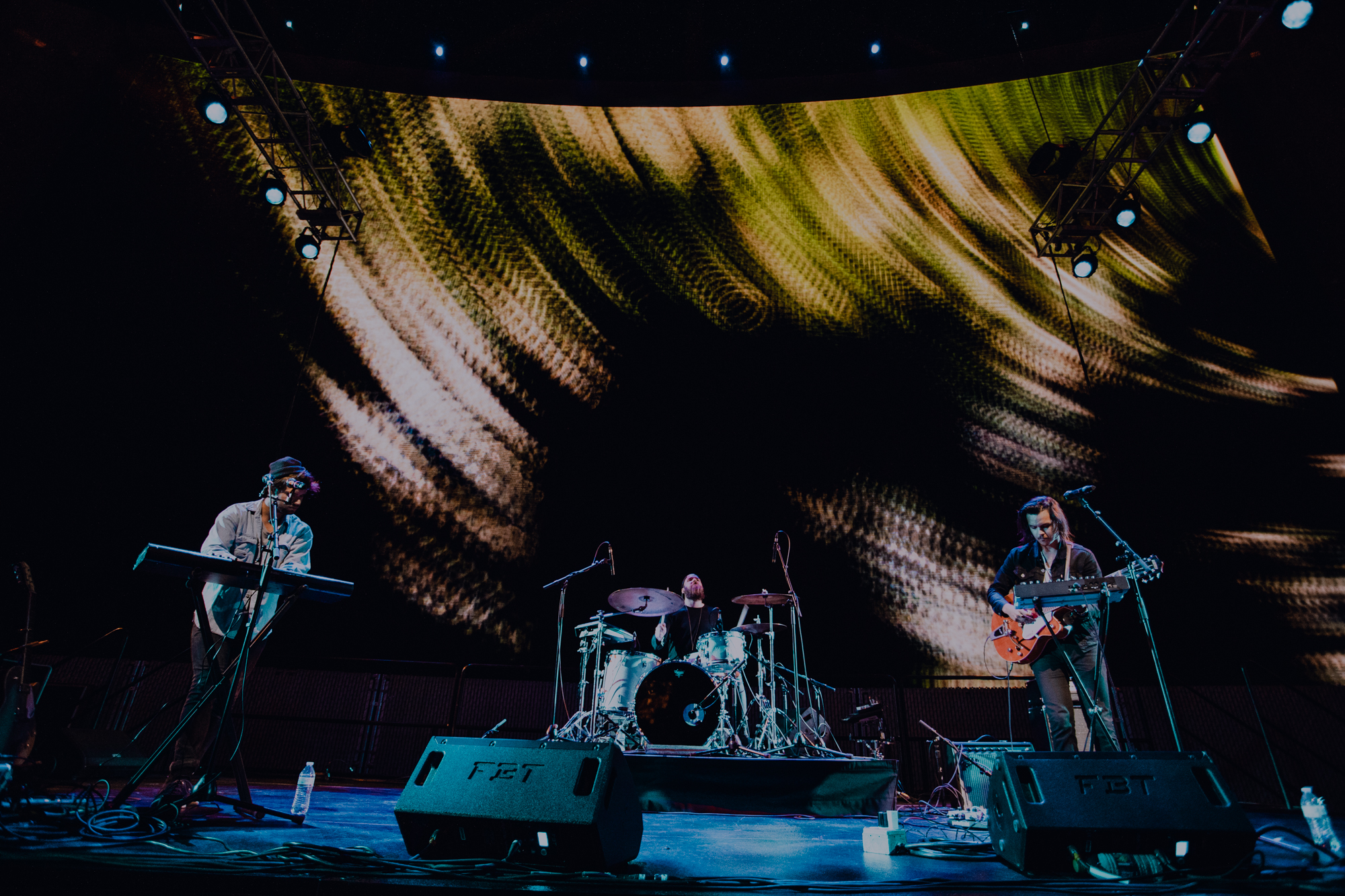
- Tourist Company performing in 2019

Background information
- Origin: Vancouver, British Columbia, Canada
- Genres: Indie pop, alternative rock
- Years active: 2013–2022
- Labels: Fierce Panda Canada; S-Music Argentina
- Members: Taylor Swindells; Brenon Parry
- Past members: Jillian Levey; Josue Quezada
- Website: touristcompany.ca

The Tourist Company (or Tourist Company) is a Canadian, Vancouver-based alternative rock band formed in 2013 by Taylor Swindells.

== History ==
Tourist Company formed after meeting at summer camp in 2013. After that they teamed up with singer-songwriter Jordan Klassen to produce and record their EP Space Race, which they released in May 2014.

In June 2014, the band was accepted into the Peak Performance Project. In November of that year, they won the $50,000 3rd place prize.

The band toured and recorded throughout 2015. Their debut single "Shouldn't Believe" was released and sent to radio on September 14, 2015. On April 29, 2016, the group released Mercury EP.

The band's second single "Pedestals" was released on August 16, 2016 ahead of their debut record, which was announced for an October 21, 2016 release date in North America. "Pedestals" broke into the Top 30 of CBC Radio 3 that September, reaching a peak of #21 on the chart. It then crossed over into the Top 20 of CBC Radio 2 at #20 on October 28, 2016. It peaked at #8 on December 1, 2016.

The group's full-length debut LP Apollo was released on October 21, 2016. It was placed on The Georgia Straight's Best Albums of 2016 list.

Their third single "Apollo" premiered on The Strombo Show on February 12, 2017, and was sent to radio on February 13, 2017. It debuted at #22 on the CBC Radio 3 Top 30 on March 13, 2017, and peaked at #5 on April 10, 2017.

Apollo was released across Europe on October 20, 2017, and featured as a NoiseTrade "New + Notable" for the same week.

On May 18, 2018, the band released a standalone song entitled "Spokane" and announced they were recording their sophomore record.

Tourist Company released "Conflicted/Restricted", the lead single from their forthcoming sophomore record, on January 25, 2019. In late June 2019, the band announced they had signed with Fierce Panda Canada and S-Music Argentina. The band released the single "Fractured State" on July 26, 2019. Their single "'Til We Disappear" was released October 11, 2019.

On May 15, 2020, the band released their sophomore record St.Helens. An ambient accompaniment to the record was released on December 4, 2020.

The band announced a hiatus on January 25, 2022, and that Taylor had signed with Nettwerk Records under his solo project Neighborhood Libraries.

== Touring ==
Tourist Company toured across Canada in 2014 and throughout 2015. In the fall of 2015, they opened for Dear Rouge and Rah Rah on select dates of the Black to Gold Tour. In the fall of 2016, they toured from Vancouver to Charlottetown, supporting their debut record Apollo. Over 2017 and 2018, the band performed select dates and festivals, and showcased in Hamburg, Germany, and Guadalajara, Mexico. They capped off 2018 as the headliners at Vancouver's New Years Eve. The band then toured across Canada in early 2019, and throughout Mexico in July 2019, before heading east to play Festival d'été de Québec.

They've also opened for artists like Said The Whale, We Are the City, The Zolas, and Dragonette. and played numerous festivals such as Canadian Music Week in Toronto, Reeperbahn in Hamburg, Germany, Upstream Music Fest + Summit and Bumbershoot in Seattle, Washington, and Rifflandia Music Festival in Victoria, BC.

== Awards and nominations ==
Year	Organization	Award	Work or author awarded	Result
2014	Peak Performance Project	3rd Place $50,000	The Tourist Company	Winner

== Discography ==
=== Studio releases ===
- Space Race (EP) (May 6, 2014)
- Mercury (EP) (April 29, 2016)
- Apollo (October 21, 2016)
- St.Helens (May 15, 2020)
- St.Helens (Ambient) (December 4, 2020)

=== Singles ===
- "Shouldn't Believe" (September 14, 2015)
- "Pedestals" (August 16, 2016)
- "Apollo" (February 13, 2017)
- "Conflicted/Restricted" (January 25, 2019)
- "Fractured State" (July 26, 2019)
- "'Til We Disappear" (October 11, 2019)
