= Black to Gold =

Studio album by Dear Rouge
- Released: March 31, 2015
- Recorded: Echoplant Studios, Coquitlam B.C., Monarch Studios, Vancouver B.C.
- Genre: Pop rock, electronic rock, indietronica, synthpop
- Label: Universal Music Canada
- Producer: Ryan Worsley, Drew McTaggart, Gavin Brown

Dear Rouge chronology
Black to Gold (2015)	Phases (2018)

Singles from Black To Gold
- 1. "I Heard I Had" Released: October 15, 2013; 2. "Best Look Lately" Released: April 22, 2014; 3. "Black To Gold" Released: February 10, 2015; 4. "Tongues" Released: June 23rd, 2015

Black to Gold is the debut studio album by Canadian electronic rock band Dear Rouge. It was released digitally on March 30, 2015, and physically on March 31, 2015. The singles from the album ("I Heard I Had", "Best Look Lately", "Black to Gold", and "Tongues") have all cracked the Top 15 on the Canadian Alternative Rock charts. The band released a sample of "Nostalgia" on March 4, 2015.

== Track listing ==
All tracks are written by Dear Rouge. "Black to Gold", "We Don't Fit Together", "Tongues", "Best Look Lately", "Kids Wanna Know", and "You Are a Ghost" are co-written with Ryan Worsley. "You Are a Ghost" co-written with Jordan Klassen. All songs produced by Ryan Worsley and Drew McTaggart. Recorded by Ryan Worsley at Echoplant Recording Studio

No.	Title	Length
1.	"Black To Gold"	4:30
2.	"Best Look Lately"	3:24
3.	"Nostalgia"	3:59
4.	"I Heard I Had"	3:09
5.	"Wanna Wanna"	4:11
6.	"October Second"	3:28
7.	"We Don't Fit Together"	3:29
8.	"Colours"	3:48
9.	"Kids Wanna Know"	4:37
10.	"You Are a Ghost"	3:47
11.	"Tongues"	3:50

iTunes Bonus Tracks
No.	Title	Length
12.	"I Heard I Had" (Acoustic Version)	2:57

== Personnel ==
- Danielle McTaggart – vocals, keys/synthesizers
- Drew McTaggart – vocals, guitar
- Ryan Worsley – various
- Maclean Carlson – drums
- Stefan Tavares – drums
- Brodie Tavares – bass
