= Peak Performance Project =

Former Canadian music initiative

The Peak Performance Project was a seven-year, $5.2 million music initiative funded by the Jim Pattison Group, to provide financial support to emerging Canadian artists in the British Columbia and Alberta markets. The $100,000 prize for the winner was one of the largest prize packages for a music competition in Canadian music history.

== History ==
The Peak Performance Project launched in 2009 by Vancouver's 102.7 The PEAK. The project wrapped up in 2015, and in the past featured over 100 artists from throughout British Columbia. The seven year Alberta PEAK Performance Project was launched in April 2014 on 95.3 The PEAK Calgary. In BC, the project is administered by the Music BC Industry Association. In Alberta, the Alberta Music Industry Association handles administration. In 2016 the Alberta format switched over to a country format, aligning itself with new station Wild 95.3 New Country.

Several notable and successful Canadian acts from a wide variety of genres have taken part in the project throughout its history, including Said The Whale, Dear Rouge, Tourist Company, The Belle Game, Jordan Klassen, Rykka, Current Swell, and We Are the City.

== Purpose ==
The purpose of the PEAK Performance Project is to assist emerging artists from British Columbia and Alberta through education, development, and promotion. The project also aims to contribute to the larger music community by building musical links between the two provinces. Each project runs separately from the other, sharing only Bootcamp time together. At the end of each project cycle, the top three bands are awarded $100,000 for 1st, $75,000 for 2nd, and $50,000 for 3rd place respectively.

== Timeline ==
The project typically launched in the spring of each year, with applications being open for a month. Applications consisted of two digital files of an artist's music, the artist's bio, an essay written by the artist on why they should be included, a live video of the band performing, and the band's current press photo. A panel of industry professionals picked the selected bands (usually 12 or 20 per province) out of a pool of hundreds of entries, and the results were announced in June of each year at a kick-off concert that featured past Peak Performance "Alumni" bands performing.

Once accepted, each band was awarded a $3,000–$5,000 (depending on the year) "Basecamp" award. The first challenge put to the bands was to spend the money in a way that immediately addressed a need in the band's career. Throughout the duration of each year's project, each band had their music featured on 102.7 The Peak in Vancouver (for BC bands), and on 95.3 The Peak in Calgary (for Alberta bands). To kick off the project officially, and introduce the bands to the public, the project featured the bands at a local festival. Throughout the summer months, the bands were given a series of challenges related to various aspects of a DIY music career and developing sections of the band's business in terms of merchandise, social media profiles, press awareness, philanthropic efforts, marketing strategies, budgeting, and self-development. In August, all bands were sent to a "Bootcamp" where they interacted with industry specialists, took courses and workshops from tutors and trainers, and performed live for experienced live coaches.

During September and October, the project put on a series of "showcases", each featuring a handful of the bands. These shows were open to the public, but also were watched by a panel of judges who gave each band a "live score" that went towards their overall mark. Public voting opened in the last week of October, and each band's percentage of the vote also went towards their overall mark. At the end of October, the bands turned in a final report which summarized the results of their aforementioned challenges, as well as a marketing and budgeting plan based on their potential winnings. A panel of judges reviewed these, and this was also factored in to each band's score.

Early in November, the top three bands were announced in no particular order during a live broadcast on 102.7 The Peak. In previous years, there was a $10,000 and $5,000 4th and 5th place prize, and these artists would be announced during this broadcast as well. The order of the winning bands was revealed after each finalist band performed at the Commodore Ballroom at a wrap up event in late November.

== Past participants ==
Below are the bands that have participated in past years, in alphabetical order, along with their hometown. Bands that placed are listed first, in order of placement. If a band did not place in the top three, they were allowed to apply for the next year's project.

=== 2009 ===
- First Place: We Are the City – Kelowna
- Second Place: The Left - Vancouver
- Third Place: Bend Sinister – Vancouver
- Adaline - Vancouver
- Adrian Glynn - Vancouver
- Alexandria Maillot - Courtenay
- Ben Sigston - Vancouver
- Bodhi Jones - Vancouver
- Danny Echo - Coquitlam
- Familia - Maple Ridge
- Freeflow - Vancouver
- Garrett Kato - Port Coquitlam
- Kuba Oms - Victoria
- Run The Red Light - Vancouver
- Sweetheart - Vancouver
- Tea - Vancouver
- The Painted Birds - Vancouver
- TV Heart Attack - Vancouver
- Wassabi Collective - Nelson

=== 2010 ===
- First Place: Kyprios – North Vancouver
- Second Place: Said the Whale - Vancouver
- Third Place: Vince Vaccaro – Victoria
- Fourth Place: Acres of Lions - Victoria
- Fifth Place: Aidan Knight - Victoria
- Adaline - Vancouver
- Behind Sapphire - Vancouver
- Ben Sigston - Vancouver
- Bodhi Jones - Vancouver
- Christina Maria - Surrey
- Christopher Arruda - Nanaimo
- Debra-Jean - Vancouver
- Greg Sczebel - Salmon Arm
- Jess Hill - Vancouver
- Kuba Oms - Victoria
- Parlour Steps - Vancouver
- Steph Macpherson - Victoria
- Yes Nice - Burnaby
- Yuca
- 41st and Home - Vancouver

=== 2011 ===
- First Place: Current Swell – Victoria
- Second Place: The Boom Booms - Vancouver
- Third Place: The Matinée – Vancouver
- Fourth Place: Hilary Grist - Vancouver
- Fifth Place: Acres of Lions - Victoria
- Ashleigh Eymann - Victoria
- Avairis - Victoria
- Behind Sapphire - Vancouver
- The Belle Game - Vancouver
- Fields of Green - West Kelowna
- Jasper Sloan Yip - Vancouver
- Lindsay Bryan - Victoria
- Maurice - Victoria
- The Never Surprise - Vancouver
- The Oh Wells - Surrey
- Rococode - North Vancouver/Victoria
- Sex With Strangers - Vancouver
- Treelines - Vancouver via Kelowna
- 41st and Home - Vancouver

=== 2012 ===
- First Place: Dear Rouge – Vancouver
- Second Place: Jordan Klassen - Vancouver
- Third Place: Dominique Fricot – Vancouver
- Fourth Place: J.P. Maurice - Vancouver
- Fifth Place: Mike Edel - Victoria
- Alexandria Maillot - Vancouver Island
- Ali Milner - Whistler
- beekeeper - Vancouver
- Facts - Vancouver
- Fields of Green - Kelowna
- Georgia Murray - Port McNeill
- Headwater - Vancouver
- Portage and Main - Vancouver
- Redgy Blackout - Vancouver
- T. Nile - Galiano Island
- Tough Lovers - Vancouver
- The Fugitives - Vancouver
- The Gay Nineties - Vancouver
- The Harpoonist & The Axe Murderer - Nanaimo
- The River and the Road - Vancouver

=== 2013 ===
- First Place: Rykka – Surrey
- Second Place: Hannah Epperson – Vancouver
- Third Place: Bestie – Vancouver
- Fourth Place: Good for Grapes – Surrey
- Fifth Place: Willhorse – Golden
- Amble Greene – Ocean Park
- Coldwater Road – Vancouver
- Greg Drummond – Port Moody
- Melissa Endean – Vancouver
- Fallbrigade – Victoria
- Luca Fogale – Burnaby
- Lydia Hol – Vancouver
- Bodhi Jones – Vancouver
- Lions in the Street – Vancouver
- Dougal Bain McLean – Victoria
- Oh No! Yoko – Abbotsford
- Rolla Olak – Vancouver
- The Lion The Bear The Fox – Ladysmith/Vancouver
- Towers and Trees – Victoria
- Van Damsel – Kamloops

=== 2014 ===
- First Place: Good for Grapes – Surrey
- Second Place: Derrival – Langley
- Third Place: The Tourist Company - North Vancouver
- Altered By Mom - Vancouver
- Damn Fools - Vancouver
- David Newberry - Vancouver
- GOODWOOD ATOMS - Vancouver
- Jodi Pederson - Vernon
- Jon Bryant - Surrey
- Miss Quincy & The Showdown - Fort St. John
- Shred Kelly - Fernie
- The Wild Romantics - Nanaimo

=== 2015 ===
- First Place: Bed of Stars - Abbotsford
- Second Place: JP Maurice - Victoria
- Third Place: Van Damsel - Kamloops
- Chersea - Port Coquitlam
- Find The Others - Bowen Island
- Jesse Roper - Victoria
- Joy District - Comox Valley
- Little India - Langley
- Mike Edel - Victoria
- Mindil Beach - Vancouver
- Smash Boom Pow - Vancouver
- Windmills - Vernon
