= RWLYD (Really Wanna Let You Down) =

Single by MONOWHALES

from the album Daytona Bleach
- Released: September 13, 2019
- Studio: Union Sound Company, Palace Sound
- Genre: alternative rock, Indie rock, rock
- Length: 3:12
- Label: TRUE Records (Independent)
- Songwriter(s): Jordan Circosta, Zach Zanardo, Sally Shaar, Holly Jamieson
- Producer(s): Ryan Worsley

MONOWHALES singles chronology
"Let It Go" (2018)	"RWLYD (Really Wanna Let You Down)" (2019)	"All or Nothing" (2020)

"RWLYD (Really Wanna Let You Down)" is the lead single from Canadian alt-rock band, MONOWHALES, off their debut album Daytona Bleach. The song is considered the band's breakout hit, reaching No. 2 on the Canadian alternative rock chart, making them the only self-managed, unsigned band to do so.

In an interview with The Harlton Empire, drummer and songwriter Jordan Circosta said "I remember us all really struggling with our mental health around the time we wrote RWLYD. There was a lot of pressure on us surrounding the release of 'Control Freak' and a lot of internal pressures in the band as we questioned the way forward. The song took shape around the idea of pushing back against those forces and the release that comes from failing to live up to unrealistic expectations."

== Track listing ==
No.	Title	Length
1.	"RWLYD (Really Wanna Let You Down)"	3:12

Acoustic
No.	Title	Length
1.	"RWLYD (Really Wanna Let You Down) - Acoustic"	3:30

== Charts ==
Chart (2020)	Peak position
Mediabase Canada Alternative Rock Chart	2
Billboard/BDS Canada Modern Rock Chart	4
