= Daytona Bleach =

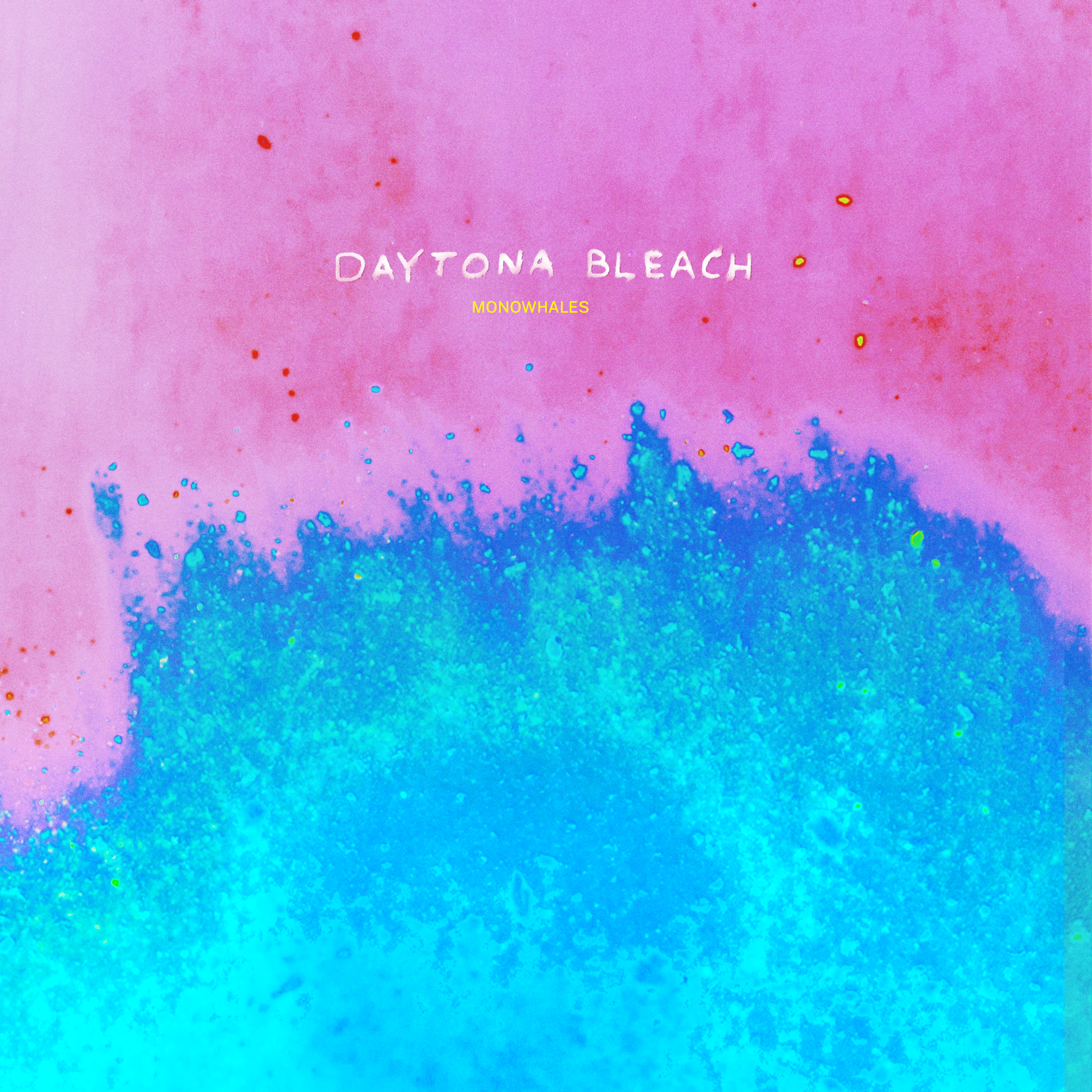

Studio album by MONOWHALES
- Released: March 5, 2021
- Recorded: Echoplant Studios, Coquitlam B.C., Union Sound Company, Toronto ON, Palace Sound, Toronto ON
- Genres: Alt rock, indie rock, rock
- Label: TRUE Records
- Producer: Ryan Worsley

Singles from Daytona Bleach
- 1. "RWLYD (Really Wanna Let You Down)" Released: September 13, 2019; 2. "All or Nothing" Released: August 28, 2020; 3. "Out with the Old" Released: January 15, 2021

Daytona Bleach is the debut studio album by Canadian alt rock band MONOWHALES. It was released digitally and physically on March 5, 2021. "RWLYD (Really Wanna Let You Down)", the first single from the album, became the first song released by an independent, self-managed band to reach No. 2 on the Canadian Alternative Rock Charts. Subsequent singles "All or Nothing" and "Out With The Old" also charted in the Top 10.

== Track listing ==
All tracks are written by MONOWHALES. "All or Nothing", "He Said/She Said (I Wait)", "BL/FF (Fake Friends)", "Out With The Old" were co-written with Ryan Worsley. "Over My Head" was co-written with Ryan Worsley and Felix Duczek. All songs produced by Ryan Worsley. Recorded by Ryan Worsley at Echoplant Recording Studio.

No.	Title	Length
1.	"All or Nothing"	3:37
2.	"He Said/She Said (I Wait)"	3:10
3.	"BL/FF (Fake Friends)"	3:15
4.	"Out with the Old"	2:51
5.	"RWLYD (Really Wanna Let You Down)"	3:12
6.	"Over My Head"	3:38
7.	"I Don't Think About U"	4:14

== Personnel ==
- Sally Shaar – vocals
- Zach Zanardo – guitar, bass guitar, keyboards, synthesizers, sound design, background vocals
- Jordan Circosta – drums, percussion, background vocals
- Holly Jamieson – synthesizers, background vocals

== Charting history ==
Song	Chart Peak
Song	CAN Alt
RWLYD (Really Wanna Let You Down)	2
All or Nothing	6
Out with the Old	5
