= Best Look Lately =

2014 single by Dear Rouge

Single by Dear Rouge

from the album Black to Gold
- Released: April 22, 2014
- Genre: Indie pop, alternative rock
- Length: 3:11
- Label: Independent
- Songwriter(s): Drew McTaggart, Danielle McTaggart, Adam Stewart, Brodie Tavares, Stefan Tavares, Maclean Carlson, Ryan Worsley
- Producer(s): Drew McTaggart, Howard Redekopp, Ryan Worsley

Dear Rouge singles chronology
"I Heard I Had" (2013)	"Best Look Lately" (2014)	"Black to Gold" (2015)

"Best Look Lately" is the third single from Canadian indie rock band Dear Rouge. In a press release, Drew McTaggart remarked about the song: "We all know of our world's endless bombardment of things to better ourselves. We hope to offer a song to people that fights back at this cultural obsession, and at the same time gives you a boost of confidence. We've always found that the people who are most content are the ones we strive to be like, more than someone who is perfect!".

== Music video ==
The music video for "Best Look Lately" premiered on MTV Canada's website on November 14, 2014. The video is a fast paced time lapse of Danielle sitting and having her makeup or "look" changed several times. Her makeup is styled after Cyndi Lauper, David Bowie, Twiggy and Lady Gaga at certain points in the video. The video ends with her makeup and hair being made more natural and Drew sitting at her side as the lights turn out.

== Charts ==
Chart (2014)	Peak position
Canadian Alternative Rock Chart	12
Billboard Canadian Rock Airplay	25
