= Astrocolor =

Canadian electronic jazz group

- Origin: Victoria, British Columbia, Canada
- Genres: Electronic, funk, space-age pop jazz, instrumental psychelelia
- Years active: 2015–present
- Labels: Amelia Recordings, Last Gang Records
- Website: www.astrocolormusic.com

Astrocolor is a band based in Victoria, British Columbia. It was founded in 2015.

The group's music style has, at various times, been described as electronic, funk, dance, psychedelic jazz, and lounge.

Astrocolor has been nominated for four Western Canadian Music Awards, winning the Instrumental Artist of the Year Award in 2022.

== Music style ==
Astrocolor has been called a "genre-blending" band that "fuses jazz, psychedelia, and electronic influences into an experimental sound". Other genres that have been used to describe the band's music include funk, dance, and lounge.

Initially, Astrocolor worked largely in the fusion of jazz and electronica. Later, it played big crowds at dance-oriented events. During the pandemic, Astrocolor made Paradise, which has a tone that "imagines the perfect tropical vacation". The band has a reputation for reinventing itself with every album.

== Band membership ==
In 2024, Astrocolor's lineup was

- Anand Greenwell (sax),
- William Farrant (bass),
- Chris MacKenzie (drums, bass, guitar),
- Andrew Poirier (guitar),
- Piers Henwood (guitar, keyboards),
- Neil James Cooke-Dallin (frontman, keyboard, producer).

Band members have included both Thomas Shields (synth) and Amrit Basi (drums) for the album Moonlighting.

Astrocolor featured vocalist Cayley Thomas on the album Paradise. Vocalist Lindsay Bryan joined the band on the album Stargazing.

== Awards ==
Astrocolor won the Instrumental Artist of the Year Award at the Western Canadian Music Awards in 2022. The band has been nominated four times for Western Canadian Music Awards, including a nomination for Best Electronic Album in 2018, and Instrumental Artist of the Year in 2025.

The band's Neil James Cooke-Dallin earned a nomination at the Western Canadian Music Awards in 2025 for Audio Engineering (through his Burning Rainbow studio).

== Discography ==
- Lit Up - Music for Christmas (2015)
- Astrocolor II (2017)
- Astrocolor III (2018)
- Hue (2020)
- Paradise (2021)
- Moonlighting - AstroJazz Vol. 1 (2023)
- Stargazing - AstroJazz Vol. 2 (2024)

== Reception ==
In 2024, Astrocolor's catalogue had over 15 million streams on the major platforms. Astrocolor has received airplay on several CBC shows including Drive and Afterdark, and on radio stations KCRW in Los Angeles and KNKX in Seattle.

The band has appeared at local and international festivals, including Burning Man, Shambhala, Rifflandia Music Festival, Laketown Shakedown, the Bass Coast Festival, and the Victoria International Jazz Festival.
