= Rich Aucoin =

Canadian indie rock musician

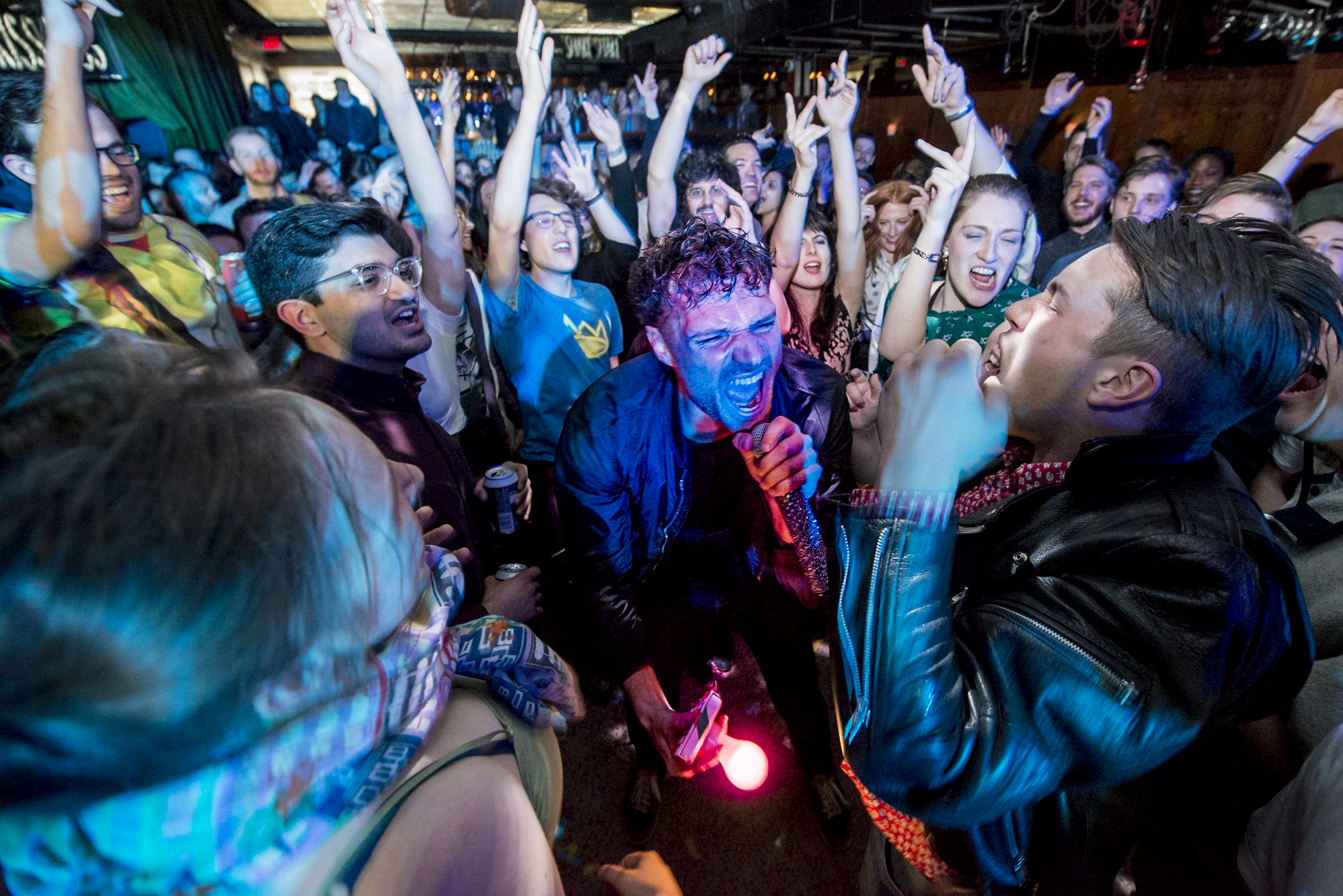
- Rich Aucoin live at the Drake Underground in Toronto in February 2018

Background information
- Born: September 15, 1983 (age 43); Halifax, Nova Scotia, Canada
- Genres: Electronic, Indie Rock, Indie Pop, Experimental Music, Orchestral
- Occupations: Musician, producer, composer
- Instruments: Piano, drums, synthesizer, bass, vocals, organ, trumpet, mallets, guitar, recorder
- Years active: 2006–present
- Labels: Sonic Records, Bonsound, Dine Alone, Haven Sounds, We Are Busy Bodies
- Members: Rich Aucoin
- Website: richaucoin.ca

Richard Aucoin (born September 15, 1983) is a Canadian musician, based in Halifax, Nova Scotia.

He has toured throughout North and South America, Europe and Australia. He employs experimental recording techniques on his albums, and is noted for audience involvement and interaction at his performances. Aucoin has released five critically acclaimed studio LPs and EPs and singles and has won several Canadian awards, including the SiriusXM Indie Awards' Emerging Artist of the Year.

Aucoin claims his albums can act as alternative scores to films, reminiscent of Dark Side of the Rainbow, which combines the film The Wizard of Oz with the Pink Floyd album The Dark Side of the Moon.

Aucoin also does cross-country bicycle touring for charity fund raising.

== Career ==
=== Education and breakthrough ===
After graduating in 2006 from University of King's College, Dalhousie University with a BA(Hons) in Philosophy & Contemporary Studies, Aucoin recorded his first EP, Personal Publication, using one microphone (a Behringer B-1) and playing over a dozen instruments. In Spring 2006 he went on tour with The Hylozoists his older brother, Paul Aucoin's band, playing vibraphone/drum set and synth. Together with Fembots and Cuff the Duke.

Inspired by a Halifax Oxford Theatre midnight screening of The Wizard of Oz's audio swapped with Pink Floyd's The Dark Side of the Rainbow phenomenon, Aucoin recorded an EP, claiming it syncs with the Dr. Seuss’ 1966 film How the Grinch Stole Christmas!. Aucoin put the video up on YouTube. It was taken down after receiving a cease and desist order from the Seuss Estate.

==== Personal Publication EP (2007) ====
Aucoin's first show was on December 20, 2006, at Tribeca in Halifax and released Personal Publication EP in 2007/2008 managed by mixing record producer Joel Waddell. The self-released EP was Aucoin's industry break-through. In spite of his success, he embarked on a cross-country cycling tour to raise money for Childhood Cancer Canada. Aucoin finished the cycling tour with 30 dates that ended in Victoria, BC from Halifax and then embarked on a tour with The Hylozoists opening for The Besnard Lakes. This was canceled after Aucoin was plagued by seizures, prompting a return to Halifax.

==== We're All Dying to Live LP (2008) ====
Aucoin's debut LP, We're All Dying To Live, sampled public domain classics including Night of the Living Dead and It's a Wonderful Life. He toured with one microphone (a Røde NT2), an Mbox, Pro Tools 32 Track LE and his laptop released in November 2011, and then performed at Halifax Pop Explosion at St. Matthew's United Church with a one-night-only band of about 80 performers. It won Best Live Show in the Past Year in that year's Best Of Awards by Halifax's The Coast Weekly. At the time, Aucoin ran half marathons for Heart and Stroke Foundation of Canada.

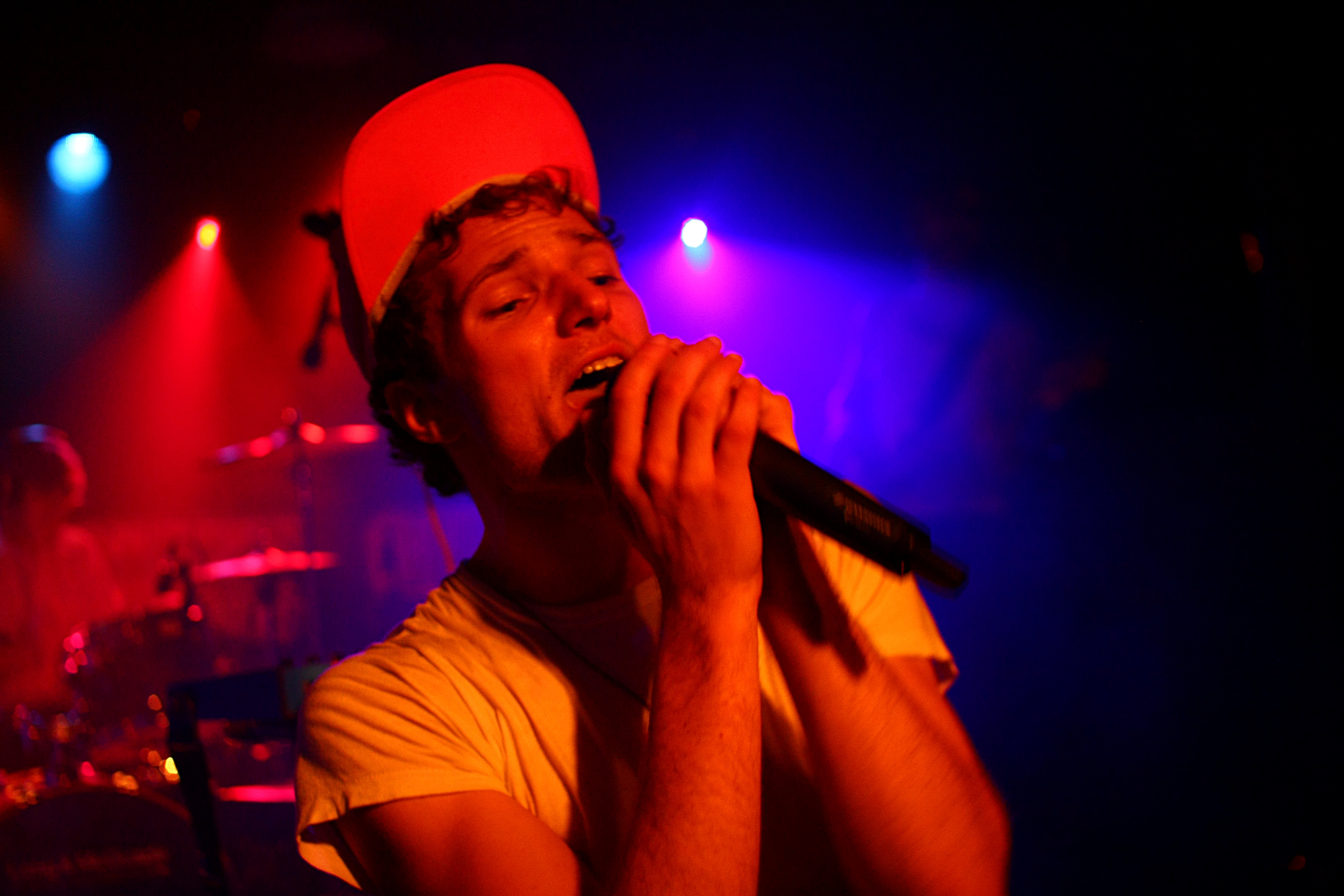
Performing in Sydney, Nova Scotia at the gala concert of the 2010 East Coast Music Awards

Associated acts of Aucoin include fellow Canadian band members that have collaborated at venues and recording studios include; Break Glass with Jace Lasek, Hotel 2 Tango with Howard Bilerman, Common Ground with Andrew Watt, Echo Chamber with David Ewenson, Halla with Paul Aucoin and at St. Mary's Basilica Cathedral with Peter Togni and a session at the famed Abbey Road Studios in London, U.K. featuring on Doug Taylor's album, mixed by David Wrench and mastered by Nilesh Patel at The Exchange and produced by Joel Waddell. The album appeared on the Campus and Community National's !earshot Top 50 Albums chart in January 2012. It was given Album of The Week by the National Post and was a longlisted nominee for the 2012 Polaris Music Prize in June of that year.

==== Ephemeral (2014) ====
Aucoin recorded Ephemeral in 2010. Aucoin decided to go back to syncing the album with just one piece of media rather than the collage of public domain films for We're All Dying to Live and so Ephemeral plays as an alt soundtrack to the 1979 Will Vinton claymation movie The Little Prince.

Aucoin recorded an audience of 20,000 of festival performances in the summer of 2012 all over Canada, US and Europe shows for Ephemeral's opening track, Meaning in Life. The album also opens with a vocal sample of Wayne Coyne from The Flaming Lips talking to Neil Fridd of Terror Pigeon (and long-time collaborator of Aucoin) about "being into long things" after Fridd and Aucoin had just gotten off stage as costumed dancers for a Lips festival show in 2011 at the Hangout Music Festival where Aucoin was also performing.

The album cover image is of the iconic Moon landing footprint and is the one image that sums up humankind's history at the Griffith Observatory in Los Angeles on their History of The Universe timeline. Recording took place at Hotel 2 Tango with Howard Bilerman, Rooster studios with Don Kerr, Echo Lake with Daniel Ledwell, Dream House with Alex Bonenfant, and St. Mary's Cathedral Basilica in Halifax, with Peter Togni.

The album was mixed by Elijah Walsh, Peter Chapman, Eric Broucek, Graeme Campbell, Graham Walsh, Stephen Paul, Daniel Ledwell and Mick Guzauski and was produced by Aucoin and Joel Waddell, mastered by Dave Cooley and Rich Aucoin. It was released by Bonsound and debuted at The Halifax Pop Explosion in 2014. featuring Maylee Todd and Allie X. Aucoin was featured on the cover of Exclaim! magazine and was nominated for The Polaris Music Prize. Major France label Platinum purchased distribution rights for both Ephemeral and We're All Dying to Live in light of Aucoin of heavy touring France and Europe.

Aucoin was privileged to perform his album song with Symphony Nova Scotia in collaboration with The Halifax Pop Explosion.

==== Release (2019) ====
Recording for Release, originally called to be called ‘Death’, started in the winter of 2016 at Old Confidence Lodge and is claimed to be in sync with Disney's 1951 film Alice in Wonderland. featuring around 70 performers such as drummer Justin Peroff of Broken Social Scene as well as Tony Dallas of Fake Shark and Bratboy and Jeremy Malvin of Chrome Sparks, vocals of Rose Cousins and Reeny Smith, acoustic guitar of Dan Mangan and the bass of Commander Meouch of TWRP.

During recording, Aucoin suffered a laptop theft of substantial recordings in January 2017 prompting remixing on backups. All album tracks features vocal synths with The Past entirely of Aucoin. Release was recorded in at Rec Room with Sheldon Zaharko. Taurus Recording with Thomas D'arcy, The Nook with David Plowman, Sonology with Jeff McMurrich, Planet Studios with Jean-Bruno Pinard, Hotel 2 Tango with Howard Bilerman, Virtue and Vice with Ben Talmi, Echo Lake with Daniel Ledwell, Old Confidence Lodge with Diego Medina, Alley Road with Lukas Pearse, Sonic Temple with Darren Van Niekerk, New Scotland Yard with Thomas Stajcer and again with Peter Togni recording church organ at Cathedral Church of All Saints and was produced by Aucoin and Joel Waddell and was mixed by Howie Beck and mastered by Noah Mintz. with the cover image of a 3D printed life-sized version of Aucoin's skull, painted by artist Laura Dawe and photographed by photographer Meghan Tansey Whitton and designed by Seth Smith.

==== United States (2020) ====
The United States album was released in May 2019 by Dine Alone Records' Haven Sounds imprint. After the album's debut, Aucoin embarked on another country cycling tour across America in Spring 2018. The album was entirely written from vocal memos while from Los Angeles to New York City raising money for Mental Health America and The Canadian Mental Health Association. Aucoin documented his tour with Paste magazine.

Unlike previous albums, this was unintended to be synced to a film, instead entirely based on emotional reception of the American landscape and society. It was written and recorded at Taurus Recording with Thomas D’arcy and Old Confidence Lodge with Diego Medina, mixed by Howie Beck and produced by Aucoin and Joel Waddell with ‘Walls’ was mixed and produced by Kevin Maher and was mastered by Brian ‘Big Bass’ Gardner. Its cover is a photo taken by Aucoin of an auto dealership's enormous American Flag flying at half-mast and was the second release by Dine Alone's Haven Sounds for Aucoin in October 2020. The first single for the record "How It Breaks" went No. 1 on the CBC Top 20 Countdown in June 2020.

Aucoin released a stand-alone single in 2022 called We're in It Together which featured a choir made up of 100 fans emailing their voice memos and home recordings to Aucoin and featured: Doctor Sung and Lord Phobos of TWRP, Ninja Brian of Ninja Sex Party and Dylan Germick of Planet Booty.

==== Synthetic: A Synth Odyssey (2022) ====
Aucoin started Synthetic: A Synth Odyssey LP in March 2020 while doing an Artist In Residency at the National Music Centre in Calgary, Alberta. Almost fully recorded, the pandemic halted recording in April 2020 so Aucoin shifted focus on music documentary No Ordinary Man directed by Aisling Chin-Yee and Chase Joynt. Aucoin played all the sum 37 synthesizers on Season 1 which was released in October 2022 by We Are Busy Bodies. and was mixed by Howie Beck and produced by Aucoin, Joel Waddell and Gordon Huntley. The album featured the legendary Tonto synthesizer made famous by Brian De Palma in his film Phantom of the Paradise and used by greatest like Stevie Wonder.

The album was mastered by Noah Mintz and designed by Mat Dunlap. The cover for each of the four seasons of the album features the synthesizers used on each one and was nominated for a Juno Award for Electronic Album of The Year.

== Media reception ==
According to The Globe and Mail, "Aucoin's sweat-soaked shows are near legendary events of mosh-pit euphoria, surfboard situations and dancing underneath a multicoloured parachute".

Aucoin might be best known for his live show in Canada. It began with Aucoin playing like a silent film era pianist on the size of the stage with the focus being on the screen he was playing the music to accompany but then slowly morphed into a communal singalong dance-party with Aucoin frequently in the middle of the audience leading the choruses.

The show has always involved a mixed media performance involving a collage of images which the show runs in sync to with everything from the films Aucoin composed the music to synchronize with to viral videos and memes to anything and everything as visual samples. These film clips include All Dogs Go to Heaven 2, in which Aucoin features. Oftentimes, the framing of a night at the movies is used with opening previews of the other bands on the bill to fake advertisements and a crowd singalong of all the major media companies’ fanfares mashed up together. Custom 3D glasses were distribute in 2009 for his sets which were partially 3D filmed.

Aucoin has been known to make a personalized show for every performance given thousands of fans personalized intro credits in the opening credits of the show; messages usually revolve around topical humor or cultural references like "So and So doesn't settle for anything, except Catan".

Aucoin has narration and other comedy elements added between songs to give time for costume changes and other props, including crowd surfing on a real surf board.

Another signature element has been the use of a multi-colored parachute which he throws over the audience and leads the singing dance party underneath. The shows have had heavy use of many other props, from water gun fights to balloon drops and usually a sea of confetti.

Group movement plays a large role, with Aucoin leading the audience through many interactive moments and large group coordination. Aucoin plays either solo with samples or with a various configuration of backing band members from all over North America and Europe. Some configurations are drums, bass, synths, guitar, horns and back up singers to having larger bands with strings and choral groups.

Reoccurring members include:

- Joel Waddell (drums)
- Darryl Smith (guitar)
- Erik VanLunen (bass)
- R Sun (keyboards)
- Nathan Pilon (saxophone)

Satellite bandmates have included:

- Tony Dallas of Fake Shark
- Phil Maloney of Hey Rosetta!
- Jeremy Malvin (professionally known as) Chrome Sparks
- Brad Weber of Caribou
- Antoine Woodmann of Monolithe Noir
- Baudouin and Guillaume Marnez of Encore

Aucoin had nearly 90 musicians join him for his album release for We're All Dying to Live at the Halifax Pop Explosion in 2011 at St. Matthew's Church. Aucoin also was backed by Choir! Choir! Choir! at The Toronto Urban Roots Festival in 2015.

Aucoin has been a promoter of the Gender Is Over! If You Want It trans-rights campaign. He has worn their tank top since 2017. Aucoin also developed a performance character in 2019 for his first shows doing support for TWRP and, keeping with the sci-fi style of the band, Aucoin developed The Space Cowboy and would enter stage to the Steve Miller Band track The Joker and its line "some people call me the space cowboy". Aucoin announced he would retire this version of the show at the end of 2025.

== Touring ==
Aucoin has toured extensively:

- America: Terror Pigeon and Gobble Gobble, Grimes, Moon King, Born Gold, TWRP and Planet Booty
- Canada: Hey Rosetta!, k-os, Lights, Arkells, Hot Hot Heat and The Mounties.
- France: Salut C’est Cool, Naïve New Beaters

Major festivals have included: Osheaga, Ottawa Bluesfest, Vielles Charrues, Eurockéennes, Calvi on The Rocks, Sakifo, Toronto Urban Roots Festival, Regina Folk Festival, Best Kept Secret, Montreal Jazz Festival, The Hangout, Trans Musicales, Berlin Music Fest, Art Basel Miami, Halifax Jazz Festival, Panorama Festival, Festival Eletronika, C/O Pop Koln, Pemberton Festival, World Pride, Victoria Jazz Festival, Rifflandia Festival, Winnipeg Folk Festival, Luminato Art Festival, Iceland Airwaves, The Great Escape Festival, Australian Music Week, Canadian Music Week, CMJ, NXNE, Sled Island Festival, Dawson City Music Festival, SXSW, and Pop Montreal.

He opened festival stages for M83, Andrew W.K., Of Monsters and Men, The National, Mavis Staples, The Flaming Lips and The Tragically Hip.

Aucoin has supported Dan Deacon, Girl Talk, Deerhoof, of Montreal, Caribou, Holy Fuck, The Constantines, The Weakerthans, July Talk, Zeus, Mac DeMarco, Plants & Animals, Rubblebucket, Peelander-Z, Austra, Tegan and Sara, A Tribe Called Red, Mother Mother, Shad, Sloan, Joel Plaskett, St. Paul & The Broken Bones, Izïa and Melissa Auf der Maur.

He holds the record as the artist who played his hometown Halifax Pop Explosion more than any other artist during its run.

== Music videos ==
Aucoin is known for his ambitious music videos:

- It (2007) involved recreating several iconic film scenes from classic films from Forrest Gump, Ghostbusters, Taxi Driver, Top Gun, The Princess Bride, E.T. the Extra-Terrestrial, Die Hard to film syncing albums. The video garnered nearly a half a million views.
- Push (2009) included an early use of 3D.
- Brian Wilson Is A.L.I.V.E. (2010) with producers Jason Levangie, Marc Tetreault and director Noah Pink. It won the Prism Prize in 2013. involved a mini biopic of Beach Boys lead songwriter Brian Wilson. which lead to Brian Wilson promoting the video on Twitter in September 2012.
- Want to Believe (2012), a live-action video directed by Jason Eisener. The concept, written by Aucoin and developed by Eisener, was a story about a washed-up supernatural detective being inspired by a group of kids to keep the dream alive and shows them on a number of episodic adventures. It was a mix of The X-Files meets The Goonies and other 80's nostalgia and was a Vimeo staff Pick.
- Yelling in Sleep (2014) with animator Joel Mackenzie. It was Prism-nominated.
- Release (2019) directed by Dave Hung, involved Aucoin floating off the coast of Nova Scotia in a suit, while a drone slowly pans out overhead. The video took several attempts at filming for the one-shot take.
- The Mind (2019) directed by Meaghan Tansley-Whitton, has a non-distinct silver-draped figure standing on a number of Nova Scotia's iconic coastlines.
- The Dream (2019) directed by Mike Bromley. Aucoin dressed as a Hollywood costumed performer. It was shot using a hidden camera, in a 'run and gun' style on Hollywood Boulevard.
- The Middle (2019) directed by Meags Fitzgerald involved time-lapse overhead filming of her ambidextrous drawing; she also used stop animation to animate the drawings. It was nominated for a Prism award.
- The Change (2019) by Hanlon McGregor & Mihaly Szabados was a theatre interpretation of a gender transition.
- The Past (2019), a 360 VR video with Pete Macdonald and AJ King and audio spatializing by Kyle Varley, has six frames of Aucoin's mouth surrounding all the sides of the viewer. The spatialization has six stems of the song which can be mixed by the viewer depending on the view of direction.
- The Other (2019) produced by Stephanie Hooker and Martin Wojtunik and co-directed by Aucoin and Ian Angus. It is a dystopian sci-fi about a planet of humanoids all distinguished by masquerade masks. The video makes use of several buildings with brutalist architecture to achieve the exteriors, as well as Douglas Trumbull-style miniatures made by Auction filmed at the beginning of the video.
- Eulogy of Regret (2020) by Dustin Harvey is a theatrical interpretation of the song's themes and is an expanded theatre-piece itself entitled How Quickly Things Change including extra verses that Aucoin wrote.
- How It Breaks, Reset and Dopamine (2020), Aucoin made found footage edited videos as U.S. editions. The subjects were: protests, gun violence and a collection of Aucoin's photography documenting his bicycle tour across America in 2018, respectively.
- Kayfabe (2020) using wrestling action figures due to the pandemic lockdown isolation.
- Walls (2020), a second video edit paying homage to iconic music videos: When Doves Cry (Prince), Sabotage (Beastie Boys), Ironic (Alanis Morissette), Like A Virgin (Madonna), Virtual Insanity (Jamiroquai), Bohemian Rhapsody (Queen), Here It Goes Again (Ok Go), Once in a Lifetime (Talking Heads), Video Killed The Radio Star (Buggles), Gangnam Style (Psy), Single Ladies (Beyoncé), Sorry (Justin Bieber), Hotline Bling (Drake), Just (Radiohead), Praise You (Fatboyslim), U Can't Touch This (MC Hammer), Take On Me (a-ha), Everlong (Foo Fighter), Smells Like Teen Spirit (Nirvana), Weird Al parody of Smells Like Nirvana. The video was nominated for a Prism Prize. It was shared by "Weird Al" Yankovic on social media.
- Space Western (2022) with Levangie of Shut Up & Colour and directors Ian Angus and Noah Pink. Shot at the Mojave desert it was based on his performance character The Space Cowboy. The video was unconventionally released as a set of theatrical trailers.

== Discography ==
=== Studio albums ===
- We're All Dying to Live (2011)
- Ephemeral (2014)
- Release (2019)
- United States (2020)
- Synthetic: Season 1 (2022)
- Synthetic: Season 2 (2023)
- Synthetic: Season 3 (2024)

=== EPs ===
- Personal Publication (2007)
- Public Publication (2010)
- Hold (2018)

=== Singles ===
- It (2011)
- Release (2011)
- Brian Wilson Is A.L.I.V.E. (2012)
- Kayfabe (2020)
- How It Breaks (2020)
- Reset (2020)
- Dopamine (2020)
- We're In It Together (2022)
- New Nostalgia (2024)
