= Jordan Klassen =

Canadian musician

- Born: Abbotsford, British Columbia
- Origin: Vancouver, British Columbia, Canada
- Genres: Indie pop; singer-songwriter; folk; baroque pop
- Occupations: Musical artist, producer
- Years active: 2009–present
- Labels: Nevado Music, Fontana North
- Website: www.jordanklassenmusic.com

Jordan Klassen is a singer-songwriter and producer from Vancouver, British Columbia.

== Life and career ==
Jordan Klassen was born in Abbotsford, British Columbia, the son of Juno Award nominated artist Lianna Klassen. After moving to Calgary in his teens and playing in various rock bands, Klassen released his solo debut Tempest and Winter in January 2009 and soon after relocated to Vancouver. While continuing to record and tour independently, Klassen released his EPs St.Brigid and Kindness. He then placed as a top three finalist in 2012's Peak Performance Project, an artist development program curated by radio station 102.7 The Peak.

In June 2013 Klassen signed to Nevado Records, and on September 24, 2013, released Repentance.

On January 22, 2016, Klassen released his single "Baby Moses". It climbed the CBC Radio 2 Top 20 to a chart peak of No. 11, and on February 19, 2016, he released his record Javelin.

After releasing the EP Curses on March 3, 2017, Klassen released his fourth full length record Big Intruder on September 17, 2017. The record garnered praise from publications like VICE and Paste.

He released "Virtuous Circle" on May 24, 2019. The music video (starring Antoine Olivier Pilon) was nominated for "Best Alternative Video – International" at the 2019 UK Music Video Awards, and was nominated for the 2020 Prism Prize. On April 3, 2020, he released "I Want to Move in to Your House", which debuted on the CBC Music Top 20 at No. 17 on May 14, 2020. Tell Me What To Do was released independently on May 22, 2020, and received praise from Exclaim.

Jordan's sixth record Glossolalia was released on April 8, 2022. The single "Niko" from the record reached No. 7 on the CBC Music Top 20. A sister record Marginalia was released October 20, 2023. The single "Overstep" was featured on CBC Music, and charted at No.7 on the CBC Music Top 20.

Klassen also produces for and writes with several other artists, including Dear Rouge, The Tourist Company, Jillian Lake, and Georgia Lee Johnson. He also has written tracks for and had his songs placed in TV and film, with credits on the soundtracks for The Sense of an Ending, Teen Wolf, Hello, My Twenties!, and Nashville.

== Awards and nominations ==
Year	Organization	Award	Work or author awarded	Result
2012	Peak Performance Project	2nd Place $75,000	Jordan Klassen	Won
2019	UK Music Video Awards	Best Alternative Video – International	Virtuous Circle	Nominated
2020	Prism Prize	Grand Prize	Virtuous Circle	Nominated
2020	Western Canadian Music Awards	Video Director of the Year	Farhad Ghaderi for Virtuous Circle	Won
2021	Miami Short Film Festival	Best Music Video	Identivacation	Won

== Discography ==
=== Singles ===
- "Go To Me" (July 9, 2013)
- "Firing Squad" (November 18, 2014)
- "Baby Moses" (January 22, 2016)
- "Yer Cure" (July 14, 2017)
- "Virtuous Circle" (May 24, 2019)
- "I Want To Move in to Your House" (April 3, 2020)
- "Milk and Honey" (October 28, 2021)
- "Niko" (February 4, 2022)
- "Cocoon" (July 21, 2023)
- "Live Another Life" (August 11, 2023)
- "Overstep" (October 20, 2023)

=== Studio releases ===
- Tempest and Winter (January 2, 2009)
- St.Brigid (EP) (August 7, 2010)
- Kindness (EP) (February 6, 2012)
- Repentance (September 24, 2013)
- Javelin (February 19, 2016)
- Curses (EP) (March 3, 2017)
- Big Intruder (September 17, 2017)
- Tell Me What To Do (May 22, 2020)
- Glossolalia (April 8, 2022)
- Marginalia (October 20, 2023)
- Sparrow (EP) (November 7, 2025)
