= I Heard I Had =

Single by Dear Rouge

from the album Black to Gold
- Released: October 15, 2013
- Genre: Indie rock, alternative rock
- Length: 3:11
- Label: Independent
- Songwriter(s): Drew McTaggart, Danielle McTaggart
- Producer(s): Howard Redekopp, Ryan Worsley

Dear Rouge singles chronology
| "Thinking About You" (2012) | "I Heard I Had" (2013) | "Best Look Lately" (2014) |

"I Heard I Had" is the second single from Canadian indie rock band Dear Rouge. The song has been considered the band's breakout hit, climbing to #3 on the Canadian alternative rock chart without any label or release backing it. In a press release, lead singer Danielle McTaggart said "The lyrics of the song are about a person who has 'fires' (corruption, crimes, etc.) all around them, yet do not want to put them out. They know that they will be caught eventually, but enjoy it so much that they do not want to put them out." The band has also said that the song was partly inspired by the TV series Breaking Bad. For 2014 it was the most played alternative rock song of the year in Canada behind only Kongos and Arctic Monkeys.

== Charts ==
| Chart (2014) | Peak position |
|---|---|
| Canadian Alternative Rock Chart | 3 |
| Billboard Canadian Rock Airplay | 13 |
