= Monowhales =

Canadian alternative rock band

- Origin: Toronto, Ontario, Canada
- Genres: Alternative rock; indie rock
- Years active: 2017–2024
- Labels: TRUE; LAB
- Past members: Sally Shaar; Jordan Circosta; Zach Zanardo; Holly Jamieson
- Website: monowhales.com

Monowhales (stylized in all caps) were a Canadian alternative rock band from Toronto, Ontario. Originally called Ginger Ale & the Monowhales, their lineup consisted of lead vocalist Sally Shaar, drummer Jordan Circosta, and guitarist Zach Zanardo.

To date, they have released two studio albums, Daytona Bleach (2020) and their most recent, Tunnel Vision (2022). The group are best known for their 2019 song, "RWLYD (Really Wanna Let You Down)", which broke Canadian radio records as the highest charting single by an independent musical act ever, reaching #2 on the Canadian Alternative Rock Chart.

At the 2022 Juno Awards, Monowhales were named the winners of Breakthrough Group of the Year.

On April 9, 2024, the band announced that they would be disbanding.

== History ==
The band (originally called Ginger Ale & the Monowhales) made their debut as a four-piece band in 2017 with their first single "Take It Back", produced by Al-P of MSTRKRFT, which went on to peak at #25 on the Mediabase Canada Alternative Rock Chart. This was followed by the six-song EP Control Freak on June 1, 2018. Three songs off Control Freak were featured in Season 1, Episode 5 of 2020 Netflix series Spinning Out, which also included a cameo appearance by the band.

After spending the latter half of 2018 touring, the band flew British Columbia-based producer Ryan Worsley to Toronto to record new material. The resulting single "RWLYD (Really Wanna Let You Down)" was released on September 13, 2019. Overwhelming support from Canadian alternative rock radio propelled the single to #2 on the Mediabase Canada Alternative Rock Chart, making Monowhales the only independent band in Canadian radio history to reach that high on the chart. Between dates on their subsequent cross-Canada tour during 2019, the band spent two weeks living above Worsley's Echoplant Studios in Port Coquitlam, British Columbia, working on material for their pending debut album. On July 30, 2020, founding member and synth player, Holly Jamieson announced she had left the band to pursue a career in music therapy. The group would continue as a trio, following Jamieson's departure.

Monowhales' debut album Daytona Bleach was released on March 5, 2021. Due to the COVID-19 pandemic, the band promoted the release using storefront displays and guerrilla projection installations around their hometown of Toronto. Later that year, the band released a cover of the Nine Inch Nails song "The Hand That Feeds" and announced their label TRUE Records had signed a distributed label deal with Warner Music Canada.

In January 2022, Monowhales announced a national tour supporting Mother Mother in April/May 2022. The band released a new single "CTRL^^^" along with a music video on February 4, 2022, and announced that a new album "Tunnel Vision" was slated for release that fall. Soon afterwards, Monowhales won the Juno Award for Breakthrough Group of the Year at the Juno Awards of 2022. Soon afterwards, Monowhales performed at Osheaga Festival, Festival d'été de Québec, Hillside Festival, and more before embarking on a cross-Canada headline tour that fall.

In the summer of 2023, Monowhales performed at Ottawa Bluesfest before touring as direct support to Grandson on the Canadian leg of his I Love You, I'm Trying world tour. Immediately afterwards, the band released a new song entitled "Hear Me Out" and announced a tour of the USA and Canada for fall 2023.

On April 9, 2024, Monowhales released a statement on their social media accounts announcing that they would be breaking up. They stated that they "no longer feel we can do justice to the vision of MONOWHALES we set out with", but shared that each member has "exciting endeavours ahead".

== Members ==
Former

- Sally Shaar – lead vocals (2017–2024)
- Zach Zanardo – guitar, bass, synthesizer, backing vocals (2017–2024)
- Jordan Circosta – drums, percussion, synthesizer, backing vocals (2017–2024)
- Holly Jamieson – synthesizer, backing vocals (2017–2020)

Touring

- Dylan Burrett – bass, backing vocals (2022–2024)
- Gina Kennedy – bass, backing vocals (2021–2022)

== Discography ==
=== Studio albums ===
Title	Details
Daytona Bleach	Released: March 5, 2021; Label: TRUE Records; Formats: Vinyl, CD, digital download
Tunnel Vision	Released: September 9, 2022; Label: TRUE Records; Formats: CD, digital download

=== EPs ===
Title	Details
Control Freak	Released: June 1, 2018; Label: TRUE Records; Formats: CD, digital download
Who's There to Hear Me Out?	Released: January 18, 2024; Label: TRUE Records; Formats: CD, digital download

=== Singles ===
Title	Year	Peak chart position	Album
Title	Year	CAN alt.	Album
"Take It Back"	2017	25	Control Freak (EP)
"Real Love"	2018	31	Control Freak (EP)
"Let It Go"	2018	32	Control Freak (EP)
"RWLYD (Really Wanna Let You Down)"	2019	2	Daytona Bleach
"All or Nothing"	2020	6	Daytona Bleach
"Out with the Old"	2021	5	Daytona Bleach
"The Hand That Feeds" (Nine Inch Nails cover)	2021	30	Non-album single
"CTRL^^^"	2022	8	Tunnel Vision
"Song 2" (Blur cover)	2023	—	Non-album single
"Hear Me Out"	2023	10	Who's There to Hear Me Out? (EP)
"Backbone"	2023	—	Who's There to Hear Me Out? (EP)

=== Other charted songs ===
Title	Year	Peak chart position	Album
Title	Year	CAN alt.	Album
"StuckInTheMiddle"	2022	22	Tunnel Vision
"RICH$$$"	2023	7	Tunnel Vision

== Awards and nominations ==
Year	Organization	Award	Work or author awarded	Result
2019	Canadian Music Week	Jim Beam INDIES Award (Best Alternative Artists or Group of the Year)	MONOWHALES	Winner
2019	Forest City London Music Awards	Ontario Indie Recording Artist of the Year	MONOWHALES	Winner
2022	Juno Award	Breakthrough Group of the Year	MONOWHALES	Won
