= Ocie Elliott =

Canadian folk music duo

- Origin: Victoria, British Columbia, Canada
- Genres: Indie Folk
- Years active: 2017–present
- Label: Nettwerk Music Group
- Members: Jon Middleton; Sierra Lundy

Ocie Elliott is a Canadian indie folk music duo from Victoria, British Columbia, featuring Jon Middleton and Sierra Lundy. They've released three albums, six EPs, and several singles, with four million monthly listeners on Spotify, accounting for over a billion streams.

The band got its name after Middleton, inspired by Lundy's obsession with the 1920s, found "Ocie Cleve" in a 1920s name generator and combined it with the first name of American singer/songwriter Elliott Smith. They cite Gillian Welch, John Prine, Bob Dylan, and Simon & Garfunkel as their biggest influences.

== History ==
As a child, Lundy sang in the school choir, although she was more focused on sports. Her dad, however, wanted her to become a musician. Lundy attended art school in New Brunswick, Canada. Middleton's father played acoustic guitar, often on camping trips, inspiring his interest in music.

Lundy and Middleton met in 2016, when Middleton performed solo at a cafe on Salt Spring Island, where Lundy worked. They began dating soon after. A month into their relationship, Lundy's sister and a friend insisted that Middleton and Lundy play music together. They felt an instant connection and synergy as bandmates after they performed their rendition of "Look at Miss Ohio" by Gillian Welch. Initially, they only performed cover versions of songs—which included tunes by Simon & Garfunkel, John Prine, Milky Chance, and Beach House—in coffee shops and restaurants, before they started writing their own music.

Ocie Elliott released their self-titled EP, Ocie Elliott, in 2017. In early 2019, they signed a recording contract with Vancouver-based Nettwerk Music Group. Their 2023 single, "Down by the Water," went Platinum in Canada. Bungalow, their third album, was released October 2025.

They've had three songs included in episodes of Grey's Anatomy: 2019's "Run to You," 2022's "The Less We Know,” and 2025's “Younger Days.” Series like New Amsterdam, Doc, Legacies, The Rookie, The Good Doctor, and A Million Little Things have also featured songs by Ocie Elliott.

Ocie Elliott were featured in Season 2 of CBC Music Presents: Live At Massey Hall, which aired on November 14, 2024.

Middleton is also a vocalist and guitarist in the band Jon and Roy.

=== Tours ===
Ocie Elliott have opened for Zach Bryan at Red Rocks as well as Gregory Alan Isakov, and have toured with Hollow Coves, Sons Of The East, Kim Churchill, and Joshua Radin. They have also performed at Edmonton Folk Festival in 2022 and 2026, Newport Folk Festival as well as Bonnaroo in 2024, and in 2025, the Calgary Folk Fest and Pickathon.

== Discography ==
=== Albums ===
- We Fall In (February 8, 2019)
- In That Room (March 20, 2020)
- Bungalow (October 24, 2025)

=== EPs ===
- Ocie Elliott (September 22, 2017)
- Tracks (July 17, 2020)
- Slow Tide (March 12, 2021)
- A Place (August 27, 2021)
- What Remains (September 23, 2022)
- Know the Night (November 24, 2023)
