= Current Swell =

Canadian indie rock band

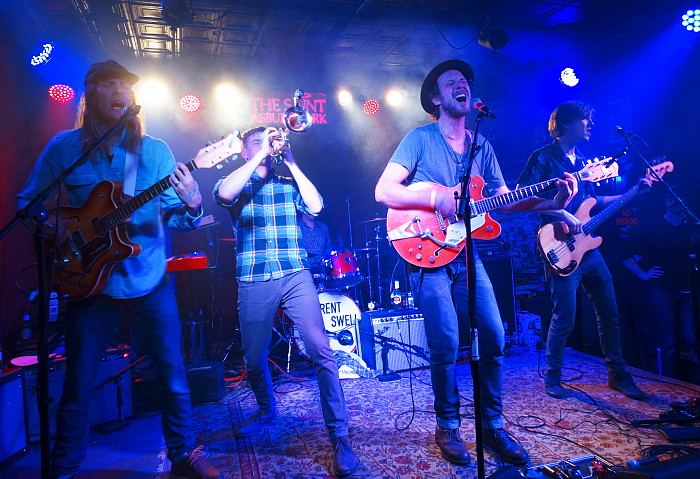
- Current Swell on stage at The Saint in Asbury Park, NJ April, 2018

Background information
- Origin: Victoria, British Columbia, Canada
- Genres: Indie Folk, Indie Rock, roots, blues, reggae, ska
- Years active: 2005–present
- Label: Nettwerk
- Members: Scott Stanton; Dave Lang; Louis Sadava; Chris Petersen
- Past members: Ghosty Boy; Mike Quirke, Kyle Robinson
- Website: currentswell.com

Current Swell is a Canadian indie rock band from Victoria, British Columbia, Canada. The band has released seven albums; So I Say, Trust Us Now, Protect Your Own, Long Time Ago, Ulysses, When to Talk and When to Listen and Buffalo.

== History ==
Originally a group of friends hanging out, jamming, and writing music, the band began performing in backyards and on beaches, and has gained popularity through its online presence and dedicated Internet fan base. The band has been noted for its authenticity and for remaining true to its upbeat folk roots.

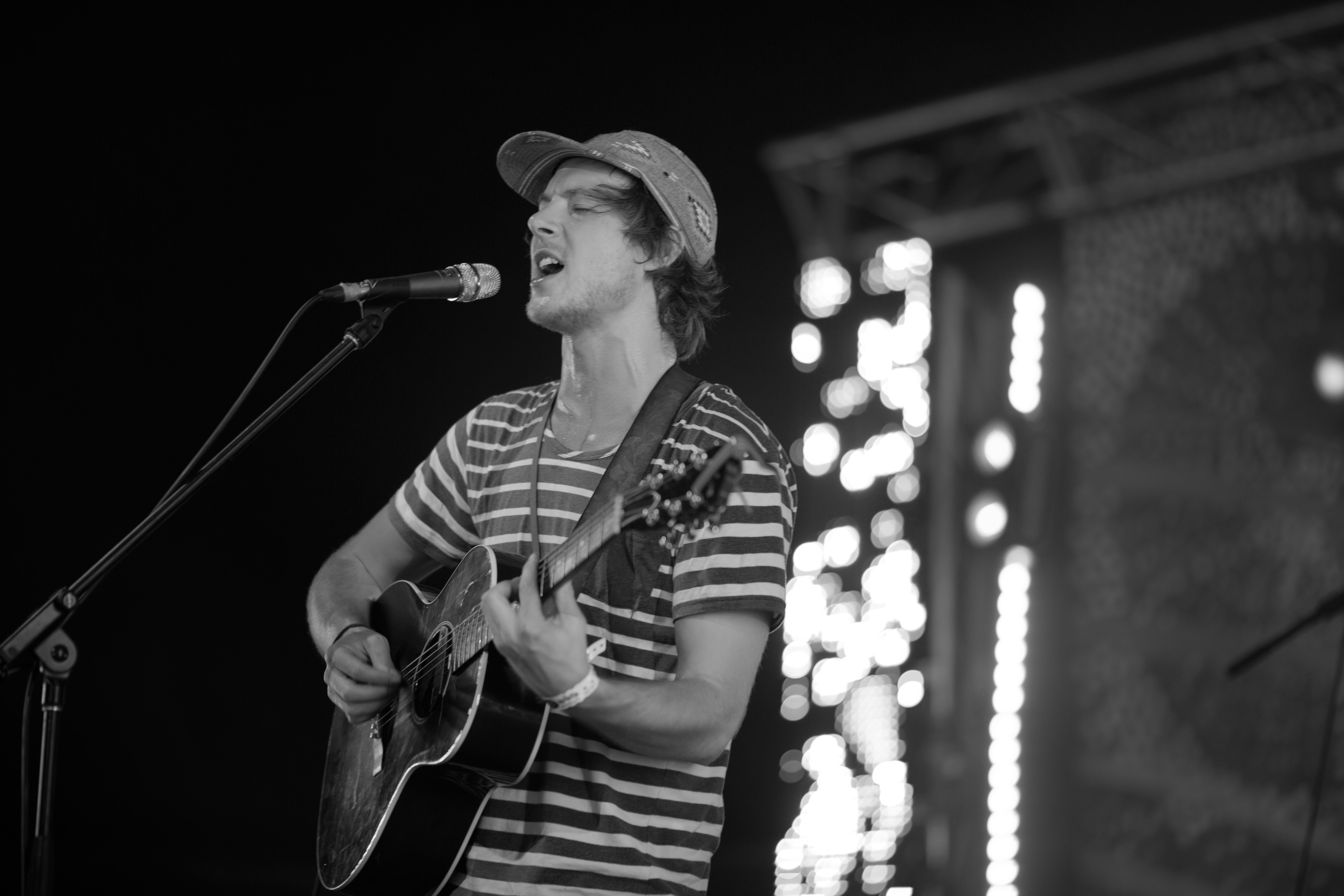
Current Swells's Scott Stanton performing at Peats Ridge 2012

Current Swell sold out the very first show they played as a band. They had released a short, five-song EP on the internet that was discovered by northern Vancouver Island high school students. The band had booked a show at a local coffee shop in hopes of playing in front of a few people but ended up playing in front of a packed audience.

The band credits much of their success to their fans, particularly the online community. Their song Young and Able (2009) became an Internet hit through its popularization on YouTube. The Internet has contributed significantly to the Canadian west coast band's large following in South America, particularly Brazil, where it headlined in Rio de Janeiro and São Paulo in 2012.

Current Swell has opened for bands like The Beach Boys, Xavier Rudd, Dispatch, Bedouin Soundclash, and The Beautiful Girls, and has made appearances at the 2010 Winter Olympics and the Ottawa Bluesfest.

In 2011, Current Swell placed first at Vancouver's Peak Performance Project, winning the $100,500 top prize. The band also played one of the largest concerts of its kind in Victoria at a Canada Day concert for 45,000 people at the British Columbia Legislature.

The band's sound combines the musical styles of folk, rock, roots, blues, reggae, and ska; it has also been described as "surf rock."

In 2014, it was announced that the band would be releasing their fourth studio album on May 6, entitled Ulysses. The album was produced by Nathan Sabatino (Dr. Dog, White Rabbits) at Vancouver's Greenhouse Studios. The first single was the third track on the album, called "Rollin'". "Rollin'" is also featured in the Teton Gravity Research-Anthill Films 2015 film unReal.

=== Influences ===
The band's albums So I Say, Trust Us Now, and Protect Your Own were inspired predominantly by their experiences traveling. However, the people in the band's life–friends, strangers, and fans who have been a part of their journey and development as artists, influenced the album Long Time Ago.

== Discography ==
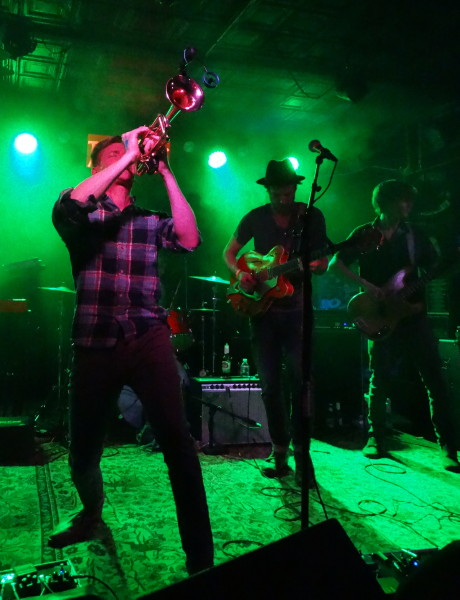
Current Swell at The Saint in Asbury Park, NJ on 04072018

=== Studio albums ===
- So I Say (2005)
- Trust Us Now (2007)
- Protect Your Own (2009)
- Long Time Ago (2011)
- Ulysses (2014)
- When to Talk and When to Listen (2017)
- Buffalo (2019)

=== Extended plays ===
- At Home (2004)

=== Compilation appearances ===
- Vancouver 125 (2011) Song: "Granville Town"
- Paste Holiday Sampler (2012) Song: "Christmas Alone"
- Isn't This World Enough - A Nettwerk Christmas (2012) Song: "Christmas Alone"

== Personnel ==
- Scott Stanton – vocals/lead guitar/slide guitar
- Dave Lang – vocals/guitar/harmonica
- Louis Sadava – bass/vocals
- Marcus Manhas – drums
- Phil Hamelin – keys/trumpet
- Dave St. Jean – trombone

== Extended family ==
- Evan Miller – guitar/vocals
- Marty Parr – tour manager extraordinaire
- Morgan Brooker – management
- Stephen Franke – management

== Previous members ==
- Chris Petersen – drums/vocals
- Mike Quirke – drums
- Ghosty Boy – bass

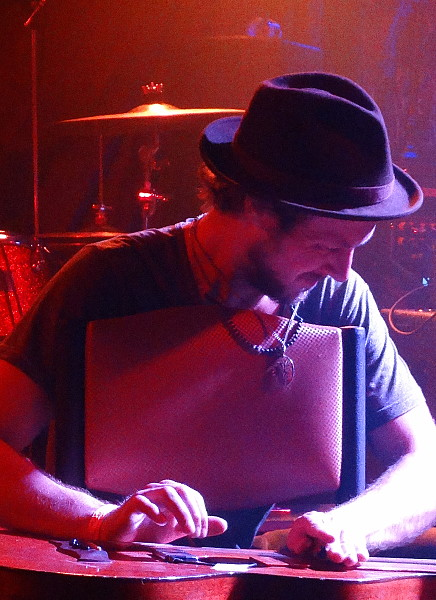
Scott Stanton at The Saint, April 2018

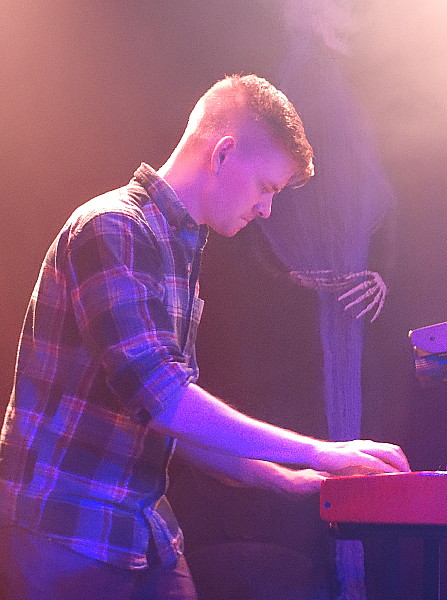
Phil Hamelin at The Saint, April 2018

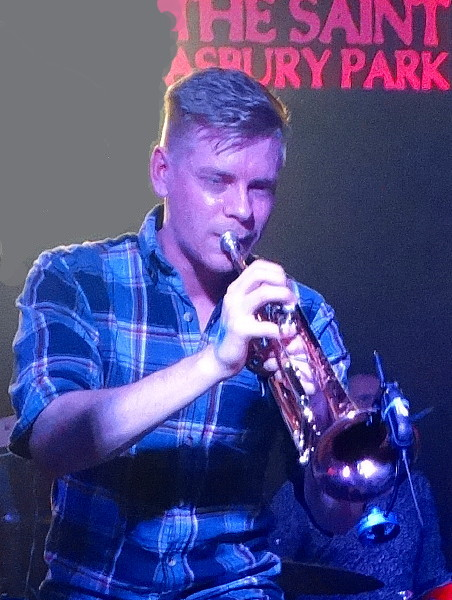
Phil Hamelin at The Saint, April 2018

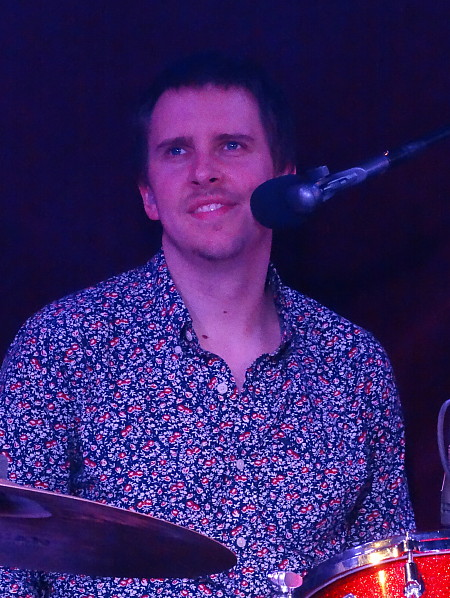
Chris Peterson at The Saint, April 2018

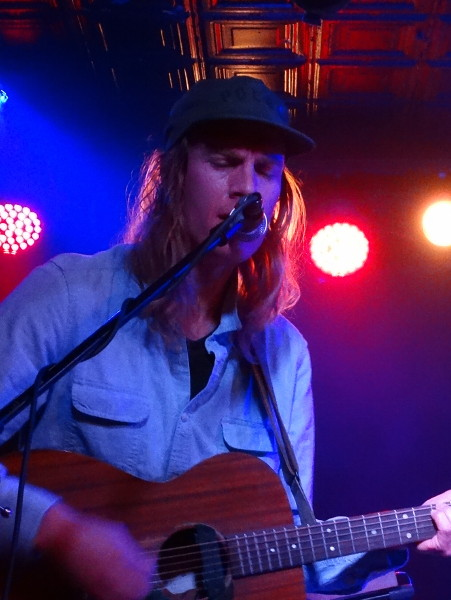
Dave Lang at The Saint, April 2018

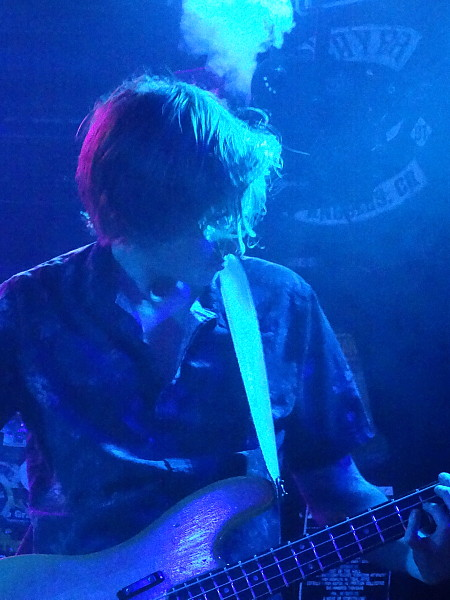
Louis Sadava at The Saint, April 2018
