= Ryan Worsley =

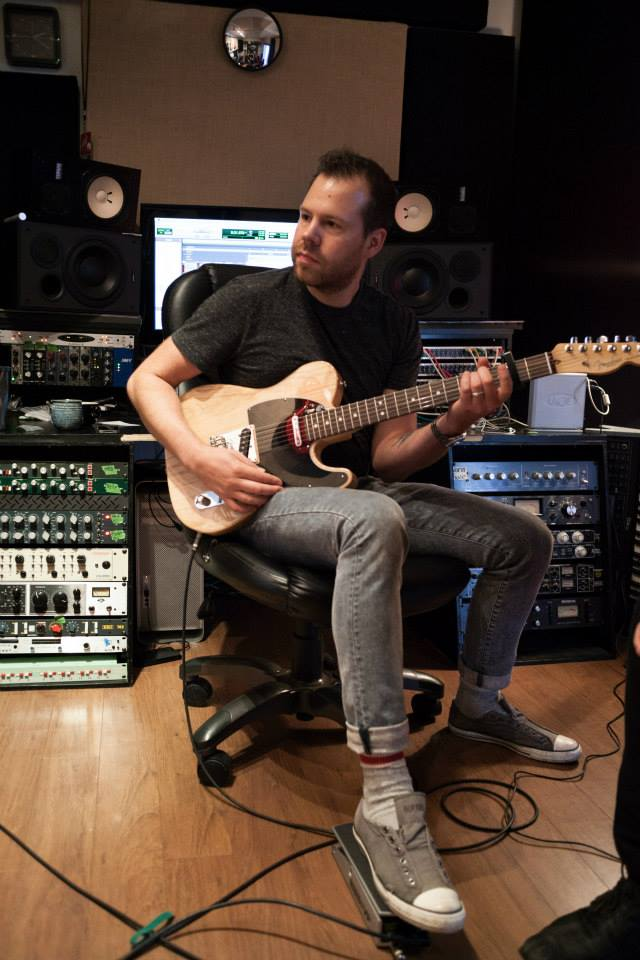

Background information
- Born: Ryan James Worsley
- Origin: Vancouver, British Columbia, Canada
- Genres: All types
- Occupations: Record producer, recording engineer, mixer, songwriter, musician
- Instruments: Guitar, bass, keyboards, drums, sequencing
- Years active: 2005–present

Ryan Worsley is a Canadian record producer, recording engineer and songwriter based in Vancouver, British Columbia.

== Career ==
Worsley started Echoplant Recording Studios in 2007 and in 2015 purchased the former Vogville Studio. He has worked with artists including Juno award winners Dear Rouge and MONOWHALES, The Treble, Juno nominated Nuela Charles, The Written Years, Sophia Danai. Worsley's collaborations with Dear Rouge have included production and engineering on their 2015 debut album Black to Gold and their 2018 second album PHASES. In 2017, Ryan participated in the "Mix with the Masters" seminar with producer Tchad Blake.

== Awards and nominations ==
Year	Award	Result
2020	Juno Awards – Recording Engineer of the Year	Nominated
2018	Western Canadian Music Awards – Producer of the Year	Winner
2018	Western Canadian Music Awards – Audio Engineering Award	Nominated
2017	Western Canadian Music Awards – Audio Engineering Award	Nominated
2016	Western Canadian Music Awards – Audio Engineering Award	Nominated
2015	Western Canadian Music Awards – Recording Engineer of the Year	Winner
