= Jon and Roy =

Canadian three-piece folk rock and reggae band

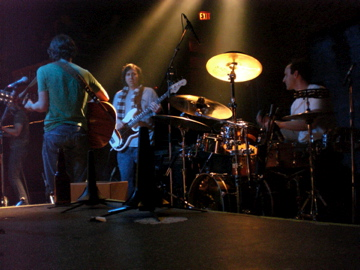
- Jon and Roy at the original Richard's on Richards venue, in Vancouver on January 23, 2009.

Background information
- Origin: Victoria, British Columbia, Canada
- Genres: Folk rock, reggae
- Years active: 2003–present
- Members: Jon Middleton; Roy Vizer; Louis Sadava
- Past members: Ryan Tonelli; Dougal McLean
- Website: jonandroy.ca

Jon and Roy is a Canadian three-piece folk rock and reggae band from Victoria, British Columbia.

== Career ==
Singer-songwriter and guitarist Jon Middleton—who is also vocalist and guitarist in the band Ocie Elliot—and percussionist Roy Vizer met at University of Victoria. They formed Jon and Roy, and began performing around Victoria and Vancouver in 2003. They added multi-instrumentalist Dougal Bain Mclean in 2004 and recorded their first album, Sittin' Back, in 2005 with recording engineer & producer Stephen Franke.

After traveling together in Australia, Jon and Roy went on hiatus from 2006 to 2007, during which Middleton recorded the solo album, After A Trip, while McLean and Vizer relocated to Vancouver. In 2007, Jon and Roy reformed and the duo recorded the album Another Noon, once again with Stephen Franke, at Blue Heron Studios. The album's title track was featured in a Volkswagen TV commercial that ran for nine months across the United States, giving the group considerable profile in that country. The success of the album also spawned the YouTube hit "Little Bit of Love".

In April 2010, Jon and Roy released Homes. Reviewers stated the music "wants you to get outside, enjoy the sunshine and leave all your material possessions behind." Homes earned them further airtime and exposure, as well as a placement in a six-month Scotiabank ad campaign, in addition to a headlining performance on Canada Day.

With the fourth album, Let It Go, the band were deemed notable, by some critics, for their "folk sound, their light swing rhythm and their predominant use of acoustic instrument." Their fifth LP, By My Side, released in 2014, was written during jams at Roy Vizer's house.

In 2026 they released I Can Dream, and undertook a tour of Europe and North America alongside songwriter Garrett Kato. The album's EP single More Than I Can Dream was recorded on tape, a first-time experience for the artists that allowed them to create a vibe and looseness to the track "as if it would be performed live" due to the necessity of a single take.

== Discography ==
=== Albums ===
- 2005 Sittin' Back
- 2008 Another Noon (2009 US)
- 2010 Homes
- 2012 Let It Go
- 2014 By My Side
- 2015 Riverside
- 2017 The Road Ahead is Golden
- 2019 Here
- 2021 Know Your Mind
- 2024 Restore
- 2026 I Can Dream
