= Acres of Lions =

Canadian rock band

- Origin: Victoria, British Columbia, Canada
- Genre: Alternative rock
- Years active: 2006–present
- Labels: Cordova Bay Records; Bullion Records (Japan); Fierce Panda (UK); Alcopop! (UK)
- Members: Jeff Kalesnikoff; Tyson Yerex; Dan Ball; Shane Deyotte
- Past members: Cody Beer; Lewis Carter
- Website: acresoflions.com

Acres of Lions is a four-piece Canadian Alternative rock band from Victoria, British Columbia, made up of Jeffrey Kalesnikoff (guitar and vocals), Tyson Yerex (guitar, keyboards, vocals), Dan Ball (bass), and Shane Deyotte (drums).

== History ==
In 2008, Acres of Lions signed a recording contract with Victoria-based Cordova Bay Records.

The band's debut album, Working, was released on February 10, 2009, and distributed in Canada by Fontana North. In 2012, it was issued in Japan by Bullion Records. The album generated three radio singles: "Closer", "Let's Get Sentimental", and "Dance Sequence". Working was recorded in Victoria by Adam Sutherland and mixed by Warne Livesey.

On September 13, 2011, Acres of Lions released their second full-length album, Collections, also on Cordova Bay Records. The album was recorded in Victoria by Adam Sutherland and the first single, "Reaction", was mixed by Mike Fraser. "Reaction" reached #19 on the Canadian Alternative Rock Chart and later went on to take third place in the Pop/Top 40 Category of the 2012 International Songwriting Competition. Collections was also issued in Japan in 2012 by Bullion Records and came out in Europe and the United Kingdom on November 26, 2012, as a joint release by Fierce Panda Records and Alcopop! Records.

Acres of Lions recorded their third album, Home(s), in Toronto at Rattlebox North Studios with producer/engineer Brian Moncarz (Moneen, Circa Survive, the Reason). Home(s) was released in Canada on April 2, 2013, and in Japan on April 10, 2013. The first single from the album on Canadian radio was "Bright Lights".

Music by Acres of Lions has appeared on the TV show Degrassi and on the 2009 Teletoon series Majority Rules! The band composed the theme music for the 2014–2015 TV series Hearing Voices, and their song "Better Luck Next Year" was used in the third season (2014) of the TV series Arctic Air.

Acres of Lions have performed at numerous music festivals, including Canadian Music Week, JunoFest, Edgefest, Halifax Pop Explosion, Rifflandia Music Festival, BreakOut West, Rock The Shores, New Music West, and Bristol's Fear of Fiction Festival. They have toured throughout Canada numerous times, including a national tour with Ten Second Epic in 2011. In April 2012, the band travelled to London, England, to perform several concerts and then returned in November 2012 to tour in support of the release of Collections. They toured again in 2013 to promote Home(s).

== Associated acts ==
Guitarist Tyson Yerex is a former member of Victoria band Moneyshot. Jeffrey Kalesnikoff and Dan Ball used to play together in a band called Accident Scene. In February and March 2010, Yerex played guitar and keyboards with Florida band Against Me! on their North American tour.

== Awards and accolades ==
Acres of Lions was selected as one of the top twenty artists in British Columbia in the 2010 and 2011 Peak Performance Project, placing fifth in 2011.

In November 2010, the Times Colonist newspaper named them one of the top ten bands in Victoria.

== Band members ==
Current

- Jeffrey Kalesnikoff – guitar, vocals
- Tyson Yerex – guitar, keyboards, vocals
- Dan Ball – bass
- Shane Deyotte – drums

Past

- Cody Beer – drums
- Lewis Carter – drums

== Discography ==
Studio albums

Year	Information
2009	Working: Release Date: February 10, 2009; Label: Cordova Bay Records; Label: Bullion Records, Japan (January 2012); Format: CD, digital download
2011	Collections: Release Date: September 13, 2011; Label: Cordova Bay Records; Label: Bullion Records, Japan (March 2012); Label: Fierce Panda Records/Alcopop! Records, UK & Europe (November 26, 2012); Format: CD, digital download
2013	Home(s): Release Date: April 2, 2013; Label: Cordova Bay Records; Label: Bullion Records, Japan (April 10, 2013); Format: CD, digital download

Singles

Year	Information
2009	"Closer": Release Date: January 6, 2009; Label: Fierce Panda; Format: digital download
2010	"Never Surrender": Release Date: October 12, 2010; Label: Cordova Bay Records; Format: digital download
2011	"Reaction": Release Date: August 9, 2011; Label: Cordova Bay Records; Format: digital download
2013	"Bright Lights": Release Date: February 12, 2013; Label: Cordova Bay Records; Format: digital download
