= Dear Rouge =

Canadian indie rock band, formed 2012

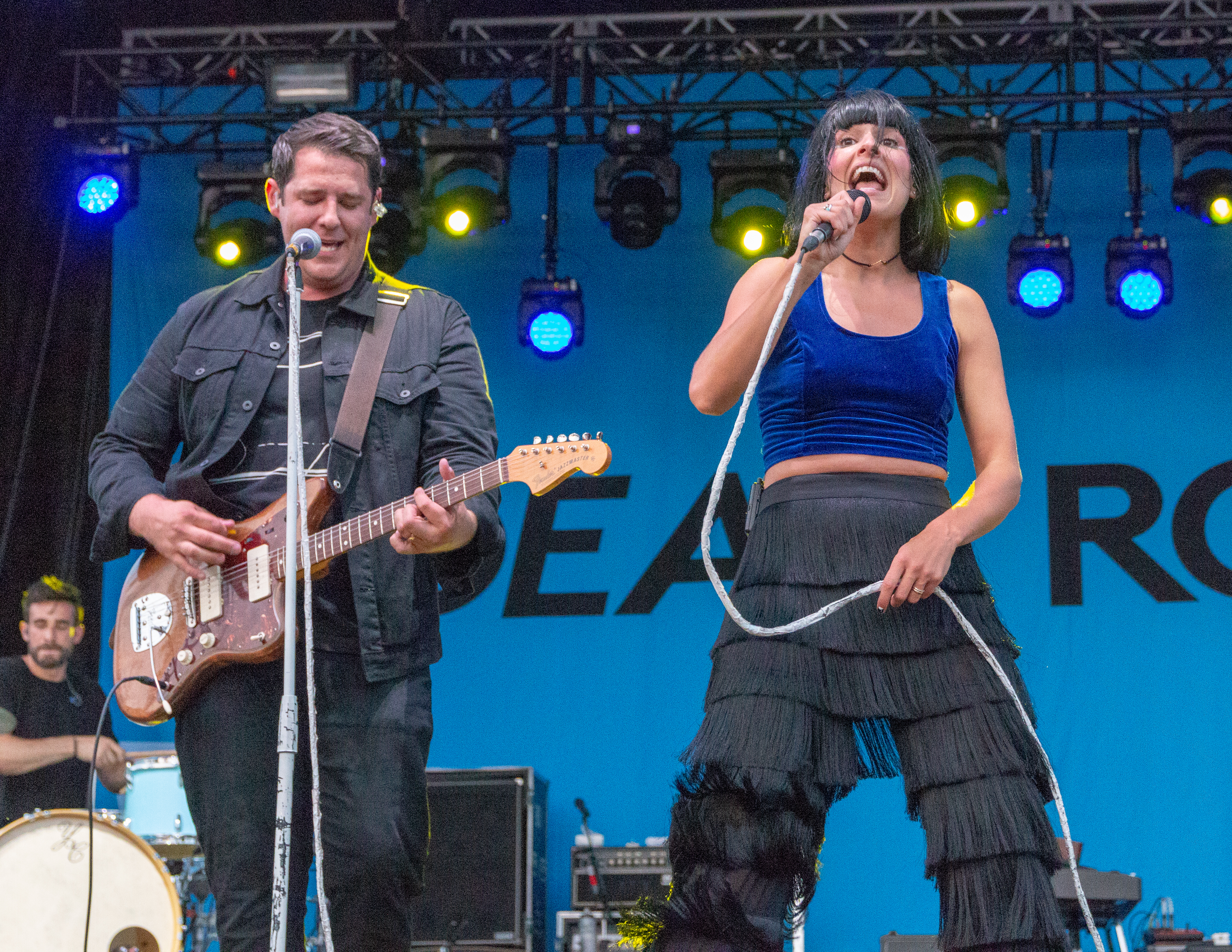

Background information
- Origin: Vancouver, British Columbia, Canada
- Genres: Alternative rock, rock
- Years active: 2012–present
- Labels: Universal Music Canada, Cadence Music Group
- Members: Danielle McTaggart; Drew McTaggart
- Website: www.dearrouge.com

Dear Rouge are a Juno award-winning Vancouver-based alternative rock band formed in 2012 by Drew and Danielle McTaggart.

== History ==
=== Formation and early years ===
Drew (born on June 3, 1984 in Langley, B.C.) and Danielle McTaggart née Heykants (born on February 21, 1984 in Red Deer, Alberta) were both touring musicians under separate projects. They met while in their early touring days and began dating before getting married and starting Dear Rouge. The name of the duo is derived from the name of Danielle's home town of Red Deer, "dear" being a homophone of deer and "rouge" meaning red in French. Danielle had previously been in a duo called Gaetz Ave, named after a street in Red Deer, and then a solo venture called Elle. Drew was a member of Vancouver indie circuit band Maclean.

In April 2012, Dear Rouge independently released their debut EP Heads Up! Watch Out!, a four-song EP on their Bandcamp page, and followed up six months later with their second EP Kids Wanna Know.

In November 2012, Dear Rouge won CA$102,700 (equivalent to $138,300 in 2025) as the grand prize winners of the Peak Performance Project put on by the Music BC Industry Organization and CKPK-FM radio station in Vancouver.

In June 2013, Exposure Contest and Dear Rouge partnered up to present a video editing contest in support of their single, "Thinking About You", from their Kids Wanna Know EP. The contest drew a wide social media spread, accumulating hundreds of entrants from around the world.

=== Black to Gold (2013–2016) ===
Dear Rouge released their single "I Heard I Had" on October 14, 2013.

Excerpt of "I Heard I Had"

In March 2014, "I Heard I Had" charted at #3 in Alternative Rock (Mediabase), #3 in Modern Rock (Mediabase), and at #13 in Canadian Rock (BDS radio). The song also won the 2015 SOCAN Songwriting Prize, an annual competition that honours the best song written and released by 'emerging' songwriters over the past year, as voted by the public. The band released their second single "Best Look Lately" on April 22, 2014. As of September 2014, it had also cracked the Top 20 of the Canadian Alternative Rock and Modern Rock charts.

The band then signed to the Canadian branch of Universal Music Group in October 2014, and announced that their debut album Black To Gold will be released through them in early 2015. The band's next single, title track "Black To Gold", was sent to radio on January 13, 2015. The single was made available digitally on February 10 along with a pre-order for the album.

On February 2, the band announced March 30th as the release date for the album and a tour with Arkells. As of May 2015, "Black To Gold" had hit #2 on the Canadian Alt-Rock charts. Their final single from Black To Gold, "Tongues", was sent to radio on June 23, 2015, and charted on Canadian Alternative Rock throughout summer 2015.

Dear Rouge recorded the title song for the Canadian TV series Private Eyes a cover of the Hall and Oates song of the same name.

On April 2, 2016, Dear Rouge won the Juno Award for Breakthrough Group of the Year, and also performed "I Heard I Had" on the live broadcast on April 3, 2016.

That year, Danielle McTaggart also contributed vocals to David Vertesi's song "Solid Ground", on his album "Sad Dad Cruise Ship".

=== PHASES (2017–2019) ===
Dear Rouge spent most of 2017 touring while writing and recording their second album. They worked with several notable producers and writers, including Tawgs Salter, Sterling Fox, and Steve Bays.

The first single from the duo's second record, "Boys & Blondes", was released on October 27, 2017. It debuted on the Canadian Alternative Rock Charts at #20 on November 7, 2017. As of February 2018, it had peaked at #6.

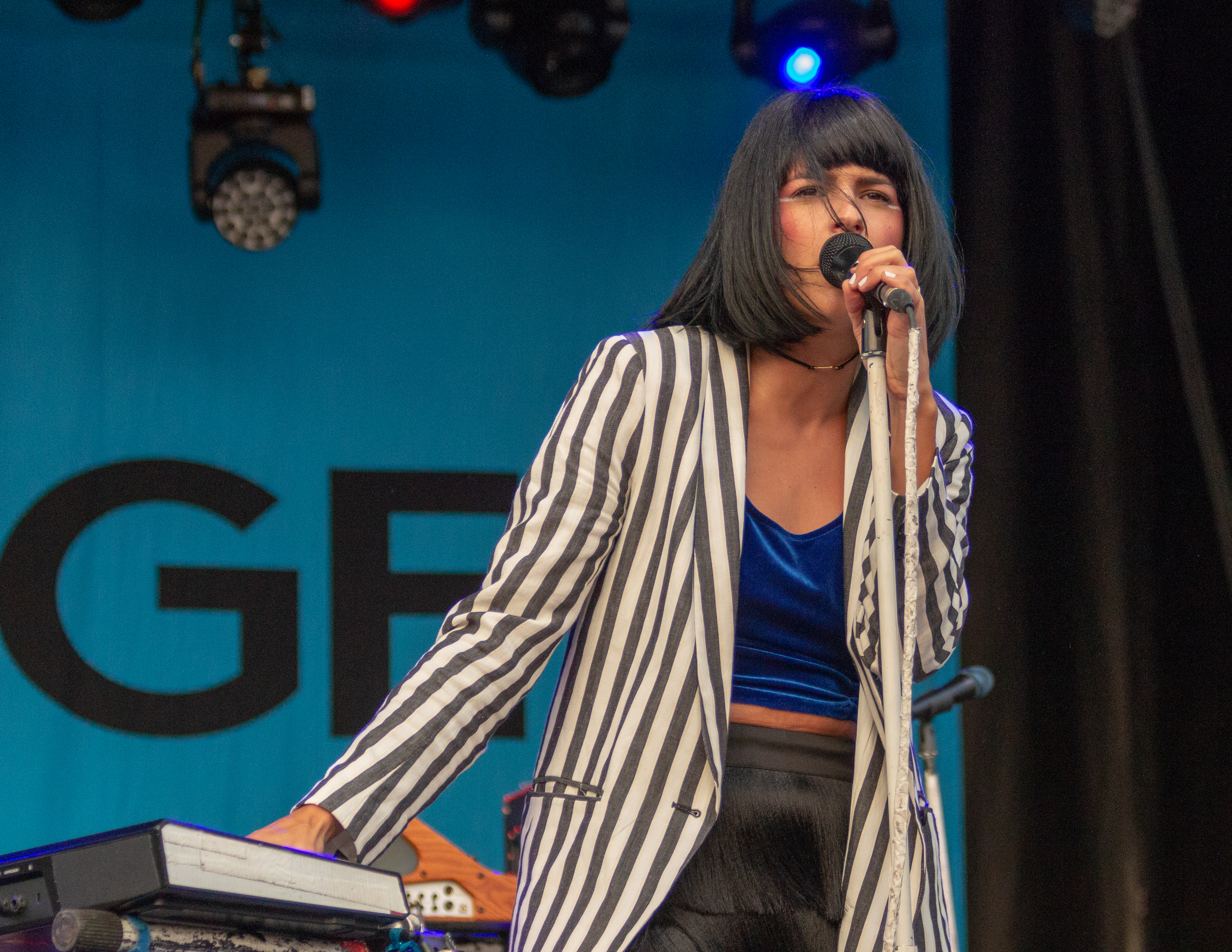
Dear Rouge performing live in 2018

On February 2, 2018, the duo announced their second record PHASES would be released on March 9, 2018. It was released to positive reviews from music publications including Exclaim! and The Spill Magazine. The album peaked on the NACC 200 at #32, and on the NACC Electronic at #9.

The second single from PHASES, "Live Through The Night", was sent to radio in May 2018. Dear Rouge announced a string of festival tour dates for the summer which was followed by their fall 2018 headlining tour with Modern Space as support. "Live Through The Night" became the band's first single to hit #1 on the Canadian Alternative Rock Charts on August 13, 2018.

Dear Rouge won Pop Artist of the Year and Songwriters of the Year for the PHASES track "Chains" at the 2018 Western Canadian Music Awards.

On March 9, 2019, the band released a deluxe version of PHASES to celebrate the 1 year anniversary of the record. The deluxe version featured the same 10 track listing plus 5 additional previously unreleased tracks; "Please Don’t Ever Settle Down", "MINE", "Basic", "Never Satisfied", and "Wanna Love". Dear Rouge then supported Arkells on the western USA dates of the Rally Cry Tour.

=== Spirit (2020–2022) ===
Dear Rouge appeared on a virtual "Canada Day House Party" festival alongside Sam Roberts Band, Dean Brody and more on July 1, 2020. The band also hosted online shows playing their records front-to-back, and mentioned they were working on new music. Over the spring of 2021 the band shared across their social media they were in the studio working on their third full-length record.

On September 1, 2021, the band shared a teaser clip across their social media and announced their new single "Fake Fame" will be released September 10, 2021. The single debuted on the Canadian Alternative Rock Charts at #26. As of January 24, 2022, it had hit #1 on the Canadian Alternative Rock Charts, the band's second single to do so.

Another new single, "Life Goes By And I Can't Keep Up" was released on October 27, 2021, along with a music video.

On January 28, 2022, the band announced their new album Spirit will be released April 8, 2022, and will contain 12 tracks. They also released the song "Small Talk" from the record along with the announcement.

Alongside the release of Spirit, the single "Gimme Spirit" was serviced to radio. Dear Rouge then supported Metric across Western Canada in August 2022.

The band announced they will be touring across Canada in the winter of 2022 with Hotel Mira as support.

=== Lonesome High (2023–present) ===
Dear Rouge appeared at various festivals throughout Canada over 2023, including Sommo Festival, and Area506. The band appeared on the CBC's Canada Day nationwide broadcast, playing their track "Gimme Spirit" from Calgary, Alberta. The band also shared on their socials that they were working on a new record at Giant Studios in Toronto, Ontario, with Gus van Go.

The band released their new single "Goon" on March 8, 2024, the first single from their upcoming new record. The band then released the track "Too Close To The Heat" on April 26, 2024, and announced their new record Lonesome High would be out September 13, 2024. Another new track "Not Afraid To Dance" was released June 7, 2024 ahead of the band's summer tour dates. "Goon" hit #1 on the Canadian Alternative Rock charts on July 8, 2024; the band's third single to do so.

Following the release of Lonesome High, the track "Cutting Teeth" was sent to radio. Dear Rouge announced they would be touring Canada in support of the record in early 2025. "Cutting Teeth" hit #5 on the Canadian Alternative Rock charts and with "Garbage" hitting #27 on the Canadian Billboard charts (with the video filmed at Slab City, California ) at the end of 2024,. The band toured across Canada in early 2025.

== Touring ==
The band toured across Canada in the spring of 2013, and again in the winter of 2013, also covering Western Canada with a number of shows supporting Lights. In March 2014, the band announced another cross Canada tour supporting Fast Romantics. Throughout the summer of 2014, Dear Rouge played a number of festivals across Canada including Edgefest in Toronto, Otalith in Ucluelet, Shorefest in Vancouver, X-Fest in Calgary, Sonic Boom in Edmonton, and Rifflandia in Victoria.

The band toured Canada supporting Phantogram and Mounties throughout December 2014. The band supported Arkells on their Winter Canadian tour dates throughout Canada over February and March 2015. Summer 2015 saw them play festivals across Canada again, including the inaugural Wayhome Festival. Throughout the fall and winter of 2015, Dear Rouge headlined venues across Canada with Rah Rah and sold out many notable venues including Commodore Ballroom in Vancouver and Mod Club in Toronto. They then toured Europe in December 2015. They spent 2016 mostly writing and recording, but appeared at summer festivals like Field Trip in Toronto, and Osheaga Festival in Montreal. Dear Rouge played select dates and festivals through summer 2017.

Dear Rouge played at SXSW 2018 and then supported Lights throughout Canada in the spring of 2018. Throughout the summer of 2018, Dear Rouge played notable slots at major festivals such as Rock The Shores in Colwood, British Columbia, Ottawa Bluesfest, Riverfest Elora, and the inaugural SKOOKUM Festival in Vancouver, British Columbia. Their headlining PHASES release tour began in Saskatoon, Saskatchewan, Canada, in September 2018 and ended in Seattle, Washington, in mid-November 2018.

The band supported Arkells on the US West Coast dates of their Rally Cry Tour through March 2019. Over the summer months, Dear Rouge played several festivals across Canada, including the inaugural Squamish Constellation Festival, and Osheaga in Montreal. The band then supported Our Lady Peace, Bush, and Live on the revival of the Summersault Festival. Dear Rouge capped off 2019 performing at the Grey Cup Festival in Calgary, Alberta.

Dear Rouge returned to playing live shows in 2021 with a performance at the Calgary Stampede. Over the summer of 2022, Dear Rouge supported Vance Joy in Vancouver and Toronto, played festivals across British Columbia and Ontario, and then toured across Western Canada supporting Metric. The band then headlined a tour across Canada with sold out shows in St.Catharines, Toronto, and Victoria.

== Awards and nominations ==
Year	Organization	Award	Work or author awarded	Result
2012	Peak Performance Project	Grand Prize Summit Award	Dear Rouge	Winner
2013	Shore 104	Best of BC	Dear Rouge	Winner
2013	CBC Bucky Awards	Most Dynamic Duo	Dear Rouge	Nominated
2014	CASBY Awards	Favourite New Artist	Dear Rouge	Nominated
2015	Canadian Radio Music Awards	Best New Group or Solo Artist: Rock	Dear Rouge	Nominated
2015	SOCAN	SOCAN Songwriting Prize	"I Heard I Had"	Winner
2016	Juno Awards	Breakthrough Group of the Year	Dear Rouge	Winner
2017	Western Canadian Music Awards	Pop Artist of the Year	Dear Rouge	Nominated
2017	Western Canadian Music Awards	Recording of the Year	Black to Gold	Nominated
2018	Western Canadian Music Awards	Pop Artist of the Year	Dear Rouge	Winner
2018	Western Canadian Music Awards	Recording of the Year	PHASES	Nominated
2018	Western Canadian Music Awards	Songwriter(s) of the Year	"Chains"	Winner
2022	Indies	Group or Duo of the Year	Dear Rouge	Winner
2022	Indies	Song of the Year	"Fake Fame"	Nominated
2022	Western Canadian Music Awards	Rock Artist of the Year	Dear Rouge	Nominated
2023	Western Canadian Music Awards	Recording of the Year	Spirit	Nominated
2025	Western Canadian Music Awards	Rock Artist of the Year	Dear Rouge	Nominated
2025	Western Canadian Music Awards	Video Director of the Year	Zachary Vague - "Goon"	Nominated

== Discography ==
=== Studio albums ===
- Heads Up! Watch Out! (EP) (April 24, 2012)
- Kids Wanna Know (EP) (October 9, 2012)
- Black To Gold (March 30, 2015)
- PHASES (March 9, 2018)
- Spirit (April 8, 2022)
- Lonesome High (September 13, 2024)

=== Singles ===
- "I Heard I Had" (October 15, 2013)
- "Best Look Lately" (April 22, 2014)
- "Black To Gold" (February 10, 2015)
- "Tongues" (June 23, 2015)
- "Boys & Blondes" (October 27, 2017)
- "Live Through The Night" (May 25, 2018)
- "Modern Shakedown" (January 18, 2019)
- "Fake Fame" (September 10, 2021)
- "Gimme Spirit" (April 8, 2022)
- "Meet Me At The Rio" (August 9, 2022)
- "Goon" (March 8, 2024)
- "Cutting Teeth" (September 13, 2024)
- "Garbage" (July 12, 2024)

=== Charting history ===
Year	Song	Chart Peak		Albums
Year	Song	CAN Alt	CAN Active	Albums
2013	"I Heard I Had"	3	13	Black to Gold
2014	"Best Look Lately"	12	25	Black to Gold
2015	"Black to Gold"	2	12	Black to Gold
2015	"Tongues"	11	20	Black to Gold
2017	"Boys & Blondes"	6	15	PHASES
2018	"Live Through The Night"	1	5	PHASES
2019	"Modern Shakedown"	6	22	PHASES
2021	"Fake Fame"	1	9	Spirit
2022	"Gimme Spirit"	9	15	Spirit
2022	"Meet Me At The Rio"	8	35	Spirit
2024	"Goon"	1	14	Lonesome High
2024	"Cutting Teeth"	5	-	Lonesome High
2024	"Garbage":	27	-	Lonesome High
