= Fake Shark discography =

- Studio albums: 7
- EPs: 6
- Singles: 34
- Music videos: 23

This is the discography of Canadian alternative, indie pop rock band, Fake Shark. Included in this discography are nine items that are from when the group was officially known as "Fake Shark – Real Zombie!".

These items are the group's first three studio albums, four EP's and two compilations respectively released between 2005 and 2014. Besides those items, this discography documents every studio album, EP and single released since 2015 under the name, "Fake Shark".

== Albums ==
=== Studio albums ===
Title	Album details
Zebra! Zebra!	Released: April 25, 2007; Label: Vinyl Junkie Recordings, Rough Trade; Formats: CD, digital download; Released under the name "Fake Shark – Real Zombie!"
Meeting People Is Terrible	Released: August 26, 2009; Label: Vinyl Junkie, PHD Canada; Formats: CD, digital; Released under the name "Fake Shark – Real Zombie!"
Liar	Released: February 14, 2013; Label: Light Organ Records, Universal Music Group; Formats: CD, digital; Released under the name "Fake Shark – Real Zombie!"
Faux Real	Released: May 26, 2017; Label: Light Organ, Sony Music; Formats: LP, CD, digital, streaming
Time for The Future	Released: November 5, 2021; Label: Light Organ, Warner Music Canada; Formats: LP, digital, streaming
Afterglow	Released: January 12, 2024; Label: Light Organ, Warner; Formats: LP, digital, streaming
Rhythm Prism	Released: January 16, 2026; Label: Light Organ, Warner; Formats: LP, CD, digital, streaming

=== Compilation albums ===
Title	Album details
Quadruple Dare: Vancouver Mutilation	Released: December 10, 2009; Label: Quadruple Dare; Formats: LP, digital; Note: Four-way split featuring defunct Vancouver bands covering each other's music. The group's contributions were released under the name "Fake Shark – Real Zombie!"
Don't Forget	Released: January 28, 2014; Label: Light Organ Records, Universal; Formats: 2x CD, digital, streaming; Note: Compilation of their first two albums; "Zebra! Zebra!" and "Meeting People Is Terrible" plus respective bonus and demo tracks. The band's final release under the name "Fake Shark – Real Zombie!"

== Extended plays ==
Title	Album details
Post Band-aid Nelly	Released: 2005; Label: Self-released; Released under the name "Fake Shark – Real Zombie!"
Cursing In Braille	Released: 2006; Label: Self-released; Note: Tour EP released under the name "Fake Shark – Real Zombie!"
Style of Substance	Released: 2008; Label: Self-released; Released under the name "Fake Shark – Real Zombie!"
Angel Lust	Released: January 9, 2009; Label: Vinyl Junkie, PHD Canada; Formats: digital; Note: Four-song sampler of "Meeting People Is Terrible" released under the name "Fake Shark – Real Zombie!"
Walking Through A Fantasy	Released: October 26, 2018; Label: Light Organ; Formats: digital, streaming
House of Mirrors	Released: July 10, 2020; Label: Light Organ; Formats: digital, streaming

== Singles ==
Song	Year	Chart Peak	Albums
Song	Year	CAN Alt	Albums
"Monday Tuesday WTF"	2005	-	Zebra Zebra!
"Designer Drugs"	2007	-	Zebra Zebra!
"Avrl Kadaver"	2008	-	Style of Substance
"Angel Lust"	2009	-	Meeting People Is Terrible
"Sour Times" (Portishead cover)	2010	-	Non-album singles
"Girls" (featuring Steve Bays)	2012	-	Liar
"Get Weird"	2013	-	Liar
"Paint It Gold"	2013	-	Liar
"Perfume"	2013	-	Liar
"Cheap Thrills"	2015	-	Faux Real
"Foreign Christmas"	2015	-	Non-album singles
"Something Special"	2016	-	Faux Real
"Heart 2 Heart"	2017	-	Faux Real
"NOFOMO"	2017	-	Faux Real
"Wake Up"	2018	-	Walking Through A Fantasy
"Feel Alive"	2018	-	Walking Through A Fantasy
"Smile"	2018	-	Walking Through A Fantasy
"Invincible"	2019	-	House of Mirrors
"Bad Chemistry"	2020	-	House of Mirrors
"Superstitious Thing"	2020	-	House of Mirrors
"Your Woman" (White Town cover)	2020	4	Non-album singles
"Time for The Future"	2021	-	Time for The Future
"Quicksand"	2021	-	Time for The Future
"Loser"	2021	3	Time for The Future
"Paranoid"	2022	7	Afterglow
"Save Me"	2023	1	Afterglow
"Bummer Summer"	2023	-	Afterglow
"Exactly What I Thought You Were"	2023	1	Afterglow
"Kinda Like It" (featuring The OBGMs)	2024	-	Afterglow
"Teenage Dirtbag" (Wheatus cover)	2024	-	Non-album singles
"Bang Bang Bang"	2025	-	Rhythm Prism
"I'm With Stupid" (featuring Pat Gillett)	2025	-	Rhythm Prism
"Monster"	2025	17	Rhythm Prism
"Tired of You" (featuring Fionn)	2025	-	Rhythm Prism

== Music videos ==
Year	Title	Director(s)
2007	"Monday Tuesday WTF"	Vinyl Junkie
2008	"Designer Drugs"	Bienvenido Cruz
2009	"Angel Lust"	CJ Wallis
2010	"Siamese Disease"	Corey MacGregor
2012	"Girls" (featuring Steve Bays)	Amani Vice, Jameson Matthew Parker
2013	"Get Weird"	Cole Walliser, Lindsey Blaufarb
2013	"Paint It Gold"	Ben Knechtel
2014	"Perfume"	Emma Higgins
2015	"Cheap Thrills"	Steve Bays, David Tomiak
2016	"Something Special"	Kevvy, Johnny Jansen
2017	"Heart 2 Heart"	Ben Knechtel
2018	"Wake Up" (featuring Fionn)	Johnny Jansen
2019	"Invincible"	The Soska Sisters
2020	"L-ectric Touch"	Hannah Dougherty
2021	"Your Woman"	Gretchen Lanham, Matthew Miller
2021	"Quicksand"	Steve Bays
2021	"Loser"	Sterling Larose, Jacob Andrew Harris
2021	"Feel That Way" (featuring Madison Olds)	Steve Bays
2022	"Paranoid"	Brandon William Thatcher
2023	"Save Me"	Matthew Miller
2023	"Bummer Summer"	Arezo "Rizz" Khanjani
2023	"Exactly What I Thought You Were"	Lindsey Blane
2025	"I'm With Stupid" (featuring Pat Gillett)	Luke Bentlay
