= Liar (Fake Shark – Real Zombie! album) =

Studio album by Fake Shark – Real Zombie!
- Released: February 14, 2013
- Recorded: March 2012
- Genre: alternative rock, electropop, alternative hip hop, art punk, funk metal, avant-funk, experimental
- Length: 54:30
- Label: Light Organ, Universal Music
- Producer: Kevvy, Steve Bays, Greig Nori, Jimmy Urine, Tino Zolpho

Singles from Liar
- 1. "Girls" Released: Sept 18 2012; 2. "Get Weird" Released: Jan 31 2013; 3. "Paint It Gold" Released: April 16, 2013; 4. "Perfume" Released: Nov 4 2013

Liar is the third studio album by Vancouver alternative band, Fake Shark – Real Zombie! released February 14, 2013 through Canadian record labels, Light Organ Records and Universal Music Canada. The album marks a change in sound from the band's previous albums for an eclectic mix of alternative rock, electro-pop, and alternative hip hop compared to post-hardcore and dance punk origins of their earlier work. The album is also the group's first release on Light Organ, after signing to the label in 2012.

Liar was preceded by two singles, "Girls", featuring Hot Hot Heat's lead singer, Steve Bays and "Get Weird" while remaining singles, "Paint It Gold" and "Perfume" would be released following the initial release. Guests and collaborators for the album included Bays, Dave Ogilvie, Henry Rollins, Care Failure of Die Mannequin, Greig Nori of Treble Charger, Jimmy Urine of Mindless Self Indulgence, Canadian singer/songwriter, Adaline, Japanese Voyeurs, and members of The Birthday Massacre.

== Track listing ==
No.	Title	Length
1.	"Boys"	2:24
2.	"Get Weird"	3:11
3.	"Girls" (featuring Steve Bays)	3:01
4.	"Wish Upon a Star"	4:32
5.	"Paint It Gold"	3:02
6.	"Service Announcement" (featuring Henry Rollins)	0:37
7.	"Afterskool Special" (featuring Jimmy Urine)	3:58
8.	"Gimme Those Teeth" (featuring Care Failure)	2:58
9.	"Fuck Kevvy"	3:49
10.	"Yes Yes No No" (featuring Adaline)	3:30
11.	"Soon to Be Strangers"	2:51
12.	"As Far as I Got"	0:41
13.	"Whatever"	2:26
14.	"JackNJill"	2:47
15.	"Blonde Friends" (featuring Henry Rollins)	1:41
16.	"Perfume"	2:59
17.	"Transylvania Bitch"	3:05
Total length:		54:30

== Personnel ==
- Kevvy Mental - lead vocals, production (tracks 1, 2, 6, 7, 8, 9, 10, 12, 13, 14, 15, 17), engineering (tracks 1, 2, 6, 7, 8, 9, 10, 12, 13, 14, 15, 17), mixing (tracks 6, 9, 12, 15), writing, programming, synths, guitar, bass, drums
- Louis Wu - guitar (tracks 3, 4, 5, 10, 11, 14)
- Mike Schlosser - guitar (tracks 11, 16, 17)
- Anthony Bleed - bass (track 8)
- Jason Pierce - drums (tracks 8, 10, 11, 16)
- Steve Bays - production (tracks 3, 4, 5), engineering (tracks 3, 4, 5), mixing (tracks 2, 3, 4, 5), vocals (track 3), prank call (skit)
- Care Failure - vocals (track 8)
- Adaline - vocals (track 10)
- Cat Thompson - vocals (track 17)
- Jimmy Urine - vocals, production, engineering (track 7)
- Kristy Audette - trumpet (track 3)
- Matt Webb - prank call (skit)
- Brett Jamieson - prank call (skit)
- Henry Rollins - spoken word (tracks 6, 15)
- Colin Janz - programming (tracks 16, 17)
- Greig Nori - production (tracks 8, 11, 16), writing (tracks 1, 11, 16)
- David Henriques - engineering (tracks 8, 11, 16)
- Tino Zolpho - production, engineering (track 7), bass (tracks 10, 14)
- Dave Ogilvie - mixing
- Pedro Dzelme - mixing assistant
- Greg Grimaldi - mastering
