= Gay Nineties (band) =

Canadian indie rock band

- Origin: Vancouver, British Columbia, Canada
- Genres: Alternative rock, indie rock
- Years active: 2011–present
- Label: Love Letter Recordings/Fontana North
- Members: Parker Bossley; Bruce Ledingham IV; Daniel Knowlton; Malcolm Holt
- Website: www.gayninetiesmusic.ca

Gay Nineties are a Canadian indie rock band, with stylistic roots in music from the 1970s to the 1990s.

== History ==
Taking their name from the decadent last decade of the 19th century, the band originally comprised Parker Bossley (vocals, guitar) and Malcolm Holt (drums), who had previously played together in Fake Shark - Real Zombie!. The band became a four-piece with the addition of Bruce Ledingham IV (keyboards) and Daniel Knowlton (bass guitar, vocals).

The band released an EP, Coming Together in 2011. Their 2014 song "Letterman" charted at no. 8 on the Alternative Rock (Mediabase) chart.

In 2014 the band was nominated for a CASBY Award for Favourite New Artist. A second single, "Hold Your Fire", received regular radio airplay in 2015.

Their EP Liberal Guilt was released in January, 2015 on Love Letter Recordings/Fontana North. It is a collection of songs inspired by 70s AM pop, glam rock, and indie rock.

In February 2017 the band released the album Decadent Days.

Members of the band have also played in Hot Hot Heat, Youngblood, Fur Trade, and Mounties.

== Discography ==
- Coming Together EP (2011)
- Liberal Guilt EP (2015)
- "Hold Your Fire"/"Letterman" (2015)
- Decadent Days (2017)
