= Womb of Dreams =

Studio album by Fan Death
- Released: August 6, 2010
- Recorded: 2009
- Genres: Electro, Italo disco
- Length: 39:48
- Label: Last Gang Records
- Producer: Szam Findlay

Fan Death chronology
A Coin for the Well (2010)	Womb of Dreams (2010)

Womb of Dreams is the debut album by electro-disco band Fan Death. It was released on August 6, 2010.

== Critical reception ==
Luke Winkie of musicOMH wrote that "The album becomes more traditionalist and (un-coincidentally) more fun-loving around its middle...When Fan Death are clicking, they're a force to be reckoned with, the band's chemistry practically oozing from the songs."

Garry Mulholland from the BBC wrote that Fan Death had "made a debut album that successfully adds up to more than the sum of its hip influences" and "will induce waves of pure pleasure in those of us who will never tire of a melancholy melody, a dodgy synthetic string motif and a disco beat."

== Track listing ==
1. "Constellations"
2. "Veronica's Veil"
3. "Choose Tonight"
4. "Phantom Sensation"
5. "The Best Night"
6. "When The Money's Right"
7. "Reunited"
8. "The Son Will Rise"
9. "Crowd Control"
10. "Side By Side"
11. "Almost There"

== Personnel ==
- Producer- Szam Findlay
- Vocals- Dandilion Wind Opaine, Marta Jacuibek-McKeever
- Music- Szam Findlay, Dandilion Wind Opaine,
- Lyrics- Dandilion Wind Opaine

Additional musicians

- Ariel Barnes- Cello
- Max Murphy- Baritone saxophone
- Dameian Walsh- Alto saxophone
- Nimish Parekh- Trombone
- Kent Wallace- Trumpet
- Markus Takizawa- Viola
- Mark Ferris- 1st Violin
- Cameron Wilson- 2nd Violin
- Parker Bossley- Bass

Production

- Mike Marsh- Audio mastering
- Austin Garrick and Mike Rocha- Mixing
- Leo Chadburn- String & Horn Arrangement/Conductor
- Matt Anderson- Additional Drum Programming (tracks 2–5)
- Kevin James Maher- Vocal and Bass Engineer
- Scott Ternan- String & Horn Engineer
