= Sun Wizard =

- Origin: Vancouver, British Columbia, Canada
- Genres: Rock
- Years active: 2008–2012 (hiatus)
- Labels: Light Organ Records
- Members: Malcolm Jack; James Younger; Francesco Lyon; Ben Frey
- Website: sunwizard.bandcamp.com

Sun Wizard is a band formed in Vancouver in 2008 by James Younger, Malcolm Jack, and Francesco Lyon. Ben Frey later joined the band.

They self-released their first EP, 'When They Were Right', in the summer of 2009. This attracted local indie label Light Organ Records, and they released their first seven-inch, 'Quit Acting Cold', in the summer of 2010. Positively 4th Avenue followed this, their first full-length album. Positively 4th Avenue was recorded by Colin Stewart and Dave Ogilvie and featured two singles, 'World's Got A Handle' and 'Middle Of My Heart'.

After Sun Wizard, James Younger released a solo album named Feelin' American, Malcolm Jack formed Capitol 6, releasing Pretty Lost with them and released his first solo album, I'm My Own Bewitchment. Jack also formed Dada Plan, releasing A Dada Plan is Free in 2014. Ben Frey joined The Shilohs, releasing So Wild with the band.
