= Vancouver International Film Festival =

Annual film festival held in Vancouver, British Columbia, Canada

- Location: 1181 Seymour Street; Vancouver, British Columbia; V6B 3M7
- Founded: 1958
- Founded by: Leonard Schein
- Most recent: 2025
- Hosted by: Greater Vancouver International Film Festival Society
- Festival date: October 1 - October 11, 2026
- Language: International
- Website: www.viff.org

The Vancouver International Film Festival (VIFF) is an annual film festival held in Vancouver, British Columbia, Canada, for two weeks in late September and early October.

The festival is operated by the Greater Vancouver International Film Festival Society, a provincially-registered non-profit and federally-registered charitable organization, which also runs the year-round programming of the VIFF Cinema (formerly known as the Vancity Theatre) and Lochmaddy Studio Theatre at the VIFF Centre.

Both in terms of admissions and number of films screened (133,000 and 324 respectively in 2016), VIFF is among the five largest film festivals in North America. The festival screens films annually from approximately 73 countries on 10 screens.

The festival originally had three main programming platforms: East Asian film, Canadian film, and nonfiction films. Currently, the program includes feature films, shorts, and documentaries from around the world, along with talks, workshops, and other live events related to cinema.

The organization offers artist development initiatives, including programs associated with the Institute for the Moving Image, which focus on professional development for filmmakers and creators.

== History ==
The festival was first launched in 1958; however, facing financial and organizational difficulties in the late 1960s, it was discontinued after the 1969 festival. The Greater Vancouver International Film Festival Society was incorporated in the early 1980s and relaunched the festival in its current form in 1982, under the leadership of Leonard Schein.

In 2019, Member of Parliament Hedy Fry, chairwoman of the Standing Committee on Canadian Heritage, announced that the Government of Canada would provide over $1.4 million in funding for that year's festival, as well as for cultural infrastructure upgrades to its main theatre.

== Venues ==
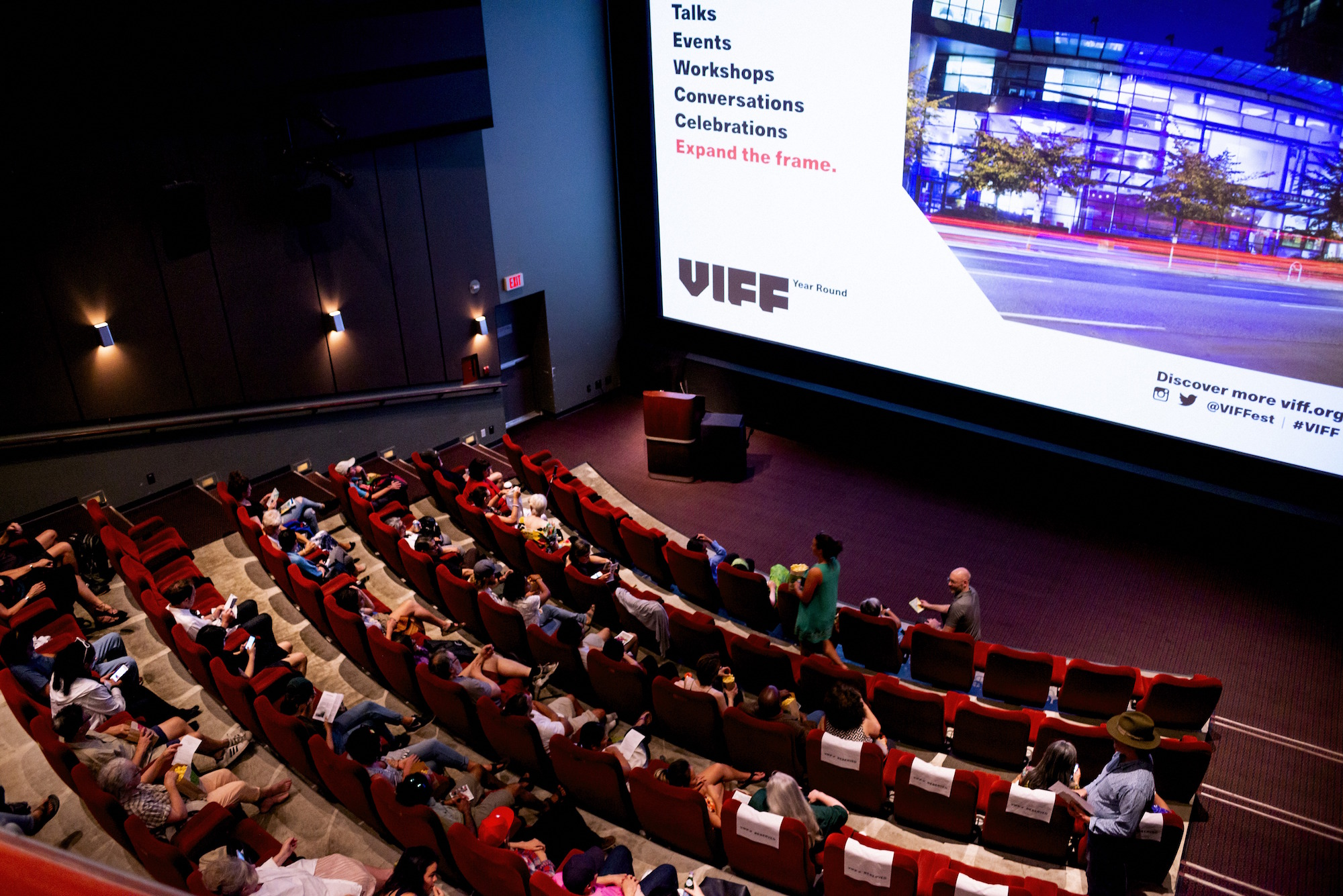
Opened in 2005, the VIFF Centre is the home the Vancouver International Film Festival offices, as well as the Vancity Theatre and Studio Theatre.

The relaunched festival was staged entirely at the city's independent Ridge Theatre, although the festival has since expanded into a multi-venue event headquartered at the VIFF Centre in downtown Vancouver. During the mid-1980s and 1990s, screenings spread across neighbourhood theatres such as the Hollywood and the Dunbar as well as Theatre Row cinemas including the Caprice, the Paradise, and the Capitol 6. From 2002 until November 2012, the seven-screen Granville 7 Cinemas multiplex served as the festival's main downtown venue, after which multi-screen festival screenings shifted to the International Village complex alongside the Pacific Cinematheque.

The VIFF Centre hosts VIFF's year-round programming, workshops, special events and collaborates with local organizations for special events.

== Awards ==
VIFF presents juried and audience awards for films screened at the festival, including categories for Canadian and international cinema, documentaries and emerging filmmakers.

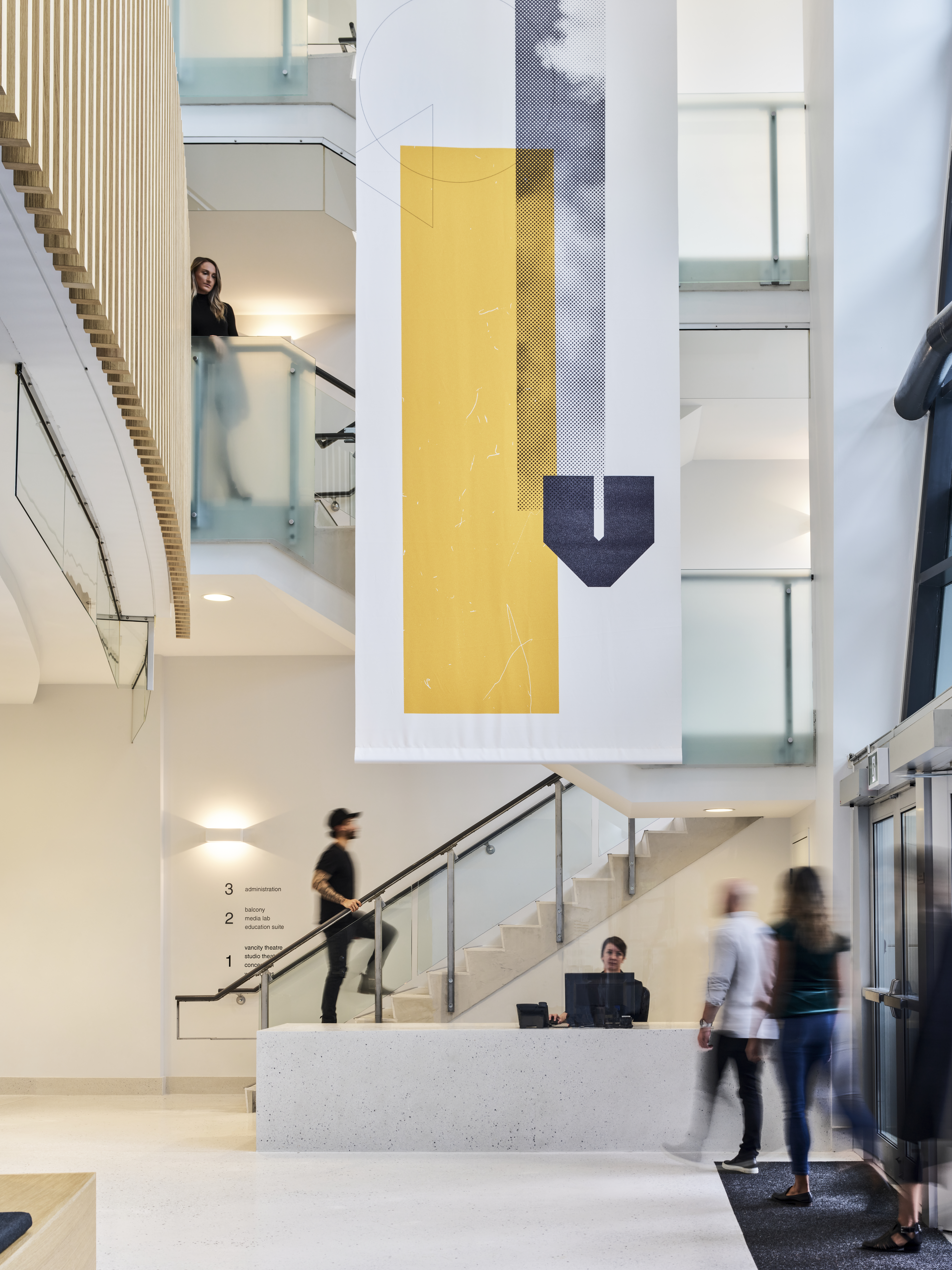
The VIFF Centre is the home of the Vancouver International Film Festival offices, Vancity Theatre and Studio Theatre.

== See also ==
- MENA film festival
