= Hotel Mira =

Canadian rock band

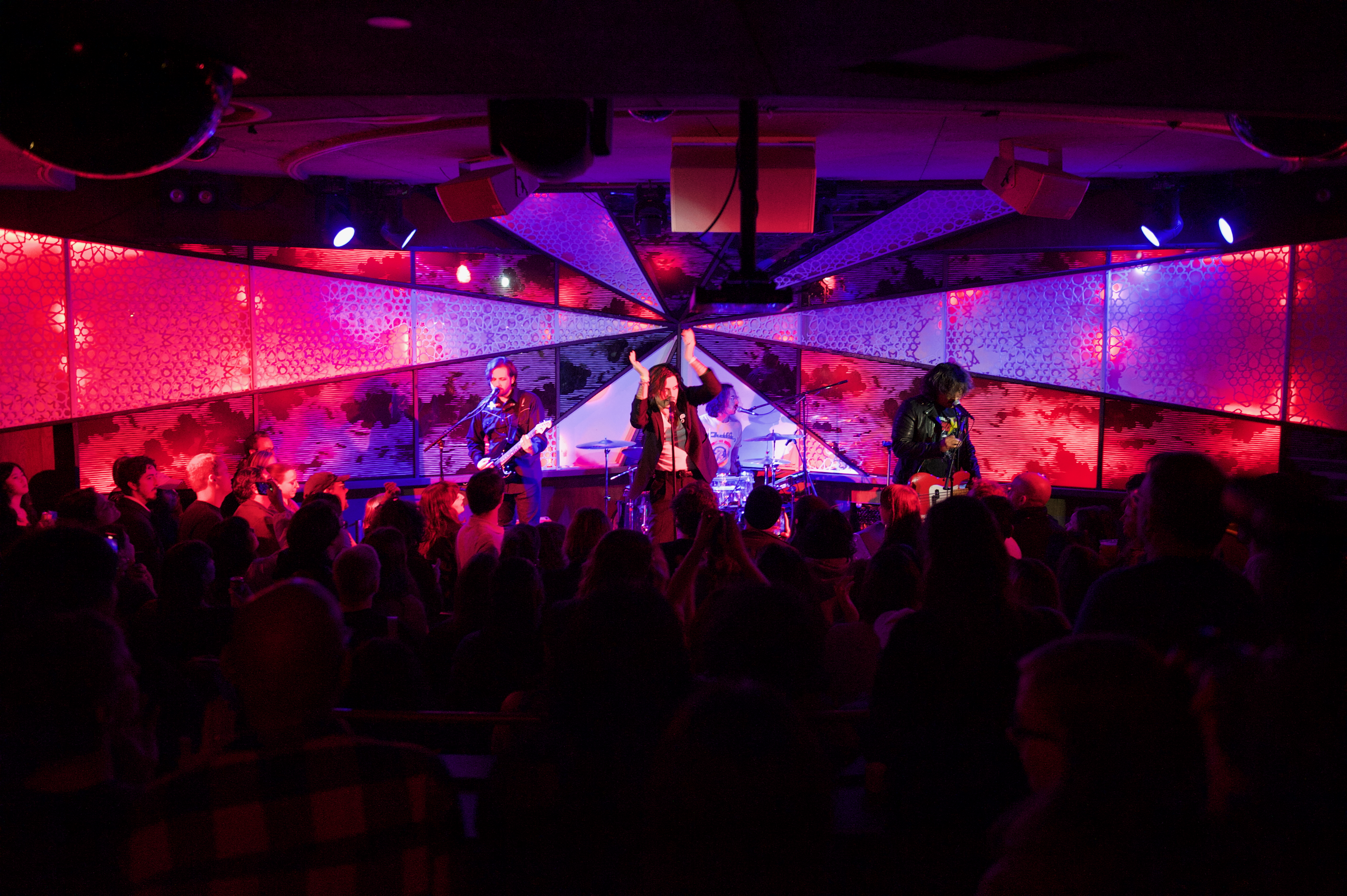
- Hotel Mira performing in 2025

Background information
- Also known as: The Beauties; Japanese Girls; JPNSGRLS
- Origin: Vancouver, British Columbia, Canada
- Genres: Indie rock; alternative rock; post-punk revival
- Years active: 2010–present
- Label: Light Organ
- Members: Charlie Kerr; Mike Noble; Clark Grieve; Cole George
- Past members: Simon Eltermon; Sam Rutledge; Oliver Mann; Christopher McClelland; Graham Serl; Colton Lauro
- Website: hotelmiramusic.com

Hotel Mira (formerly known as JPNSGRLS, a disemvowelment of Japanese Girls) is a Canadian alternative rock band formed in Vancouver in 2010. It consists of Charlie Kerr on vocals, Mike Noble on bass, Clark Grieve on guitar and keyboards, and Cole George on drums.

== History ==
The band members are all originally from the Greater Vancouver area. Kerr and co-founding lead guitarist Oliver Mann formed a core project in 2007 while still in high school, with Christopher McClelland joining in 2009 and Graham Serl rounding out the lineup for JPNSGRLS in 2010. Live shows were integral to the band from its beginning, performing in battles-of-the-bands and packing out any venue that would allow teenage performers and their audiences.

Prior to 2010, JPNSGRLS was known as the Beauties, but due to a name conflict with an existing band, the group changed its name to Japanese Girls. This was chosen as a tribute to another band they admired—an all-female Japanese indie group called Mass of the Fermenting Dregs. However, upon realizing the name caused difficulty when searching for the band online, they switched to using the disemvoweling JPNSGRLS.

JPNSGRLS was nominated for the SiriusXM Canada Independent Music Award for Emerging Artist of the Year (English) in April 2015.

In January 2016, after the recording of their second full-length album, Divorce, was completed, Mann announced via Facebook that he was leaving the band for other pursuits. "As some of you already know, 2016 will be a big change for me, in the fact that I have recently decided to leave JPNSGRLS. It was a tough decision to make, but something I had been thinking about for a long time", he said. "Being a part of JPNSGRLS was amazing, and I am sad to leave it. I got to see so much of the world and am very proud of what we had accomplished over the last 8 years". After the band mounted a search and auditioned several musicians, Colton Lauro, also from the Greater Vancouver area and having worked with several area acts as well as being a session musician, became the band's new lead guitarist in the spring of 2016.

In April 2018, Kerr announced via several social media platforms and the band website that the group was retiring the name JPNSGRLS and rebranding as Hotel Mira. He also announced a new iteration of the band lineup, as Serl and McClelland had left in January 2017. Lauro would stay on as lead guitarist and Mike Noble was added as a new bass player. Along with these changes, the announcement also included a new single, "3AM Lullaby"—the first as Hotel Mira.

After releasing a self-titled EP in August 2018, Hotel Mira released their first full-length album, Perfectionism, on Valentine's Day 2020. With this release, the band was now rounded out by the addition of Clark Grieve on keyboards and Cole George on drums—both previously session musicians with several bands in the Vancouver area. Lauro left Hotel Mira in 2021.

== Releases ==
=== The Sharkweek EP (2013) as JPNSGRLS ===
JPNSGRLS made their debut with The Sharkweek EP in June 2013, distributed by Light Organ Records. The record was produced and engineered by Justin Brown and co-produced by the band and Mike Paton.

Reviewers noted the band's unique combination of syncopation, cohesion, modernity, and experimentation with lyrical content, musicianship, and influences. The first single and video released from The Sharkweek EP was "Vancouver Grizzly", and the video for the follow-up single, "Monarch Butterfly", debuted on Diffuser.fm in January 2014. JPNSGRLS also played at the BIME Festival in Bilbao, Spain, in November 2013, in support of the record.

The single "Red and Green" was included on Light Organ's Christmas album Sleighed, also in November 2013, with the video released at Christmas 2014.

=== Circulation (2014) as JPNSGRLS ===
For their full-length debut, having now been fully signed by Light Organ Records, the band went into Vancouver's Greenhouse Studios with producer Steve Bays (Hot Hot Heat, Mounties), and engineer Greg Calbi (Yeah Yeah Yeahs, MGMT, Tame Impala, St. Vincent). Circulation was recorded in seven days without a click track. The album was released in North America on July 15, 2014.

Singles issued from the album in North America were "Mushrooms", "Smalls", "Tiger", "Circulation", and "Southern Comforting", with official full videos released for "Mushrooms", "Smalls", and "Circulation".

Overall, reviews of Circulation were positive and called particular attention to the record's energy and how it would translate live, and vice versa—noting the uplift of the rhythm section and the contrasting darker lyrical content. Reviewers also noted that JPNSGRLS' combination of 1990s alt-rock and post-punk revival created a complex modern rock sound that made it a 2014 musical peak. AbsolutePunk's review indicated it was 'easily one of the best rock albums of 2014'.

In dissenting reviews, Alan Ranta of The Georgia Straight stated that Circulation was "a little inconsistent and under-developed" as a whole but concluded that "hooks abound... so the future holds promise", while Ride the Tempo also made mention of "uneven" results—expressing frustration by saying that JPNSGRLS clearly had the capacity to be "exceptional", while also admitting that the songs were "solid and enjoyable".

The single "Smalls" went straight to #1 on CBC Radio 3 Top 30 Canadian Indie Songs and held that place for four weeks in April/May 2014. It went to #5 on the CBC Radio 3 Playlist overall the week of May 30, 2014. It reached #24 on Mediabase's Alt Chart (Canadian commercial radio), and stayed at between #26 and #28 for a further eight weeks. The video for "Smalls", directed by Nathan Boey and partly inspired by the film Scott Pilgrim vs. the World and the stop-motion films of Tim Burton, was put into heavy rotation on Canada's MuchMusic in July 2014.

The follow-up single "Tiger" hit #1 on the CBC Radio 3 Top 30 Playlist Chart for the week of August 6, 2014, spending eight weeks on the chart in total and rising again to #2 the week of September 2, 2014. On the CBC Radio 3 Top 30 Indie Canadian Songs Chart, it went straight to #7 and remained on the chart for eight weeks.

"Southern Comforting" would go on to become a Spotify sleeper hit, racking up over two million plays by the end of 2018.

Circulation debuted on the CMJ 200 (American college and community radio) at #96 in July 2014, spending ten weeks on the chart, with a top position of #35 in August 2014. On Exclaim! magazine's Earshot National Top 50 (Canadian college and community radio), the album debuted at #34 in July 2014, topping out at #27 in August 2014.

In the UK, BBC Radio 6 Music debuted "Smalls" in March 2015, with New Music presenter Lauren Laverne referring to the single as "feisty" and remarking on the "huge guitars". The British press compared JPNSGRLS to their own independent music scene, with NME Radar name-checking Arctic Monkeys for comparative musicianship but making clear vocalist distinctions. Q magazine debuted "Mushrooms" as one of "5 Songs to Hear This Week" for the week of March 9, 2015, instead referencing the Strokes for comparison.

Circulation was released in the UK and Europe in April 2015. The video-only single "Brandon", directed by Rayln Gladue, was initially released exclusively on the German website Noisey, in May 2015. Both the song and its video were inspired by Boys Don't Cry, a 1999 film starring Hilary Swank, which told the story of Brandon Teena, a trans man who was raped and murdered in Nebraska in 1993. The British Columbia Teachers' Federation listed the "Brandon" video as a recommended resource for teachers, relating to LGBTQ social justice issues.

=== Divorce (2016) as JPNSGRLS ===
JPNSGRLS' sophomore album, Divorce, was released on July 22, 2016. Steve Bays, again, produced some tracks, along with Tom Dobrzanski (the Zolas, Said the Whale) and David Schiffman. Mastering was once more done by Greg Calbi. Recording took place in Vancouver's Monarch Studios and in Los Angeles.

Preview reviews for the album were positive and strong, with one reviewer pointing out the maturity and progression of the album from the time of Circulation. "Kerr moves away from predictable 'indie-rock' clichés, with Divorce being essentially a collection of unorthodox love songs; about letting go rather than holding on, about love as a two-way street, about what could have been, and about how we approach love in the modern world", wrote music website Circuit Sweet, adding, "The driving dominance of the Serl-McClelland rhythm section pumping out masterful and edgy layers, combined with the well-placed cross-section of electric guitar tones is a strand running throughout." It went on, "(The album) is of a more mature, melodic alternative-rock sound without losing any of JPNSGRLS infectious energy."

British music website FMS (FashionMusicStyle) went further in its take on Kerr's abilities as a lyricist, stating, "The tales of isolated youth, love and lust that filled their first album, Circulation, make a welcome return, set apart from the pack by the quality of songwriting from lead singer Charlie Kerr... His songwriting captures elements of the witty social insight of Alex Turner, the sing-a-long choruses of the Gallaghers and the honest emotion of Jesse Lacey and weaves it all together, as Kerr swings from vitriolic roar to crisp falsetto, singing with such passion that the listener cannot help but be pulled into his world... Whilst JPNSGRLS continue to experiment with their sound and influences, Divorce is a testament to the band's craftsmanship and talent as they create one of the best indie rock albums of the year so far."

Post-release reviews of Divorce were also largely positive. "Stupid fun meets adult themes and wins in the end", said Muso's Guide, who also gave the album "a thumbs up", called the track "A Comprehensive List of Things I Love" "charmingly summer tinged" and stated that the "band's strength in depth is amply plumbed on subsequent track 'Circus' as they slow things down just the right side of cornball". Substream Magazine wrote that "Divorce offers a wholly refreshing take on indie rock that traverses several areas of the genre and its adjacent variations... It's catchy, structurally innovative, and sonically invigorating, with riffs riding riffs to victory, sure to accept its trophies atop 'best of 2016' podiums aplenty." "The band have drawn clear influence from the likes of the Hives and Arctic Monkeys but added their own unique touch", said Clunk Magazine—giving it 7.5 stars out of 10 and going on to say that Divorce "is cohesive, infectious and has multiple layers of intelligence through the songwriting".

Glide Magazine gave the album 8 out of 10 stars, also calling out the single "Oh My God" for particular attention, stating that "the song showcases what JPNSGRLS does best, combining post-punk's energy and riffing with the raw power and emotion of grunge". The site went on to say that "relentless in its intensity and deceptive in its intelligence, Divorce serves as an apt follow up to JPNSGRLS' critically acclaimed debut." In their review, the Louder Than War print version also gave Divorce 8 out of 10 stars and stated that "the thundering indie rock of 'A Girl from a Different Dimension', cool guitar effects of 'Trojan Horse' and infectious riff of 'Bully for You' mark them out as witty, fun, and intense indie rock in the same league as the Strokes and the Libertines. Full of verve and energy, these are unorthodox love songs about letting go."

In mildly dissenting reviews, NME had the initial view that the album was "packing angst-ridden, power-chord-heavy rock played at breakneck speed" and that "Divorce is sprinkled with enough inventiveness to make it a success" with "gems to mine here", but ended by stating that "Divorce is by no means a bad record, but nor is it a particularly memorable or noteworthy one." Stuart Derdyn of the Vancouver Sun said in his review of the album that "Charlie Kerr has the requisite swagger in his voice and enough range to go from a seductive and detached lower register to high-pitched howling on 'A Girl from a Different Dimension'... While the group is mostly thrashing full-on, it displays a great sense of pop hooks on the super-catchy 'A Comprehensive List of Things I Love'—complete with call-and-response girl-group-style choruses. It doesn't all work. 'Holding Back' and 'All of Myself' are plodding filler and the slower numbers generally leave little or no impression."

JPNSGRLS debuted Divorce's first single, "Bully for You", exclusively via the PopMatters website in April 2016, with wide release set for April 15. PopMatters called "Bully for You" "an empathetic expression of male sympathy over the everyday misogyny that women must face." Kerr's statement on the song was that it is "an observational protest song about the ceaseless, unfair treatment of women from the point of view of a cisgendered man."

In an interview with Jon Williams of the Zone 91.3, a radio station out of Victoria, BC, Kerr expanded on this first by referencing the historical trope of rock music misogyny and not wanting to be on the wrong side of that but also saying that he was "frustrated by stories from female friends, of oppression and unfair treatment", and that "maybe it's not our place as men to comment on it, but I haven't seen men say much."

German alternative music site Visions noted the socio-critical theme of the single and shifts from the band's previous work, along with the group's continuing ability to segue seamlessly between indie, pop, and blues rock. Other music sites also commented on the explosive nature, both musically and lyrically, of "Bully for You", with one stating it was 'raucous rock at its best... filled with intense riffs, impassioned lyrics and exciting instrumentation.' The video for "Bully for You" was released simultaneously via the British music website Clash and the American music website Impose. Directed by Kevan Funk, it initially appears to be a violent fight in a boxing ring between two men that then subtly changes to an intimate dance. "We have created this piece from a place of hope empathy and compassion. The song "Bully for You" is essentially a protest song about the lack of gender equality in the world. And a big component of what society teaches boys, growing up, is to reject everything about themselves that is traditionally feminine, which ultimately leads to men seeing women as less than human," Kerr said.

Before wide release, Yangaroo had "Bully for You" as the number one "most active indie" for the week of April 11, 2016—meaning the "most streamed and downloaded singles during the given period on releases not directly promoted to radio by any of the 'major' record companies". "Bully for You" debuted on the Billboard charts at Number 49 on the Canada Rock National Airplay Chart for the week of May 28, 2016, remaining on the chart for thirteen weeks running, with highest chart position at number 42.

On May 10, 2016, JPNSGRLS live-streamed a one-off video event via the Light Organ Records website. This served as a live-shot video for the second single, "Oh My God", and also to announce the release date for the Divorce album. The video showed Kerr, initially in a balaclava, being chased by a police officer through a purpose-built set in the Light Organ headquarters—half-destroying the set in the process—and ending up caught with the band while performing in the studio. The video was later released in regular format via the New Noise Magazine website. The single "Oh My God" went on to hit Spotify Canada's Viral 50 at number ten for the week of June 2, 2016—based on the number of people who shared the track divided by the number who listened to it—across Facebook, Tumblr, Twitter, and Spotify itself. In October 2016, JPNSGRLS debuted the video for the single "Trojan Horse" via the CLRVYNT website. In it, the band is playing in a Stranger Things-style basement to a couple of aliens. Directed by Thomas Affolter, the video captures the filmic obsessions of the group along with the theatre of the absurd suggested by some of the lyrics.

On the week of August 9, 2016, Divorce debuted at #36 on Exclaim! magazine's !Earshot National Top 50 (Canadian college and community radio) charts—jumping 22 slots the following week to #14 and a further 8 slots the week after that, to #6.

The album stayed on that chart for a total of fourteen weeks, re-entering the Top 20 several times and also hitting the monthly !Earshot Top 200 Charts at #16 for August 2016, #14 for September 2016, and #33 for October 2016. Divorce also charted on the North American College and Community (NACC) Chart, debuting at #21 the week of August 16, 2016, hitting its highest spot the following week at #10 and staying on that chart for a total of ten weeks.

=== Hotel Mira EP (2018) ===
Reflecting the band's rebranding, the eponymous EP, released in August 2018, was the first under the new three-piece lineup of Kerr, Lauro, and Noble, with session musicians on percussion and keys, both in the studio and for touring. Speaking to BeatRoute magazine, Kerr characterised the new sound as being more "streamlined" and that the continued involvement of Dave Schiffman as producer meant that "he pushed me really hard to find better melodies, and do things that were more melodic, and find hooks in everything".

The first single, "3AM Lullaby", was characterized by Mike Usinger of The Georgia Straight as "a bass-and-drum bombed blast of impassioned indie new wave that contains one of the greatest summations of current life in Vancouver you'll hear this year". Alan Cross of A Journal of Musical Things noted that the song was exemplary of "trebly alt rock borrowing heavy influences from mid-00s garage indie, the lyrical content explores a far darker existentialism than the instrumentals necessarily reflect". On their exclusive release of the video, directed and produced by cmyk, Substream Magazine said the single "created an elevated sound that can be described as a polished garage rock band".

In exclusively releasing the second single, "Baby", Clash magazine said the song "offers spiky indie rock thrills, reminiscent of the Walkmen or Arctic Monkeys, but still with an attachment to the underground". The video for "Baby" was released via the band's Facebook page in June 2018. The third single, "Ginger Ale", was issued in July 2018 to multiple music blogs, with a live video shot at the Biltmore Hotel released in August, and the final single, "Stockholm", was published as video-only in September 2018, also shot at the Biltmore and also on the band's Facebook page.

Hotel Mira charted largely as a full work. It reached as high as #3 in some local market radio via !earshot charts but also hit the North American College and Community Chart, debuting at #92 the week of August 28, 2018, hitting its highest spot the following week at #56 and staying on that chart for a total of nine weeks.

=== Perfectionism (2020) ===
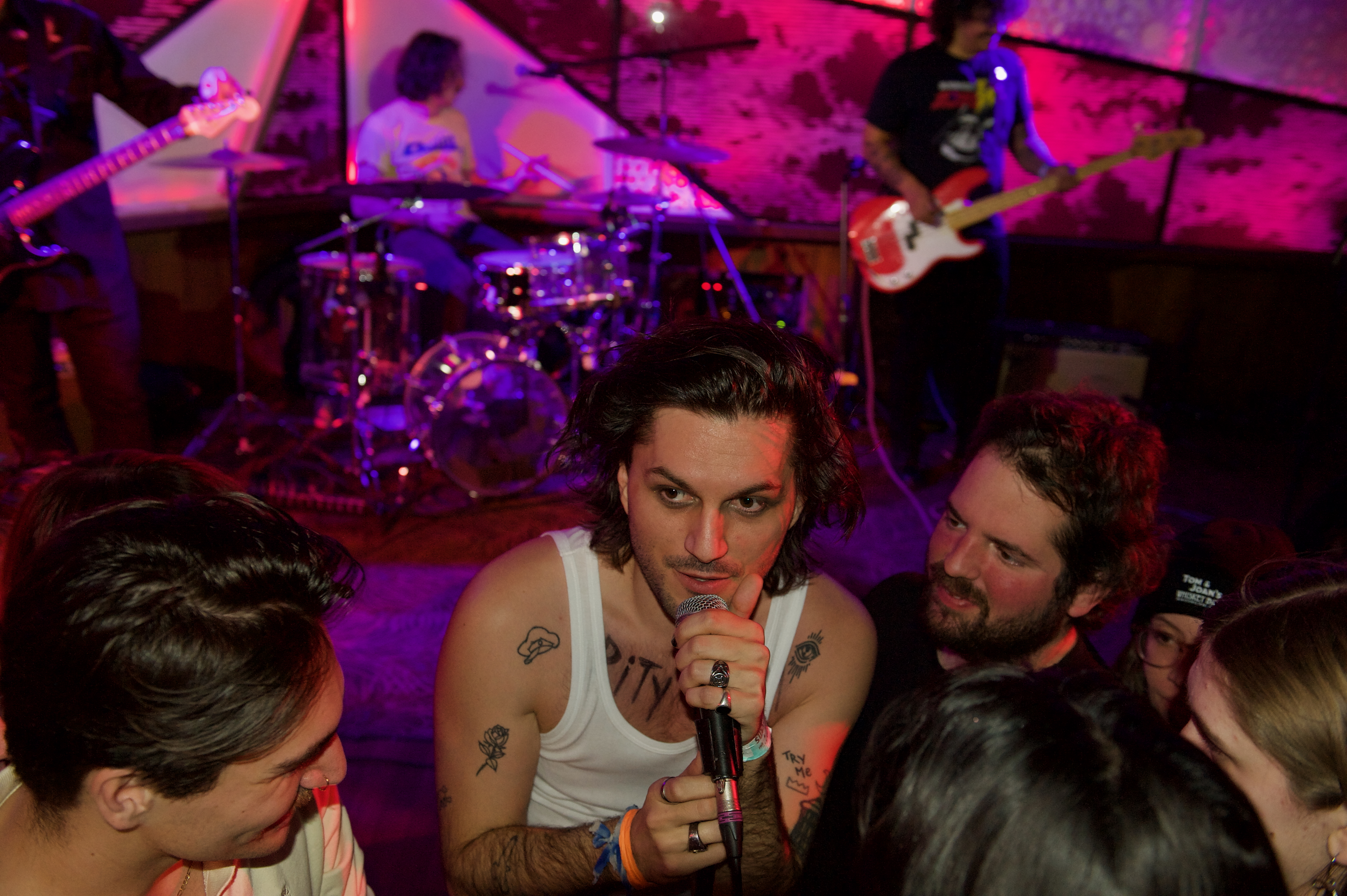
Charlie Kerr (centre)

Perfectionism, released on Valentine's Day 2020 and produced by Juno and Grammy Award-winning producer Eric Ratz, spawned several singles, starting in October 2018. This included "Jungle", "The Eyes on You", "This Could Be It for Me", "Speaking Off the Record", and "Better on Your Own"—the latter released simultaneously with the album itself. Speaking with Gauntlet, Kerr characterised the choice of release date as deliberate but not for the obvious reason: "I've always hated Valentine's Day and what it stood for. It was cool to do something that I thought could be utilized for people who felt lonely that day, that they get a record to listen to instead of a diamond ring or some shit".

"This Could Be It for Me" stayed on both Mediabase's Alternative and Rock charts and Billboard Canada Rock and Modern Rock airplay charts for thirteen weeks—with the initial highest chart position on Billboard at #22 and on Mediabase at #17, as of February 23, 2020. The mental health struggle themes in the song then seemed to catch the zeitgeist during the COVID-19 pandemic—hitting the top spot of #5 on the Billboard Modern Rock chart and #4 on the Mediabase chart the week of April 6, 2020—but then continuing on the charts overall for over a year from release. At one point, starting the week of July 13, 2020, both "This Could Be It for Me" and "Better on Your Own" were on the Billboard Modern Rock charts at the same time—at #20 and #40, respectively. When 2020 end-of-year Billboard BDS Chart reports came in, "This Could Be It for Me" was the #6 most-played CanCon Modern Rock Song and the #15 most-played Overall Rock Song. "Better on Your Own" was among the Top 30 Most Played Modern Rock Songs and the Top 70 Most Played Overall Modern Rock Songs.

The video for "This Could Be It for Me"—premiered on the Popdust website and directed by Zachary Vague and Sterling Larose—featured visuals that ran the gamut from a Marie Antoinette homage to an underwater sequence with Kerr in chains around his neck, to a hard neon performance section under a bridge. Popdust's Matthew Apadula opined that "but for all its surface glitz and familiar flavor, 'This Could Be It for Me' is still more interested in grappling with the internal darkness inside each of us more than it's interested in darkness as a video aesthetic". WXVU publication Barricade said the single "flaunts Hotel Mira's immaculate pop sensibility along with producer Eric Ratz's prowess behind the board". Kerr himself went on to say in a January 2021 interview with Adam Lisicky of Bringin' it Backwards, in association with American Songwriter, that "our biggest radio single is like explicitly about... having suicidal thoughts, and having them come up at like very inopportune times – and then, you know, the big kind of silver lining is like, it will go away, but also, it might come back... it's probably going to come back, so there's that line of 'if it's not tonight/then it's still on my mind/how nice'". By February 2021, YouTube views of the video sat at over 75,000. A third video, for "Speaking Off the Record", was also released, also directed by Vague and Larose. The final video from Perfection, for "The Eyes on You", directed by Lindsey Blane, was released exclusively via the Hollywood Life website in August 2021. The song, about the deterioration of a relationship, resulted in a video in which Kerr and his bandmates bury the ubiquitous pink jacket used during their Perfection era.

Early reviews of the album were consistently positive, both in mainstream publications and underground music blogs. Exclaim! gave it a four-star rating, saying that "Perfectionism is the catchiest and most consistent body of work from Hotel Mira to date" and that the album showed a clear evolution of the band's sound, concluding that the "charm and earnestness of Kerr's lyrics are what elevate it beyond just sounding good sonically to being a career-defining step in Hotel Mira's artistic journey". Barricade went on to say that "Perfectionism is a wonderfully executed, curated, and produced collection of guitar driven pop songs, almost to the point of, dare I say it, perfection". Soundzine stated that "Perfectionism brings with it a transition in sound from the garage into a considerably lusher landscape" and that the album "takes listeners on a vibrant and unpredictable ride". Several tracks "have big booming sound complimented [sic] by guitarist Colton Lauro's catchy guitar hooks and bass player Mike Noble's tight rhythmic bass lines", noted Canadian Beats Media.Kevin Mathews wrote in his Power of Pop blog that "there is not a single compromise to contemporary pop tastes as the music on Perfectionism runs the gamut of pop-rock viz. new wave, indie-alternative, post-punk, glam, punk – it's all evident in their blazing glory" and that "to simply highlight individual tracks does a disservice to the consistency of quality throughout the entirety of this excellent album".

== Influences and views ==
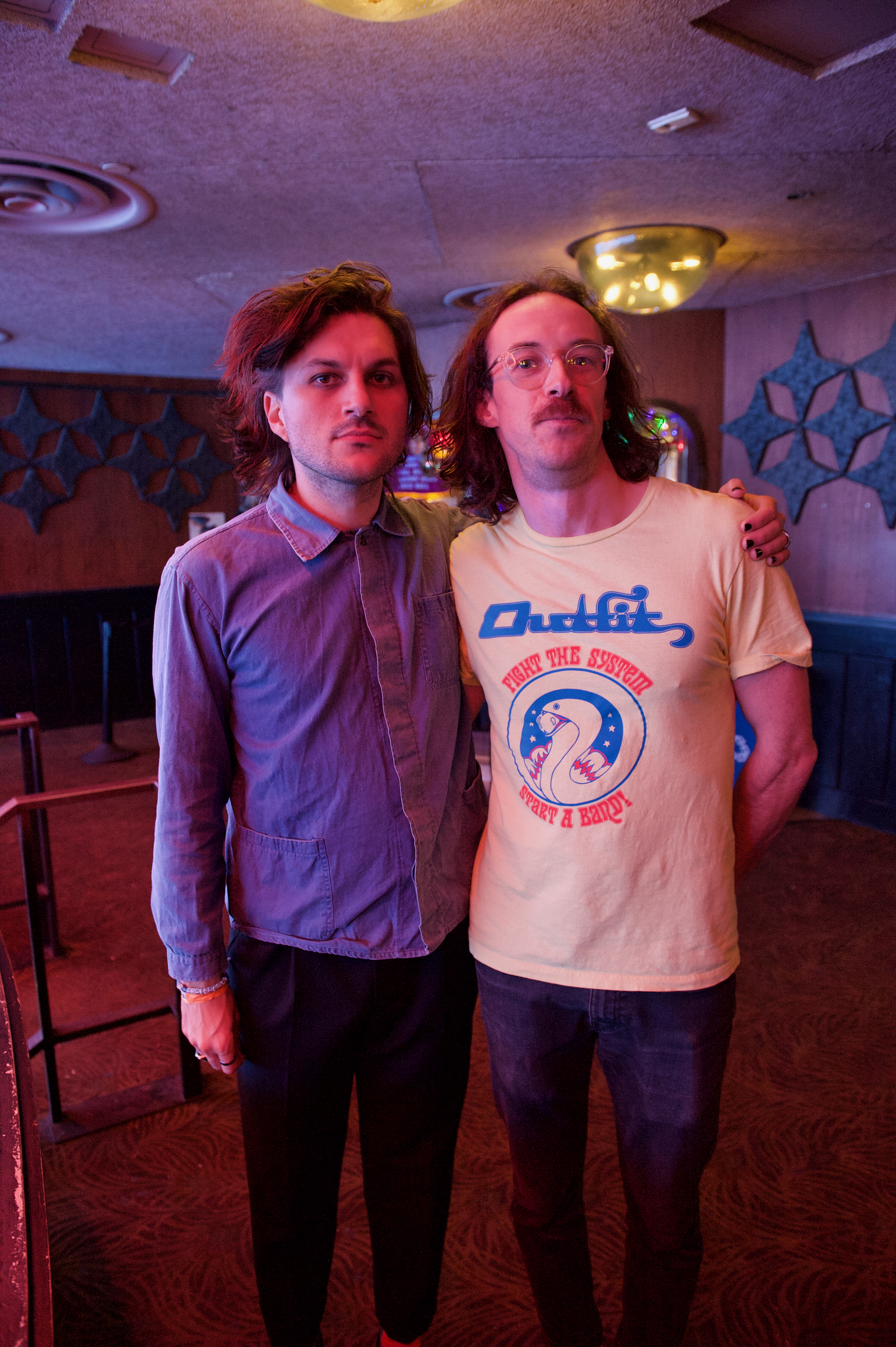
Kerr (left) with drummer Cole George

Hotel Mira's wide-ranging musical influences include Nirvana, Frank Ocean, Queens of the Stone Age, Tame Impala, Led Zeppelin, Franz Ferdinand, Rage Against the Machine, Phoenix, White Stripes, Death from Above 1979, Foo Fighters, Pixies, Radiohead, Modest Mouse, St. Vincent, Red Hot Chili Peppers, Tokyo Police Club, Black Sabbath, Dirty Projectors, Local Natives, and Gorillaz.

They have also long been a supporter of the LGBT community, women's rights, and mental health issues, as evidenced by the singles "Brandon", "Mushrooms", and "Bully for You", along with several gigs they have played over the years supporting all of these causes. In May 2019, Charlie Kerr gave an interview to the British Columbia Schizophrenia Society about his own struggles with mental health and how music was a vital antidote to the very serious disorders he has suffered from for most of his life—and that right treatment also made all the difference. "I started treating myself with some kindness for the first time", he admitted. "I realized that since I didn't have a neurotypical brain, it was okay if I experienced life a bit differently, and that was more freeing than defeating".

Kerr is Indigenous and identifies as Cree/Métis. In January 2020, he was invited to speak to the Métis Nation of Alberta via the "Headstrong" anti-stigma program through the Mental Health Commission of Canada. Such was the positive response, he was invited to return to speak again the following month.

The band also took a clear position in the summer of 2020 in response to the Black Lives Matter protests against police brutality, stating on their Facebook page: "We have, and always will, stand in solidarity with BIPOC. As a band, we refuse to lend our name and music to any power structure unwilling to look at and change their racism"—pulling out of a local virtual Canada Day municipal concert for this reason.

== Tour history ==
=== As JPNSGRLS: 2014–2016 ===
In 2014, as JPNSGRLS, the band toured extensively in Canada, the United States, and Asia.

Beginning as tour support for their labelmates Mounties across Western Canada, they then played several individual gigs, festivals, and showcases, including JUNOFEST in Winnipeg; Music Matters Live in Singapore; NXNE in Toronto; Rifflandia Music Festival in Victoria BC; Canadian Indie Week in Toronto; and the CMJ Music Marathon in New York City.

In March 2015, JPNSGRLS made their debut at SXSW in Austin, Texas.

In April and May 2015, the group embarked on their first full-length tour of the UK and Europe, with individual dates in England, Germany, France, and the Netherlands, along with several festivals–including the Hit the Deck Festival in Bristol/Nottingham, the Great Escape Festival in Brighton, and the Liverpool Sound City festival.

Both the European and British press made note of the band's live shows on this tour. The German press remarked on JPNSGRLS' particular mix of influences and how they played out live, calling their sound "a bit grungy, a little blues, a pinch of post-punk, the full program alt-rock – and implemented on a very unique, modern way".

However, it was the British music press that were the most moved by the band's performances and indeed the anticipation of same. In Brighton, the band "had a line down the street to try and witness their much lauded performances", while the Nottingham press declared that JPNSGRLS "were not only a pleasure to watch, but a pleasure to listen to, playing an incredibly tightly woven set of songs, full of intensity and gusto." In Birmingham, Kerr drew particular attention as "he gyrates and dances like Jagger, (and) wraps himself around the mic stand like Julian Casablancas".

It was JPNSGRLS' final date on this tour, in Liverpool at the Sound City Festival, which cemented their international live reputation. Kerr, already known for his physical dynamism onstage, accidentally split his head open on metal risers holding Serl's drums in place. Undeterred, both he and the band continued the set to a double encore, with Kerr bleeding profusely, stating, "How's this for a deal? I bled for you, you can dance for me". It was coincidentally the day before Kerr's birthday, and he ended the set by saying, "In just two hours I'm going to turn 24, and I can't think of any better place to be than here with you and a head trauma". This left the local press commenting on the "insane beauty" of the band.

Throughout the rest of 2015 into early 2016, JPNSGRLS continued to perform at festivals, individual gigs, and showcases across Canada and the United States–once again taking in CMJ Music Marathon and the Taste of Edmonton, as well as new ones with Sofar, Breakout West, and the Pemberton Music Festival. One reviewer called the latter performance "genuine, passionate and intimate".

In April 2016, JPNSGRLS embarked on a two-month international tour. The first leg was a cross-Canada jaunt that finished at Canadian Music Week in Toronto. The second leg segued to the UK and Europe. These dates included opening for the Heavy, the Camden Rocks festival, and individual headline gigs. In Europe, the band travelled to Belgium, Germany, France, Switzerland, and the Netherlands. Glasgow critics said the band "sprung the place (to) life with their frenetic riff-rock". Music site Gigs North East stated in their review of the Newcastle performance that "JPNSGRLS have such a distinctive sound. What's impressive is how all their genre stylings mesh together to create real quality." While in Germany, JPNSGRLS were interviewed and played several unplugged songs for German music television institution Rockpalast. Their live concert performance in Cologne was recorded, and broadcast by Rockpalast in July 2016.

In August 2016, JPNSGRLS announced the Divorce World Tour via Facebook and Twitter, with initial dates with Fizzy Blood declared for the UK and Europe in November 2016, and dates for Canada and the United States to follow. The band first toured across Canada, then the States, through Europe—including for the first time Italy and Denmark—and finishing in the UK. Leeds music site GigSoup stated that the band's gig there was a "masterclass on how to play a rock and roll show", and that "(the band) were extraordinary, one of the best live performance(s) of this year". In Glasgow, music site Musicscramble observed the strength of a band late in a two-month tour playing to a small crowd—noting that the group were "still thriving and feeding off the energy provided by a pocket of fervent gig-goers", continuing that the music itself was "both manic and serene all at once. You can feel the rocky undertone trying to break free from the pop shackles that seem to tame it". This tour was the last one with the 2016 band lineup of Kerr, Serl, McClelland, and Lauro.

=== As Hotel Mira: 2018–present ===
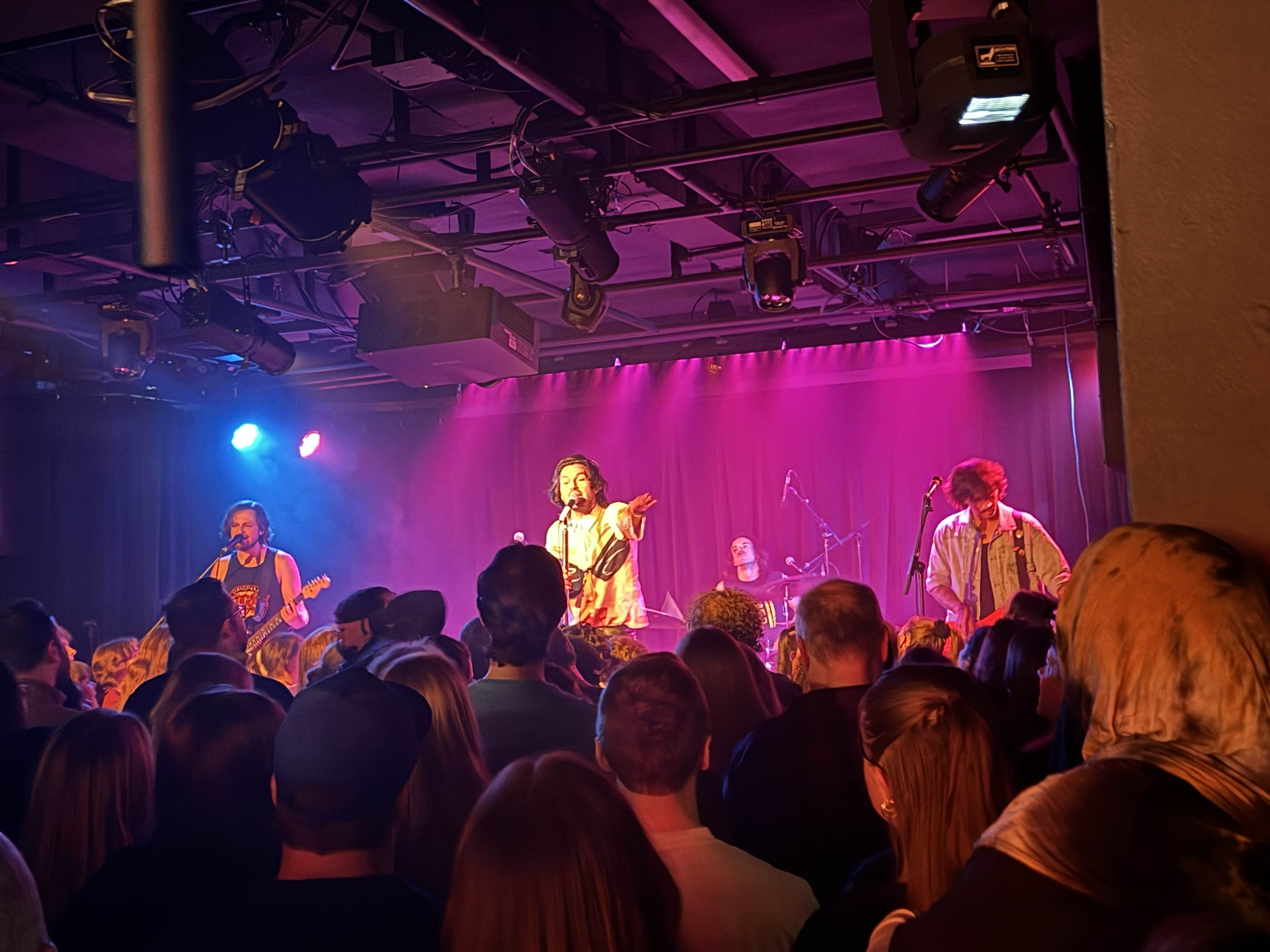
Hotel Mira performing at Club SAW in Ottawa on October 24, 2025

In 2018, Hotel Mira debuted the new lineup by their first gig at the Biltmore Hotel in April. This was quickly followed by several one-off gigs around Vancouver and Victoria. In May 2018, the band played several shows as part of Canadian Music Week, including but not limited to the then-Adelaide Hall (now Radio). On seeing the gig at Adelaide Hall, Peter Montreuil, writing for Bob Segarini's blog, described Kerr "as a very animated frontman who has some powerful lyrics to work with", going on to muse: "A picture paints a thousand words? He showed a documentary with less than 10 words and a gesture. I am so glad that I was there to witness that."

In November 2018, Hotel Mira toured Western Canada on Ubiquitous Synergy Seeker's Bonavista tour, along with the Elwins and Shotty Horroh.

Throughout 2019, Hotel Mira continued local one-off gigs, and in January 2020, they announced a limited Western Canada tour to promote the Perfectionism album. However, that and a subsequent US tour that had been booked was cancelled due to lockdowns related to the COVID-19 pandemic, as Kerr explained in an interview with Adam Lisicky of Bringin' it Backwards, in association with American Songwriter. "So I booked an entire US tour by myself, that was gonna happen in the summer (of 2020)... and the day we were applying was the day before lockdown – so we were planning on touring all summer and stuff... but the saving grace is that 'This Could Be It for Me' got on the radio and got past some gatekeepers and wound up charting and ended up charting quite well... so we've had radio success all through 2020 and a bit of 2021... so it's been super kind of bittersweet and weird... I'm really grateful, obviously."

Hotel Mira continued to perform where possible, in limited virtual safer streaming settings throughout 2020 and into 2021. In October 2021, the band, thanking their fans for their patience, announced a cross-Canada tour in support of the Zolas, with twelve dates in November and December 2021.

June 2022 brought Hotel Mira's return to regular performing, with the announcement of a tour of the United States, dubbed "the United States of A-mira-ca" tour for July and August 2022—shared with the Zolas. Prior to this tour beginning, they also announced a gig opening for Billy Talent.

== Band members ==
=== JPNSGRLS ===
- Charlie Kerr – vocals (2010–2018)
- Oliver Mann – lead guitar (2010–2016)
- Christopher McClelland – bass (2010–2017)
- Graham Serl – drums (2010–2017)
- Colton Lauro – lead guitar (2016–2018)
- Simon Eltermon – bass
- Sam Rutledge – drums

=== Hotel Mira ===
Current

- Charlie Kerr – vocals (2018–present)
- Mike Noble – bass (2018–present)
- Clark Grieve – guitar, keyboards (2018–present)
- Cole George – drums (2018–present)

Past

- Colton Lauro – lead guitar (2018–2021)

== Discography ==
=== JPNSGRLS ===
- The Sharkweek EP (2013)
- Circulation (2014)
- Divorce (2016)

=== Hotel Mira ===
- Hotel Mira (EP, 2018)
- Perfectionism (2020)
- I Am Not Myself (2023)
- I Am Not Much Help (EP, 2024)
- Pity Party (2025)
