= Fake Shark =

Canadian electronic indie-pop band

- Origin: Vancouver, British Columbia, Canada
- Genres: Alternative; Indie pop; Indie rock; post-hardcore; dance-punk; art punk
- Years active: 2005–present
- Labels: Light Organ; 604 Records; Warner Music
- Members: Kevvy; Louis Wu; Alex Glassford; Jake Fox
- Past members: Eryyk Novak; Tony Dallas; Dan Hughes; Parker Bossley; Malcolm Holt; Jason Crockford

Fake Shark (formerly known as Fake Shark – Real Zombie!) is a Canadian alternative rock band from Vancouver, British Columbia. Originally formed in 2005, while their early musical style mainly combined elements of dance punk, post-hardcore and IDM, the group gradually evolved to a more commercially streamlined sound in 2015, within the realm of indie rock, electro pop, new wave and slacker rock. They are best known for their 2021 hit single, "Loser", which charted to #3 on the Canadian alternative radio and are currently signed to Canadian independent label, Light Organ Records.

The band's current line-up consists of founding members and primary songwriters; lead vocalist, Kevin "Kevvy" Maher, guitarist, Louis Hearn (under the stage name, "Louis Wu") along with drummer, Alex Glassford and multi-instrumentalist, Jake Fox. As "Fake Shark", the group have released four studio albums via Light Organ; Faux Real (2017), Time for the Future (2021), Afterglow (2024). and Rhythm Prism (2026).

Over the course of their career, Fake Shark have toured extensively across North America, Asia, The United Kingdom, and Europe, and have shared the stage and collaborated with the likes of artists, such as Mindless Self Indulgence, Hot Hot Heat, Klaxons, Die Mannequin, Annie Hardy, Hannah Georgas, Kool Keith, The Darcys, and The Glorious Sons to name a few. Additionally, their music has also been featured in a number of high-profile commercial and television placements, such as Apple, Famous in Love, Love Island, MTV's Catfish, The NHL's Hockey Night in Canada on Sportsnet and NFL Monday Night Football.

== History ==
=== Early years and Zebra! Zebra! (2005–2007) ===
Fake Shark was conceived by producer/songwriters, Kevin "Kevvy Mental" Maher and Louis Wu in September 2005, as a way of combining the styles of the bands they liked in hopes to one day open for them. Having met while attending a fine arts high school in Langley, British Columbia, the pair formed "Fake Shark – Real Zombie!" shortly after graduation, and recruiting original bassist, Dan Hughes and drummer, Malcolm Holt to complete the lineup. The band's original name, being a reference to Lucio Fulci's 1979 horror film Zombi 2, where a real shark and a zombie engage in combat. The group would quickly gain a cult following online and overseas after making strong connections in the United Kingdom and touring with short-lived British dance-punk band, Test Icicles (featuring a then unknown Dev Hynes), and eventually end up joining them on stage during their infamous final show on April 22. 2006 at the famed Astoria Theatre in London, England following their announced break-up a few months prior.

In 2007, Hughes would leave the band and be replaced by musician and songwriter, Parker Bossley who would go on to join Canadian indie rock band, Hot Hot Heat concurrently the following year. The onslaught of MySpace buzz garnered the interest of Japanese record label, Vinyl Junkie who released the band's debut album, Zebra! Zebra! on April 25, 2007. The album was met with critical acclaim and commercial fanfare, (including life-sized cut-outs of the band's members at HMV stores in Tokyo) with media outlets likening them as the Canadian answer to American post-hardcore band, The Blood Brothers and "Fake Shark – Real Zombie!" would tour internationally to sold-out dates and festival appearances between Japan, the UK and North America in support of the album. This further garnered the group even more considerable exposure to a bigger audience and high-profile fans including, a young and yet to be discovered Charli XCX and former Black Flag singer, Henry Rollins, who named Fake Shark – Real Zombie! as "one of his favorite new bands" and would play the band several times on his Indie 103.1 FM radio show, Harmony in My Head.

=== Meeting People Is Terrible (2008–2010) ===
During Summer 2008, the band would enter the studio with Canadian music producer, Dave "Rave" Ogilvie (known for his work with Skinny Puppy, Jakalope, Marilyn Manson, and Nine Inch Nails) to work on their next record. The result would be the band's second studio album, Meeting People Is Terrible, released August 26, 2009, via Vinyl Junkie in Japan. A sophomore effort just as eclectic as their first, expanding their brand of genre-bending post-hardcore to even more styles, such as funk and industrial. The album was preceded by lead single, "Angel Lust", which was released as an EP on January 9, 2009, containing three additional tracks from the subsequent record, that served as a preview before its release. All the songs on the EP would later go on to be included in the music video game, Rock Band 2 as downloadable content in the game's online, Rock Band Network launched initially on March 4, 2010, via Xbox 360. The band would also release a cover of "Sour Times" by the British trip-hop band, Portishead, on their MySpace page soon after as a stand-alone single.

=== Liar (2012–2014) ===
In 2012, Fake Shark – Real Zombie! signed to Canadian record label, Light Organ Records, a subsidiary of 604 Records run by entertainment lawyer, Jonathan Simkin and local musician and friend of the band, Tony Dallas would join the group as their new bassist, (following the departures of Bossley and Holt from the group in 2010). On September 18, 2012, Fake Shark – Real Zombie! premiered "Girls", the first single off their next album featuring Hot Hot Heat's lead singer, Steve Bays. The single marked a considerable shift in the band's sound, moving away from the post-hardcore styling of their early material into a new territory of off-kilter pop for the group, which set the tone for their third studio album, Liar released February 14, 2014 via Light Organ and Universal Music Group.

The album's expansive list of producers and collaborators included Bays, Ogilvie, Henry Rollins, Greig Nori, Jimmy Urine, Care Failure of Die Mannequin, Adaline, Japanese Voyeurs, and The Birthday Massacre. Liar was preceded by remaining singles, Get Weird and Paint It Gold released January 31 and April 16, 2013, respectively. Following its release, Fake Shark – Real Zombie! toured across parts of North America, Europe and Asia throughout 2013 into the next year, including serving as a support act, along with 604 Records artist, Jessica Lee for Marianas Trench guitarist, Matt Webb's 2014 Canadian tour in promotion of his second EP, The Right Direction during the spring of 2014. Fake Shark – Real Zombie! concluded the year releasing the single, "Can't See You" featuring Danny Lohner, formerly of Nine Inch Nails (under his artist pseudonym "Renholdër") for the soundtrack of The Soska Sisters' 2014 horror film See No Evil 2 starring WWE professional wrestler, Kane on November 10, 2014.

=== Faux Real and name change and (2015–2017) ===
In 2015, the band would refine their sound even further and officially change their name to "Fake Shark" following the release of their debut single "Cheap Thrills", on July 10, 2015. The single, produced by Steve Bays, premiered via DJ Chris Hawkins' BBC 6 Radio show in the UK and would later go on to be featured in an Apple ad campaign entitled "Close Your Rings" in promotion of the company's Series 2 Watch. Fake Shark embarked on a pair of back-to-back North American tours supporting Die Mannequin and Edmonton hard rock band, Royal Tusk respectively between the fall of 2015 and spring of 2016. Within this period, the band released a follow up single, "Something Special" off their upcoming album on May 13, 2016. The song would go on to hit the number #1 position on Spotify's Canadian Rock chart.

On March 20, 2017, the band announced their first album as "Fake Shark", Faux Real which arrived May 26, 2017, via Light Organ and Sony Music. The announcement was made in-tandem with the release of the album's third single, "Heart 2 Heart". The single's music video, by Ben Knechtel (director of Carly Rae Jepsen's video for her breakthrough single, Call Me Maybe) premiered via Billboard.com on April 12, 2017. Fake Shark would continue touring and making festival appearances across North America and the UK throughout the remainder of 2017. Around this time, touring members, drummer Alex Glassford and keyboardist, Jake Fox would also be officially inducted into the group.

=== Walking Through a Fantasy, House of Mirrors EP's and Time for the Future (2018–2022) ===
The band would continue releasing new music immediately the following year, with a succession of singles throughout 2018 beginning with, "Wake Up" featuring Light Organ twin sister act, "Fionn" on April 27, 2018, followed by "Feel Alive" and "Smile" on August 16, and September 27, 2018, respectively. All three tracks were later revealed to be part of their debut EP, Walking Through a Fantasy which arrived October 26. 2018 via Light Organ.

Going into 2020, Fake Shark would follow-up with another cycle of singles, for their second EP, House of Mirrors released on July 20, 2020, led by lead single, "Invincible" on November 19, 2019, that would receive The Soska Sisters-directed music video premiere via horror fiction platform, Rue Morgue on December 15, 2019. Latter singles, "Bad Chemistry" and "Superstitious Thing", produced by Canadian music producer, Ryan Worsley would go on to be released February 28, and May 20, 2020 leading up to the EP's release. Due to the global COVID-19 pandemic, the band was unable to tour or perform publicly in promotion of it. Following House of Mirrors, they would release a cover of 1997 one-hit wonder, "Your Woman" by the British musical artist, White Town on November 27, 2020, that would chart to #4 on Canadian alternative radio.

Over the course of 2021, the band returned to the studio to complete their next full-length, including working once again with Worsley (recognized for his work with Canadian acts, Dear Rouge and MONOWHALES) on their breakout hit single, "Loser" released September 17, 2021, which went on to chart at #3 on Breaking Alt (Alternative Specialty) and #9 on Alternative Radio in Canada. Fake Shark's second studio album, Time For The Future would arrive on November 5, 2021, via Light Organ and Warner Music Canada, preceded by album-titled single, "Time for the Future" on June 11, and "Quicksand" on August 6, 2021. The band would go on to be nominated for Album of the Year, Song of the Year, Rock/Alternative Group of the Year at the 2022 INDIE Awards in Toronto during CMW.

In the midst of the album's release, Fake Shark would also be featured on the fourth season of American literary podcast, Storybound on July 20, 2021, with their music interspersed and remixed by Jude Brewer, over narrated excerpts of the book The First Ten Years: Two Sides of the Same Love Story by Joseph Fink and Meg Bashwiner of Welcome to Nightvale fame.

=== Afterglow (2023–2024) ===
Over the next year, Fake Shark would incrementally release a series of singles leading up to their next album throughout 2023, with the first being, "Paranoid", released on September 23, 2022. "Paranoid" would soon be followed up by "Save Me" on February 17, which would chart to #3 on Breaking Alt (Alternative Specialty), "Bummer Summer" on July 22, and last single " Exactly What I Thought You Were" on September 29, 2023, which would reach 1# on Canadian Alternative Radio. All the singles would receive considerable airplay on Canadian radio with spins by terrestrial stations, such as; The Verge SXM, Sonic 104.9, 102.1 The Edge, The Zone @ 91-3, X92.9 Calgary, and X100.7 Red Deer.

Fake Shark would also be featured in the horror film, Festival of the Living Dead released April 5, 2024, exclusively through Tubi, directed by The Soska Sisters.

On December 11, 2023, Fake Shark announced their third studio album, Afterglow which arrived on January 12, 2024, via Light Organ and Warner Music. Release of the album was immediately followed by a Canadian 2024 Winter Tour as direct support for Light Organ label mates, Hotel Mira in support of their second studio album "I Am Not Myself".

=== Rhythm Prism (2025–present) ===
On January 13, 2025, Fake Shark announced a new single, "Bang Bang Bang" which was released on February 7, 2025, via Light Organ. Around this time, touring member, Erryk Novak would officially join the group (following the departure of longtime bassist, Dallas in 2024.) A few months later, the group released the follow-up single, "I'm With Stupid" featuring Pat Gillett of Down With Webster on April 4, 2025. Shortly thereafter, Fake Shark embarked on a co-headlining East Coast North American tour with American alternative rock/jazz band, "Johnny Manchild and the Poor Bästards" during the spring of 2025.

On July 10, 2025, the band would release a third single, "Monster", coinciding with their appearance at the Calgary Stampede, where they served as the opening act for Marianas Trench at National Saloon on the same day. "Monster" would go on to chart at #1 on Breaking Alt upon its debut to Canadian alternative radio. December 1, 2025, Fake Shark announced their fourth studio album, Rhythm Prism which released on January 16, 2026, via Light Organ and Warner Music. The album was preceded by remaining single, "Tired of You" featuring Fionn, on September 12, 2025.

== Members ==
Current

- Kevin "Kevvy" Maher – lead vocals, production, programming, bass, guitar, synthesizer (2005–present)
- Louis Wu – guitar, bass, backing vocals (2005–present)
- Alex Glassford – drums, percussion (2017–present; touring 2015–2017) backing vocals (2021–present)
- Jake Fox – keyboards, synth (2017–present; touring 2015–2017) guitar (2021–present)

Former

- Dan Hughes – bass (2005–2007)
- Malcolm Holt – drums (2005–2010)
- Parker Bossley – bass, backing vocals (2007–2010)
- Jason Crockford – drums (2011–2015)
- Tony Dallas – bass, backing vocals (2012–2024) drums (touring 2010–2011)
- Eryyk Novak – bass, backing vocals (2025; touring 2024)

Touring

- Nick Yacyshyn – drums (2006)
- Miles Chic – bass (2010–2012)

== Discography ==
=== As "Fake Shark – Real Zombie!" ===
- Zebra! Zebra! (2007)
- Meeting People Is Terrible (2009)
- Liar (2013)

=== As "Fake Shark" ===
- Faux Real (2017)
- Time For The Future (2021)
- Afterglow (2024)
- Rhythm Prism (2026)

==== EPs ====
- Walking Through A Fantasy (2018)
- House of Mirrors (2020)

== Awards and nominations ==
Year	Organization	Award	Work	Result
2022	Jim Beam® Indie Awards	Album of the Year	Time for The Future	Nominated
2022	Jim Beam® Indie Awards	Song of the Year	"Loser"	Nominated
2022	Jim Beam® Indie Awards	Rock/Alternative Group of the Year	Fake Shark	Nominated
