= Kevin James Maher =

Kevvy Mental
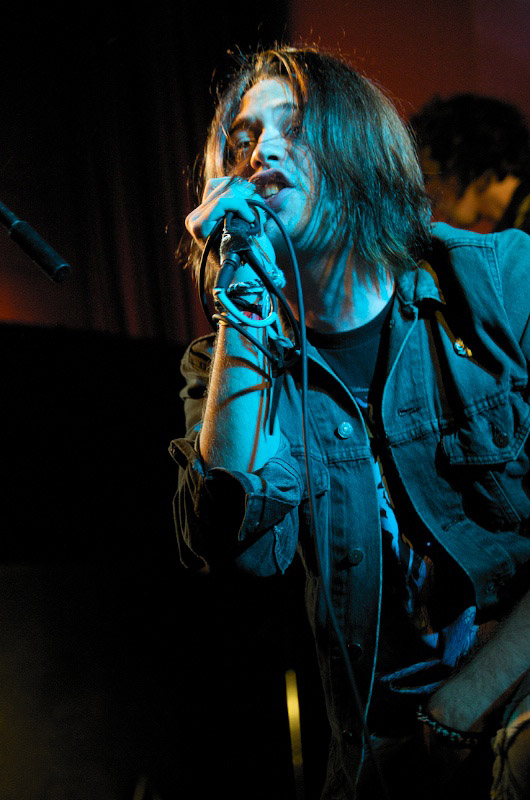
- Kevvy Mental on stage in 2009. Photo by: Scott Alexander.

Background information
- Born: Kevin James Maher; April 20, 1988 (age 37); Edmonton, Alberta, Canada
- Genres: Puke-rawk, alternative rock, hip-hop
- Occupations: Musician, songwriter, sound designer, record producer
- Instruments: Vocals, guitar, synthesizer
- Years active: 2007–present

Kevin James Maher (born April 20, 1988), better known as Kevvy Mental, is a Canadian musician, producer, film composer and remix artist most notable for his work in Fake Shark as lead vocalist and programmer.

== Early life ==
Maher was born an only child in Edmonton, Alberta, and raised in Langley, British Columbia, by a single mother. Maher attended Langley Fine Arts School majoring in visual art. Maher was kicked out of Langley Fine Arts in his grade 12 year. Maher attended Walnut Grove Secondary to finish his high school education. During his time at Walnut Grove, Maher also attended AI Burnaby for audio engineering.

== Musical career ==
Maher is primarily a vocalist in the band Fake Shark, but also plays guitar, piano and programs electronics. He has done a variety of remixes, listed below. He has also programmed electronics and contributed vocals to Jakalope, as well as working alongside Dave Ogilvie coproducing the debut album by former Lillix bass player Louise Burns. The record was nominated for the Polaris Music Prize.

In 2008, Maher teamed up with writer/director CJ Wallis to score the Sarah Slean short film Last Flowers. The film received a pair of Leo Awards nominations in 2009.

In 2012, co-wrote and produced part of Carly Rae Jepsen's new record, Kiss, and wrote the Fake Shark - Real Zombie! record Liar. He has also composed some of the music for the film American Mary.

== Influence ==
Maher cites a wide array of artists as influences. As a child, he listened to the Wu-Tang Clan. He has been quoted as listening to almost nothing but rap music and jazz. He is a huge fan of Tyler the Creator, Christian Scott, Nirvana, and Mike Patton. He is known to have a friendship with Matt Webb, guitarist of Canadian pop-rock band Marianas Trench.

Another influence and friend is Henry Rollins of Black Flag.

== Credits ==
- Fake Shark - Real Zombie! – Zebra! Zebra! Band Member (2007)
- Fake Shark - Real Zombie! – Meeting People Is Terrible Band Member (2009)
- Fan Death – A Coin for the Well (Audio Engineering) (2009)
- Fan Death – Womb of Dreams (Audio Engineering) (2010)
- Jakalope – Things That Go Jump in the Night – Vocals, Programming, Production (2010)
- Louise Burns – Mellow Drama – Producer (2010)
- The Birthday Massacre – Pins and Needles – Programming, Editing (2010)
- Raggedy Angry – How I Learned To Love Our Robot Overlords – Vocals (2010)
- Matt Webb of Marianas Trench (band) – EP Producer (2011)
- Carly Rae Jepsen – Kiss – Writer / Producer (2012)
- Jessica Lee – Carried Away – Producer (2012)
- Fighting For Ithaca – To the Rescue Song Writer (2012)
- Anami Vice – Are You Serious – Producer (2012)
- Cat Thomson – TBA – Producer (2012)
- We Need Surgery – Self Titled – Producer (2012)
- The Birthday Massacre – Hide and Seek – Synthesizer / Drums (2012)
- Kat Von D – TBA – Writer
- Fighting For Ithaca – Do What We Wanna – Writer
- Fake Shark - Real Zombie! – Liar – Writer/Producer
- Paige Morgan – TBA – Producer
- Down With Webster – TBA – Writer
- Kate Morgan – TBA – Producer/Writer
- Carly Rae Jepsen – Emotion Side B - Writer (2016)
