= Yolk of the Golden Egg =

Studio album by Dandi Wind
- Released: September 23, 2008
- Recorded: 2008
- Genre: Post-industrial, electropunk, electronica
- Label: Summer Lovers Unlimited Music, Tell Me Records
- Producer: Szam Findlay

Dandi Wind chronology
Concrete Igloo (2006)	Yolk of the Golden Egg (2008)

Yolk of the Golden Egg is the second full-length album by Canadian post-industrial band Dandi Wind. All songs were written and produced by Szam Findlay, with Dandilion Wind Opaine providing vocals.

== Critical reception ==
CITR-FM described the album as "violent in spirit" and "not always accessible", yet still a "worthwhile...sonic journey that challenges every spectrum of electronica." Exclaim! wrote that the album was "the electro equivalent of a machinegun blowing the locks off of cheerier electro duos", claiming that Opaine's vocals are "the most aggressive of the instruments."

== Track listing ==
(all songs written by Szam Findlay)

1. Battle Of Verdun
2. A Lifetime
3. Adolescent
4. Powerball
5. Cocoon
6. Baying Of The Hounds
7. Silver Lying
8. Midget Palace
9. Yo Pinok
10. Johatsu
11. Foundling Circle
12. Dance Of The Paralytic
