= Concrete Igloo =

Studio album by Dandi Wind
- Released: January 2006
- Recorded: 2005
- Genre: Post-industrial, electropunk, electronica, experimental
- Length: 44:45
- Label: Summer Lovers Unlimited Music
- Producer: Szam Findlay

Dandi Wind chronology
Concrete Igloo (2006)	Yolk of the Golden Egg (2008)

Concrete Igloo is the first full-length album by Canadian post-industrial band Dandi Wind. All songs were written and produced by Szam Findlay, with Dandilion Wind Opaine providing vocals.

== Critical reception ==
Drowned in Sound wrote that the album is "energetic, confrontational and bizarre electronic noise with a strong vein of inventive humour and a breathless speediness to its rhythms" and has a "varied and somewhat deranged set of subject matter...one which surely requires a varied and somewhat deranged melodic setting".

== Track listing ==
(all songs written by Szam Findlay)

No.	Title	Length
1.	"Pluck It Out"	3:19
2.	"Flooded Grass"	3:03
3.	"Balloon Factory"	3:10
4.	"Slumlord"	4:07
5.	"Shrapnel"	3:34
6.	"Apotemnophilia"	2:24
7.	"Utopia Now"	2:27
8.	"Hostages"	4:38
9.	"2010"	2:15
10.	"Hitch Hiker"	3:32
11.	"Einsteinbrains"	4:30
12.	"Kindergarten Cop"	3:15
13.	"Biddings"	3:58
14.	"Mafu Cage"	2:33
