= A Coin for the Well =

EP by Fan Death
- Released: February 1, 2010
- Recorded: 2009
- Genre: Synthpop; Italo disco
- Length: 19:40
- Label: Pharmacy
- Producer: Szam Findlay

Fan Death chronology
A Coin for the Well (2010)	Womb of Dreams (2010)

A Coin For The Well is the third EP by Fan Death. It was released February 1, 2010.

== Track listing ==
No.	Title	Length
1.	"Reunited"	3:10
2.	"Cannibal"	4:34
3.	"Power Surge"	4:24
4.	"Soon"	3:53
5.	"The Son Will Rise"	4:15

== Personnel ==
- Producer – Szam Findlay
- Vocals – Dandilion Wind Opaine, Marta Jacuibek-McKeever
- Music – Szam Findlay, Dandilion Wind Opaine,
- Lyrics – Dandilion Wind Opaine

Additional musicians

- Ariel Barnes – Cello
- Max Murphy – Baritone saxophone
- Dameian Walsh – Alto saxophone
- Nimish Parekh – Trombone
- Kent Wallace – Trumpet
- Markus Takizawa – Viola
- Mark Ferris – 1st Violin
- Cameron Wilson – 2nd Violin
- Parker Bossley – Bass (track 4)

Production

- Mike Marsh – Audio mastering
- Eric Broucek – Mixing
- Leo Chadburn – String & Horn Arrangement/Conductor
- Matt Anderson – Additional Drum Programming (tracks 2–5)
- Kevin James Maher – Vocal and Bass Engineer
- Scott Ternan – String & Horn Engineer
