= Szam Findlay =

Canadian electronic music producer

Szam Findlay is a Canadian electronic music producer who has been active since 1998. While still a teenager he was signed to Rough Trade Publishing. Subsequently, while still in high school his debut album Die Hautfabrik was released by Resonant Recordings/Todtenschlaf in 2001 to acclaim from BBC, Allmusic, and Incursion. This release marked the beginning of a longtime collaboration with performance artist Dandilion Wind Opaine who provided the artwork for the booklet.

In 2003, the two embarked on a decade long collaboration that encompassed the projects Dandi Wind and Fan Death. Dandi Wind released 2 full-length albums, 5 EPs, and a handful of singles amidst extensive global touring alongside bands such as Klaxons, The Horrors, The Presets, Final Fantasy, Simian Mobile Disco, and Broken Social Scene. The project was terminated in 2010.

In 2007, with the addition of Marta Jaciubek McKeever the Fan Death project was created. An EP and full-length album was released on Mercury/Universal/Last Gang Records following singles on Erol Alkan's Phantasy Sounds and Tokyo's Big Love records. In support of these releases live shows were performed with Florence and the Machine, Metronomy, Telepathe, Late of the Pier, and Franz Ferdinand in addition to a full European tour supporting Vampire Weekend. As of 2011, Findlay has continued the project with new vocalists Kasia Elizabeth and Tessa Marie.

In 2012, both 100% Silk and Big Love Records released 12" EPs from a new collaboration with Manderson under the name Body Double.

The website for the 2013 documentary Fall/Winter references his contributions to the score of the film. In 2013, a full-length album entitled The Fairer Sex by new vocal project Cry Blue Sky was released via Todtenschlaf.

== Discography ==
=== Albums ===
as Szam Findlay:

- Die Hautfabrik (2001)

Dandi Wind:

- Concrete Igloo (2005)
- Yolk Of The Golden Egg (2008)

Fan Death:

- Womb of Dreams (2010)
- sssistersss (2012)

Cry Blue Sky:

- The Fairer Sex (2013)

=== Singles and EPs ===
Dandi Wind:

- Bait The Traps (2005)
- Break The Bone And Suck The Marrow From It (2005)
- Nofuncity (2006)
- Apotemnophilia / Adolescent (2007)
- Sacrificial (2007)
- A Smile Before Death (2007)
- Sleeping Beauty (2008)
- Decontaminate (2008)
- Dead Gods, Dandi Wind - Split (2009)

Fan Death:

- Veronica's Veil (2008)
- Cannibal (2009)
- A Coin for the Well (2010)
- Awakenings (2012)

Body Double:

- My Life <What You Need> (2012)
- No Time (2012)

=== Remixes ===
Dandi Wind:

- The Horrors - Draw Japan (2007)
- Plasticzooms - Under///Black (2009)

Fan Death:

- Ladyhawke - My Delirium (2008)
- Frankmusik - Better Off As Two (2009)
- The Virgins - Teen Lovers (2009)
- Lindstrom - Love Sick (2009)
- Lost Valentinos - Midnights (2009)
- Datarock - Give It Up (2009)
