= Tom Dobrzanski =

Canadian record producer, engineer, mixer and musician

Tom Dobrzanski is a Canadian record producer, engineer, mixer and musician. He is based in Vancouver, BC. He is a former member of the rock band The Zolas, and the owner of Monarch Studios. He began his recording career in 2001 with Vertical Studios, which he built in his parents' basement. He has recorded albums for local bands such as Said the Whale, Hey Ocean!, We Are the City and more. In October 2012 he officially opened Monarch Studios.

Dobrzanski has been nominated for multiple Western Canadian Music Awards including Producer of the Year and Engineer of the Year.

In 2013, Dobrzanski received a Juno Award nomination for Said the Whale's Little Mountain.

== Selected discography ==
Year	Band	Album	Role
2007	Hey Ocean!	Stop Looking Like Music	Producer, Mixer
2007	Lotus Child	Gossip Diet	Co-producer, Composer, Engineer
2008	Said the Whale	Howe Sounds/Taking Abalonia	Producer, Mixer
2009	Hey Ocean!	It's Easier To Be Somebody Else	Additional Engineering
2009	Said the Whale	Islands Disappear	Co-Producer, Engineer
2009	The Zolas	Tic Toc Tic	Co-Producer, Musician, Co-writer
2010	Shad	TSOL	Additional Engineering
2010	We Are the City	In A Quiet World	Producer, Mixer, Engineer
2011	David Vertesi	Cardiography	Engineer
2011	We Are the City	High School	Producer, Mixer, Engineer
2011	Said the Whale	New Brighton EP	Producer, Mixer, Engineer
2012	The Zolas	Ancient Mars	Musician, Co-writer
2012	Said the Whale	Little Mountain	Producer, Engineer
2013	We Are the City	Violent	Producer, Mixer, Engineer
2013	Said the Whale	Hawaiii	Producer, Engineer
