= Zebra! Zebra! =

Studio album by Fake Shark - Real Zombie!
- Released: April 25, 2007 (Japan); March 11, 2008 (Worldwide)
- Recorded: 2006–2007
- Genre: Dance-punk, art-punk, IDM
- Length: 24:49
- Label: Vinyl Junkie (Japan); Phd Distribution (Canada)
- Producer: Andy Placek

Fake Shark - Real Zombie! chronology
Zebra! Zebra! (2007)	Meeting People Is Terrible (2009)

Zebra! Zebra! is the debut album from Vancouver dance-punk band Fake Shark - Real Zombie! released in Japan on April 25, 2007. The band was picked up by a Japanese label for the album release after their music went viral on MySpace. Originally meant as an EP, they decided to add a few more songs to make it a full album. The album was released internationally on March 11, 2008.

== Track listing ==
1. "Wolf Is The New The" – 1:34
2. "Panty Party Hand Cramp" – 2:27
3. "Crystal Compass" – 3:51
4. "Shame On You Scabs" – 1:59
5. "Designer Drugs" – 2:33
6. "Eenie Meanie" – 1:46
7. "Shoreditch Vampire (Dialtone)" – 1:50
8. "Dead Diy Die" – 1:10
9. "WTF" – 2:04
10. "Ferrits Beullers Day Off" – 2:23
11. "Pair of Dice" – 1:38
12. "Unusual Dorsal Features" – 7:25 (bonus track "These MC's")

== Personnel ==
- Kevin "Kevvy Mental" Maher – vocals, synths, programming, bass guitar
- Louis Wu – guitar, vocals, bass guitar
- Malcolm Holt – drums
- Dan Hughes – bass guitar
- Parker Bossley – live bass
