= Meeting People Is Terrible =

Studio album by Fake Shark - Real Zombie!
- Released: August 26, 2009 (Japan); May 31, 2010 (Worldwide)
- Recorded: Summer 2008
- Genre: Dance-punk, art punk
- Length: 45:52
- Label: Vinyl Junkie (Japan)
- Producer: Dave Ogilvie

Singles from Meeting People Is Terrible
- 1. "Angel Lust" Released: January 9, 2009; 2. "Siamese Disease" Released: August 19, 2009

Meeting People Is Terrible is the second album by Vancouver dance-punk band Fake Shark - Real Zombie!. Originally, it was set to be released April 25, 2009 in Canada but had been pushed back by the label to August 26, 2009 in Japan and international release May 31, 2010. The album contains the singles "Angel Lust" and "Siamese Disease". The album was preceded by the release of the Angel Lust EP, which contained songs included on the album. The album's title might be in reference to the Radiohead documentary Meeting People Is Easy.

The bonus track 'Puke Rawk' was produced, engineered and mixed by Hot Hot Heat singer Steve Bays.

== Track listing ==
| No. | Title | Length |
|---|---|---|
| 1. | "Six Sick Suck" | 2:27 |
| 2. | "Avril Kadaver" | 1:47 |
| 3. | "Siamese Disease" | 2:43 |
| 4. | "Running for the Razors" | 2:29 |
| 5. | "Jewellery" | 3:53 |
| 6. | "Angel Lust" | 4:10 |
| 7. | "Horses in Heaven" | 3:14 |
| 8. | "Sestri Levante" | 2:48 |
| 9. | "Cherry Lava" | 3:22 |
| 10. | "Love Lice" | 1:17 |
| 11. | "Don't Forget" | 17:42 |
| Total length: | | 45:52 |

Japanese bonus tracks
| No. | Title | Length |
|---|---|---|
| 12. | "Meeting People Is Terrible" | 2:54 |
| 13. | "Six Sick Suck" (Kevvy Mental Remix) | 2:59 |
| 14. | "Sestri Levante" (Kevvy Mental Remix) | 2:24 |
| Total length: | | 54:09 |

North American bonus track
| No. | Title | Length |
|---|---|---|
| 9. | "Puke Rawk" | 3:26 |

== Personnel ==
- Kevvy Mental – vocals, synths, programming
- Louis Wu – guitar, vocals
- Parker Bossley – bass, vocals
- Malcolm Holt – drums
