= Steve Bays =

Canadian musician

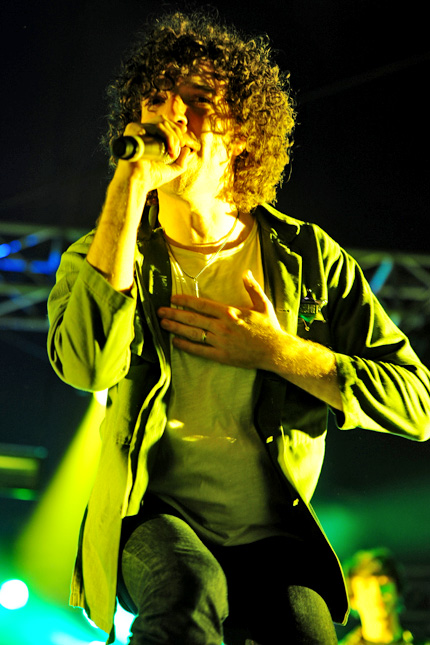
- Bays performing with Hot Hot Heat in 2011

Background information
- Genres: Indie rock, alternative, art punk
- Occupation(s): Musician, record producer, audio engineer
- Instrument(s): Keyboards, vocals
- Years active: 1999–present
- Labels: Dangerbird, Dine Alone, Sire, Warner Bros. Records

Steve Bays is a Canadian musician, audio engineer, and producer. He is a member of Canadian bands Left Field Messiah, Fur Trade, and Mounties. Bays was also the frontman and one of the founding members of Hot Hot Heat.

== Career ==
Bays has worked with a number of artists, either writing, recording, or producing, including The Zolas, Dear Rouge, We Are The City, The Killers, Diplo/Steve Aoki, Fitz and the Tantrums, Mounties, Born Ruffians, Mother Mother, Gay Nineties and Hawksley Workman.

== Selected discography ==
Year	Artist	Title	Label	Role
2013	Fur Trade	Don't Get Heavy: Released: July 22, 2013	Last Gang Records	Producer Engineer; Mixer
2014	Mounties	Thrash Rock Legacy: Released: March 4, 2014	Light Organ Records	Producer Engineer; Mixer
2014	Steve Aoki, Diplo, Deorro	22 Jump Street (Original Motion Picture Soundtrack) ("Freak"): Released: June 10, 2014	Republic Records	Co-writer Vocals
2014	JPNSGRLS	Circulation: Released: July 15, 2014	Light Organ Records	Producer Mixer
2015	Hawksley Workman	Old Cheetah: Released: June 2, 2015	Six Shooter Records	Producer Co-writer; Mixer
2015	We Are the City	Above Club ("Kiss Me Honey", "Cheque Room", "Heavy as a Brick", "Take Your Picture With Me While You Still Can"): Released: November 13, 2015	Tooth & Nail Records	Mixer
2016	The Zolas	Swooner ("Swooner", "CV Dazzle", "Molotov Girls", "Fell In Love With New York", "Invisible", "Why Do I Wait"): Released: March 4, 2016	Light Organ Records	Mixer
2017	Fake Shark	Faux Real ("Heart 2 Heart", “NOFOMO”, “Cheap Thrills" and “Something Special"): Released: May 26, 2017	Light Organ Records	Producer Co-writer; Engineer; Mixer
2017	Yukon Blonde	Crazy (single): Released: July 28, 2017	Dine Alone Records	Producer Engineer; Mixer
2018	Dear Rouge	Phases ("Motion", "Flashes"): Released: March 9, 2018	Universal Music Canada	Producer Engineer; Mixer
