= Lotus Child =

Canadian indie rock band

Background information
- Origin: Vancouver, British Columbia, Canada
- Genres: Indie rock
- Years active: 2003–2009
- Members: Zachary Gray (2003–2008); Tom Dobrzanski (2003–2008); Miles Bruce (2006–2009); Peter Carruthers (2006–2009)
- Past members: Shaun Connery; Karl Von Beckmann; Bradley Dean
- Website: lotuschild.com

Lotus Child was a Canadian indie rock band formed in 2003 from Vancouver, British Columbia, Canada. The band members were notable figures in the Canadian music scene after the release of their second record Gossip Diet in 2006. Zachary Gray, the singer/guitarist and Tom Dobrzanski, the keyboardist/producer/singer were the founding members of Lotus Child, but the group's increased popularity came with the addition of Peter Carruthers on bass and Miles Bruce on drums.

== History ==
Zachary Gray and Tom Dobrzanski have been collaborating since they were teenagers in the British Columbia Boys' Choir. Gray and Dobrzanski were inspired by artists like Smashing Pumpkins, Jeff Buckley, Jason Priestley, and Muse. In 2003, Gray and Dobrazanski joined Shaun Connery, Karl Von Beckmann, and Bradley Dean and started performing in local Vancouver venues. They released their first record – a self-titled EP in 2004, and continued to play local sell-outs at venues such as: the Mesa Luna Nightclub, The Backstage Lounge, and The Media Club. Audience reaction was very positive, and Lotus Child became a popular part of the Vancouver indie scene that began to spread across Canada. Lotus Child had a rearranging of band members, and so with the addition of Carruthers and Bruce to the original duo the band began working on their second album.

== Gossip Diet ==
In 2006, they released Gossip Diet, which sold thousands of copies and garnered positive reviews. A Georgia Straight review stated that, "this intelligent, immaculately arranged, piano-infused alt-pop…befits a disc put out by a major label (or at least a decent-sized indie), so it's surprising that this is a self-released effort". A major contributor to this album was producer Howard Redekopp, who has worked with groups such as Tegan and Sara, The New Pornographers, and 54-40. This album was recorded in two Vancouver based studios: Warehouse Studio and Vertical Studios, and it features a blend of sing-along harmonies, piano interludes, and catchy guitar riffs.

Many of the tracks on Gossip Diet include politically charged lyrics, which Dobraznski explains is because the album is "about the gossip industry and their consumers manipulation of famous people for their own satisfaction… and it's a frustrated hissy-fit in reaction to government nepotism" (Mah, 2006). The album's single, "The Archaeologists" has an upbeat tempo that carries through the entire track; however the lyrics take on a more serious and political tone. Following the release of Gossip Diet, Lotus Child went on a busy Canada-wide tour that included openers for bands like Apostle of Hustle, Mother Mother, Memphis and events such as NXNE and Canadian Music Week.

== Band members ==
Zachary Gray and Tom Dobrzanski began their musical careers in the British Columbia Boys' Choir. Together they started writing simple guitar and piano songs, and recording them on Gray's father's 4-track player. Tom Dobrzanski has a degree in business and has studied audio engineering. Dobrzanski is the pianist and vocalist in Lotus Child. He is also a musical engineer, producer, composer, and multi-instrumentalist. Dobrzanski owns and manages Vertical Studios, where parts of Gossip Diet was recorded.

Lotus Child have opened for such Vancouver-based bands as Marianas Trench, Hey Ocean!, and The Painted Birds.

Gray and Dobrzanski are now part of the band The Zolas.

== Discography ==
=== Singles ===
- "Marlboro Friday" Lotus Child EP (2003)
- "Archaeologists" (2006)

=== EPs ===
- The Lotus Child EP (2003)

=== Albums ===
- Gossip Diet (2006)

== See also ==
- Music of Canada
- Music of Vancouver
- Canadian rock
- List of Canadian musicians
- List of bands from Canada
- List of bands from British Columbia
