= The Zolas =

Canadian indie rock band

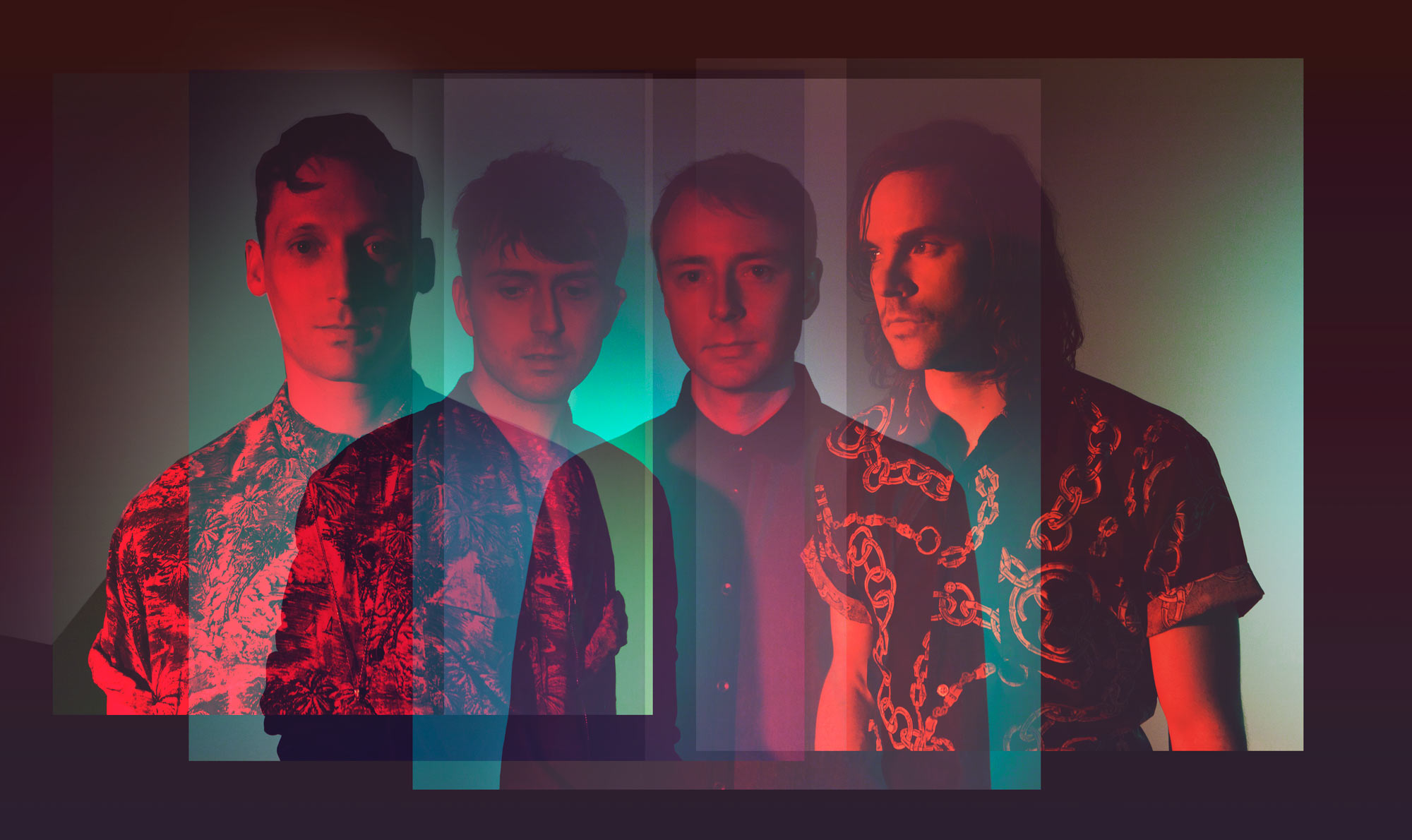
- The Zolas in 2016. From left to right: Zachary Gray, Dwight Abell, Tom Dobrzanski and Cody Hiles.

Background information
- Origin: Vancouver, British Columbia
- Genres: Indie rock, Alternative Rock
- Years active: 2009–present
- Labels: Light Organ Records
- Spinoff of: Lotus Child
- Members: Zachary Gray; Cody Hiles; Dwight Abell
- Past members: Tom Dobrzanski
- Website: thezolasmusic.com

The Zolas are a Canadian indie rock band based in Vancouver, signed to Light Organ Records. The band was formed by duo Zachary Gray (vocals/guitar) and Tom Dobrzanski (piano/keyboards/backing vocals), with various session musicians supporting them live and on record. The group has since expanded, adding Dwight Abell (bass/backing vocals) and Cody Hiles (drums/backing vocals) permanently to their lineup in 2015. In 2017, The Zolas received a Juno Award nomination for Group of the Year. Later that year, founding member Tom Dobrzanski left the band to spend time with his newborn child but is still occasionally involved with production. The trio were later joined by touring members Bronson Izzard (guitar) in 2019 and Elisa Kady Pangsaeng (samples, programming) in 2021.

== History ==
=== 2009–2011: Formation and Tic Toc Tic ===
Zachary Gray and Tom Dobrzanski were previously part of the band Lotus Child, from 2003 to 2008. Gray is the son of writer and composer John MacLachlan Gray.

The Zolas' debut album, Tic Toc Tic, was released in November 2009. The album was produced by Howard Redekopp, who has worked with The New Pornographers and Tegan and Sara. The album was recorded mostly in a studio Dobrzanski constructed in his parents' basement while he was studying at the University of British Columbia. Other Vancouver bands such as Said the Whale and Hey Ocean! have also recorded there. The song "The Great Collapse" has been in rotation on CBC Radio 3.

Five tracks from Tic Toc Tic have been heavily rotated on XM satellite radio station The Verge ("The Great Collapse", "You're Too Cool", "Body Ash", "No Talking", and "Marlaina Kamikaze"). Despite being a relative newcomer, The Zolas were the 4th-most heavily tracked band on the Verge for the first half of 2010. The Zolas were also nominated for Album of the Year at The Verge XM Awards in 2011.

=== 2012–2014: Ancient Mars ===
The Zolas' second album, Ancient Mars, was released on October 2, 2012. The duo's track "Knot in My Heart" from Ancient Mars was heard in the background on an episode of the television program Whitney on NBC on February 2, 2013. The song the album was named after, Ancient Mars, was written by vocalist and guitarist Zachary Gray while he was a student in the faculty of Commerce at the University of British Columbia. Gray revealed it was written at the University of British Columbia's Irving K. Barber Library during his time as a student when the Zolas headlined an event at Koerner's Pub at the University of British Columbia in March 2019.

=== 2015–2019: Swooner and Dobrzanski's departure ===
After touring with Ancient Mars, The Zolas began work on new material, releasing "Invisible" in 2013 as a standalone single. While working on material for a new full-length, Gray collaborated with Carly Rae Jepsen, writing the song "LA Hallucinations" from 2015's Emotion. On October 2, 2015, the band released its four-song EP, Wino Oracle EP, teasing three songs from their third studio album, as well as a B-side called "Island Life".

Gray and Dobrzanski united with new members Cody Hiles and Dwight Abell, and the Zolas began touring again during mid-2015. In January 2016, the band released a new single, "Swooner", to announce its third studio album of the same name, which was released on March 4, 2016.

In 2017, The Zolas received a Juno Award nomination for Group of the Year.

Later that year, founding member Tom Dobrzanski left the band to spend time with his newborn child but is still occasionally involved with production.

=== 2020: Z Days ===
On June 8, 2020, The Zolas announced they would release their fourth studio album later in the year following a promotion of singles, dubbed Z Days. The band would release one single a month at the end of the month until the end of summer 2020. The singles released from the album, in order of release, included "Energy Czar," "Come Back to Life," "Ultramarine," "Wreck Beach/Totem Park," and "I Feel the Transition."

=== 2021–present: Come Back To Life ===
On July 16, 2021, The Zolas released their fourth studio album, Come Back To Life. This was the first album to not feature founding member Tom Dobrzanski on piano/keyboards/backing vocals. The album was supported by the Come Back To Life Tour, which consisted of 11 shows across Canada and featured special guests Hotel Mira and Dwi. An 11 show US tour with Hotel Mira followed in 2022.

== Members ==
=== Current members ===
- Zachary Gray – Vocals, Guitar, Keyboards (occasional), Sampling, Programming (2009–present)
- Dwight Abell – Bass, Backing Vocals, Keyboards (occasional), Guitar (occasional) (2015–present, touring 2014–2015)
- Cody Hiles – Drums, Percussion, Backing Vocals (2015–present, touring 2013–2015)

=== Former Members ===
- Tom Dobrzanski – Piano, Keyboards, Backing Vocals (2009–2017)

=== Current Touring Members ===
- Bronson Izzard – Guitar (2019–present)
- Elisa Kady Pangsaeng – Sampling, Programming (2021–present)

=== Former Touring Members ===
- Henry Alcock-White – Bass (2013), Guitar (2014)
- James Younger – Bass, Backing Vocals (2014)
- Tom Heuckendorff – Piano, Keyboards (2017–2019)

== Discography ==
=== Albums ===
- Tic Toc Tic (2009)
- Ancient Mars (2012)
- Swooner (2016)
- Come Back to Life (2021)

=== EPs ===
- You're Too Cool (2009)
- Wino Oracle EP (2015)

=== Singles ===
Year	Song	Chart peak	Album
Year	Song	CAN Alt	Album
2011	"Cultured Man"	41	The Zolas/The Liptonians (split 7-inch)
2012	"Knot In My Heart"	26	Ancient Mars
2013	"Invisible"	20	Invisible E.P.
2015	"Molotov Girls"	18	Swooner
2016	"Get Dark"		Swooner
2016	"Swooner"	4	Swooner
2018	"Bombs Away"		Bombs Away
2018	"Handle With Care (song)"		Handle With Care
2020	"Energy Czar"		Come Back To Life
2020	"Come Back To Life"		Come Back To Life
2020	"Ultramarine"		Come Back To Life
2020	"Energy Czar (Mutilation Mix)"		Come Back To Life
2020	"Wreck Beach/Totem Park"		Come Back To Life
2020	"I Feel the Transition"		Come Back To Life
2021	"Another Dimension (feat. Cadence Weapon)"		Come Back To Life
2021	"Let It Scare You"		Come Back To Life
2021	"Yung Dicaprio"		Come Back To Life

== See also ==
- Music of Canada
- Music of Vancouver
- Canadian rock
- List of Canadian musicians
- List of bands from Canada
- List of bands from British Columbia
