= Capitol 6 =

Canadian rock band

- Origin: Vancouver, British Columbia, Canada
- Genres: Rock, Alternative rock, Indie rock
- Years active: 2011–2013
- Labels: Light Organ Records
- Members: Malcolm Jack; Matthew Krysko; Henry Beckwith; Jeff Mitchelmore; Dave Pullmer
- Website: www.capitol6.bandcamp.com

Capitol 6 was a rock band based in Vancouver, British Columbia, Canada.

== History ==
Capitol 6 were formed in Vancouver, British Columbia in 2011 and later that year released their first EP, Captain Rehab. In August that year, they released the "Fever/Henry's Opus" single as a free download on their Bandcamp page. Early members were guitarist and vocalist Malcolm Jack, bassist Matt Krysko, and keyboardist Henry Beckwith. By 2012, they were joined by guitarist Chris Alarcon and drummer Neil Corbett.

In 2012, Capitol 6 released their first full-length album, titled Pretty Lost. The album held eight tracks. They released their first single from the album, "Cold Ride", and included music videos for "Playing Dead" and "Just A Puzzle". "Just A Puzzle" was featured in the Canadian science fiction programme Continuum (in episode 4, entitled "Matter of Time").

In January 2013, they released another single, "No One Came", which featured a music video directed by David Biddle.

On 4 July 2013, Capitol 6 announced on their Facebook page that their final show was on 10 July.

== Discography ==
=== Studio albums ===
- Pretty Lost (12 June 2012)

=== EPs ===
- Captain Rehab (3 May 2011)
- Fever/Henry's Opus (9 August 2011)

=== Singles ===
- "No One Came" (5 January 2013)
