= Fan Death (band) =

American synth-pop band

- Origin: Brooklyn, New York, U.S.
- Genres: Synth-pop; nu-disco; Italo disco
- Years active: 2007–2011
- Labels: Pharmacy; Big Love, Phantasy Sounds; Last Gang
- Members: Szam Findlay; Kasia Elizabeth; Tessa Marie
- Past members: Dandilion Wind Opaine Schlase; Marta Jaciubek-McKeever

Fan Death was a synth-pop band formed in Brooklyn, New York City, in 2007 as a collaboration between producer Szam Findlay with vocalists Dandilion Wind Opaine (Dandi Wind) and Marta Jaciubek-McKeever. Findlay then moved to Vancouver, British Columbia, where the lineup changed to Findlay and sisters Kasia Elizabeth and Tessa Marie as vocalists. The band is named after the South Korean notion that suggests that sleeping in an enclosed room with an electric fan running can cause asphyxiation.

== Career ==
Influences on the band included OMD, the Human League and Alphaville.

In 2008, Erol Alkan remixed and released their debut single "Veronica's Veil" on his Phantasy Sounds label. The following year, Tokyo-based independent label Big Love Records released the EP Cannibal featuring remixes from CFCF and Manderson.

Fan Death played shows with Florence and the Machine, Ellie Goulding, Metronomy, Telepathe, Late of the Pier and Franz Ferdinand, as well as at the Afisha Picnic in Moscow. The band was featured in international magazines such as the NME, The Fader, Nylon, The Guardian, Dazed & Confused and on the cover of Italian fashion magazine Pig surrounded by naked men.

Also in 2009, Fan Death remixed songs by artists such as Ladyhawke, Frankmusik, The Virgins, Lindstrom, Lost Valentinos and Datarock. The band supported Vampire Weekend on the European leg of their world tour and released their album Womb of Dreams in the UK on August 30, 2010. Following this tour, the band dissolved. In August 2011, the official Fan Death website (defunct) announced the 2012 release of a new EP titled Awakenings, but it did not materialize.

== Discography ==
=== Studio albums ===
- Womb of Dreams (2010)

=== Extended plays ===
- Cannibal (2009)
- A Coin for the Well (2010)

=== Singles ===
- "Veronica's Veil" (2008)
- "Reunited" (2009)
