= Dandi Wind =

Canadian musical group

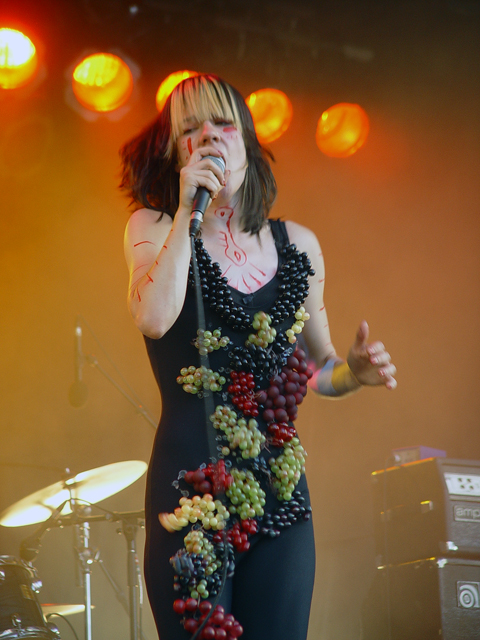

Background information
- Origin: Vancouver, British Columbia, Canada
- Genres: Post-industrial, electro-industrial, electropunk, electronica, experimental
- Years active: 2003–2009
- Labels: Summer Lovers Unlimited Music (Canada)
- Past members: Dandilion Wind Opaine; Szam Findlay; Evan Pierce
- Website: Official website

Dandi Wind was a post-industrial band created in Vancouver, British Columbia, Canada in 2003. The band consisted of duo Dandilion Wind Opaine and Szam Findlay. Dandi Wind released two albums, 2006's Concrete Igloo and 2008's Yolk of the Golden Egg in addition to several EPs and singles. Dandi Wind disbanded in 2009, as Opaine and Findlay formed the disco band Fan Death along with Marta Jaciubek-McKeever.

== History ==
Dandilion Wind Opaine was raised by hippie parents in a cabin near Smithers, a small town in northern British Columbia, where there was no running water and vegetables were grown in greenhouses. Opaine's father was a sculptor and her mother was an archivist. Moving to Vancouver at age 12, Opaine met Szam Findlay in high school. Opaine began attending Emily Carr University of Art and Design in 2000, where she studied sculpture, but dropped out of school. Opaine and Findlay formed Dandi Wind in late 2003 and by 2005 the band was based in Montreal. By 2007, Evan Pierce had joined the band as a drummer. Throughout Opaine's musical career she designed her own clothes and did her own styling, often wearing homemade costumes during concerts. Findlay wrote the music for Dandi Wind, with Opaine providing vocals.

Dandi Wind's sound and style was influenced by avant-garde and electronic music artists of the 1980s, including Nina Hagen, Lene Lovich, Einstürzende Neubauten, Kate Bush, Hazel O'Connor, Skinny Puppy, and Ministry.

In October 2004, Dandi Wind toured in England, performing concerts in Liverpool, Nottingham, Birmingham, Leeds, Manchester, and London. In January 2005, the band conducted a European tour.

In 2008, Dandi Wind was one of the first foreign acts that Split Works toured in China, performing concerts in Wuhan, Xi'an, Beijing, and Chengdu. The band was scheduled to play at Shanghai's Shelter Club, but the concert was cancelled "due to the heightened sensitivities around live music in Shanghai at the moment." Local Chinese media speculated that the cancellation was due to improper licensing. The cancellation came shortly after China's Ministry of Culture tightened controls on foreign artists due to the Icelandic singer Björk's expression of support for Tibetan independence at a Shanghai concert. While playing at a venue in Taiwan, Opaine was electrocuted after an audience member threw a drink at a malfunctioning microphone. Opaine described the electric shock as "the strongest pain I've ever felt" but finished her performance, and was later hospitalized after becoming ill.

=== Influence ===
Dandi Wind was featured in a variety of magazines and media outlets, including Supersweet Magazine, NME, Dazed & Confused, Exclaim!, Nightlife Magazine, The Nerve, Discorder Magazine, The Georgia Straight, and Trash Menagerie.

The Canadian synth-pop musician Grimes has listed Dandi Wind as one of her idols/influences, describing Opaine as someone who "never got that famous, but...should be famous." Dandi Wind was an early influence, as Grimes began attending Dandi Wind's live shows when she was in high school.

Daniel Sylvester of A.Side TV described Dandi Wind as "legendary hometown heroes" with "imagination and charm...who just couldn't get their names past the city limits"; despite being a "wildly popular" cult act in Vancouver and releasing "two terrific albums", the band "never did find a proper audience".

Late of the Pier's song "Whitesnake" was influenced by Dandi Wind.

== Discography ==
=== Studio albums ===
- Concrete Igloo (2006) - (Summer Lovers Unlimited Music)
- Yolk of the Golden Egg (2008) - (Summer Lovers Unlimited Music)

=== Extended plays ===
- Bait the Traps (2005) - (Bongo Beat)
- Break The Bone And Suck The Marrow From It (2005) - (Summer Lovers Unlimited Music)
- Nofuncity (2006) - (Noize! Records)
- A Smile Before Death (2007) - (Todtentschlaf)

=== Singles ===
- "Apotemnophilia" / "Adolescent" (2007) - (Alt Del – UK)
- "Sleeping Beauty" / "Belly Cutting" (2007) - (Every Conversation)
- "Decontaminate" (2008) - (Black Mountain Music)

• Dead Gods, Dandi Wind - Split (B-side: Incubation) (2009)

== See also ==
- Fan Death
