= Fur Trade (band) =

Canadian musical group

- Genre: indie rock
- Label: Last Gang Records
- Members: Steve Bays; Parker Bossley

Fur Trade is a Canadian indie rock band, consisting of Steve Bays and Parker Bossley of Hot Hot Heat. The band has released one album, Don't Get Heavy.

== History ==
Fur Trade was formed while Hot Hot Heat was in hiatus. The pair began recording in Bays' studio and released the album Don't Get Heavy on Last Gang Records in 2013. The album builds on 1970s "yacht rock"; it includes a variety of styles elements, from funk to pop and synth, and features songs written by both men. Reviews of the album were mixed.

Their video for "Same Temptation", directed by Kheaven Lewandowski, was a shortlisted nominee for the 2015 Prism Prize.
