= Mounties (band) =

Canadian indie rock band

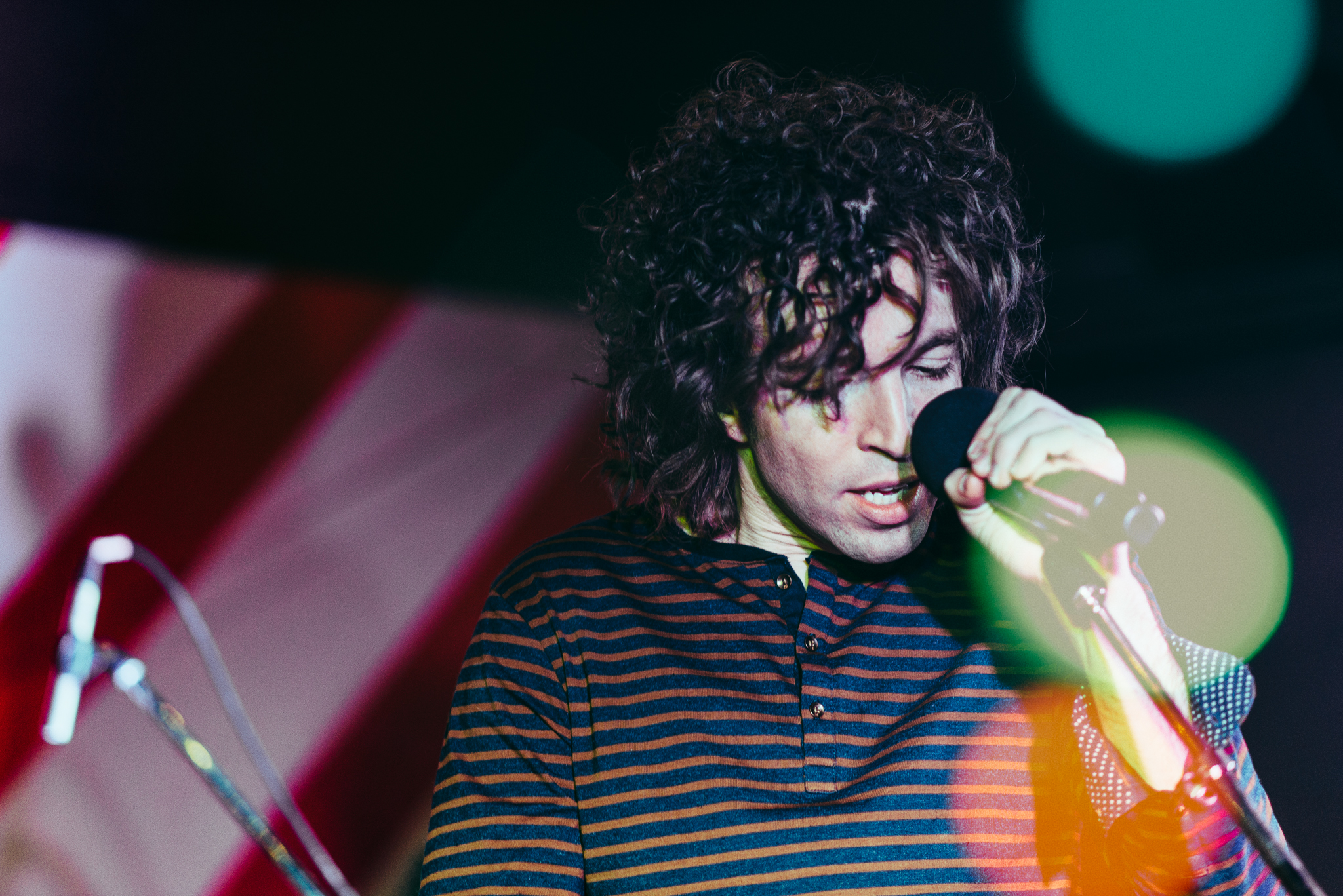
- Mounties performing in 2016

Background information
- Origin: Toronto, Canada
- Genre: Indie rock
- Years active: 2013–present
- Label: Light Organ
- Members: Hawksley Workman; Steve Bays; Ryan Dahle

Mounties are a Canadian indie rock supergroup consisting of singer-songwriter Hawksley Workman, Steve Bays of Hot Hot Heat, and Ryan Dahle of the Age of Electric/Limblifter.

== History ==
Workman, Bays, and Dahle first discussed the possibility of a collaboration while socializing during the 2009 Juno Awards. They began jamming and writing songs together in 2012, and the trio released its debut single, "Headphones", in January 2013. The song's video consists of a clip from the 1980s Canadian children's television series Téléfrançais.

Their debut full-length album, Thrash Rock Legacy, was released on March 4, 2014, on Light Organ Records. Soon after, Mounties performed at Commodore Ballroom in Vancouver.

An eclectic mix of pop, rock, and electronica, Thrash Rock Legacy was a longlisted nominee for the 2014 Polaris Music Prize. The group was named SIRIUSXM Emerging Artist of the Year at the 2014 SIRIUSXM Indie Awards.

In March 2018, they released a new single called "Burning Money". It was followed in February 2019 by their second album, Heavy Meta.

== Band members ==
- Hawksley Workman
- Steve Bays
- Ryan Dahle

== Discography ==
Studio albums

- Thrash Rock Legacy (2014)
- Heavy Meta (2019)

Singles

- "Headphones"
- "Burning Money"
- "Canoe Song”
- "De-Evolve Again”
