= Light Organ Records =

Canadian independent record label

- Founded: 2010
- Distributor: Sony Music Canada
- Genre: indie rock
- Country of origin: Canada
- Location: Vancouver, British Columbia
- Official website: http://lightorganrecords.com/

Light Organ Records is a Canadian independent record label, based in Vancouver, British Columbia.

The label was launched in 2010 by Jonathan Simkin to distribute records by indie rock and college radio bands, after he found such bands difficult to market on his existing mainstream rock label 604 Records.

Artists currently signed to Light Organ include The Zolas, Louise Burns, The Fugitives, Fake Shark, Hotel Mira, Adaline, Sun Wizard, and Mounties.
