= Adaline (musician) =

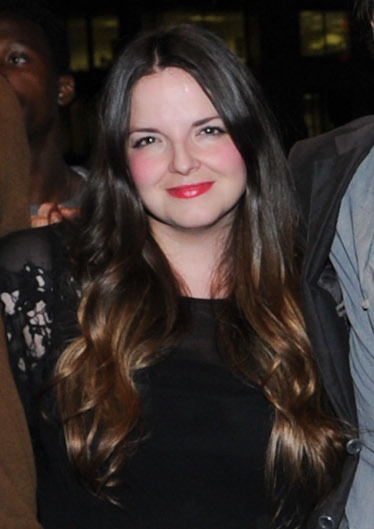

Background information
- Born: October 23, 1988 (age 38)
- Origin: Ottawa, Ontario, Canada
- Genres: alternative, pop, alternative pop
- Years active: 2008–present
- Label: Cadence Music (Canada)
- Website: adalinemusic.com

Adaline, born Shawna Beesley, is an alternative-pop Canadian singer-songwriter from Ottawa, Ontario. Many of her songs have been licensed for multiple television shows including Grey's Anatomy, 90210, Ringer, Lost Girl, and Wynonna Earp.

== Early life ==
Early in her career, Adaline had a moment of international recognition in 2009 when she met Robert Pattinson at a Juno party and tweeted about their encounter. An unnamed source found her tweet and linked to it, saying Rob Pattinson was sighted with Canadian musician Adaline and posted a link to her website. In less than 24 hours, Twilight fans from all over the world were reposting her on social media and thousands of people downloaded her music.

== Career ==
Adaline's sophomore release Modern Romantics was nominated for "Pop Recording of the Year" at the 2012 Western Canadian Music Awards.

Adaline's music video for the first single of her sophomore album The Noise premiered on Interview Magazine, receiving over 100,000 views in its first week online and was charted in the Top 20.

In 2013, Adaline was invited to do a 10-month composer residency at Norman Jewison's Canadian Film Centre.

She has collaborated with many artists on their own projects including Buck 65, Fake Shark Real Zombie, and Adult Karate.

In 2015, Adaline covered Genesis' song "Follow You Follow Me", which is featured in the very successful Cineplex animated short film Lily and the Snowman. A spin off of the film made headlines in the UK when a young student fooled the internet into thinking his holiday film was a real John Lewis holiday ad. Adaline's cover is used in the student film.

Adaline contributed to the score of the Bret Easton Ellis written film The Canyons, starring Lindsay Lohan. She co-wrote three songs on the soundtrack with Brendan Canning of Broken Social Scene.

Adaline's song "Keep Me High" is featured in both the film and trailer for Below Her Mouth, starring Erika Linder, which premiered at the Toronto International Film Festival in 2016 and came out in theatres in the US in April 2017.

Adaline's song "Ghost" is also featured in a groundbreaking scene in the episode "Friends In Low Places" of the popular Syfy show Wynonna Earp. The episode received positive reactions from fans, as they considered the scene "Ghost" is featured in as having an accurate and positive representation of a LGBT+ love-making scene.
