= Music of Vancouver =

Vancouver, British Columbia, is one of Canada's largest cities and foremost cultural centers.

== History ==
Music has been an integral part of Vancouver's First Nations for thousands of years however it is not clearly documented when it flourished.

European arrivals in the nineteenth century established numerous amateur orchestras, ensembles, churches, and ethnocentric choirs. By the 1920s there existed local choral societies and orchestras that regularly presented the major works of European composers to Vancouverites.

The first known musical entertainments (other than those provided by First Nations residents, and informally by mill workers, sailors, loggers, and tavern keepers), in what would later become Vancouver, were Methodist church services led by a Mrs. Sullivan in Gastown, who was of West Indian origin. Her son Arthur became popular with Vancouver impresarios as a Master of Ceremonies and his career as a singer, actor and host bridged the pre-railway Gastown era with the glitter of Vancouver's nightlife in the '20s and '30s.

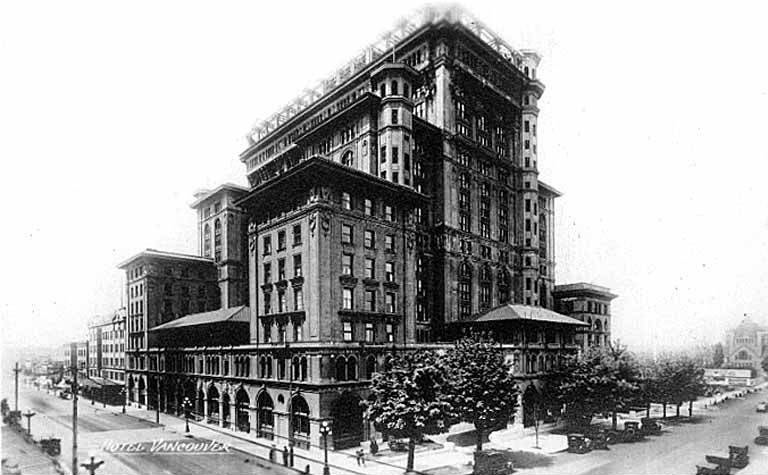
The second iteration of Hotel Vancouver, c. 1923. The hotel featured an Egyptian Art Deco-styled opera house. The opera house was later demolished in the 1970s.

The city has had a sometimes vibrant musical culture since the days it was on the worldwide circuit known as "Grand Tour", which included clubs in centers such as New York, London, Paris, Rome, Shanghai, Cairo, Sydney, San Francisco and even Dawson City. Artists such as Enrico Caruso and Anna Pavlova trod the boards in Vancouver. The city regularly feted musical notables, since the Canadian Pacific Railway terminus was on the main route from London, UK to the Orient. Attached to the Canadian Pacific's Hotel Vancouver (demolished) second Hotel Vancouver (now the location of the Toronto-Dominion Tower on Georgia Street) was an opera house in neo-Egyptian Art Deco styling fronting on Granville Street. When this theatre closed and was demolished to make way for the new Pacific Centre in the early 1970s it was known as the Lyric Theatre, but originally known as Orpheum Theatre. The current Orpheum is a restored vaudeville house a block farther down Granville, which houses one of the last large Wurlitzer theatre organs installed back in the silent movie era.

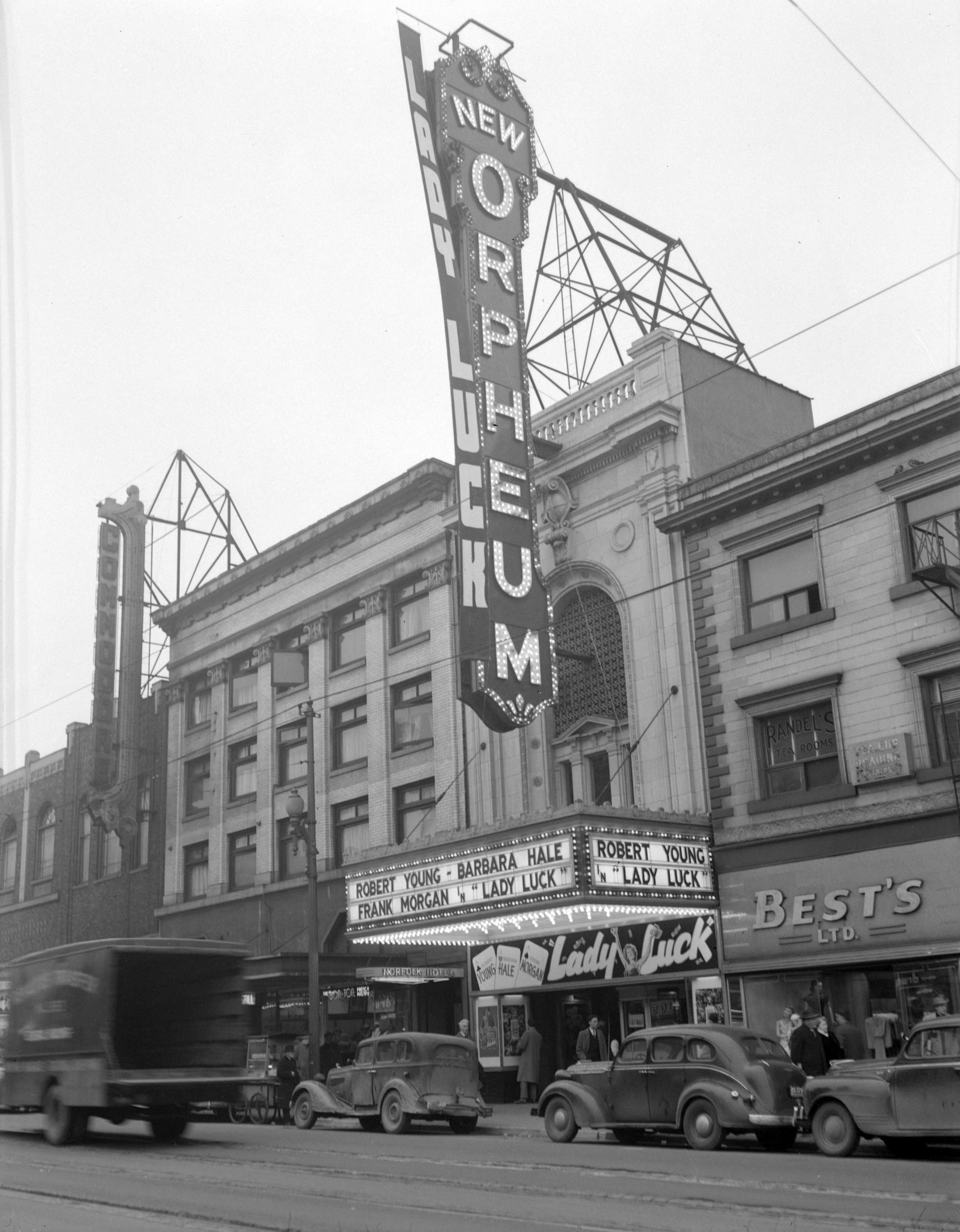
The Orpheum theatre with advertising for the movie Lady Luck, c. 1946. The theatre was home to the city's first resident orchestra.

The Lyric (the original Orpheum) was home to the city's first resident orchestra. When the Vancouver Symphony Orchestra (VSO) was founded, it performed in the Capitol Theatre). The city also had several professional and amateur musical theatre companies. In the 1920s, the "Lyric" premiered Atlantis, a lavish original musical styled on British auteurs Gilbert and Sullivan. It anticipated a world tour, but got mixed reviews. Other theatres with stages for live theatre, opera and music were the Vogue (still standing), the Strand, the Coronet (all movie theatres in their last days, the Strand opposite Hudson's Bay Company across Georgia, the Coronet opposite Hudson's Bay Company across Granville). Two now vanished opera houses stood on Pender Street, one near Howe Street, the other at what is now Carrall and Pender (then named Dupont Street). The now-derelict stretch of Hastings Street between Main and Cambie was known as "the Great White Way" because of its many theatres, restaurants and bright neon decor. It was home to the Beacon and Lux theatres and the original cinema of the continent-wide Pantages chain. (The Pantages family founded the city's annual Polar Bear Swim at English Bay.)

The first movie theatre was the tiny Savoy (1902) on Cordova Street (approximately where the Telecom building meets the newly rebuilt Woodwards garage). That location in the 1890s and early '00s was the city's main social and shopping promenade. The Lyric and the greatly expanded Hotel Vancouver, the second by that name, were intended by the CPR's property division to attract commercial life up out of the older part of the city. As a result, restaurants, stores and other theatres quickly opened in the same area, giving birth to the strip once known as "Theatre Row", is now prosaically retitled the Granville Entertainment District, also known as Granville Mall. Its southern three blocks, known as "theatre Row" with the Lyric, Strand and Coronet theatres, extended to Dunsmuir Street. Other stages and movie theatres typically were found in each of the city's local commercial areas – the Park, Stanley, Hollywood, Rio, York, Dunbar and others. An important stage for musical theatre, the Malkin Bowl in Stanley Park, was built by the Malkin family, who made their fortune in wholesale groceries. Malkin Bowl's resident company, Theatre Under the Stars (often called TUTS), was a popular, critical success for many years (rain and fog permitting). Its successor in the 1970s was the less-successful Theatre in the Park. Subsequently, a revamped and improved company adopted the "Theatre Under The Stars" as its name.

Complementing mainstream entertainment and high art, it follows naturally that a city that began life as a nearly all-male seaport, fishing, and lumbering town would have a tradition of burlesque, and also of popular music. No doubt musical entertainments were to be had in the old bordellos of the pre-railway days, as also in private gentlemen's clubs, but those artists apart from erstwhile singer-actress Lulu Sweet (the namesake of Lulu Island (the City of Richmond) and purported mistress of a former Mayor of Vancouver). Folk music in general went unrecorded in western Canada until the work of Vancouver folklorist Philip J. Thomas, who first published Songs of the Pacific Northwest in 1979.

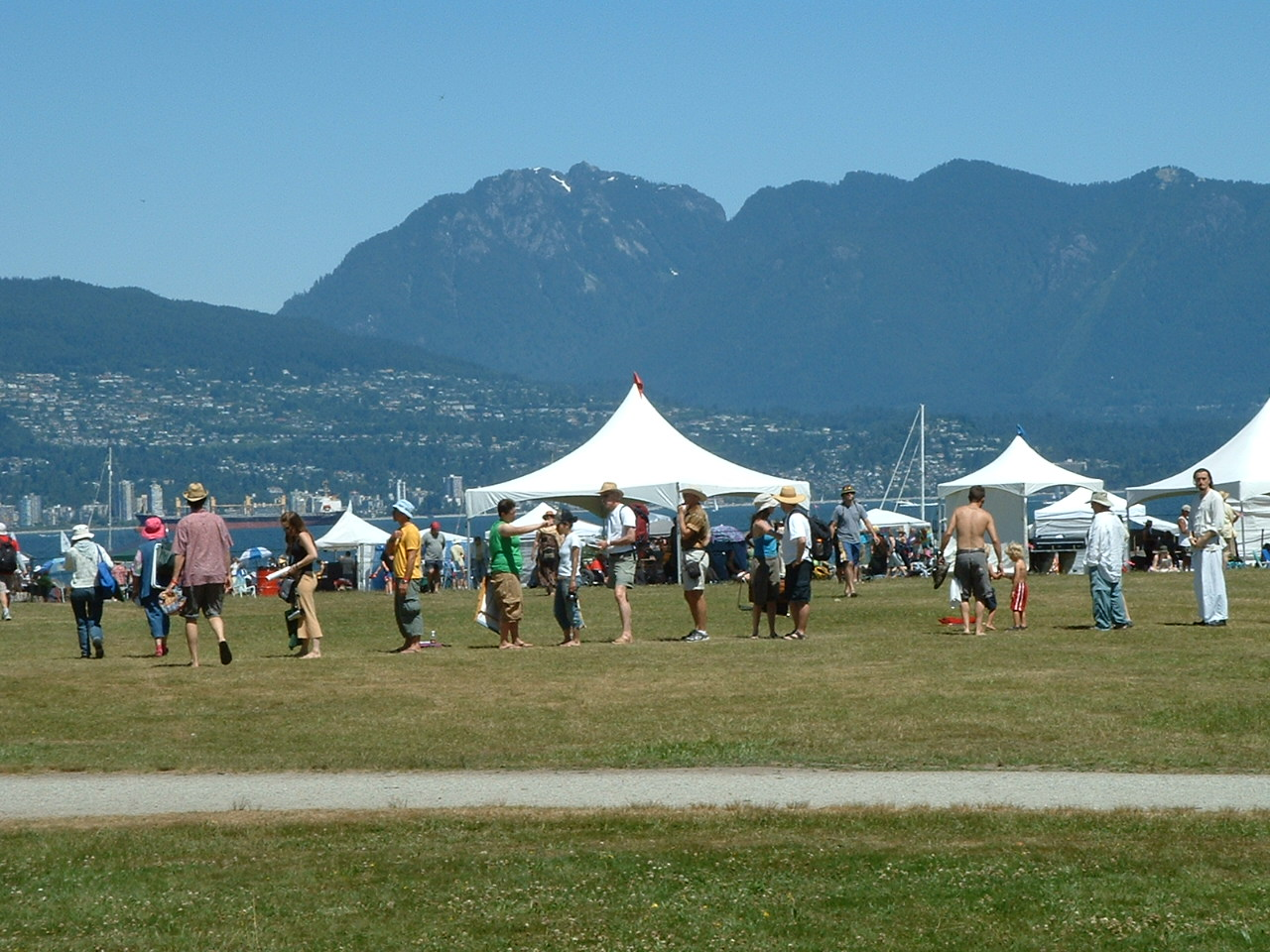
Folk and world music remains popular in Vancouver, with the city hosting the annual Vancouver Folk Music Festival at Jericho Beach.

Throughout Vancouver's history, Chinatown was the site of Chinese opera and other traditional Chinese music; Chinese benevolent organizations had their own private orchestras. In "Little Yokohama", aka Japantown, Japanese musical and theatrical arts were practiced and performed. Other ethnic communities formed their own musical groups: the Sons of Norway choirs, the Vancouver Welsh Choir, and folk-dance troupes of all backgrounds (but notably Ukrainian). In some areas such as West Broadway's Greektown or Commercial Drive's old Italian-Portuguese days, ethnic dinner restaurants often had orchestras. Most of Vancouver's many ethnic community present popular and classical entertainers from their home countries. Cantopop and Bhangra very popular. Scottish bagpipe bands are very much a part of local culture. Indeed, many pipers are from non-Scots backgrounds: from Ukrainians to the Chinese. In later years, the Irish folk-pop band the Irish Rovers established the first in their onetime worldwide chain of Irish pubs in Vancouver, partly because of the popularity of that style of music in the city (still to be found today at the Gastown pubs the Irish Heather, the Blarney Stone and elsewhere). World musics remain popular in Vancouver today, and are part of both the highly successful annual Vancouver Folk Music Festival at Jericho Beach and the Commercial Drive countercultural/alternative district. Recently, Gandharva Loka World Music Instruments opened a store on Granville Island, with music and instruments from around the world.

Jazz music came to Vancouver relatively early, in part because of the role of the city as a residence or turnaround for the typically African American/Canadian customer service employees of the railways (porters, stewards, waiters, cooks, trainmen). Another factor was the "Grand Tour" which brought Jazz celebres through Vancouver while en route to somewhere else. A shantytown on Union and Prior Streets east of Main, known as Hogan's Alley after one its first black residents, became home to illicit music clubs, often harassed and shut down by the police. Despite its slum reputation, the neighbourhood was home to superb "session players", but it was not until later years that black musicians were allowed to play in the house bands of the city's mainstream dinner clubs. Over the years the city became home to a strong community of blues, funk and soul performers, and is known for being home to blues singer the late Long John Baldry. The city's blues scene also is home for other blues notables such as Koko Taylor, Jim Byrnes, Jerry Doucette, and Randy Bachman and funk/soul singers Lovena Fox, Theda Marie and others.

It is noteworthy that neither the Vancouver Symphony Orchestra nor the Vancouver Opera have ever had music directors who were Canadian-born or female, whereas the Vancouver Cantata Singers and the Vancouver Chamber choir have been led by locally-born musicians.

=== Popular music ===
==== 1960s ====
Vancouver pop music developed its own "sound" in the late 1960s. From the folk music played in the coffee houses of Kitsilano's 4th Avenue, people would come to see hippies wandering – and hear acoustic music- filling the street. Another major venue was "The Retinal Circus" on Davie St. where famous and infamous "psychedelic " rock bands played regularly. The "West Coast Sound" grew from a fusion of hard rocking music mixed with wailing guitars and visual light shows. Vancouver was a place to be 'in the music' which shaped the youth of the day. Noted bands abounded: The Poppy Family, The Collectors later Chilliwack which had the major hit "Crazy Talk," In Vancouver's psychedelic movement there flourished High-Flying Bird, United Empire Loyalists, My Indole Ring, Black Snake Blues Band, Mother Tucker's Yellow Duck, Painted Ship, Mock Duck, Papa Bear's Medicine Show, Hydro Electric Streetcar, Seeds of Time and Spring. The "Rhythm and Blues" scene in the '60s included The Nighttrain Review, Jason Hoover and the Epics, Bobby Taylor & the Vancouvers featuring Tommy Chong on guitar. The Vancouvers were signed to Motown by Berry Gordy and had a #5 hit on the U.S. R&B charts with "Does Your Mama Know About Me?", written by Chong. Bobby Taylor's "King of Clubs" was home to "The Coasters" and other great R&B bands. Vancouver had it all, Eric Burton and the Animals, Long John Baldry, The Doors and several other southern bands came to play in the very creative milieu created by the Vancouver Rockers of the '60s and early '70s. Several recording studios, notably Mushroom Records and Little Mountain Sound Studios, recorded and produced many great record albums. In the mid 70's Heart went on to international stardom with hits such as "Crazy On You," "Dreamboat Annie" and "Barracuda."

==== 1970s ====
Such superstars as the Beatles (who first played in Vancouver in 1964), the Rolling Stones (who opened their infamous 1972 tour at the then-brand new Pacific Coliseum) and Elvis Presley performed at the outdoor Empire Stadium, partly to keep the "undesirable element" associated with rock'n'roll out of the city core but also because of the expectedly large number of attendees. Canadian rock band Bachman–Turner Overdrive, which had a #1 hit on the Billboard Hot 100 with "You Ain't Seen Nothin' Yet" in 1974, made Vancouver their second home. Lead singer and guitarist Randy Bachman still lives on Saltspring Island) while the Poppy Family began and ended their career in Vancouver. Certain touring British and American bands (Led Zeppelin, Pink Floyd, Yes, Alice Cooper) developed avid local followings. Some non-Vancouver bands such as Heart, Van Halen, Mötley Crüe and Bon Jovi, resided and recorded in Vancouver regularly. Singer-poet Joni Mitchell continues to maintain a residence in Pender Harbour on the Sunshine Coast. One-time Georgia Straight music critic Bob Geldof went on to form the new wave band The Boomtown Rats.

The 1970s brought bands such as Sweeney Todd, which featured Nick Gilder, who would go on to enjoy solo success with his Billboard Hot 100 #1 song "Hot Child In The City" from 1978, Loverboy, Nicky Chug Company, Winter's Green, Trooper, The Hometown Band, Holy Smoke and Prism to the scene. Many of these acts began their lives as cover bands and played high school dances, before hitting the big time. Folk music also began to develop and performers such as Valdy, Smiling Jack Smith and Pied Pumkin were regulars at folk festivals like the Easter Be-in held in Stanley Park and coffee houses.

Later in the 1970s, at the dawn of the punk era, Vancouver played a central role in the development punk music as many of the local musicians had exposure to the London scene. Vancouver punk bands had (as usual with Vancouver performers) wider followings and more fame in the UK, Europe and the United States than at home. These included D.O.A. and lead singer Joey Shithead, The Subhumans, the K-Tels (who were forced by the TV-marketing company to change their name, which became the Young Canadians), I, Braineater, Active Dog, the Modernettes, the Pointed Sticks, Secret V's, DayGlo Abortions, and U-J3RK5 (pron. "You-Jerk", as the five is silent).

==== 1980s ====
Vancouver musician Bryan Adams started his professional career at 15, singing for Sweeney Todd in the 70's. He would go on to become an international solo recording artist in the 80's. His albums Cuts Like a Knife and Reckless sold millions of copies worldwide. Bryan Adams had 4 #1 Billboard Hot 100 hits including the soft rock "(Everything I Do) I Do It For You" in 1991. He has won 18 Juno Awards and 1 Grammy Award. Adams also was hugely successful as part of a songwriting duo with fellow Vancouver musician Jim Vallance. Together they wrote songs for some the music industries biggest names: Rod Stewart, Joe Cocker, Tina Turner, Carly Simon. A band called Elbowed Out performed at a place in New Westminster called the Answer II, they performed in many Canadian cities from Vancouver to Montreal.

Jim Vallance would continue on as a music industry "Song Doctor". He would assist artists in cowriting songs. His list of clients include: Aerosmith, Alice Cooper, Ozzy Osbourne, Rick Springfield, Anne Murray. Vallance has the Juno Award for Composer of the Year 4 times.

Producer Bruce Fairbairn would also become prominent during the 80s. He was initially a member turned producer for Vancouver rock band Prism. After producing their first 4 albums in the 70s to moderate success, Fairbairn then worked with other Vancouver bands, such as Loverboy and Strange Advance. His biggest success came when he produced Bon Jovi's Slippery When Wet. Fairbairn would continue to produce top artists such as Aerosmith, AC/DC, Van Halen, INXS, Yes.

Local bands Spirit of the West, The Nervous Fellas, 54-40, Slow, Images in Vogue, Strange Advance, Skinny Puppy, Sons of Freedom and The Scramblers were prominent in the 80s also. Skinny Puppy and, later, Front Line Assembly and Numb would become hugely influential on the industrial dance and goth scenes, both within and outside Vancouver. Singer Songwriter Shari Ulrich joined Joe Mock and Rick Scott in Pied Punkin, then later joined Roy Forbes and Bill Henderson (Chilliwack) in UHF. She also made her mark as a Juno Award-winning solo artist after the demise of The Hometown Band.

Influential extreme metal band Blasphemy formed in Vancouver in 1984.

On the alternative side, Nomeansno, Animal Slaves, Art Bergman and many others... very well documented on Last Call – Vancouver Independent Music (Zulu Records), a compilation of 48 bands active at that time.

Since the 1980s, when large wave of Chinese immigration swept the region, Vancouver has since been known as a generator of canto-pop stars and other Cantonese actors. Nicholas Tse, Edison Chen, Jade Kwan, Sally Yeh, Joyce Cheng, were all just a few of the current canto-pop stars that were raised there.

==== 1990s ====
In the 90s, the proximity to Seattle's grunge scene spurred the popularity of bands like Maow, the Riff Randells, Cub, Gob, The Smugglers, Nardwuar the Human Serviette and his band The Evaporators, the New town Animals, and Thee Goblins which all happen to be on the same label, Mint Records. Moderate commercial success came to power-pop bands such as Age of Electric, Superconductor, Limblifter, Econoline Crush and Matthew Good. Other notable Vancouver residents (and sometimes Vancouver residents) include Grapes of Wrath, Odds, Art Bergmann, Spirit of The West, Moist, Sarah McLachlan, and Rose Chronicles.

As grunge faded back into obscurity, Vancouver held on to a vibrant scene of its own. d.b.s, MCRACKINS, Utopia, Seamen, SNFU, D.O.A., BNU, Wisecrack, Kid Icarus, Another Joe, Superchief, Submission Hold, etc.

Despite the commercialization of grunge, Vancouver maintained an enterprising independent scene. Strain, Plains of Abraham, Reserve34, Shift, Burden, Self-Esteem Project, By a Thread, The Red Light Sting, Sparkmarker, Target, Closed Caption Radio, All State Champion, Black Rice, Operation Makeout, The Dirtmitts, Dissent, Witness Protection Program, the Attack, End This Week With Knives, A Javelin Reign, Goat's Blood, Blue Monday, The Black Halos and 3 Inches of Blood.

One notable heavy musician from Vancouver is Devin Townsend, who gained international recognition and critical success with his band Strapping Young Lad and self-titled progressive side projects, primarily The Devin Townsend Band. Townsend, of New Westminster, is a central figure in the Vancouver heavy music scene, and has worked with influential Vancouver acts such as Front Line Assembly, in addition to producing the albums of numerous local bands though HevyDevy Studios.

Vancouver has always featured acts that don't fit any one particular musical slot. The 1990s were no different. Such as: Daytona, Bob's Your Uncle, Big Tall Garden, Coal, 2 Left Feet, Shine, Rymes with Orange, Circle C, Sarcastic Mannequins, Custer's Last Bandstand, Catherine Wheel, Juice Monkeys, The Wingnuts, Dear God, and Pull offered an eclectic element to the local scene. Many of which received airplay on COAST 800 / 1040 AM from 1990 to 1993.

The 1990s also sparked a Vancouver electronic dance music scene with the creation of a radio station called Z95.3 FM. The station heavily promoted Vancouver's dance/pop music, discovering various artists and bands such as Son Dexter, Thomas Donovan, Soul Decision, Red Sector One, and The West End Girls.

==== 2000s and 2010s ====
Vancouver continues to have a strong music scene.

A sample of Vancouver's independent music scene includes or included: Grimes, The New Pornographers, The Zolas, You Say Party, In Medias Res, Fake Shark – Real Zombie!, Marianas Trench, Big John Bates, Destroyer, Black Mountain, Mother Mother, Dan Mangan, Hey Ocean!, The Pack A.D., Japandroids, White Lung, Veda Hille, S.T.R.E.E.T.S, Ladyhawk, Dandi Wind, Fan Death, Bend Sinister, Kill Matilda, Apollo Ghosts, Blood Meridian, Rat Silo, The B-Lines, Culture Def, e.s.l., 29 East, Drawn Ship, Rococode, Art Kenyon, Hannah Epperson, Stef Lang, Hannah Georgas, This Side of Town, Sprïng, Synthcake, The Greenbelt Collective, On Holiday, Young and Sexy, Los Furios, Tough Age, Fighting for Ithaca, The Brass Action, Kung Fu Symphony, Fond of Tigers, The Psychic Alliance, Parlour Steps, Capitol 6, Rampant Lion, Lightning Dust, Cinderpop, The Orchid Highway, CR Avery, Ford Pier, Petroleum By-Product, The Doers, Run Chico Run, Young Liars, Said the Whale, Secret Mommy, Twin Crystals, Supermoon, and the Organ.

Vancouver's hip-hop scene includes: Powfu, bbno$, SonReal, Tommy Genesis, LNDN DRGS, Snak the Ripper, Snotty Nose Rez Kids, Manila Grey, Boslen, Chin Injeti, Kid Koala, Threat From Outer Space, Swollen Members, Rascalz, Josh Martinez, Sweatshop Union, Social Deviantz, DJ Moves, Checkmate, Extra Terrestrial, No Luck Club, BZ Jam, Merkules, Birdapres and Moka Only.

There are Industrial and EDM bands: Delerium, Animal Bodies, Decree, Noize Tribe Zero, Left Spine Down, Go Ghetto Tiger, Sex With Strangers, Combine The Victorious, Noise Unit, Stiff Valentine, OHM, Felix Cartal and Landscape Body Machine.

In the world music arena, artists include: Ivan Tucakov and Tambura Rasa, Alpha Yaya Diallo, and Delhi To Dublin.

Pop music artist Carly Rae Jepsen is based out of Vancouver. She had a #1 Billboard Hot 100 hit with the dance-pop "Call Me Maybe" in 2012. Pop rock singer Daniel Powter had a #1 Hot 100 hit with "Bad Day" in 2006. This was the Billboard Year-End #1 single of 2006. Michael Bublé has had 3 #1 albums on the Billboard 200 like the jazz and traditional pop Crazy Love in 2009.

Source: List of Billboard Hot 100 number-ones by Canadian artists

== Active music performance venues ==
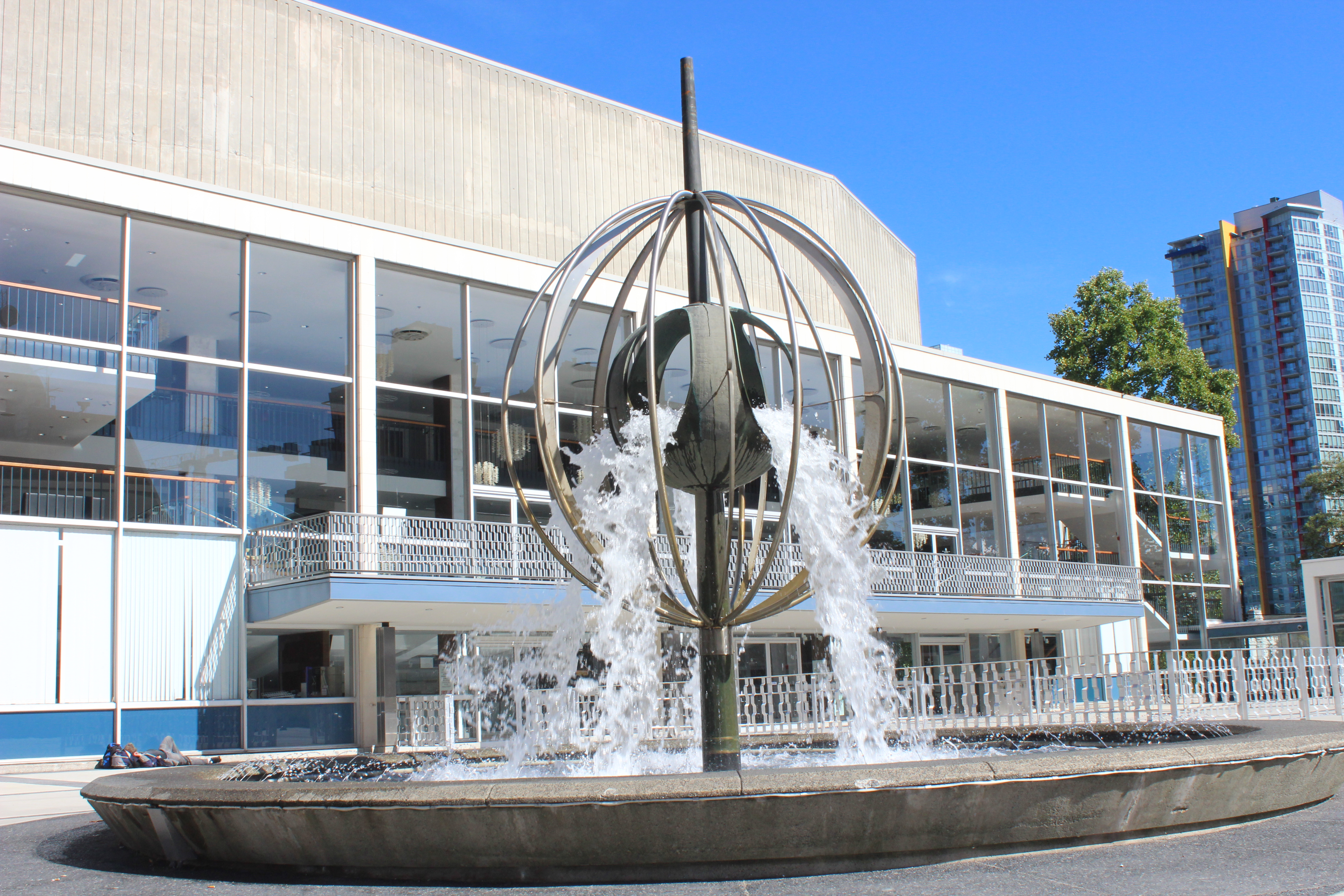
Opened in 1959, the Queen Elizabeth Theatre is a performing arts centre, and is presently home to the Vancouver Opera and Ballet BC.

The largest of these are the Orpheum Theatre, the Chan Centre for the Performing Arts, the Queen Elizabeth Theatre. Smaller venues include the concert hall of the University of British Columbia School of Music, the Vogue Theatre the Cultural Centre, the Italian Cultural Centre, two theatres of the Kay Meek Centre for the Performing Arts adjoining West Vancouver Secondary School, the Vancouver Academy of Music's auditorium, the Vancouver East Cultural Centre, Burnaby's Shadbolt Centre and the Michael Fox Theatre in Burnaby South Secondary School. Of the city's churches, Pacific Spirit United, St. Andrews-Wesley United, St. James' Anglican, and Christ Church Cathedral (Vancouver) frequently serve as concert venues.

Bars that regularly host live music include The Railway Club, The Lamplighter, The Media Club, The Red Room, the Bourbon, Anza Club, The Astoria, The Biltmore, Pub 340, Venue (formerly the Plaza), the Rickshaw Theatre, Pat's Pub and the Admiral Pub. Vancouver's notoriously strict licensing policies and the more recent tendency to convert increasingly valuable real estate into condominiums caused the closing of many bars or venues presenting live music: the Cobalt, The Sugar Refinery, the Mesa Luna, the Starfish Room and Richard's on Richards and The Waldorf Hotel. These factors have also created an illegal underground venue scene which is regularly at odds with City Hall and the police. DIY venues include Red Gate Arts Society, 648 Kingsway, and formerly the Grey Lab and Smilin’ Buddha Cabaret.

The unfortunate result is that since 2000 there are far fewer venues. For local musicians and musical groups, venues, where can perform and establish themselves, are hard to find or rent. This has negatively impacted Vancouver's cultural "business" and life.

=== History of musical venues ===
During the 1920s, when Vancouver prospered as a "free port" supplying illicit whiskey to the US Pacific Northwest (either Canadian-made or shipped in by sea from Mexico), the city's night life boomed. Several swank dinner clubs opened, despite restrictive liquor and entertainment laws. The best-known of Vancouver's dinner club was The Cave on Hornby Street. A block south of the Cave stands the (third and current) Hotel Vancouver. The latter possesses its own show room on one of its uppermost floors. The Panorama Roof on the second Hotel Vancouver building was a trellised terrace with a dance floor, whereas the new one is a ballroom with view windows. Another important dinner club was Isy's, near Bute and Georgia, although Hornby Street was the hub of the fancier end of city night life for many decades, from the 1920s to the early 1970s. Certain celebrities are associated with Vancouver's nightclub history — Mitzi Gaynor and Robert Goulet appearing regularly at the Cave among many great names who played the stalactite-decorated dinner club.

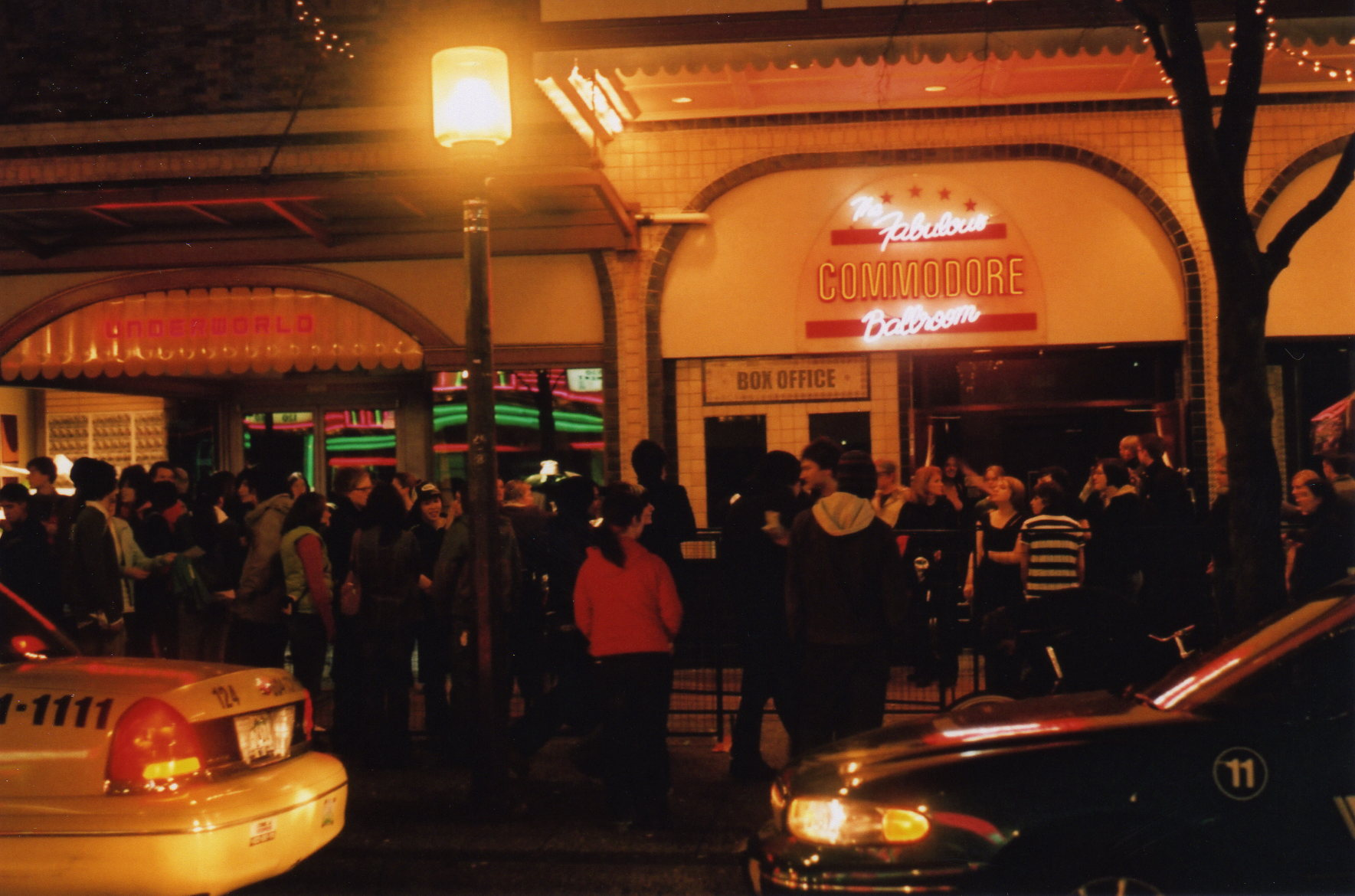
The Commodore Ballroom is one of several music venues located in Vancouver.

Also, important to performing acts was the Commodore Ballroom on Granville Street It continues as a venue for all kinds of modern popular music but was constructed in the 1920s for the great age of ballroom dancing. Its priceless original floor, now ripped out and "hardened", was a classic hardwood ballroom floor, built over tires stuffed with horsehair and known for its "bounce". The Commodore, hotel ballrooms and other venues, played host to the great touring swing bands as well as the home-grown variety – most prominently band leaders Mart Kenney and Dal Richards.

Dozens of other ballrooms and small halls are scattered throughout the city, many built by ethnic groups as community halls, and all have played a role in the city's musical life, some of them such as the Viking Hall on East Hastings operated successfully as non-ethnic commercial venues for many years. Others have been converted to studio or warehouse space, or have been forgotten because of their small scale. The wood-frame building on the southeast corner of Hastings and Columbia was built to be the finest ballroom in the city, and it was also the first. It survived other venues built later on even though it was built only a few years after the Great Fire (1886).

Until the implementation of prohibition the lower Hastings area and the old city core at Carrall and Water was choked with licensed establishments, many offering live entertainment. Opera houses of a sort were built at Gore & Pender (the Princess, under the floorboards of which was found a silver powder puff engraved "Pavlova"), Abbott and Pender, Pender and Howe, and also by the CPR adjacent to the newly rebuilt Hotel Vancouver (the second), which came to be known first as the Egyptian, also as the Orpheum and, in its final days as a movie theatre, the Lyric (where the Sears department store is now on Granville). The hotel itself had several ballrooms, each on the order of the one in today's Hotel Vancouver a block away, as well as the Panorama Roof and other drinking establishments.

The famous and glitzy Orpheum near Smithe and Granville, now a civic institution and home to the Vancouver Symphony Orchestra was built as a house of vaudeville, then quickly adapted to the age of silent film. Within its stage was housed one of the largest and last of the huge theatre Wurlitzer pipe organs, which was raised and lowered from within the stage by hydraulics. Its heady and gaudy design, relative to more classically toned rooms, was viewed as somewhat lower class in the age it was built. At that time, the symphony and what operas and musicals there were would be found in the old Orpheum (the Lyric) or on the large and comfortable stage (with no pillars as at the Lyric) of the old Capitol. The Vogue was deliberately built for touring acts (comedy, big bands, theatre), hence the shorter sightlines compared to those of the Orpheum or the old Capitol. The best acoustics were reckoned to be in the Capitol; prior to its renovation those in the Orpheum some of the worst (as it was designed for its hidden speaker system).

Today, the Meek Center's two halls are acoustically live and well-suited to unamplified performance by a soloist or small chamber group.

Prohibition came about as a result of women's suffrage (women were the core of the anti-temperance movement and took advantage of the men being away at war to vote in prohibition by referendum; it was softened).

Because restrictive liquor laws forbade live music in ordinary bars, there was no long-standing popular music tradition of the kind associated with places with more liberal entertainment laws. During the 1960s when popular youth culture flourished (in spite of all restrictive laws), clubs such as the Retinal Circus on Davie Street in the West End and Rohans Rockpile in Kitsilano were the hubs of the hippie scene.

== Dissemination of local music ==
In the 1990s the Canadian Broadcasting Corporation's funding cuts led to the elimination of most of the broadcasting of locally resident musicians, the demise of the CBC Radio Orchestra and financial hardships faced by the Vancouver Symphony Orchestra and other distinguished local professional musicians. Initial CBC broadcasting and promotion previously assisted some local performers to acquire international performing careers. Local musicians are thus at a disadvantage, for national broadcasters in Europe and elsewhere regularly provide that opportunity to their aspiring performers of national stature.

Several Vancouver radio stations broadcast Vancouver pop musicians: three student-operated post-secondary institution stations, CiTR of UBC(101.9 FM), CJSF of SFU (90.1 FM) and Evolution of BCIT (107.9), the non-profit community-run CFRO (Co-op Radio, 100.5 FM). The for-profit SHORE 104.3 FM also features local musicians.

== Music education ==
=== School music ===
The appointment of Burton Kurth 1937 as Supervisor of Music in the Vancouver public school system contributed significantly to the creation of fine school choir, orchestra and band programs in many schools. UBC's offering of courses and later degrees in music trained educators who further developed the music programs of Vancouver schools. With the advent of the BC Liberal government in 2001, and its limited funding of public schools, school districts gradually eliminated many school' music programs, redirecting scant funds to provide urgently needed ESL training.

=== Post-secondary music programs ===
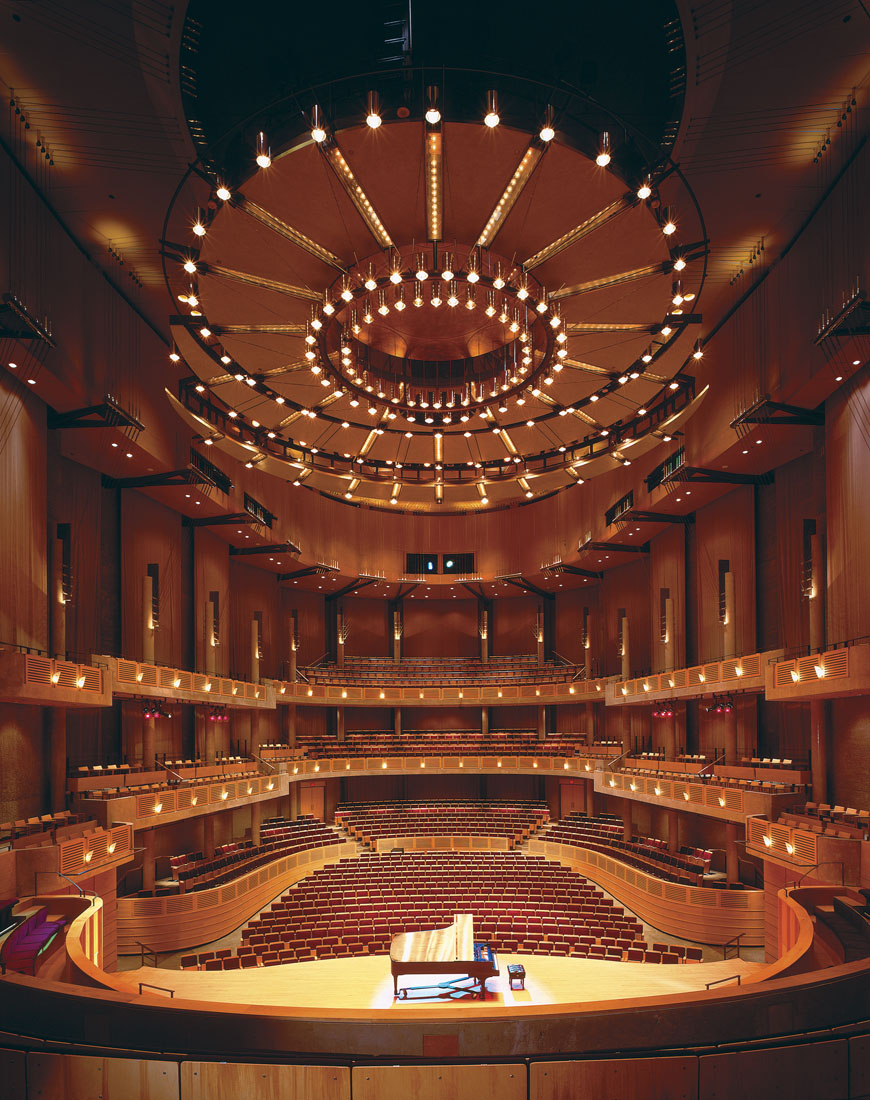
The Chan Centre for the Performing Arts is a performing arts centre located at the University of British Columbia. The centre is used by a variety of UBC departments, including their School of Music.

The University of British Columbia offers bachelors, masters, and doctoral degrees in performance, composition, theory, musicology and ethnomusicology. Simon Fraser University in Burnaby offers more interdisciplinary Bachelor and Master of Fine Arts degrees with a music speciality. Capilano University offers a Bachelor of Music Therapy and Bachelor of Music in jazz. Capilano and other colleges are known for their jazz and popular music programs. Kwantlen Polytechnic University in Surrey and Trinity Western University in Langley offer BA music degrees. Both Vancouver Community College and Douglas College have two-year music programs, some of which provide transfer credits to students subsequently admitted to universities offering music degrees. The Vancouver Academy of Music has offered a Bachelor of Music in performance.

=== Music instruction for the general public ===
The British Columbia Registered Music Teachers Association is the largest music teaching organisation in Greater Vancouver, and elsewhere in the province. It certifies those who hold an approved music degree or diploma and evidence of pedagogical training or experience in one or more of the following: instrumental or vocal performance, music notation (more commonly known as "theory" or "rudiments"), harmony, counterpoint, music analysis, music history and composition.

Community-based, non-profit music schools include the VSO School of Music, the Vancouver Academy of Music, the Sarah McLachlan School of Music, the Delta Community Music School, the Langley Community Music School, the Richmond Music School, Coquitlam's Place Des Arts and Abbotsford's Central Valley Academy of Music; these belong to the British Columbia Association of Community Music Schools.

These organisations tend to prepare many of their students for the nationwide graded and diploma examinations of the Royal Conservatory of Music and at the advanced level for students seeking admission to university music degree programs.

In addition, there are a large number of for-profit music businesses offering instruction. For example, the Nimbus School of Recording & Media offers classes in the music business, game/video music, urban music, and advanced audio production.

== Classical music ==
=== Organizations presenting concerts ===
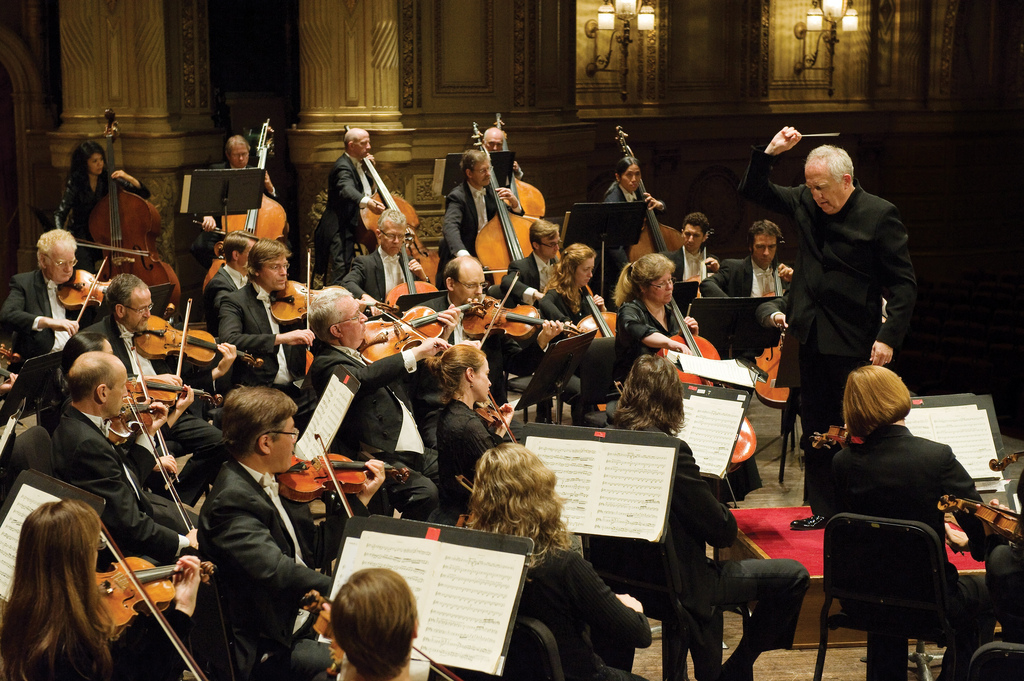
The Vancouver Symphony Orchestra conducted by Bramwell Tovey. The ensemble is the third largest orchestra in Canada and the largest performing arts organization in Western Canada.

Classical music performances are given by professional ensembles such as Vancouver Symphony Orchestra, the Vancouver Cantata Singers, the Vancouver Opera, the City Opera of Vancouver, Vancouver New Music Society, the Vancouver Chamber Music Society, Early Music Vancouver, the Pacific Baroque Orchestra Music in the Morning and musica intima (the latter a professional vocal ensemble which continues to perform and record the works of Canadian and other contemporary composers and arrangers). The Vancouver Centre of the Royal Canadian College of Organists regularly presents organists both local and international in recitals.

It is noteworthy that neither the Vancouver Symphony Orchestra nor the Vancouver Opera have ever had music directors who were Canadian-born or female, whereas the Vancouver Cantata Singers and the Vancouver Chamber Choir have been led by locally-born musicians.

=== Organs and organists ===
==== Organs ====
Recent tracker action instruments exist at West Vancouver United Church (Pasi Organ Builders), Christ Church (Anglican) Cathedral (Kenneth Jones), the Danish Lutheran Church in Burnaby (Marcussen), the University of British Columbia's School of Music (Casavant Frères) and Gloria Dei Lutheran Church in North Vancouver (Adrian Koppejan). Organs in acoustically "live" spaces include those of St. Paul's Anglican (Casavant Frères, circa 1913), Holy Rosary Roman Catholic Cathedral (Karn-Warren, rebuilt by Casavant Frères), Holy Trinity Anglican (historic Casavant), St. James' Anglican Church (Casavant Frères) and in Mission at the Roman Catholic Abbey (Casavant). Other substantial electro-pneumatic instrument exist in churches as follows: (1) in Vancouver at St Andrews-Wesley United Church (Keefer-Casavant), Pacific Spirit United Church (Casavant Frères); (2) in New Westminster at Holy Trinity Anglican Pro-Cathedral (Harold Keefer), Queen's Avenue United (Casavant); (3) in White Rock at Star of the Sea Catholic (Koppejan). The most recent pipe organ is the Casavant in First Christian Reformed in Langley.

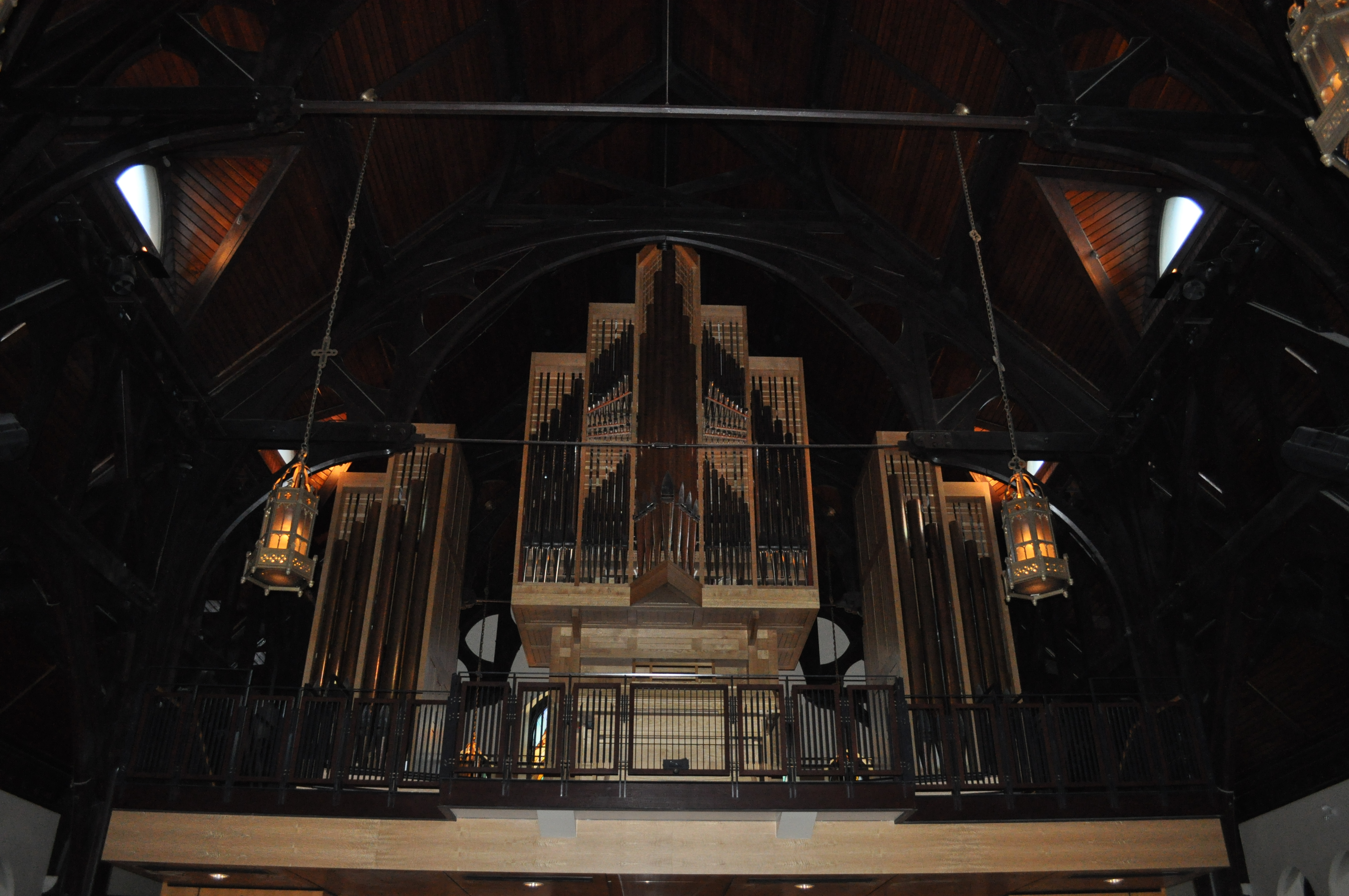
The organ used in Christ Church Cathedral. The cathedral's organ is the city's most prominent.

==== Organists ====
Vancouver-based organists of note have been Frederick Chubb, H. Hugh Bancroft, Lawrence Cluderay, Frederick Geogehan, Frederick Carter, Norman Hurrle, Hugh McLean, Edward Norman and Patrick Wedd. Concert organists currently active in the Vancouver area include internationally organ music composer Denis Bédard, Rachel Afflatt, Susan Ohannesian, Barry Waterlow, Darryl Nixon, Bryn Nixon, Michael Dirk, Michael Poon and Michael Molnar. Vancouver-born organists who were active elsewhere include George E. Chubb in Montreal and F. R. C. Clarke in Kingston, Ontario, where he headed Queen's University's music school.

==== Vancouver's pipe organ culture ====
Between 1912 and 1946, Chubb presented over 200 concerts in the highly popular organ recital series on the Robert Hope-Jones organ of Christ Church Cathedral. The series included some of the world's leading concert organists: Marcel Dupré, Herbert Austin Fricker, Alfred Hollins, T. Tertius Noble, Louis Vierne and Pietro Yon. The arrival of Hugh McLean as UBC's first organ professor and organist of Pacific Spirit (then "Ryerson") United Church led to the installation of the first neo-classical organs by Casavant Frères at both institutions. It further fostered organ music and the training of organists begun by Chubb. The 1969 national convention of the Royal Canadian College of Organists brought to the Vancouver area Dame Gillian Weir, Marilyn Mason, Anton Heiller, Peter Planyavsky and Dr. Bernard Rose and featured Hugh McLean and Frederick Carter, Vancouver-based organists at the time. The Vancouver Centre of the Royal Canadian College of Organists regularly presents recitals and masterclasses. For several decades CBC FM Radio frequently broadcast both McLean and Christ Church Cathedral organist Patrick Wedd.

=== Internationally known performers born or trained in Vancouver ===
These include pianists John Kimura Parker and James Parker, tenors Ben Heppner and Colin Balzer.

== Music business ==
New Music West, along with staging upcoming talent also host workshops for those in the music industry, or those trying to make it in the music industry. A protest to that festival's entry fee, Music waste, has now become an important alternative music festival in its own right. UBC's radio station CiTR hosts an annual battle of the bands called Shindig, along with a monthly arts and culture magazine called Discorder. The Rogue Folk Club is a part of the Vancouver scene, and puts on shows at the St. James Community Centre and the Capilano University Theatre for the Performing Arts.

== See also ==
- List of songs about Vancouver
- Music of Canada

== Sources ==
- Encyclopedia of Music in Canada
- Georgia Straight magazine, music reviews
- Vancouver: A Visual History, Bruce Macdonald, Talonbooks 1992
- Early Vancouver, Major J. S. Matthews, Vancouver Archives 1937
- World Music Guide to Vancouver
