= Abendlied =

Sacred motet by Josef Rheinberger

- Motet by Josef Rheinberger
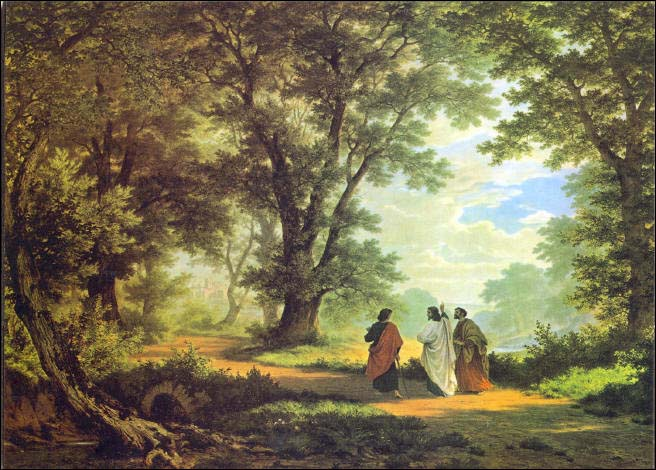
- Gang nach Emmaus, painting by Robert Zünd, 1877
- Key: F major
- Opus: 69/3
- Text: Luke 24:29
- Language: German
- Composed: 1855
- Published: 1873: Berlin by N. Simrock
- Scoring: SSATTB choir

Abendlied ("Bleib bei uns")
sung by the choir of Trinity Church Boston

Abendlied (Evening song), Op. 69/3, is a sacred motet by Josef Rheinberger for a six-part mixed choir (SSATTB). It has been regarded as his best-known sacred composition. He wrote the first version in 1855 at the age of 15.

The text is a verse from the biblical narration of the Road to Emmaus appearance according to Luke 24:29 in Martin Luther's German version of the bible:

Bleib bei uns,
denn es will Abend werden,
und der Tag hat sich geneiget.

Abide with us:
for it is toward evening,
and the day is far spent.

Rheinberger wrote a first version on 9 March 1855, one month before Easter and two weeks before his 16th birthday. At age 24, he revised the motet, for example eliminating repetition of notes and changing the marking. He published it in 1873 by N. Simrock in Berlin as No. 3 of his Opus 69, Drei geistliche Gesänge für gemischten Chor (Three sacred songs for mixed choir), the others being Morgenlied (Morning Song), on a poem by Hoffmann von Fallersleben, and Dein sind die Himmel (Yours are the Heavens) after Psalms 89:11,14a.

A Latin version ("Mane nobiscum quoniam advesperascit, inclinata est iam dies") was written in 1878 for a performance on Easter Monday of 1878 at the Allerheiligen-Hofkirche in Munich, which only permitted Latin for liturgical singing. It was published by Carus-Verlag. Carus published a recording titled Abendlied, a collection of sacred vocal music by Rheinberger, performed by the Vancouver Cantata Singers conducted by James Fankhauser.

The music in F major is marked Andante molto. The text is mostly sung syllabically. The three upper voices begin with a F major chord, held for three beats on "Bleib" (Bide) and repeated for "bei" (with), changing to an A minor chord on "uns" (us), when the lower three voices begin a similar pattern.
