= Piss (band) =

Canadian punk band

- Origin: Vancouver, British Columbia, Canada
- Genres: Punk rock; hardcore punk; noise rock
- Years active: 2023–present
- Labels: Sub Pop Records; Paper Bag Records
- Members: Taylor Zantingh; Tyler Paterson; Gavin Moya; Garreth Roberts
- Website: pisstheband.neocities.org

Piss (stylized in all caps) is a Canadian punk rock band formed in Vancouver in 2023. The band consists of Taylor Zantingh (vocals), Tyler Paterson (guitar), Gavin Moya (bass), and Garreth Roberts (drums). The band initially gained recognition for their live performances and subsequently for their debut studio album, You Made Me / Skin on Linen, released on October 30, 2026. The band's lyrics often explore themes of sexual violence, trauma, and systemic misogyny.

== History ==
Taylor Zantingh grew up in Toronto, Ontario, where she began performing in punk bands at age 15. Most notably, she fronted the band Doctors Hate Her, which released the EP Biting the Hand that Feeds You in 2019. Zantingh's experiences with sexual violence would later influence her musical career; she has described Piss as being "built on my suffering." Outside of music, she works as a teacher for children with learning disabilities.

Zantingh and guitarist Tyler Paterson first met at a house party and became friends. Zantingh, who was still living in Victoria at the time, subsequently moved in with Paterson in Vancouver, and the two began writing songs together. Shortly afterward, Paterson’s friends Gavin Moya and Garreth Roberts joined, and the band was formed. The name Piss was initially intended as a placeholder but was eventually adopted as the band's permanent name. Their first project, Three Demos, was released on February 4, 2024. It consists of three demo recordings, one of which would later appear on the band's debut album.

In 2024, Piss played their first ever show at the Red Gate Arts Society. The band began gaining attention with a series of sold-out shows at Green Auto, a DIY music venue in Vancouver. A video of one of their first live performances was seen by producer Colin Stewart, who offered to record their debut album at the Hive Creative Labs in Victoria.

In May 2025, Piss opened for UK punk band Lambrini Girls in Vancouver, and in August, the band opened for Bratmobile. In September, Piss opened for Omni at four shows during their US tour. By November, having only released three Bandcamp-exclusive tracks, the band had booked tour dates in Canada, the United States, and Europe.

In April 2026, Piss announced that they had signed with Sub Pop for international releases and Paper Bag Records for Canadian releases. In May, they performed at The Great Escape Festival in Brighton and Hove, England. In September, they performed at the End of the Road Festival at Larmer Tree Gardens in Wiltshire.

On September 2, 2026, Piss announced their debut album and released its lead single, "Time Loop at Hot Slit". On September 29, the band released the second single, "Blocking a Scene You Can't Remember", accompanied by a music video co-directed by Zantingh. On October 21, The New York Times covered the group in a video titled "We Still Need Riot Grrrl", describing them as a "genuinely exhilarating punk bricolage band". On October 29, Piss was listed as a "Band to Watch" by Stereogum.

Piss released their debut album, You Made Me / Skin on Linen, on October 30, 2026, via Sub Pop. The 15-track album was recorded over several days in the winter of 2024, and had been widely performed live prior to its studio release. The album's songwriting was praised for its exploration of trauma, sexual violence, and misogyny, and its tracks feature audio samples from Toni Morrison, Andrea Dworkin, and Manon Garcia, among others. The album was favourably reviewed, including ratings of 8.5/10 from Under the Radar and 9/10 from music critic Anthony Fantano, who called it "one of the best debuts not only of the year, but this decade." John Amen of Beats per Minute rated the album 88%, describing it as "an unflinching manifesto on rape culture and its nightmarish impact."

== Members ==
Current members

- Taylor Zantingh – vocals, lyrics
- Tyler Paterson – guitar
- Gavin Moya – bass guitar
- Garreth Roberts – drums

== Discography ==
=== Studio albums ===
- You Made Me / Skin on Linen (2026)

=== EPs ===
- Three Demos (2024)

=== Singles ===
- "Time Loop at Hot Slit" (2026)
- "Blocking a Scene You Can't Remember" (2026)
- "Rote Zora. "Resistance Is Possible." Emma, No. 6, June 1984, pp. 39-41." (2026)
