= Music Waste =

Music festival in Vancouver, British Columbia

- Genre: Indie rock, alternative rock, experimental rock, singer-songwriter, electronica, underground hip-hop, folk, punk
- Dates: May, June
- Locations: Vancouver, British Columbia, Canada
- Years active: 1994–present
- Website: musicwaste.ca

Music Waste is an annual music festival held in Vancouver, British Columbia. The festival celebrated its 30th anniversary in 2024. In previous years, the festival has featured artists such as Mac DeMarco, Black Mountain, and Japandroids.

== History ==
Music Waste was founded in 1994 as a protest against the corporate-sponsored New Music West festival. The festival grew substantially from its inception to the early 2010s, eventually featuring comedy and arts performances in addition to the musical acts.

From 2004 to 2008, Music Waste was organized by Only, who also printed a festival guide featuring write-ups about the bands performing. Alternative music magazine Discorder later took over printing the festival guide.

Since 2008, Music Waste has operated as a non-profit and has been entirely volunteer-run. Music Waste 2012 took place from 7 to 10 June 2012. It featured over 100 comedy and musical acts at 24 different venues.

In 2020 and 2021, the festival was replaced by online adaptations due to the Covid-19 pandemic. In 2022, Music Waste included several shows in the parking lot of Kingsgate Mall.

The 30th iteration of Music Waste took place from 6 to 9 June 2024, featuring over 70 acts across four venues: Red Gate, The Lido, Green Auto, and 648 Kingsway. In 2026, the festival took place on a smaller scale than previous years, featuring six acts at the Wise Hall in East Vancouver. The organizers stated that they had decided to "take this year to restructure and to fundraise".

== 2012 ==
=== Musical Lineup ===
==== Wednesday, 6 June ====
- Joseph Blood
- The Abraham Singers
- Gord Grdina Trio

==== Thursday, 7 June ====
- Dirty Spells
- White Poppy
- Greenback High
- Capitol 6
- B-Lines
- Aunts and Uncles
- The Godspot
- Peace
- New Krime
- Telefoam
- Vincent Parker
- Koko
- Movieland
- Bad Channels
- Inherent Vices

==== Friday, 8 June ====
- Violet Age
- Bummer High
- Aquanaut
- The Shilohs
- Teledrome
- Hierarchies
- WATERS
- Woolworm
- Thee Ahs
- Sleuth
- Bleating Hearts
- lié
- Spider Legs
- Hole in My Head
- Sex Church
- Trail of Broken Treaties
- Spring Break
- Thin Gaze
- Gang Signs
- Evy Jane
- Gal Gracen
- Johnny de Courcy (Solo)
- Nam Shub
- Cloudsplitter
- Hermetic
- The Courtneys
- Apollo Ghosts
- Spell
- Trimesters
- Good Night Buffalo
- Hemogoblin

==== Saturday, 9 June ====
- Johnny
- Koban
- Cascadia
- Watermelon
- Real Boys
- NEEDS
- The High Drops
- Cowards
- Jay Arner
- Bleach Babes
- Sightlines
- Fieldhead
- Hallow Moon
- Kellarissa
- Slight Birching
- Bertha Cool
- Previous Tenants
- Slim Fathers
- Crystal Swells
- Yung Mums
- Newport Beach
- Victories
- Phoenix Thunderbird
- Korean Gut
- B. A. Johnston
- Ketamines
- Weathered Pines
- The Lost Lovers Brigade
- Reverter
- Johnny Payne (The Shilos)
- L.A. Lights
- Konner Whitney (KoKo)
- Crystal Dorval (White Poppy)
- Big Nothing
- Nurse
- juvenile hall
- The New Values
- World Club
- Eeek!
- Brazilian Money
- Slam Dunk
- //Zoo
- Chris-a-Riffic
- Freak Heat Waves
- Menopause
- Isotopes
- Babysitter
- Too High Crew

==== Sunday, 10 June ====
- Horse Girls
- Weed
- Twin River
- Village
- Pleasure Cruise
- The Ballantynes
