= Kingsgate Mall =

Shopping mall in Vancouver, British Columbia, Canada

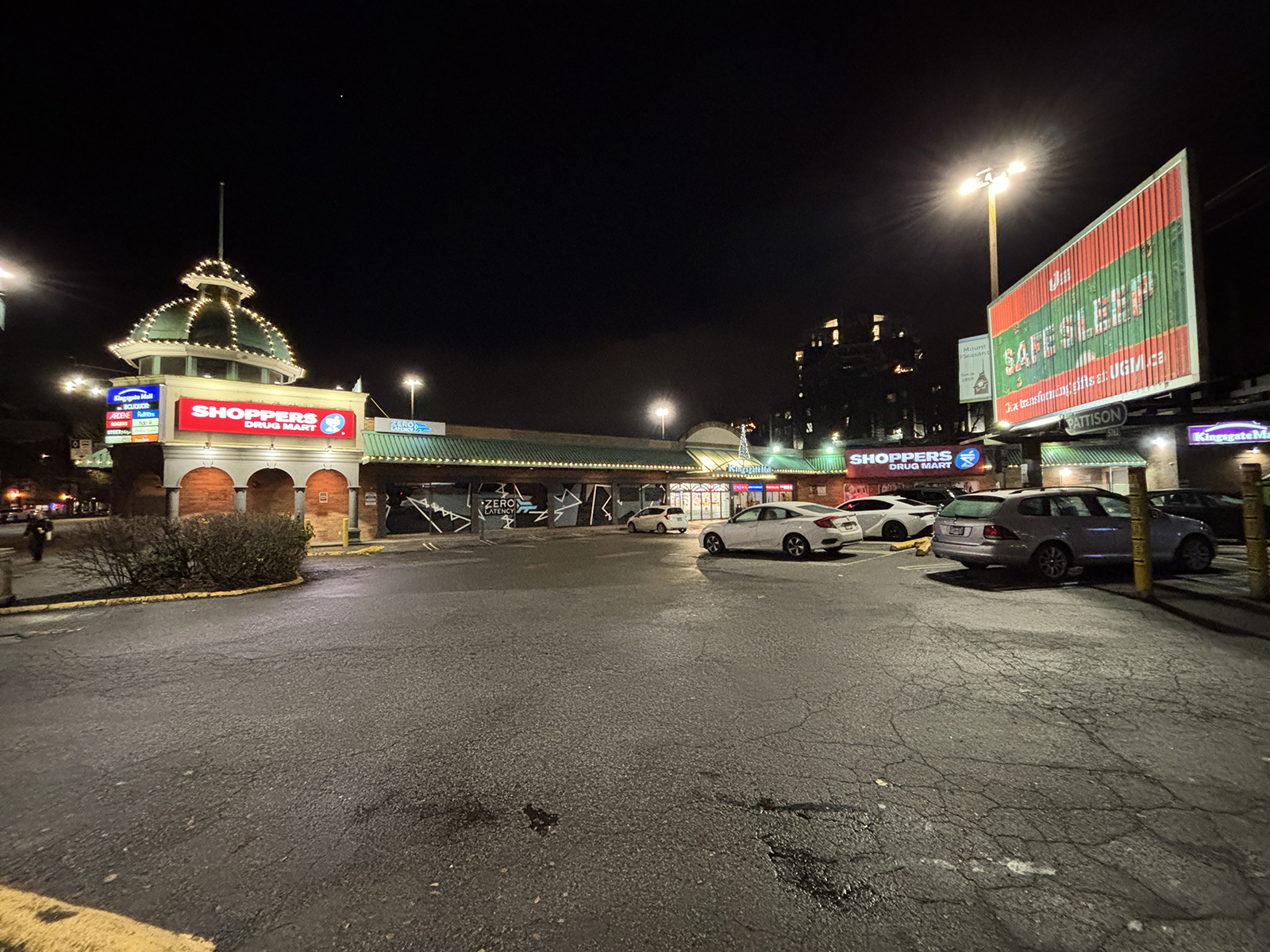
- Kingsgate Mall at night in 2024
- Location: 370 E Broadway, Vancouver, British Columbia
- Coordinates: 49.262°N 123.097°W
- Opened: March 28, 1974; 52 years ago
- Developer: Beedie Development Group
- Owner: Vancouver School Board
- Num. of stores: 31
- Floor area: 12,800 m^{2} (138,000 sq ft)
- Floors: 2
- Website: kingsgatemall.com

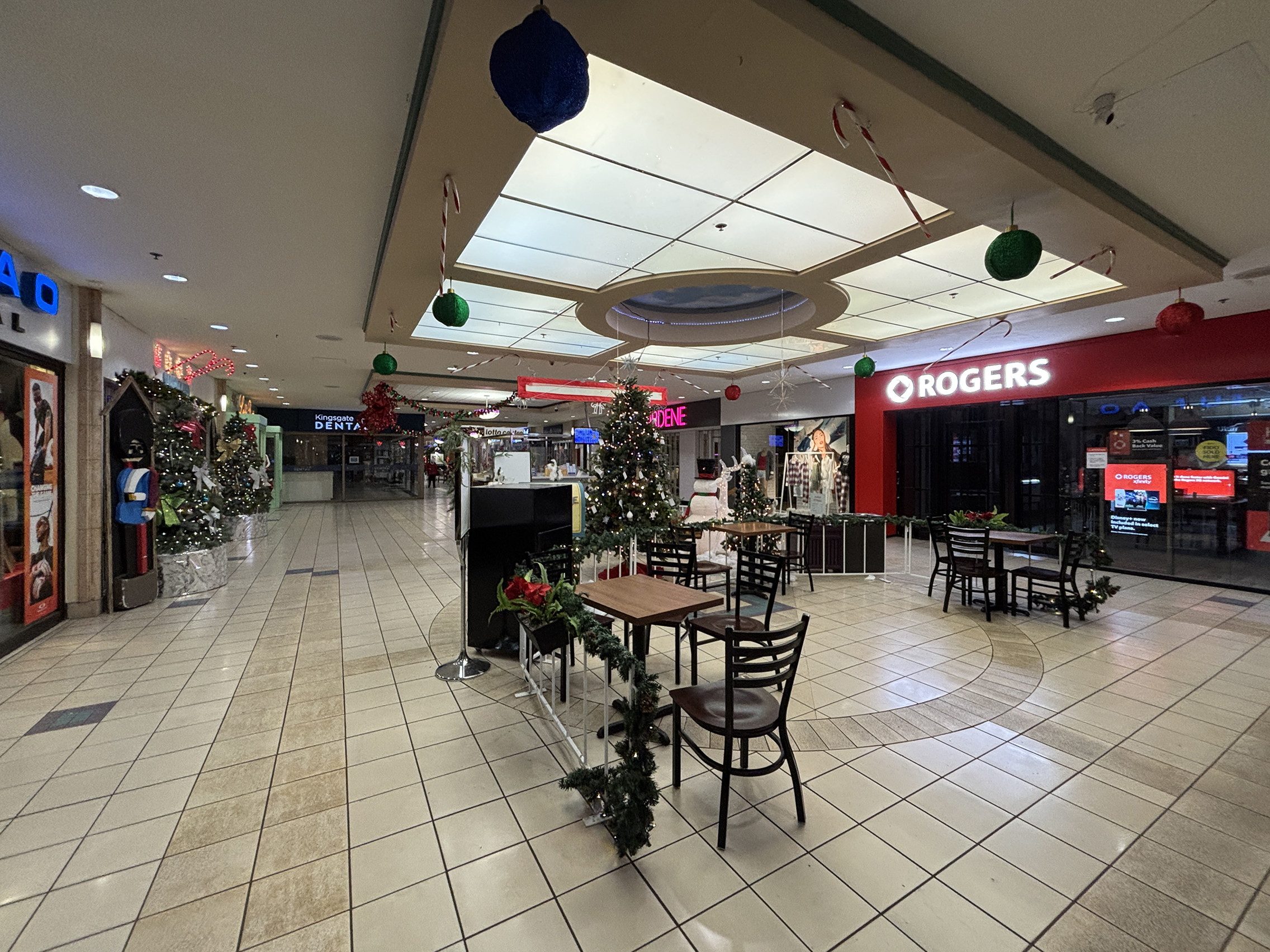
Main Floor shops

Kingsgate Mall is a shopping mall in the Mount Pleasant neighbourhood of Vancouver, British Columbia, Canada. Construction on the mall began in 1972 with the grand opening being held on March 28, 1974. The land the mall stands on is owned by the Vancouver School Board.

== History ==
The land that the mall now stands on was the location of Mount Pleasant School, originally built in 1888. In 1971, the Vancouver School Board decided to lease the land for development in order to provide funds for the board. The contract, worth $2.5 million was awarded to Royal Oak Holdings (currently Beedie Development LTD). In 1972, Mount Pleasant School (now Mount Pleasant Elementary School) was relocated to Guleph Street and the original site closed.

Later in the same year, demolishing of the structures commenced. Construction of the mall was completed in 1974 and the opening took place on March 28, 1974, with a three-day celebration. Some initial tenants included Safeway, Fields, Radio Shack, Shoppers Drug Mart, and the Mount Pleasant Branch of the Vancouver Public Library.

During the 1980s and 1990s, the mall was dubbed "Hellsgate Mall" due to frequent crime in the mall and in the surrounding neighbourhood.

The mall's reputation began to turn by the 2010s under the leadership of mall manager Leyda Molnar, who implemented better security and began to host community events. Molnar began working for the mall in 1999 before becoming the property manager in 2006.

In 2024, the mall celebrated its 50th anniversary.

== Community events ==
In 2022, Music Waste festival held several concerts at the mall.

The mall is host to seasonal, such as dancers for Chinese New Year and Saint Patrick's Day, Santa around Christmas and pumpkin carving around Halloween. The mall has also hosted children's reading days and senior's days, which are open to the community.

== Conflict & controversy ==
In 2023, it was alleged by the Vancouver School Board that Kingsgate Property LTD, a subsidiary of the original developer Beedie Development Group owed $50 million in unpaid rent. In response to this the board threatened to terminate the lease in a possible bid to redevelop the land.

== Popular culture ==
In 2022, Canadian musicians Arkells and Tegan and Sara released a music video for the song "Teenage Tears" that features the mall. Other tributes include the song "Kingsgate Mall" by the band Magic Ass and "Kingsgate Mall Tribute" by VickyVan01 on YouTube. There is also a short track roller derby team located in Vancouver called the "Kingsgate Mallrats".
