= Mesa Luna =

The Mesa Luna was a Salsa club and restaurant located on West Broadway in Vancouver, British Columbia, Canada. The Mesa Luna is notable for being "Western Canada's only All Age/licensed concert venue." Utilizing a wristband ID system, the club was able to host minors as well as serve alcohol.

== Events ==
On Fridays and Saturdays, the Mesa Luna was host to Salsa dancing nights. Sunday through Thursday, it was available for private booking. Due to the efforts of local concert promoters, these private booking nights were utilized frequently to host local metalcore and post-hardcore shows. Among the many artists who played there were Lights Below, Protest The Hero, Arcade Fire, The Birthday Massacre, Misery Signals, A Textbook Tragedy, Daggermouth, Against Me!, Converge, City and Colour, The Blood Brothers, Piebald, Carpenter, and Dust.

== Closure ==
In early May, 2006, the Mesa Luna closed its doors. The closure was a significant loss to the local music scene, as the venue had acted as a hub of local music for several years.
