= James Fankhauser =

American conductor, tenor and educator (1939–2025)

- Born: James Lee Fankhauser; August 26, 1939; Lyons, Kansas, U.S.
- Died: June 13, 2025 (aged 85)
- Occupations: Choral conductor; music educator; tenor

James Lee Fankhauser (August 26, 1939 – June 13, 2025) was an American conductor, tenor and educator who was primarily known for his work within the field of choral music in Canada.

== Life and career ==
Born in Lyons, Kansas, Fankhauser began his professional studies at Purdue in 1957 where he studied engineering. He entered the music program at Southwestern College in his native Kansas in the Fall of 1958 and transferred after two years to the Oberlin Conservatory of Music where he obtained a Bachelor of Music in 1962. He was awarded a Fulbright Grant which enabled him to pursue graduate studies in vocal performance in London at the Royal Academy of Music and choral conducting with Sir David Lumsden at New College, University of Oxford in 1962–1963.

In 1972 he received a Rockefeller Fellowship to study with Maestro John Nelson at the Aspen Choral Institute as a Conducting Fellow. He was then appointed Nelson's Assistant Director of the Institute for the next summer, during which he conducted concerts in a Bach Cantata Series.

In 1973 he was appointed the music director of the Vancouver Cantata Singers (VCS), remaining in that position until 2000. Under his leadership the VCS won several notable music competitions, including the BBC International Choral Competition and the CBC National Radio Competition. He made several recordings with VCS, one of which was nominated for a Juno Award in 1994. The choir has also appeared numerous times on Canadian television and radio under his direction. In 1981 the choir won the BBC's International Choral Competition, "Let the people sing," winning the Israeli Silver Cup for best performance. The Cantata Singers made three professional CDs over the years: Venetian Vespers of 1640 (Antonio Rigatti), Skylark Records; A 1640 Venetian Mass (Rigatti), an Analekta fleurs de lys recording; and Abendlied, a Carus-Verlag recording featuring Josef Rheinberger choral music including his Abendlied. The Venetian Vespers of 1640 won the Association of Canadian Choral Conductor's 1994 National Choral Award: Outstanding Choral Recording.

Fankhauser returned to the United States to attend the University of California, Berkeley where he studied musicology from 1963 to 1966. After the first year he was appointed Director of the UC men's Glee Club and women's Treble Clef, touring yearly throughout California. He sang several tenor roles in the Berkeley production and professional recording of Monteverdi's opera, L'Incoronazione di Poppea. Graduating in 1966 with an M.A. in musicology, he received the Eisner Prize for outstanding musical talent. In the summer of 1964 he studied voice on a scholarship at the Tanglewood Music Center where he gained the opportunity to perform as a soloist at the Tanglewood Music Festival.

In 1966 Fankhauser joined the faculty as a sabbatical replacement for Professor Iva Dee Hiatt at Smith College in Northampton, Massachusetts, where he conducted choirs and taught voice during the 1966–1967 school year. He accepted a job at Hamilton College in Clinton, New York, where he taught music theory and conducted the university's choirs from 1967 to 1973. During this period a great performance of the Mozart Vespers K. 339 under his baton (with the famous Paul Kuentz orchestra) was recorded and issued on a now very rare lp. He left there to join the voice and choral conducting faculty at the University of British Columbia where he remained until 2000. He directed the UBC University Singers for many years during which time the group won several singing competitions, including the CBC National Radio Competition in 1994, which led to the BBC's International Radio Competition at which they were out-sung by the Norwegians. But in 1995 they went to the prestigious International Chamber Choir Competition Marktoberdorf, where they won First Prize against choirs from many countries in Europe and Asia.

Fankhauser served as the director of the Manitoba Youth Choir Camp in 1983. He was principal conductor for the Saskatchewan Sings in 1987. He also worked actively as a clinician for choirs in Canada and led masterclasses and workshops in conducting in Alberta and British Columbia.

Interestingly, Fankhauser stated in 2018: "When I graduated from college during the Vietnam war and was granted a Fulbright scholarship to study music at Oxford University, my ignorant, small town draft board refused to let me go. I asked for a reconsideration by the state draft board, which also refused. I had one more place to appeal the decision: the President of the United States. I did so, and John F. Kennedy agreed with me. I did study at Oxford and went on to win national and international competitions with my choirs from the three universities at which I taught during my career. Thank you, JFK!"

Fankhauser died on June 13, 2025, at the age of 85.
