= She Teaches Defeat =

Studio album by Lights Below
- Released: September 4, 2007
- Recorded: 2007
- Genre: Post-hardcore, metalcore
- Length: 28:21
- Label: Torque Recording Company

She Teaches Defeat is the second release from Canadian post-hardcore band Lights Below, released on September 4, 2007. This was their last release before their break-up several months later.

== Track listing ==
1. Bad Dudes
2. Jaguar Shark
3. Here's Lookin' At You J-Mo
4. Gentlemen, You Can't Fight In Here (This Is The War Room)
5. Big Country
6. The Crystal Brawl
7. Everybody In 1955 Was On Fire
8. The Crowsnest

== Singles ==
- Bad Dudes

== Trivia ==
- The song title "Bad Dudes" was taken from the 1988 Nintendo release of the same name. The game was based around the kidnapping of US President Ronnie by ninjas. To save him, the government turns to Blade & Striker - a couple of 'Bad Dudes'. A 'Bad Dude' is also a popular alcoholic drink.
- The song title "Everybody In 1955 Was On Fire" was a quote from Peter Griffin on the television show Family Guy.
- The song title "Gentlemen, You Can't Fight in Here (This is the War Room)" is from the film Dr. Strangelove or: How I Learned to Stop Worrying and Love the Bomb.
- Demos for tracks 3,4, 6, and 7 were made available on the band's MySpace profile months previous to the album's release.
