= Hugh McLean (organist) =

- Born: Hugh John McLean; 5 January 1930; Winnipeg, Manitoba, Canada
- Died: 30 July 2017 Naples, Florida, United States
- Genres: Classical music; Church music
- Occupations: Organist, musicologist, choirmaster

Hugh John McLean CM (5 January 1930 – 30 July 2017) was a Canadian organist, choirmaster, pianist, harpsichordist, administrator, teacher, musicologist, composer, and editor.

== Early life ==
Born in Winnipeg, Manitoba, McLean was a boy chorister at All Saints' Anglican Church in Winnipeg. While in Winnipeg, he studied piano and organ with Russell Standing for ten years, then studied organ for two years with Hugh Bancroft in Vancouver, before taking his first position as organist at St. Luke's Anglican Church, Winnipeg, age 15. He was first heard in recital, as an organist, on the CBC in 1947.

== Career ==
In 1949, McLean travelled to the Royal College of Music, England on an organ scholarship. His teachers were Arthur Benjamin (piano), Sir William H. Harris (organ), and W.S. Lloyd Webber (composition). From 1951 to 1956, he was the first Canadian to be named Mann Organ Scholar at King's College, Cambridge, under the supervision of Boris Ord, and later David Willcocks (who had preceded him as Organ Scholar). The 1954 recording Festival of Lessons and Carols as Sung on Christmas Eve at King's College, Cambridge, upon which McLean is featured, has been named to the Library of Congress's National Recording Registry. When Boris Ord declined to give organ lessons to then-chorister Simon Preston, Preston took organ instruction from McLean. McLean made his London debut in 1955 with Adrian Boult and the London Philharmonic Orchestra, in the premiere performance of Malcolm Arnold's Organ Concerto; a Royal Command Concert in the presence of Queen Elizabeth II at the Royal Festival Hall. During Canada's Centennial year, 1967, McLean was a featured soloist at Expo 67 on the Casavant Organ installation at "Man and His World." That same year, he presented a recital at the International Congress of Organists, held in Canada.

Upon his return to Vancouver, McLean served as organist-choirmaster at Ryerson United Church 1957-73, founded and conducted the Vancouver Cantata Singers, founded the Hugh McLean Consort – a Baroque music instrumental ensemble, and founded the CBC Vancouver Singers. He taught 1967–69 at the University of Victoria and 1969–73 at the University of British Columbia. From 1973-1980, he served as dean of the Faculty of Music, University of Western Ontario (now Western University), where he continued to teach organ, harpsichord, and music history. He was also organist and choirmaster at the Church of Saint John the Evangelist during his time in London, collaborating with local organ builder Gabriel Kney in the installation of the parish's Kney tracker organ. In 1995 he retired as professor emeritus, and became Minister of Music at All Saints Episcopal Church, Winter Park, Florida. He retired as Winter Park's Minister of Music in 2010.

As an organ recitalist, McLean was frequently heard on the CBC, and appeared in every major Canadian centre. He also broadcast with the BBC, the Australian Broadcasting Corporation, Swiss Radio, and NHK Japan. He was heard on Polish radio as a conductor (1975), and in 1988 was the first Canadian organist to tour the USSR. McLean performed in San Francisco, Los Angeles, and Chicago, and at two of Bach's churches, the Blasiuskirche of Mühlhausen and the Thomaskirche of Leipzig. He gave the Canadian premieres of Hindemith's Organ Concerto No. 1 (19 September 1970) and No. 2 (16 May 1972) with the CBC Vancouver Chamber Orchestra, conducted by John Avison. He appeared as organ soloist with the Toronto Symphony Orchestra, performing Saint-Saëns' Symphony No. 3 (3 and 4 April 1979), Poulenc's Concerto (12, 13, and 16 September 1982) in the inaugural concerts of Roy Thomson Hall on the Gabriel Kney Organ that he helped to design. He premiered Bengt Hambraeus' Icons (29 September 1975) in Toronto during Canada Music Week. He also toured Great Britain, Japan, Scandinavia, and Switzerland, and presented lecture-recitals and masterclasses in Germany and Australia.

McLean specialized in 17th- and 18th-century musicology studies, and was awarded Canada Council grants in 1960 and 1965 to investigate the Cummings collection of western manuscripts at Nanki Music Library, Japan. A further grant in 1972 enabled him to visit Poland and the German Democratic Republic, where he located a lost opera by Alessandro Scarlatti, and works by Johann Hermann Schein. From 1989, he served as a consultant for the Royal Conservatory of Music, Toronto, editing new series of repertoire for voice, violin, and piano that included translations of song texts from French, German, English, and Norwegian into English, new arrangements of folk songs, and original compositions. He also served on the editorial board of the new C.P.E. Bach edition, and wrote 19 articles for the New Grove Dictionary of Music and Musicians.

== Editions ==
- Voluntary in C for organ by John Stanley (Novello 18415, 1957)
- Andante in F for mechanical organ (K. 616) by Mozart (OUP, 1958)
- Organ Concerto in B-flat op. 4, no. 5 by William Felton (OUP, 1958)
- Organ Works of Purcell (Novello 1968)
- Two Voluntaries by John Blow from the Nanki Manuscript (Novello, 1971)
- Collected works : for organ and solo instrument of J.L. Krebs (Novello, 1981)
- The Will of God is Always Best for oboe (trumpet) and organ / H.N. Gerber (Concordia, 1984)
- Sonata in D minor for violin and continuo : anonymous. Musica da camera, no. 103. (Oxford University Press, 1987)
- Organ Music II = Musique d'orgue II / Hugh J. McLean, editor. The Canadian Musical Heritage, v. 19. Ottawa : Canadian Musical Heritage Society = Société pour le patrimoine musical canadien, 1997.

== Works ==
- Incidental music for CBC radio dramas: The Summer School (1957), The Shoemaker's Holiday (1959), Much Ado About Nothing (1962), Antony and Cleopatra (1964)
- A song for bedtime / music by Hugh J. McLean; words by Kathleen M. Hill. Thompson choral library; G-173. Toronto : G.V. Thompson, c1984.
- Ride on, King Jesus : for SATB and organ / Hugh J. Mclean (arr.). Borough Green, Kent : Novello, 29 0557 04 c1985.
- 'Chanson folklorique' and 'The Grand Old Duke of York' / Hugh J. McLean (arr.) in Introductory Repertoire Album : a collection of violin pieces leading to the grade 1 level of the Royal Conservatory of Music. Toronto: Royal Conservatory of Music, 1992.
- 'Skye boat song' (Traditional Scottish) / Hugh J. McLean (arr.) in Violin series: Violin Repertoire, 3. Mississauga, Ont. : Frederick Harris, 2006.

== Awards and honours ==
- Associated Board, Royal Schools of Music, scholarship in organ and piano (1948)
- Royal College of Organists, Sawyer Prize (1950)
- King's College, Cambridge, UK: Dr. Mann Organ Studentship (1951)
- Fellow, Royal College of Organists (1953)
- Arnold Bax Commonwealth Medal (1954)
- King's College, Cambridge, UK: Dr. Mann Research Studentship (1955)
- Harriet Cohen Bach Medal (1955)
- Fellow, Royal Canadian College of Organists (1957)
- Canada Council Research Grants (1960, 1965, 1972)
- University of British Columbia, Honorary Organist (1966)
- Royal Society of Canada (1977)
- Juror, St. Alban's International Organ Competition (1981)
- Juror, International J.S. Bach Competition, Leipzig (1984)
- Fellow, Royal Society of Canada
- Fellow, Royal College of Music (1985)
- Member, Order of Canada (1987)
- Order of the Stern Der Völkerfreundschaft (German Democratic Republic, 1990)

== Premieres ==
- Arnold, Malcolm. Organ Concerto (London, Royal Festival Hall, November 1955)
- Hindemith, Paul. Organ Concerto No. 1 (Canadian premiere, Vancouver, BC, 19 September 1970)
- Hindemith, Paul. Organ Concerto No. 2 (British premiere, BBC, 1963; Canadian premiere, Vancouver, BC, 16 May 1972)
- Healey, Derek. The Lost Traveller's Dream, Opus 35. 1970. Organ. Jaymar 1972 (UBC, Vancouver, Canada, 3 March 1970), dedicated to Hugh McLean by the composer.
- Hambraeus, Bengt. Icons (Toronto, 29 September 1975)
- Healey, Derek. Homage F.D.: Rhapsody for Piano and Organ, commissioned by McLean, and performed with his wife, pianist Anne McLean (26 Nov 1986)

== Recordings ==
- A Festival of lessons and carols [sound recording] : as performed on Christmas Eve in King's College Chapel, Cambridge / Directed by Boris Ord; Hugh McLean, organ. London, [England] : Argo, RG. 39 [1954?]
- Evensong [sound recording]. The Choir of King's College Chapel, Cambridge; Boris Ord, director; Hugh McLean, organ. London : Argo, RG 99 [1956]
- Tudor church music [sound recording] / Orlando Gibbons. The Choir of King's College Chapel, Cambridge; Hugh McLean, organist; Boris Ord, director. [New York] : Westminster, XWN 18165 [1956]
- Church music [sound recording] / Gibbons. King's College (University of Cambridge) Choir. Jacobean Consort of Viols. Simon Preston, organ (works 1–6), Hugh McLean, organ (works 7–12). Recorded at King's College Chapel, Cambridge, 1955 and 1958. [Germany] : Decca 433 677-2, c1992, p1959.
- Six voluntaries for organ [sound recording] / Robert Turner, performed by Hugh McLean. Music and musicians of Canada; v. 14: RCA Victor, CCS 1020 (10TPRS-1389), [1967]. With Jean Coulthard's Five Part Songs for chorus and piano, performed by the CBC Vancouver Chorus, conducted by McLean.
- Duo, viola, piano [sound recording] / Barbara Pentland, Smyth Humphreys, viola; Hugh McLean, piano. Music and musicians of Canada; v. 11: RCA Victor, CC 1017 (10TPRM-1374-1375), [1967]. With Benjamin Britten's Lachrymae and William Keith Rogers' Sonatina for Viola and Piano.
- Oeuvres de Leonard Wilson [sound recording]. CBC Vancouver Choir, and Hugh McLean, conductor and organist. [S.l.] : Service International de Radio-Canada, n.d.
- Hugh McLean, organist, with the CBC Vancouver Chamber Orchestra conducted by John Avison [sound recording]. [Canada] : CBC, SM 129 [197-]. Concerto for organ / Malcolm Arnold – Organ concerto in B flat, op. 4, no. 5 / William Felton – Sonata in E flat, K.67 for organ and orchestra / W.A. Mozart – Sonata in C major, K. 336, for organ and orchestra / W.A. Mozart – Concerto in F major, for organ and orchestra / Frantisek Xaver Brixi.
- The Vancouver Bach Choir [sound recording] / Hugh McLean, organ; Simon Streatfeild, conductor. Ensemble, ES 7002, [1971?].
- Music for Christmas [sound recording] / Hugh McLean, organ. CBC Broadcast Recording, SM 209, [1972?].
- Collected works for organ and solo instrument [sound recording] / Johann Ludwig Krebs. 2 sound discs. Warszawa : Muza, SX 0982 [1973]
- Orgelbüchlein [sound recording] / J.S. Bach. 2 sound discs. Warszawa : Veriton, SXV-767-768 [1973]
- Hugh McLean [sound recording] : organ. [Montréal] : Radio Canada International, RCI 481 [1978]. Two hymn preludes / Healey Willan (3:05) – Paean : Resurrection of Christ / Barrie Cabena (4:20) – Suite de Pâques / Roger Matton (12:30) – Toccata on o filii et filae / W. Lynnwood Farnam (2:10) – Haec Dies / Derek Healey (3:05) – Icons / Bengt Hambraeus (20:05).
- Organ music of J.S. Bach for the season of Christmas / Hugh McLean, organ. Warszawa : Veriton, SXV-752 [1980] Recorded in July 1972 on the cathedral organ of Kamie'n Pomorski.
- Bach – 300 – Handel [sound recording] : a celebration of genius.
- Four organ concertos [sound recording] / George Frideric Handel. Hugh McLean, organ; CBC Vancouver Orchestra; Mario Bernardi, conductor. Toronto : CBC SM5041. p1985.
- River of fire [sound recording] / Lawrence Cherney. Montréal : McGill University Records 85026, p1986. McLean performs Sheng for oboe and organ by Bengt Hambraeus.
- Classical Christmas [sound recording] : instrumental music performed by Goliard Brass Quintet; Milan Kymlicka (small instrumental ensemble); Rick Wilkins (small instrumental ensemble); Guido Basso (small instrumental ensemble); The Buddy Munro Trio; Hugh McLean, organ. [S.l. : s.n., VMK-1085 1997?]
- Solo works for harp, organ & piano [sound recording] / Robert Turner. McLean performs Turner's Little Suite for organ, recorded at Ryerson United Church, Vancouver, Dec. 1959. [Winnipeg] : Robert Turner, [2011].

== Writings (chronological listing) ==
- 'Blow and Purcell in Japan.' Musical Times, v. 104 (Oct 1963): 702, 704–705.
- 'Vancouver, the story of a Cultural "Western."' ''Music: The AGO and RCCO magazine, v. 3 (April 1969): 36–37.
- 'New Polish sources for the early German Baroque.' Canadian Association of University Schools of Music Journal, v. 2 (Fall 1972): 1–5.
- 'Technology in the education of the musician.' ISME Yearbook, v. 2 (1974): 120–124.
- 'Good Manners, or Good Sense?' Music: The AGO and RCCO magazine, v. 9 (July 1975): 26–27.
- 'Mozart parodies and Haydn perplexities: new sources in Poland.' Studies in Music from the University of Western Ontario, v. 1 (1976): 1–7.
- 'Caritas domi incipit: an early 18th-century organ book.' Studies in Music from the University of Western Ontario, v. 2 (1977): 52–64.
- 'The concerted organ fantasia and chorale in 18th-century Germany.' Organist: Journal of the Japanese Society of Organists, no. 4 (1977)
- 'Canada: its musical unity and diversity.' Transactions of the Royal Society of Canada, v. 16 (1978).
- 'Krebs's concerted chorales and fantasias.' Musical Times, v. 122 (November 1981): 770–771.
- 'Bach and Schwarzschild,' letter to the Editor. Musical Times, v. 122 (November 1981): 734.
- 'Healey Willan and the Tractarian Movement.' Studies in Music from the University of Western Ontario, no. 8 (1983): 25–36.
- 'VII International Johann Sebastian Bach Competition.' American Organist Magazine, v. 18 (November 1984): 61–62.
- 'Bernard Granville, Handel and the Rembrandts.' Musical Times, v. 126 (October 1985): 593–601.
- 'Granville, Handel and "Some Golden Rules".' Musical Times, v. 126 (November 1985): 662–665.
- 'The centenary fanfare "RSC/SRC".' Diversa, v. 3, Spring 1987
- 'Performance practice, form and text in the organ works of Dietrich Buxtehude.' In The Proceedings of the International Buxtehude/Scheidt Festival and Conference at the University of Saskatchewan November 1987 (Saskatoon 1989).
- 'H. Hugh Bancroft.' The American Organist, v. 23 (June 1989): 49–51.
- McLean, H.J. ‘The Organ Works of Heinrich Nicolaus Gerber.’ In Aspects of Keyboard Music: Essays in Honour of Susi Jeans, ed. R. Judd (Oxford, 1992), 60–80.
- 'BWV 551, A Bachian Orphan.' Bach, v. 24/1 (1993): 35–42.
- 19 articles in Grove Music Online: Johann Gottfried Krebs; Johann Valentin Eckelt; Andreas Bayer; Boris Ord; Nicolaus Better; Johann Nicolaus Müller; Christian Michael Wolff; Carlmann Kolb; Johann Gottlieb Wiedner; Daniel Erich; Georg Böhm; Nicolaus Bruhns; Johann Caspar Simon; Johann Baptist Anton Vallade; Johann Christoph Oley; Daniel Magnus Gronau; Vincent Lübeck (i, ii); W.H. Cummings.
- 'The Friederici Chamber Organ Part I.' Trinitarian, (December 2012): 9.
- 'The Friederici Chamber Organ Part I (sic, Part II).' Trinitarian, (January 2013): 9.
