= Mother Tucker's Yellow Duck =

Canadian folk-rock and psychedelic band

- Origin: Vancouver, British Columbia, Canada
- Genres: Psychedelic rock; country-rock
- Years active: 1967–1971
- Past members: Patrick Caldwell; Charlie Faulkner; Hugh Lochhead; Roger Law; Don McDougall; Leslie Law

Mother Tucker's Yellow Duck was a Canadian folk-rock and psychedelic band, formed in Vancouver, British Columbia in 1967.

== History ==
Mother Tucker's Yellow Duck was originally a group of stage performers in Vancouver who adopted different characters, including Kathy Kay ("Mother Tucker"), Patrick Caldwell ("Yellow Duck"), Bob O'Connor ("Dogan Pinkfoot") and Michael Goldman ("Garnet Crystalman"). Guitarist O'Connor then formed a real band, Medusa, with bassist Charlie Faulkner and drummer Hugh Lochhead, but when O'Connor left, Caldwell joined with Faulkner, Lochhead, and guitarist Roger Law, taking the name Mother Tucker's Yellow Duck for the band.

After adding guitarist, singer and songwriter Don McDougall, described as "a wandering folk singer from Winnipeg", they played in the Vancouver area and as far south as California. In 1968 the band won a contract with London Records where they released the single "I". After moving to Capitol Records they released the singles "One Ring Jane" and "Times Are Changing" (both 1969), and then set up their own label, Duck, with distribution through Capitol, to release their first album, Home Grown Stuff. The album, recorded in Vancouver, included a re-recorded version of "One Ring Jane", and was described by Richie Unterberger as being "extremely influenced by the San Francisco sound, with fluid guitars, harmonies, and an occasional country-folk bounce..", with the song "Someone Think" "alternat[ing] between beautifully wistful psychedelia and mind-melting distorted guitar solos." Most of their songs were co-written by McDougall, Law and Caldwell.

The band toured alongside Deep Purple, Alice Cooper and the Yardbirds, and opened a show by Cream at the Pacific Coliseum, before lead guitarist Roger Law left to be replaced by his younger brother Leslie Law. They recorded and released a second album, Starting a New Day, in 1970, more in a country-rock style, but their limited success led them to disband in 1971.

Don McDougall joined The Guess Who, appearing on several albums by the band and touring in various lineups until the 2000s. Faulkner was later in the bands Wild Root Orchestra and Dogskin Suit. Roger Law died in an auto accident in the 1990s.
