= The Orchid Highway =

The Orchid Highway is a Canadian rock band based first in Winnipeg, Manitoba, then for two years in London, UK, and lastly in Vancouver, British Columbia. The core of the band are the three Winnipeg-born Macdonald brothers Rory (bass), Jamie (guitar), and Derek (keyboards); in Vancouver they added drummer Adrian Buckley and guitarist Scott Perry, who had toured with mutual friend Todd Fancey (of the New Pornographers).

== History ==
The Orchid Highway formed in 1994 in Winnipeg. They moved to the United Kingdom in the late 1990s, where they performed in London for two years, and recorded their first EP Fourplay. On returning to Canada, the band toured about in a brightly painted bus, and worked with producer Steven Drake to record and release their first full-length album, The Orchid Highway. Positive reviews and brisk online sales brought them to the attention of Brooklyn, New York label Rainbow Quartz, who signed the band in 2008 and re-released The Orchid Highway internationally.

Singles "Next World" and "Sofa Surfer Girl" received airplay throughout Canada and the US, particularly in Hawaii; tunes from the albums were played extensively in 2008 at Maui's KEAO), and in Los Angeles on Rodney Bingenheimer's KROQ show. "Next World" was featured in Haylie Duff slasher film Fear Island, and the video for "Sofa Surfer Girl" was played on Canada's MuchMusic.

The band later relocated to Vancouver, British Columbia.
