= Thomas Donovan (musician) =

- Born: Thomas Edward Donovan; Vancouver, British Columbia, Canada
- Genres: Dance-pop, electro house
- Occupations: Singer-songwriter, musician, recording artist, producer, videographer, social activist
- Instruments: Vocals, synthesizer, piano
- Years active: 1986–present
- Label: Digital Dreams Music
- Website: thomasdonovan.com

Thomas Donovan is a Canadian dance-pop singer-songwriter and recording artist born in Vancouver. He was known in the 1990s for his string of radio and club hits. Thomas' most successful electronic music works include "A Calling Around The World", "Total Controller", "High Time", "Colorcode", "All We Need For Christmas", "She'll Do What She Wants", "Trapped", "This Time I Feel It", and "Yesterday's Dream".

Vancouver radio station Z95.3FM originally discovered Thomas Donovan and play-listed 10 of his songs over a 5-year span (from 1992 to 1997). Other initial supporters included Vancouver's LG73 radio and Seattle's dance station C89.5FM. Top-40 radio support in both Vancouver and Seattle became a spring board for Thomas' dance music to jump to other stations and club circuits across the U.S., Canada and abroad.

Thomas mixes human rights and global activism lyrics in his exploration of synth-pop music. Thomas' release "Calling Around the World" is a visual and lyrical call to action, inspired by concern for environmental issues and the greater human condition. Thomas directed, edited and produced the first history documentary of Vancouver's LGBT community. Thomas' support for human rights and same sex marriage is reflected in his musical and video works, as demonstrated in his sexually and politically charged dance-pop dynamo titled "What Our Love Is Made Of".

"He had a big hit in the '90s with "Total Controller" and Thomas Donovan is still playing in the same electronica pop/dance sandbox. The biggest hook on a pretty hooky song is that insistent beat holding all the swirly stuff together, kinda disco with computers. " – John P. McLaughlin – Vancouver Province Newspaper

== Discography ==
- 1993: Digital Dreams
- 1995: Trance
- 1998: One Moment To Fly
- 2006: The Lonely Show
- 2008: Xtended.dance
- 2009: Alternative Mixes
