= Lights Below =

Canadian post-hardcore band

- Origin: Burnaby, British Columbia, Canada
- Genre: Post-Hardcore
- Years active: 2003–present
- Label: Torque Records
- Members: Tristan Federico; Greg Dion; Sean Jackson; Keenan Federico; Taylor Grant
- Past members: Ian MacDonald
- Website: lightsbelow

Lights Below were a post-hardcore band from Burnaby, British Columbia.

== History ==
Lights Below started as a high-school cover band in 2003. They soon became bored of playing covers, and tried their hand at original material. After writing a few songs and playing a few shows, then drummer Ian MacDonald parted ways and was replaced by Taylor Grant. After recording a four-song demo, they began touring, playing shows with bands such as The Fullblast and Moneen. In 2004, they enlisted a second guitarist, Sean Jackson. Now a five-piece, they hit the studio once again to record their latest material. Completing a 6-song EP, they released it in April 2005.

The band spent most of 2006 writing new songs, and recorded "She Teaches Defeat" in 7 days in April, 2007 in the middle of a 4-month North American tour. While on tour in Kearney, Nebraska, the band signed a deal with Canadian indie label Torque Recording Company. Torque would release "She Teaches Defeat" across Canada in September of that year, and the band would continue touring through the year.

Over the years, the band built themselves a touring resume consisting of numerous self booked and promoted Canadian tours, as well as two separate U.S. tours. They shared the stage with the likes of Thirty Seconds to Mars, Senses Fail, Bury Your Dead, Vanna, Love Hate Hero, Damiera, The Used, Aiden, Chiodos, Saosin, Farewell To Freeway, Bless The Fall, Protest The Hero, Greeley Estates, Set Your Goals, Moneen, My American Heart, Eyes Set To Kill, A Skylit Drive, Stutterfly, The Bleeding Alarm, A Textbook Tragedy, Daggermouth, Mutemath, Cartel, Ten Second Epic, Zebrahead - and earning appearances on The Vans Warped Tour in 2006 and The Taste Of Chaos Tour in 2007.

On December 1, 2008 the band announced it had broken up.

== Discography ==
=== Albums ===
- She Teaches Defeat (2007)
- The Lights Below EP (2005)

=== Demos ===
- 2006
  - Whisp of Business (Gentlemen, You Can't Fight in Here, This is the War Room)*
  - No Punching Bears (Everybody in 1955 Was On Fire)*
  - Johnny Mo (Here's Looking at You, J-Mo)*
  - The Crystal Brawl*
  - Set It To Grillage (The Crowsnest)
  - Jaguar Shark

* Released on Myspace

- 2004
  - Your New Favourite Word
  - Fallible
  - Blue Through the Blood
  - Dead Lights On Duthie
- 2003
  - The First Night of Rain
  - Blue Through the Blood
