= The Ballantynes =

- Origin: Vancouver, British Columbia, Canada
- Genres: garage, gospel, soul
- Members: Jarrod Odell – Keys, Guitar, Vocals; Vanessa Dandurand – Vocals; Jennifer Wilks – Keys, Vocals; Corey Poluk – Guitar, Vocals; Max Sample – Bass, Vocals; Michael McDiarmid – Drums; Jonny Grayston – Mascot
- Website: Official Site

The Ballantynes are a 60s-inspired, six piece, garage/soul/rock and roll band based in East Vancouver, BC.

== Music ==
The band met when they all reached for the same Fred Perry polo shirt at Harry Rosen in Vancouver, Canada. They all went to Jonny Grayston's house and reenacted The Who's rock opera Quadrophenia. Subsequently, they decided to form a band through the long running Jonny Grayston Presents East Van Soul Club of which Jarrod O'Dell was a DJ for. Their first full length LP 'Dark Drives, Life Signs' was released on August 7, 2015 and produced by Felix Fung of Little Red Sounds via La Ti Da Records. The music video for 'My Place Your Town' was filmed by director Megan-Magdalena and starred Vancouver-based model, Cate Dunk. The Ballantynes have opened for soul and garage heavyweights like Lee Fields & The Expressions, Reigning Sound, The Oblivians, King Dude, and Roky Erickson.

== Discography ==
- Downtown (Single) (2018)
- Villain (Single) (2018)
- Dark Drives, Life Signs, (2015)
- Liquor Store Gun Store Pawn Shop Church EP, (2013)
- Faith/Velvet, (2013)
- Misery/Stay, (2012)
- The Message/The Railtown Abbey, (2011)
