= Italian Cultural Centre Vancouver =

Cultural centre in Vancouver, British Columbia

Coordinates: 49.2567°N 123.0499°W

The Italian Cultural Centre (Il Centro) is located at 3075 Slocan Street, in East Vancouver, Canada, on Slocan Street at Grandview Highway. The centre is noted to host a bar, multiple classrooms and various groups. Anna Foschi Ciampolini, as the coordinator, organized the conference at the centre that founded the Association of Italian-Canadian Writers. At its gate is a welded sculpture called Pagan by Italian sculptor Severino Trinca.

== History ==
The Italian Cultural Centre's beginnings are in 1974 when the Consul General of Italy, Giovanni Germano, met with the Premier of British Columbia, Dave Barrett. In the Provincial Legislature the Premier represented the riding of Vancouver-Hastings, an area heavily inhabited by Canadians of Italian origin. The Premier was well aware of the wish of the Italian community and he therefore challenged Consul Germano to find the support and turn the dream into a reality. Premier Barrett assured Consul Germano that a grant from the B.C. Government would be available. At Vancouver City Hall, Mayor Art Phillips, also well aware of the wish of the Italian community, indicated to Consul Germano the possibility of obtaining city land at a special price. The land had already been chosen: an 8-acre (32,000 m^{2}) city dump in the heart of Vancouver East.

Both the Provincial Government and the City of Vancouver kept their promise. In order to draw a wider participation of members, a Federation of Italian Associations was formed on a Canadian legal basis: the Italian Folk Society, later to become the Italian Cultural Centre Society. The original societies pertaining to the Federation were the following: Associazione Nazionale Alpini, Circolo Abruzzese, Coro Italiano della British Columbia, Famee Furlane, Famiglia Bagnolese, Italian Canadian Rod & Gun Club, Italian Mutual Aid Society, Molisana Society, Selva del Montello, Sicilian Club, Società Culturale Vicentini, St. Jude Italian Society and Tuscany Cultural Society. These 13 were the founding societies. Today there are 37 societies affiliated to the Italian Cultural Centre.

=== Opening 1977 ===
On September 24, 1977, the Italian Cultural Centre officially opened its doors. The former city dump became an address in Vancouver where the Italian community could gather with the aim to preserve, develop and express Italian culture and language.

Il Centro functions as an orientation and service centre for incoming Italian immigrants as well as a community centre for the Italian-Canadian community.

The centre's services are a restaurant, museum, library, banquet hall, daycare centre, television production centre and an indoor bocce court. Every summer in June the centre hosts a week-long Italian festival called Italian Week.

As part of their initiatives to preserve Italian Culture for not only the Italian community, but to promote Italian culture in Vancouver. This is done through offering Italian language classes for young and old, fine art exhibitions, wine tastings, cooking classes, Literary events, and the organization of Italia day on Commercial Drive and Il Mercato in order to showcase Italian culture and Italian business in Vancouver.

In 1977 "The Drive" (Commercial Drive) between Venables and 12th Avenue was very much a "Little Italy" with mainly Italian cafes and restaurants. By 1997 it was noted that the area had become ethnically more diverse though The Italian Cultural Centre was still the hub of a thriving Italian community.

== Facilities ==
The center includes many facilities for the community, including:

- Multiple classrooms/dance rooms (used for their Italian school, pageant rehearsals, association meetings, culinary courses and other courses)
- Italian speaking childcare (for those 2.5 yrs to kindergarten, the childcare uses the Reggio Emilia approach to childcare)
- Il Museo (museum)
- A trattoria
- A Grand Ballroom
- 2 Piazzas (one in the center joining the 3 buildings as in classic Italian city planning, and one other piazza on the side)
- A bar
- La biblioteca (library)
- An indoor turf field

Almost all of the above spaces are available for rent or use by the community. Some may require a membership with the Italian Cultural Center.

== Il Museo ==
The Italian Cultural Centre, Vancouver also houses a museum called Il Museo. The mission of Il Museo is to be a living narrative of the contributions of pioneer and contemporary Italians and their institutions in Vancouver and beyond. Il Museo at the Italian Cultural Centre in Vancouver tells the varied and vibrant stories of Italians in the Lower Mainland of British Columbia from 1890 to the present day. The Museum's curator is Angela Clarke.

In June, Il Museo will host an exhibition of renowned Italian-Canadian architect Bruno Freschi.

== Redevelopment proposal 2017 ==
Leading up to 2017 a redevelopment was proposed where three new buildings would be connected through piazzas and atriums, replacing the parking lot with underground parking. The proposal is still in discussion.
