= Vancouver Cantata Singers =

The Vancouver Cantata Singers (VCS) is an auditioned Canadian choir in Vancouver, British Columbia, founded in 1959 by organist and conductor Hugh McLean.

Vancouver Cantata Singers was first formed under the name the Philharmonic Choir in 1958 as a non-auditioned community chorus. The first performance took place on February 6, 1959, at Christ Church Cathedral with the choir performing Bach’s Mass in B Minor. Positive reviews from music critics and successful appearances on CBC Radio eventually inspired the chorus to become an auditioned semi-professional ensemble in the early 1970s when James Fankhauser began to lead the group, winning the Healey Willan Grand Prize in 1984 and a Juno Award nomination for Best Classical Album (Vocal or Choral Performance) in 1994. From 2002 to 2012, the choir was headed by conductor Eric Hannan, who led the group to win the Healey Willan Grand Prize both in 2008 and 2011. In 2013, long-time VCS member Paula Kremer became artistic director, and in 2019 she led the group to several awards in the National Competition for Canadian Amateur Choirs, again including Canada Council's Healey Willan Prize.

Although the ensemble's name implies focus on music of the Baroque period, the Vancouver Cantata Singers also perform contemporary music, working frequently with local Canadian composers such as Jocelyn Morlock, Peter Hannan, Kristopher Fulton, Imant Raminsh, Stephen Chatman, Jordan Nobles, Craig Galbraith, and they also perform pieces arranged by members of the choir.

== Conductors ==
2013–present: Paula Kremer

2002–2012: Eric Hannan

2001-2002: Peter Butterfield

1995-2000: Tony Funk, Assistant Conductor - Associate Conductor, 2000/2001

1973-2000: James Fankhauser

1966-1973: John Wiebe

1957-1966: Hugh McLean

== Composers in residence ==
2018–present: Craig Galbraith

2014–2017: Kristopher Fulton

== Recordings ==
- Christmas Reprise XVIII (2021)
- Kristopher Fulton: The Twilight Cities (2015)
- Rethink Forever (with musica intima, works by Peter Hannan), Winner of the Western Canadian Music Awards Outstanding Classical Recording 2011 (2011)
- Vancouver Cantata Singers 50 (2011)
- A Christmas Reprise (2005)
- Rheinberger: Sacred Music, Vol. 5 (1999)
- A 1640 Venetian Mass (1998)
- Venetian Vespers of 1640 - 1994 Juno Award Nominee; Association of Canadian Choral Conductor's 1994 National Choral Award: Outstanding Choral Recording (1994)

== Awards and honours ==
2019: National Competition for Canadian Amateur Choirs

- Winner of the Canada Council for the Arts Healey Willan Prize
- First Place: Mixed-Voice Adult category
- Second Place: Contemporary category
- Best Performance of A Canadian Work in Any Category

2011: National Competition for Canadian Amateur Choirs

- Winner of the Healey Willan Grand Prize
- First Place: Chamber Choir category

2010: National Competition for Canadian Amateur Choirs

- First Place: Contemporary category

2008: National Competition for Canadian Amateur Choirs

- Winner of the Healey Willan Grand Prize
- First Place: Chamber Choir category

1984: CBC National Radio Competition for Amateur Choirs

- Winner of the Healey Willan Grand Prize

1994: Juno Nominee Best Classical Album (Vocal or Choral Performance), Venetian Vespers of 1640

== Collaborations ==
=== Spinal Chord ===
From 2009 to 2016, Vancouver Cantata Singers and the International Collaboration on Repair Discoveries held collaborative annual fundraisers ("Spinal Chord") to benefit spinal cord research and the arts through both non-profit organizations. The choir routinely performs at the Blusson Spinal Cord Centre at Vancouver General Hospital as a part of their relationship with ICORD.

=== Early Music Vancouver ===
Vancouver Cantata Singers regularly collaborates with Early Music Vancouver, performing large-scale works with baroque orchestra including Handel's Theodora, Coronation Anthems, and Messiah.
