= Red Gate Arts Society =

Non-profit based in Vancouver, British Columbia

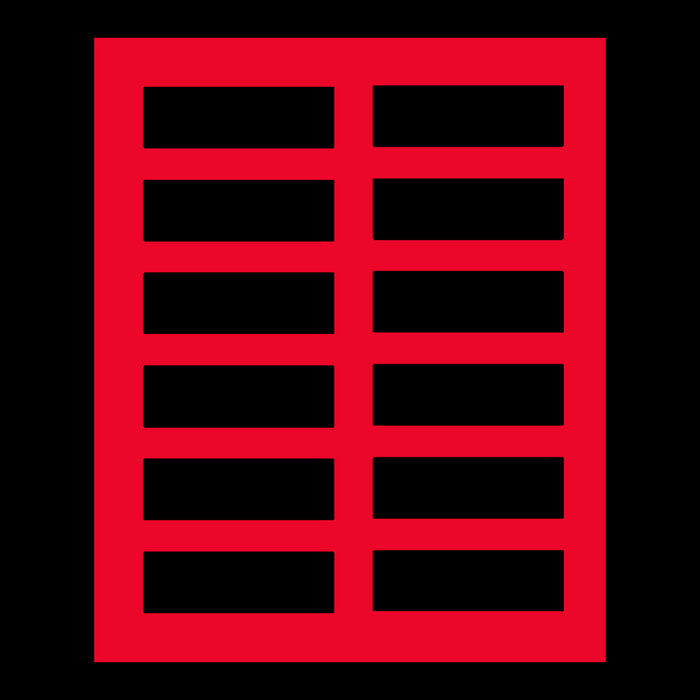
- Red Gate Arts Society logo
- Founded: 1984; 42 years ago
- Founder: Jim Carrico; Anarose Carrico
- Type: Nonprofit organization, music venue
- Headquarters: 1965 Main Street
- Location: Vancouver, British Columbia, Canada
- Coordinates: 49.2677079°N 123.1010370°W
- Website: https://redgate.tv

Red Gate Arts Society is a non-profit based in Vancouver, British Columbia, that provides working space and performance venues to artists and musicians.

== History ==
Red Gate was founded in 1984 by Jim Carrico. Since then it has operated a number of spaces, often being forced to move due to rising rent and permitting issues. The New Pornographers recorded at the Red Gate Arts Society recording studio on West Hastings Street for over seven years. Other musical groups such as Destroyer and the Rodney Graham band also used the studio.

In 2011, the City of Vancouver ordered Red Gate to vacate its venue on West Hastings Street after a building inspection. In 2012, Red Gate began operating as a non-profit. From 2013 to 2018, the organization was based at 885 E Hastings, until it was forced to leave due to the property being redeveloped. Red Gate has also hosted several iterations of Alley Fest, an annual one-day music festival showcasing artists who regularly use the space.

In January 2020, Red Gate once again faced eviction due to a significant increase in property taxes. The next month, the City of Vancouver provided a one-time grant of $27,000 to support the organization's operations. In 2025, the organization received additional arts funding from the city. As of 2026, Red Gate is based at 1965 Main Street, where it operates a performance space, artist studios, a tattoo shop, a screen printing shop, and a gallery.
