= The Belle Game =

Canadian indie pop band

Belle Game
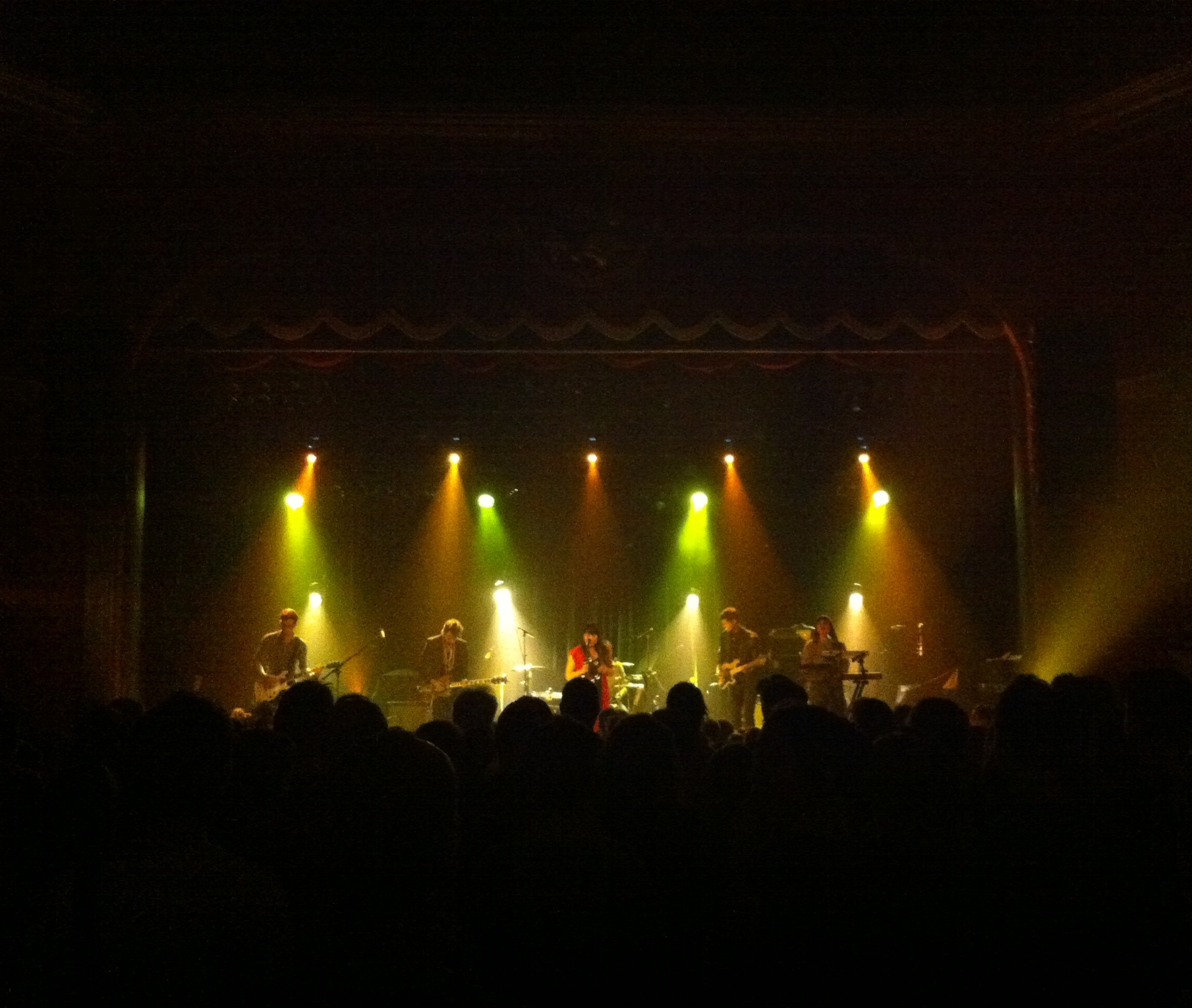
- The Belle Game opening for Bahamas and Family of the Year at the Imperial during Festival d'été de Québec in Quebec City, QC on July 11, 2013.

Background information
- Origin: Vancouver, British Columbia, Canada
- Genres: Indie, Pop, Rock
- Years active: 2009–2020
- Labels: Boompa Records, Arts & Crafts Productions, Bella Union
- Members: Adam Nanji; Andrea Lo; Katrina Jones; Alex Andrew; Ian Cook; Andrew Lee; Rob Chursinoff
- Website: thebellegame.com (defunct)

The Belle Game, aka Belle Game, was an indie pop band originating from Vancouver, British Columbia and active from 2009 to 2020. Its members were Adam Nanji (guitar), Andrea Lo (lead vocals), and Katrina Jones (keyboards, vocals). Drummer Rob Chursinoff left in 2014; drummer and guitarist Alex Andrew left in 2018. For a short time, bassist Ian Cook and trumpeter Andrew Lee were also part of the band. The name is a play on the literal translation, from German, of Glockenspiel.

== History ==
In the summer of 2009, Adam Nanji, Alex Andrew, and Andrea Lo got together to play a single performance at Vancouver's Railway Club performing Nanji's own solo songs as a trio. Andrew and Nanji had grown up and played music together since elementary school; Nanji and Lo had met in rock band class in high school. As a trio, they saw their potential, creating the Inventing Letters EP, released in late 2009. The EP was well received. It got regular airplay on CBC radio, the song "Tiny Fires" was chosen as Song of the Day by The Province newspaper, and won the Fan Favorite award on CHLG-FM/Shore 104.3FM's Summer Search. The video for "Shoulders & Turns" earned them a feature spot on MuchMusic's The Wedge. Nanji, wanting to perform during his time away from home at McGill University, met Jones, who was soon adopted as a core member shortly after founding in 2009; they added Cook and former Tegan and Sara drummer Rob Chursinoff in 2010 and kept writing. In July 2011, they were part of Summer Live, the festival celebrating Vancouver's 125th birthday.

In 2011, complete with 6 members now, they released their second EP, Sleep to Grow, which was co-produced by David Carswell, and placed in the top-20 for the funding program, the Peak Performance Project. They opened for Gotye, Karkwa and Said the Whale, played the Squamish Valley Music Festival and, in 2011 and 2012, played the Rifflandia Music Festival and were selected to travel across Canada with Tracks on Tracks, a recording project of Green Couch Sessions, CBC Radio and Via Rail.

== Ritual Tradition Habit (2013–2014) ==
The band continued writing and produced a complete album's worth of material; on the advice of Carswell, it was scrapped. They started again, "tried harder", released a 7" vinyl record of the single "Wait Up for You", and, in April 2013, released their debut album Ritual Tradition Habit. Ritual Tradition Habit earned many positive reviews, with Pitchfork giving it a rating of 7.2. "Wait Up For You" was put into rotation on the Vancouver station the Peak 102.7 FM as well as other radio stations across the country. Pitchfork posted "River" as 'Best New Track', and Rolling Stone chose "Blame Fiction" as the track of the day.

The music video for "River" was put into rotation on MuchMusic. It was nominated for the 2014 Prism Prize, and, after making it into the top ten list, won the Audience Award.Pitchfork Media also posted about the music video for "River".

The band attended the Banff Centre for Arts and Creativity's Indie Music Residency in October 2013, where they were mentored by Kevin Drew of Broken Social Scene. They then embarked on their first headlining North American and European tours for 5 weeks and 4 weeks, respectively. They played South by Southwest, Ottawa's CityFolk Festival, and opened for Half Moon Run, Hannah Georgas, Bahamas and Born Ruffians. In November 2013, tour mates Bear Mountain and The Darcys opened for The Belle Game when they headlined at Vancouver's Vogue Theatre.

In September 2013, The Belle Game's song "Tradition" appeared on the season premiere of Grey's Anatomy. "River" appeared on the UK TV series Misfits, and "Blame Fiction" was used in the series Orphan Black.

== Fear/Nothing (2015–2018) ==
In 2015, the band dropped the 'The' from their name. In February 2015, they traveled to Montreal to record their second studio album with producers Kevin Drew and Dave Hamelin (The Stills). The band left their label Boompa, and signed with Arts & Crafts, releasing Fear/Nothing on September 8, 2017. In the interim, they played the WayHome Music & Arts Festival and the Vancouver Folk Music Festival, then went on a tour of North America and Europe.

In January 2018, they released the additional single "Only One"; and in June 2018, their single "Follow". In the spring of 2018, Belle Game went on tour with Broken Social Scene. However, in October 2018, the band supported ex-Smiths guitarist Johnny Marr on the US leg of his tour in support of his third studio album, Call the Comet notably without Andrew on drums.

Months later, Belle Game posted a cryptic instagram post seemingly declaring the end of the band in February 2019, and in May, director Kevan Funk won the Prism Prize for Canadian Music Video of the Year for Belle Game's video Low.

By 2020, the band's website and Facebook page had been taken down. The band announced their official dissolution on Instagram in 2020.

== Discography ==
Albums

- Ritual Tradition Habit (2013), Boompa
- Fear/Nothing (2017), Arts & Crafts

EPs

- Inventing Letters EP (2009)
- Sleep to Grow EP (2011), Independent

Singles

- "Wait Up for You" (2013)
- "Only One" (2018)
- "Follow" (2018)

== See also ==
- Canadian rock
- List of bands from British Columbia
- List of bands from Canada
