= George Clarke Chandler =

George Clarke Chandler (March 18, 1906, in Ontario – April 20, 1964, in Vancouver, BC) founded radio station CJOR in Vancouver, BC in 1926 which played a major role in West Coast North American Broadcasting producing music shows and radio dramas. In 1933, the station changed its frequency to 600 AM and location to the basement of the Grosvenor Hotel both of which remained the same for more than 50 years. The station hosted talent that included Jack Webster, Pat Burns, Dick Diespecker, Fletcher Markle, John Drainie, Alan Young and Arthur Hill. The latter two became Hollywood movie stars.
