= Lichtman's =

Canadian bookstore chain

Lichtman's, officially known as Lichtman's News and Books, was a Canadian chain of independent bookstores and newsstands based in Toronto, Ontario. The business traced its origins to 1909, when Samuel "Sammy" Lichtman, a former Toronto newsboy, established a newsstand at the corner of Queen Street and Bay Street. Lichtman's later developed into a chain selling books and specializing in newspapers and magazines from Canada and around the world.

The original Lichtman stores were sold during the 1930s, but one newsstand continued under the Lichtman's name at Bay and Temperance streets and was purchased by Moe Ruby in 1968. Ruby sold the business to his son Gerry Ruby in 1973, who expanded it from a single store into a nine-store Toronto chain with annual sales of approximately $12 million by the late 1990s. Lichtman's filed for bankruptcy protection in March 2000 and ceased operations later that year.

== History ==
=== Samuel Lichtman ===
The business was founded by Samuel "Sammy" Lichtman, a Jewish immigrant from Galicia who came to Toronto as a teenager from the Austro-Hungarian Empire. He initially worked as a bootblack before becoming a newsboy, selling morning newspapers outside Toronto's General Post Office and evening papers at Yonge and King streets.

Lichtman saved much of his income and invested in Toronto real estate. In 1909, he established a newsstand at the corner of Queen and Bay streets. By 1911, he had opened the first of what became four newspaper and magazine stores. None of the four original stores occupied the locations later used by the modern Lichtman's chain.

The stores specialized in newspapers and periodicals from outside Toronto. Reflecting the city's growing immigrant population, Lichtman's became known for supplying publications from customers' home towns and countries. The business advertised this service with the slogan, "Name your city, and we have your home paper".

By the early 1930s, Lichtman had also become an important newspaper and magazine distributor. He served as the exclusive distributor of the Toronto tabloid Hush and operated a national distribution network in which bundles of publications were shipped to provincial sub-agents, who supplied local retailers. In western Canada, for example, Lichtman worked with the Winnipeg-based Imperial News Company, which distributed publications through hundreds of retail outlets in Manitoba and other western provinces.

Lichtman was also involved in Toronto's tabloid-publishing industry. During the 1930s he worked with printer Hanmer Burt Lloyd, whose Sovereign Press was involved in the city's tabloid trade. By 1937, Lloyd and Lichtman were proprietors of Newsdealer's Publishing Company, and in 1938 they launched the weekly tabloid Flash, a competitor to Hush.

=== Transition to the Ruby family ===
During the Great Depression, Lichtman sold his stores one by one and moved into other business ventures. Only one store, near Temperance and Bay streets, retained the Lichtman's name.

That store passed through several owners before being purchased from Ira Ruderman in 1968 by Moe Ruby. Ruby had previously been the publisher of the Toronto scandal newspaper Hush, while his brother Louis "Lou" Ruby had published Flash.

In 1973, Moe Ruby sold Lichtman's to his son Gerry Ruby. Gerry expanded the business during the 1970s and 1980s from a single store into a chain of nine Toronto locations. According to a 1997 profile in The Globe and Mail, the company had recorded a profit in every year since 1976 and eventually reached annual sales of approximately $12 million.

In 1982, Ruby opened a Lichtman's store across the street from the World's Biggest Bookstore, then one of Toronto's earliest large-format bookstores. Despite concerns that the location would be unable to compete with the much larger store, the Lichtman's branch became one of the chain's consistently profitable locations.

=== Expansion and specialization ===
Under the Ruby family, Lichtman's became particularly known for its extensive selection of books, newspapers and magazines. Its stores combined mainstream books with imported newspapers, specialty magazines and harder-to-find publications, and sought to cultivate what Gerry Ruby described as a more intimate, customer-oriented atmosphere than larger competitors.

The stores were relatively small. By 1997, a typical Lichtman's location occupied approximately 2,000 square feet (190 m²), roughly one-fifth the size of a typical Chapters outlet. Locations included stores at Bayview Village Shopping Centre, on Yonge Street, and in Toronto's downtown shopping districts.

In 1990, the Ontario Historical Society recognized Ruby and Lichtman's for the design of the company's storefront at 842 Yonge Street.

By the early 1990s, Ruby had become concerned that the rapid growth of large-format bookstores would threaten smaller independents. He visited large bookstores in New York, including Barnes & Noble, to study their operations and concluded that Lichtman's could not replicate amenities such as coffee bars because of the smaller size of its stores.

Instead, the company began modernizing its internal operations. Starting in 1993, Lichtman's spent approximately $250,000 over several years installing a computerized inventory and sales system. The system allowed managers to track the number of copies of individual titles held at each store and adjust purchasing accordingly.

The chain also adopted selected marketing practices used by larger competitors. It reduced its inventory of hardcover books by approximately 20 per cent, introduced a frequent-buyers program, launched a quarterly customer newsletter and renovated several stores. By 2000, the chain carried more than 300 newspaper titles and approximately 5,000 magazines.

== Competition, decline and closure ==
The arrival of large-format bookstores had a measurable effect on Lichtman's before the end of the 1990s. When an Indigo store opened at Yonge and Eglinton in December 1997, Ruby said customer traffic at a nearby Lichtman's declined and sales fell by more than 10 per cent during the first week, a pattern he said was also occurring at branches located near other large bookstores.

The new chains also competed with Lichtman's for employees. In 1997, Indigo hired away Lichtman's longtime head book buyer, while Ruby said other members of his staff had also been approached by competitors.

Ruby nevertheless rejected the idea of transforming Lichtman's into a large-format bookstore, arguing that competing directly with the chains on size would eliminate the qualities that distinguished the business. He instead sought to maintain Lichtman's as a smaller specialist retailer with strong customer service, while acknowledging that survival would become increasingly difficult if customers shifted primarily to large-format stores.

During the four years preceding 2000, Lichtman's annual revenues declined from $13.5 million to $9 million. The company attempted to counter falling sales by emphasizing specialty publications, but the strategy was unsuccessful. Gerry Ruby also attributed declining demand for parts of the company's traditional newspaper and magazine business to the growth of the Internet, which made information that had once required specialized publications increasingly accessible online.

The company was further affected by the expansion of Chapters. Lichtman's was refused a renewal of its lease at Bayview Village after the landlord agreed that a new Chapters outlet would be the shopping centre's only bookstore.

In March 2000, Lichtman's filed for bankruptcy protection under the Bankruptcy and Insolvency Act. Ruby attributed the company's difficulties to competition from big-box booksellers such as Chapters and Indigo, as well as online retailers such as Amazon.

The company ceased operations in 2000, ending more than 90 years of businesses operating under the Lichtman name.
