= John Gilbert (broadcaster) =

John Gilbert (14 September 1930 – 14 September 1998) was a Canadian radio broadcaster.

== Early life, family and education ==
Gilbert was raised in the Cabbagetown section of Toronto before running away from home to join a carnival when he was 13 years old.

== Career ==
He began his broadcasting career in Cornwall, Ontario at age 17 and hosted his first talk show in Saint John, New Brunswick, around 1966.

Gilbert was a broadcaster with CJCH Halifax, which was acquired by CHUM Limited in 1970. In February 1971, Toronto's 1050 CHUM announced that he would succeed Larry Solway as host of the talk show Speak Your Mind. In 1973, he became the most successful radio talk show host in Canada with 120 000 measured listeners, more than Vancouver media legend Jack Webster. In 1976, Gilbert recorded "No Charge", a cover version of a song also recorded by Melba Montgomery and J. J. Barrie, which charted nationally. Gilbert's term with CHUM ended in 1977.

In 1980, Gilbert hosted Night Talk, a weekday late night program planned as a national talk show. However, the CRTC ordered that the network of stations broadcasting the program be cut back from 13 to the six stations then owned by Maclean-Hunter: CKEY Toronto (host station), CFCN Calgary, CFCO Chatham, CHNS Halifax, CKGL-FM Kitchener, and CKOY Ottawa. A year after it launched, it was also broadcast by CJJD Hamilton, CJBQ Belleville, CJNH Bancroft, CHSC St. Catharines, and CHEX Peterborough. The show ran until 1982, when Gilbert re-joined Night Talk co-creator Taylor Parnaby, who had become station manager of CKO.

== Career ==
- years unknown: CKSF, Cornwall, Ontario
- c. 1962: CHEX, Peterborough, Ontario
- years unknown: CFBC, Saint John, New Brunswick
- ???-1971: CJCH, Halifax
- 1971-1977: CHUM, Toronto
- 1978-1980: CKFH, Toronto
- 1980-1982: CKEY Toronto
- 1982-1986: CKO, Toronto (national radio network)
- 1990s: CKTB, St. Catharines, Ontario

== Discography ==
Chart (1976)	Peak position
Canada RPM Top Singles	55
