= Ritual Tradition Habit =

Studio album by The Belle Game
- Released: April 16, 2013
- Genre: Indie rock, dark pop, rock
- Producer: John Raham and The Belle Game

The Belle Game chronology
Sleep to Grow EP (2011)	Ritual Tradition Habit (2013)

Ritual Tradition Habit is the debut studio album by Canadian band The Belle Game, produced by John Raham (Frazey Ford, The Be Good Tanyas) and the members of The Belle Game. It was released in Canada on April 16, 2013, and in the United States on May 21, 2013.

== Track listing ==
No.	Title	Length
1.	"Ritual"	2:19
2.	"River"	4:20
3.	"Wait Up For You"	4:13
4.	"In Secrets"	4:49
5.	"Wasted Light"	3:42
6.	"Tradition"	1:52
7.	"Bruises to Ash"	4:15
8.	"Blame Fiction"	3:52
9.	"Salt + Water"	2:54
10.	"Keeps Me Up At Night"	3:41
11.	"Little Wars (Causing Your Trouble)"	4:23
12.	"Habit"	1:52

== Reception ==
Ritual Tradition Habit earned The Belle Game positive reviews from many blogs upon its release in April 2013. The first single from the album was “Wait Up For You,” and it was put into rotation on the Vancouver station the Peak 100.5 FM as well as other radio stations across the country, particularly college stations and CBC Radio 3. In April 2013, when The Belle Game released the album in Canada, Rolling Stone chose the track “Blame Fiction” as the track of the day and offered as a free mp3 on its website.

The second single, “River,” was reviewed by Pitchfork Media in July 2013 and posted as a "Best New Track." Just over a week later, Pitchfork reviewed the entirety of Ritual Tradition Habit, giving it a 7.2 overall. The music video for “River” was put into rotation on MuchMusic, and the channel ended up posting the video on Much's 100 Greatest Videos Ever. The video was also nominated for the 2013 Prism Prize, and, after making it into the top ten list, it won the Audience Award.Pitchfork Media also posted about the music video for “River” when it was released.
