= LIU Post =

Private university in Brookville, New York, US

Coordinates: 40.8201°N 73.5969°W

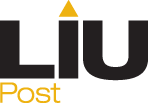
- Motto: Mens Regnum bona possidet "An Honest Heart Is a Kingdom in Itself" (LIU Post); Urbi et Orbi "To the City and the World" or "for the city (Rome) and the world" also "To the city [Rome] and to the globe" --- a blessing of the Pope (Long Island University)
- Type: Private
- Established: 1951; 75 years ago
- President: Kimberly R. Cline
- Faculty: 341 full-time
- Undergraduates: 5,169
- Postgraduates: 3,303
- Location: Brookville, New York, United States
- Campus: Suburban, 307.9 acres (1.246 km^{2})
- Nickname: Sharks
- Sporting affiliations: NCAA Division I
- Website: www.liu.edu/post

LIU Post, formally the C.W. Post Campus of Long Island University and often referred to as C.W. Post, is a private university in Brookville, New York, United States. Located on Long Island, it is part of Long Island University (LIU), and the largest school in the LIU system.

== History ==
The campus was originally named after C.W. Post, father of Marjorie Merriweather Post, who sold her Long Island estate known as "Hillwood" to Long Island University in 1951 for $200,000 ($2,480,769 today). "Hillwood" was built 30 years earlier and shares a title with her Washington D.C. Estate. Three years after acquiring the property, LIU renamed it C.W. Post College in honor of Post's father.

== Campus ==
LIU Post is located on 307 acres (1.24 km^{2}) of rolling hills in Brookville, New York, on Long Island's North Shore. The area is sometimes datelined as Greenvale, because there is no "Brookville" post office, and the school is in the zip code that is served by the Greenvale post office, which is to the west. Greenvale station is the nearest Long Island Rail Road station.

On the property, numerous historic estates have been repurposed for various uses. Adjoining "Hillwood," Adelaide Breevort Close's residence (constructed a few years after Marjorie Post's mansion), is now the admissions office. Similarly, the J. Randolph Robinson residence is now Bush-Brown Hall, "Hutfield" is now used for an arts building, and "Mariemont" is now Hutton Hall.

Humanities Hall and Life Sciences/Pell Hall are the main educational buildings on campus, and house most of the core curriculum classes. Classes are also held in Hoxie Hall, Roth Hall, Lorber Hall, the Theater Film and Dance building, Sculpture Studio, Crafts Center, Fine Arts Center, B. Davis Schwartz Memorial Library, and the Kahn Discovery Center.

The Tilles Center for the Performing Arts is on the west side of the campus. Previously known as the Bush-Brown Concert Theater (named for the longtime Long Island University chancellor Dr. Albert Bush-Brown), the Tilles Center has hosted many musical and theatrical events.

The Hillwood Commons serves as the student activities center, and also houses several administrative offices, including financial aid and bursars office, as well as the Promise office which handles all student day-to-day activities (classes, student organizations, housing, etc). Hillwood has a study lounge, commuter lounge, recreation lounge, and TV lounge (located on opposite sides of the two-story building) that are open as long as Hillwood is open. The Hillwood Cafe, Subway, and Starbucks are all located here and serve as the main dining areas, along with the Winnick Student Center serving as the single dining hall on campus for residential students.

The Hillwood Commons serves as a meeting area for resident and commuter students to get to know each other through informal association outside of the classroom. The Hillwood Commons area also houses the Campus Concierge, Hillwood Computer Lab, Hillwood Cinema, School Bookstore, and multiple student run businesses, such as Browse (electronics store), The Student Body Collective (Clothing boutique), and Sharknation (merchandise shop).

The university's C.W. Post Interfaith Chapel is home of the Interfaith Center, which provides both religious services as well as partnerships with community organizations. The chapel was first conceived in 1968 by Bradley Delehanty and completed by the noted Long Island architectural firm Alfred Shaknis and Peter S. van Bloem in the classic Jeffersonian style Georgian architecture design as a tribute to all religious faiths. Included among its notable architectural features are a domed rotunda at the main sanctuary, as well as soaring Doric columns at the main entrance which call to mind the ancient Roman Pantheon.

== Academics ==
Academic rankings

National
- Forbes: 370
- U.S. News & World Report: 369

LIU Post offers undergraduate and graduate programs in the following colleges and schools:

- College of Communications, Art, and Design
- College of Liberal Arts and Sciences
- College of Management
- College of Education, Information and Technology
- School of Health Professions and Nursing
- Lewyt College of Veterinary Medicine

== Student life ==
LIU Post is located about 25 miles (40 km) east from New York City. Students at the university predominantly come from eastern Long Island, New York City, and the New York metropolitan area, and there are a smaller number of students from elsewhere in the nation and from foreign nations. The university has eight Greek Life organizations on campus.

== Athletics ==
Long Island University's athletic teams are known as the LIU Sharks. They compete in the National Collegiate Athletic Association at the Division I level, the highest level of collegiate athletics. Prior to 2019, the university's athletic programs competed at the Division II level. The programs are governed by the NCAA, the Eastern College Athletic Conference (ECAC), the East Coast Conference (ECC), and the Northeast-10 Conference (NE-10). Prior to 2019, the two LIU campuses had two athletics teams, C.W. Post had the LIU Post Pioneers, and competed in Division II. The LIU campus in Brooklyn competed at the Division I level as the Blackbirds.

In July 2019, the two campuses merged their two athletics teams into a single unit competing in Division I, and assumed the name LIU Sharks.

In addition to its NCAA-sanctioned athletic programs, students may participate in various sports, including basketball, racquetball, swimming, and volleyball, for leisure at the Pratt Recreation Center. There is a fitness center for aerobic and cardiovascular workouts on the campus. The athletic fields and courts are used for recreational baseball, football, soccer, softball, and tennis.

== Notable faculty ==
- T. K. Blue, leader of the jazz band
- Bob Brier, Egyptologist and mummy specialist
- Paul Kim, musician

== Notable alumni ==
- Rocky Aoki, founder of Benihana restaurants
- A.J. Benza, TV show host and actor
- Penny Budoff, physician and women's health expert
- Frank Catalanotto, baseball player
- Dave Cohen, '88; final head college football coach for Hofstra University
- Ray Dalio, founder of Bridgewater Associates investment firm
- Ted David, CNBC anchor
- Janet DiFiore, former Chief Judge of the New York Court of Appeals
- Mike Gange, of The Howard Stern Show
- Joe Gatto, comedian, executive producer of Impractical Jokers, owner Gatto Pups And Friends
- Charles J. Gradante, hedge fund expert
- Alan Hahn, MSG Network studio analyst, co-host of daily ESPN Radio sports talk show
- Jackee Harry, actress
- Bunny Hoest, cartoonist of The Lockhorns comic strip
- Ernie Hudson Jr., actor
- Al Kahn, former chairman and CEO of 4Kids Entertainment and university board member
- Jamie Kellner, chairman and CEO of Turner Broadcasting System
- Brian Kilmeade, television personality
- Perry Klein, football player
- Ed Lauter, actor
- John Leguizamo, actor
- Bruce Lipton, developmental biologist
- Lynda Lopez, anchorwoman
- Howard Lorber, chief executive officer of Nathan's Famous
- Dina Meyer, actress
- Jorge M. Pérez, billionaire Miami-based real estate developer
- Julie Ann Sageer, TV host and chef
- Richie Scheinblum (1942–2021), Major League Baseball All-Star outfielder
- Terry Semel, chairman and CEO of Yahoo!
- Peter Senerchia, wrestler and commentator
- Ronald Spadafora, FDNY chief
- Ralph V. Suozzi, mayor of Glen Cove, New York
- Michael Tucci, actor
- Larry Wachtel, the "Voice of Wall Street"; a senior vice president and market analyst at Prudential Securities, Inc., and respected financial markets commentator on WINS (AM) radio in New York City
- Gary Wichard, footballer and sports agent
- Gary Winnick, financier
