= Ted Tevan =

- Born: Theodore "Oral" Tevan; 1 March 1933; Kingston, Ontario, Canada
- Died: 12 August 2011 (aged 78); Montreal, Quebec, Canada
- Presenting career
- Show: Sports Rap
- Station: CFOX
- Show: Various series
- Stations: CKO, CFMB, CIQC, CKGM
- Country: Canada

Theodore "Ted" Tevan (1 March 1933 – 12 August 2011) was a Canadian sports radio broadcaster.

Born in Kingston, Ontario, Tevan moved to Montreal in 1965 initially working in radio advertising. His career remained based in that city except for a short-lived sports talk show on the Toronto-based CKO in early 1989, and from then until 1991 at CKWW in Windsor, Ontario.

His first radio program was Sports Rap on Montreal's 1470 CFOX radio station, considered a key pioneering effort towards the development of sports radio in Canada. Tevan established a reputation as a radio maverick, often verbally jousting with his listeners and, in some cases, kicking them off the air with a jubilant "You're gone!"

Outside his broadcasting career, Tevan served as a defence witness in 2001 during the incest trial of boxing champion Dave Hilton, Jr.

In January 2000, Tevan began a late night Tuesdays and Thursdays on CFMB 1280 shortly after his previous show on AM 940 (then CIQC) was cancelled due to a format change. He previously hosted shows on the 600 frequency when it was known as CFCF (CFMB).

Tevan hosted a late night sports programme on The Team 990.

On 11 August 2011, Tevan fell at his residence in Notre-Dame-de-Grâce, fracturing his hip. The following day, he died from heart failure after an operation to repair the hip. A tribute on Team 990 was planned for the following Tuesday.
