= Elwood Glover's Luncheon Date =

- Genre: Talk show
- Presented by: Elwood Glover
- Country of origin: Canada
- Original language: English

Production
- Running time: 60 minutes

Original release
- Network: CBC Television
- Release: 1963 – 1975

Elwood Glover's Luncheon Date is a Canadian talk show that aired on CBC Television from 1963 to 1975.

Elwood Glover had hosted noon-time programming on CBC Radio since 1956. A new studio was set up at the Four Seasons Hotel, near the CBC broadcast headquarters on Jarvis Street in Toronto. The following year, Luncheon Date made its CBC television debut while the audio portion was simultaneously broadcast on CBC Radio. Luncheon Date featured Leon Mangoff as announcer and sidekick.

Glover announced in February 1975 that he would leave the programme, after conducting more than 10 000 interviews. Glover had worked for the CBC a total of 37 years at that point, but wanted to continue with the CBC in a less intensive role. Glover left the CBC on 1 June 1975 for a weekend host job at CKEY radio. The CBC began a new noon-time talk show program in September 1975, the Bob McLean Show.
