= CFOX =

CFOX may refer to:

- CFOX-FM, a radio station (99.3 FM) licensed to Vancouver, British Columbia, Canada
- CFOX (AM), a defunct radio station (1470 AM) formerly licensed to Pointe-Claire, Quebec, Canada
