= Leon Mangoff =

Canadian radio and television announcer and broadcaster

Leon Mangoff (April 1, 1931 – June 2, 2000) was a Canadian radio and television announcer and broadcaster best known as the host of Elwood Glover's Luncheon Date.

Mangoff worked as a CBC TV and radio announcer during the 1960s and 1970s. Probably best known as TV announcer, he was also involved as a puppeteer in the CHCH TV program Albert J. Steed hosted by Bill Lawrence between 1962 and 1967.

As a sidekick on the noon-time talk-show Elwood Glover's Luncheon Date, Mangoff gained his widest exposure across Canada. Mangoff reportedly once spent an entire show swimming laps in a hotel pool.
