= Sleep to Grow =

EP by The Belle Game
- Released: October 1, 2011
- Genre: Indie, pop, rock
- Producer: David Carswell, John Collins

The Belle Game chronology
Inventing Letters (2009)	Sleep to Grow (2011)	Ritual Tradition Habit (2013)

Sleep to Grow is the second release by Vancouver, British Columbia band The Belle Game, produced by David Carswell and John Collins. It was released digitally on October 1, 2011. Physical copies were made available later the same month.

== Track listing ==
No.	Title	Length
1.	"Sleep to Grow"	3:57
2.	"I Wish You Weren't Like A Dead Lover (Sometimes)"	3:05
3.	"Bloom"	3:47
4.	"Pink Carnations"	4:03
5.	"Wool Pt. II"	2:31

== Reception ==
Similar to their previous EP, Sleep to Grow received positive reviews soon after it was released, especially from blogs. In the spring of 2012, the Vancouver radio station known as the Peak 100.5 FM put the title track of the EP into heavy rotation. Both "Sleep to Grow" as well as the fourth track, "Pink Carnations" have been heard in light rotation on CBC Radio 3.

In April 2011, The Belle Game entered the first single of the EP, "Sleep to Grow" into a radio competition held by the Peak 100.5 FM known as the Peak Performance Project, and the band subsequently made it into the top 20 artists chosen. Though the band did not make the top 5 in the contest, the Peak continues to play The Belle Game's music, and the contest has propelled them into a climb in rotation on CBC Radio 3.

Sleep to Grow even earned the band a spot in the Georgia Straight's list of the "Best Bands of Vancouver" as well as the opening spot for Australia's hit-band Gotye's show at the Vogue Theatre in Vancouver on April 8, 2012.
