= Inventing Letters =

Inventing Letters EP

EP by The Belle Game
- Released: November 10, 2009
- Genre: Indie, folk, pop
- Producer: John Franco

The Belle Game chronology
Inventing Letters EP (2009)	Sleep to Grow EP (2011)

The Inventing Letters EP is the first release by Vancouver, British Columbia band The Belle Game. It was released digitally on November 10, 2009. Physical copies were made available in January 2010, though only 300 of them were manufactured.

== Track listing ==
No.	Title	Length
1.	"Shoulders & Turns"	3:23
2.	"Cocaine Starry Eyes"	4:19
3.	"Inventing Letters (The Suitcase Song)"	5:58
4.	"Tiny Fires"	4:40
5.	"The Belle Game" (Hidden Track)	4:20

== Reception ==
The EP has received numerous positive reviews from across Canada, especially blogs, and it has propelled the band far into the Canadian music scene since its release in 2009. The first track, entitled "Shoulders & Turns", was put into heavy rotation on the Vancouver radio station the Shore 104.3 FM in April 2010 until August 2010, when the fourth track, "Tiny Fires", was put into full rotation on the Shore as the band's second single. "Tiny Fires" is also currently played in light rotation on CBC National Radio.

In June 2010, The Belle Game entered an acoustic version of "Tiny Fires" into a radio competition being held by the Shore 104.3 FM called the Shore Sounds of Summer Song Search, and the band quickly made it into the top 10 finalists. Eventually, in August 2010, the band was awarded the Fan Favourite Award in the contest for having received the most votes for their song entry.
