= CKO =

Former Canadian all-news radio network

- Type: All-news radio network
- Country: Canada
- First air date: 1 July 1977
- Availability: Formerly available in major Canadian markets
- Radio stations: 9 operating stations; 12 licensed
- Radio transmitters: 9 operating transmitters
- Licence area: Canada
- Headquarters: Toronto, Ontario
- Broadcast area: Canada
- Owner: Canada All-News Radio Ltd.; later The CKO Radio Partnership
- Parent: AGRA Industries; later Cybermedix
- Key people: David Ruskin, founding president; Bill Stewart, president at closure
- Dissolved: 10 November 1989
- Format: News/talk
- Callsigns: CKO; CKO-FM-1 to CKO-FM-11
- Language: English

CKO was a Canadian all-news radio network that operated from 1977 to 1989. It was owned by Canada All-News Radio Ltd. and, later, by The CKO Radio Partnership. The network used the shared CKO call sign across a group of owned-and-operated stations in major Canadian markets.

CKO was launched as a privately owned national news service, with a mix of national news, local and regional inserts, public affairs programming, talk shows, business reports and selected sports broadcasts. Nine of its twelve licensed stations were operating when the network shut down on November 10, 1989. The unbuilt stations were licensed for Regina, Saint John and St. John's.

== History ==
=== Licensing and launch ===
On July 12, 1976, the Canadian Radio-television and Telecommunications Commission (CRTC) approved David Ruskin's application, on behalf of a corporation to be incorporated as Canada All-News Radio Ltd., to operate a national network of all-news FM stations. The Canadian Communications Foundation later described the approval of eleven licences to one owner as an unusual move by the CRTC. The CRTC did not approve a new Montreal FM transmitter because of the scarcity of FM frequencies and concerns about the balance of English- and French-language stations in the market; instead, it suggested that the applicant acquire or affiliate with an existing English-language station in Montreal.

The network began broadcasting on July 1, 1977, with stations in Ottawa and Toronto. Its first broadcast included a recorded message from Prime Minister Pierre Trudeau. Ottawa's launch was delayed by power problems, and early newspaper coverage noted technical errors and uneven editorial performance.

Later in 1977, CKO expanded to Montreal by acquiring CFOX in Pointe-Claire and converting it to the all-news format. The network also added stations in London, Calgary and Vancouver that year.

=== Programming and expansion ===
CKO carried a national all-news service with local and regional news inserts. In late 1977, the network began live radio broadcasts of Question Period from the House of Commons of Canada. For many Canadians, this was the first regular live access to House proceedings before the later arrival of nationwide parliamentary television coverage.

The network added Edmonton in 1978. That year, CKO's London bureau was closed because of poor advertising sales. After its first year, CKO was facing lower ratings and higher losses than expected, although management hoped that a promotional campaign and increased Toronto transmitter power would improve its position.

CKO also carried live sports. In late 1978, it began broadcasting Toronto Maple Leafs hockey games and National Football League football. CKFH, which had previously carried Maple Leafs games, asked the CRTC to stop the hockey broadcasts, but the commission rejected the complaint and found that the broadcasts were consistent with CKO's programming commitments.

Following a failed proposed sale to Allarco Broadcasting in 1981, CKO cut staff and reduced local programming, with most stations increasingly rebroadcasting programming from Toronto. In 1985, the network added a station in Halifax.

=== Ownership changes and financial difficulties ===
AGRA Industries was originally a 45 per cent shareholder in Canada All-News Radio Ltd. By the late 1980s, AGRA had effective control of the network through a complex ownership structure involving Cybermedix.

In August 1987, Maclean-Hunter sold its Newsradio broadcast syndication division to CKO.

CKO also pursued technical and ownership changes in an effort to improve its financial position. In 1986, it applied to move its Montreal outlet to 95.1 MHz FM, but the CRTC denied the application in 1987. In 1989, the CRTC approved a separate application to move CKO Montreal from 1470 kHz to 650 kHz and to reduce its authorized power; the change was never implemented before the network closed.

In 1988, CKO applied to exchange frequencies with Toronto AM station CKEY 590. The proposed transaction would have included a $4 million payment to CKO, which the network said would help finance additional stations in Winnipeg, Regina, Saint John and St. John's. The CRTC denied the application on April 25, 1988. Later that year, AGRA transferred its 99 per cent ownership interest in CKO to Cybermedix, its majority-owned media division.

In March 1989, CKO told the CRTC that it expected to stop losing money and break even by 1993. CKO opened its Winnipeg station later that year; it was the final station launched by the network.

=== Closure ===
In 1989, AGRA agreed in principle to sell Cybermedix to Montreal-based broadcaster Cogeco. Cogeco planned to keep CKO and Cybermedix's cable systems while selling the medical laboratory assets. The transaction still required CRTC approval, and Cogeco could not operate CKO before approval was granted.

With losses continuing and the Cogeco transaction still pending, AGRA shut down CKO on November 10, 1989. Network president Bill Stewart informed employees of the closure by conference call. While the meeting was taking place, the network went off the air during the noon Eastern Time newscast. Newspaper reports stated that CKO had lost about $55 million during its existence.

The CKO licences were surrendered to the CRTC, which formally revoked them on August 15, 1990.

== Transmitters ==
City of licence	Call sign	Frequency	First air date	Studio	Reassigned to
Ottawa, Ontario	CKO-FM-1	FM 106.9	July 1, 1977	69 Sparks Street, later 150 Wellington Street	CKQB-FM (relocation from 540 AM)
Toronto, Ontario	CKO-FM-2	FM 99.1	July 1, 1977	65 Adelaide Street East, later 30 Carlton Street (Carlton Inn)	CBLA-FM (relocation from 740 AM)
London, Ontario	CKO-FM-3	FM 97.5	October 21, 1977	380 Ridout Street North	CIQM-FM (relocation from 103.1 FM)
Vancouver, British Columbia	CKO-FM-4	FM 96.1	November 21, 1977	2780 East Broadway	CHKG-FM (new station)
Calgary, Alberta	CKO-FM-5	FM 103.1	November 7, 1977	332 17th Avenue South West, later 5925 Third Street	CFXL-FM (new station)
Edmonton, Alberta	CKO-FM-6	FM 101.9	March 1, 1978	12316 Jasper Avenue	CKER-FM (relocation from 1480 AM; later moved to 101.7)
Winnipeg, Manitoba	CKO-FM-7	FM 99.1	May 1, 1989	unknown	CFPG-FM (new station)
† Regina, Saskatchewan	CKO-FM-8	FM 100.7	n/a	n/a	CILG-FM (new station)
Halifax, Nova Scotia	CKO-FM-9	FM 103.5	January 1, 1985	2000 Barrington Street (Cogswell Tower)	CKHZ-FM (new station)
† Saint John, New Brunswick	CKO-FM-10	FM 99.7	n/a	n/a	never reassigned
† St. John's, Newfoundland and Labrador	CKO-FM-11	FM 101.9	n/a	n/a	CBAX-FM-2 (new station; repeater of CBAX-FM Halifax)
Pointe-Claire / Montreal, Quebec	CKO	AM 1470	September 19, 1977	203 Hymus Blvd, Pointe Claire, later 2085 Union Street, Montreal, later 550 Sherbrooke Street West	never reassigned; unavailable since 2007 as 1450 is used by CHOU

† The stations in Regina, Saint John and St. John's were licensed by the CRTC but had not been launched by the network before its shutdown.

== Studios ==
CKO's main studios and offices were in Toronto. The network was initially based at 59–65 Adelaide Street East, in a vacant six-storey building near the Adelaide Street courthouse. In 1982, the Toronto studios moved to the Carlton Inn at 30 Carlton Street, west of Maple Leaf Gardens.

== Programming ==
Programs and features carried by CKO included:

- The World Tomorrow with Herbert W. Armstrong, broadcast on weekday and Sunday evenings.
- Bookshelf, a book review program hosted by Dawn Draper.
- The John Gilbert Show.
- Hotline, hosted by Pat Burns.
- Nighttalk with Bill Williams, a national talk program from Vancouver.
- Open Portfolio, an Ottawa-based capital affairs program hosted by Noel Norenius.
- People Probe, a national person-in-the-street program hosted by Earl Sky.
- Science File, hosted by Glen Stone.
- Spacewatch, hosted by David Onley.
- This is Business, a daily business program hosted by John MacRae.
- Time to Talk, a national open-line program hosted by Don Gauthier.
- Wall Street Report, hosted by Larry Wachtel.
- Wineview, hosted by Andrew Sharp.
- Toronto Maple Leafs hockey broadcasts.

== Selected staff and contributors ==
People associated with CKO included Pat Burns, Erin Davis, John Gilbert, Elwood Glover, Harvey Kirck, Mitch Melnick, David Onley, Ted Tevan and Larry Wachtel. Tevan briefly hosted a weekday sports talk program on the network in 1989. Although he lived in Montreal, CKO's Montreal station did not have a suitable studio for the program, requiring him to commute to Toronto; he left after the network rejected his proposal to establish a Montreal studio.

Personalities associated with the network included:

- Lowell Thomas - Calgary news presenter
- Barry Aldrich - sports director, co-host of Good Morning Canada
- John Andersen - Anchor/host Toronto, Vancouver
- Greg Bohnert - Calgary news director
- Terry Boland - Senior Parliamentary Reporter, co-host of national morning show
- Abhi M - host
- Ken Anderson - Ottawa editor, reporter and news anchor
- Ed Anderst - Montreal and Parliamentary (Ottawa) reporter
- Bruce Barker - afternoon sports anchor and reporter
- Squire Barnes - Sports director, Vancouver
- Jim Bennie - Vancouver news director and production manager
- Malcolm Bernard - reporter
- Kim Blue - president & GM
- Karen Bodirsky - reporter
- Jane Brown - news and traffic reporter
- Pat Burns - evening host from Vancouver
- Ken Cassavoy - co-host, producer, management
- Jim Chapman - Toronto news
- Jim Connell - Montreal host
- Erin Davis - co-host
- Simon Dingley - news anchor/reporter
- Gerry Dobson
- Susan Flory - reporter Analysis; afternoon drive news anchor; co-host,Cover to Cover magazine
- Norah Fountain - reporter
- George Franks - news anchor
- Blair Gamble - news anchor (1982 - 1984)
- Don Gauthier - host of Time to Talk
- John Gilbert - talk show host, Toronto/Vancouver
- Angus Gillespie - reporter, sports anchor/writer (1987–89)
- Glenn Gingerich - sports director
- Elwood Glover - host, The News in Dimension
- Phil Godin - national news anchor
- Lynne Gordon - entertainment reporter
- Laurie Graham - Vancouver reporter
- Betty Harrison - news anchor
- Steve Hennigar - news anchor
- Brian Hillier - national news anchor
- Robert Holliday - morning news
- Karen Horsman - traffic reporter
- Richard Hustwick - Toronto reporter
- Patrick Hynan - head news writer
- Thierry Jaume - overnight news anchor
- Paul Johnson - Winnipeg bureau, wrote Journal of Radio Studies (1995) article on CKO
- Walter Kanitz - travel correspondent
- Anita Kartalija - Toronto traffic reporter
- Steve Kee - news and sports reporter
- Pamela Kern
- Harvey Kirck - afternoon news, specialty features
- Dave LaFave - sports
- John McGillivray - sports director
- Anne McLaughlin - anchor, reporter
- John MacRae - Sept 1981 - Aug 1988 - desk editor/ business editor-reporter-anchor/national anchor/ host This is Business weeknights
- Bernie McNamee - national anchor
- John Marchesan - sports reporter
- Bob McLean - national afternoon host, 1986
- Mitch Melnick - Montreal sports reporter, 1979
- François (Frank) Meloche - Ottawa reporter, newscaster
- Al Michaels - afternoon host
- Roger Millions
- Jim Morris - Toronto news director, crime reporter
- Lori Miseck - reporter
- Stan Mulholoch - morning host
- Shawn Murray - reporter
- David Onley - technology reports
- Gregory Osoba - reporter
- Taylor "Hap" Parnaby - president
- Rod Pasic - reporter/fill-in anchor
- Arnis Peterson - business anchor
- Bill Pringle - Calgary newsroom coordinator/afternoon host
- Bob Quinn - Calgary news director
- Robert "Bob" Reid - reporter
- Mike Robbins - news
- Bill Roberts - station manager, Montreal, 1979
- Les Roberts - production assistant, Montreal, 1979
- Julie Rosenberg - host, co-host of Good Morning Canada
- Sandy Rubin - Montreal reporter
- Malcolm Scully - Parliament Hill reporter
- Andrew Sharp - wine programme host
- Bill Sipple - news anchor
- Murray Smith - entertainment editor
- Joe Snider - news anchor, Sports anchor, "Sports journal" host, reporter, London Bureau chief
- Brenda Spielman - Edmonton Bureau Chief, News Director, Morning Host
- Al Stafford - producer/writer (Toronto), reporter (Calgary), morning co-host (Edmonton)
- Glen Stone - science editor
- Marianne Summers - Good Morning Toronto co-host
- Frank Switzer - Calgary bureau chief, news director
- Stan Taylor - Morning news anchor
- Ted Tevan - sports-themed talk show in 1989
- Pat Turner - London bureau chief, 1979
- Peter Varley
- Larry Wachtel - Wall Street business commentator
- Denis Woollings - Newshour, co-host Good Morning Toronto, documentary announcer
- Hildegard Zagorski - Wall Street business commentator

== See also ==
- All-news radio
- CFTR (AM), which became an all-news station in Toronto in 1993
