= Tab International =

Canadian tabloid newspaper and adult magazine

- Type: Tabloid newspaper
- Founder: Joe Tensee
- Founded: 1956
- Ceased publication: c. 1990
- Language: English
- City: Toronto
- Country: Canada

Tab International, originally published as Toronto Tab and also known as Tab Confidential and Tab, was a Canadian tabloid newspaper and later adult magazine published in Toronto. It was founded in 1956 by journalist and broadcaster Joseph Francis "Joe" Tensee, a former editor of the Toronto tabloid Flash.

Initially covering scandal, crime, entertainment, nightlife and gossip, the publication appeared under several variants of the Tab name before becoming Tab International. It continued as a weekly newspaper into the 1970s before becoming biweekly, and increasingly emphasized sexual material and personal advertisements in its later years. It eventually became a swinger and fetish contact magazine.

== History ==
Tensee established the newspaper in 1956 after previously working for Flash. A May 1956 advertisement identified the publication as Toronto Tab, priced it at 10 cents, and promoted "Confidential Ticker", described as "Joe Tensee's New Bay Street Column".

By April 1957, advertisements were referring to the publication as Tab Confidential. A Globe and Mail advertisement described it as "Joe Tensee's Tab Confidential" and stated that it appeared every Wednesday.

A March 1960 advertisement promoted an article entitled "Trujillo Welcomes Joe Tensee to Old Santo Domingo" and described Tab as "Canada's Fastest Growing Tabloid".

According to a 1970 profile by Val Clery in The Globe and Mail, the Tab International name originated with Tensee's reporting on the Dominican Republic. Clery wrote that Tensee had predicted an unsuccessful Cuban attack on the country three months before it occurred and was subsequently received by Dominican ruler Rafael Trujillo. Tensee credited the episode with inspiring the newspaper's "International" designation.

The shorter Tab name continued to be used in advertising. In July 1961, an advertisement promoted Tensee's article about the Berlin Crisis, "Wake Up, Canadians! We're at War's Edge", under a large TAB logo.

In 1966, Tab was criticized by a Toronto coroner over its reporting of a fatal restaurant fire, in which it claimed an employee who had been killed in the blaze had been ordered into the burning building to retrieve the owner's heroin. Tensee defended the newspaper's account, saying that the story was an exclusive and that a major newspaper had attempted to purchase it from the freelance reporter who supplied it.

By 1967, the publication was appearing as Tab International. Media scholar Will Straw discussed the May 27, 1967 issue in his chapter "Tabloid Expo", examining the newspaper's sensational coverage of Expo 67.

Tab also carried "The Gay Set", a regular gossip column about Toronto's gay social scene. Written initially under the pseudonym Lady Bessborough, it reported on events at gay bars and clubs. Lady Bessborough was later succeeded by Duke Gaylord, whose version of "The Gay Set" continued in Tab International as late as June 1985.

In 1970, Clery reported that Tensee produced much of the weekly newspaper himself.

The publication continued as a weekly across Canada into the 1970s before changing to a biweekly schedule. Its editorial emphasis increasingly shifted from general scandal, gossip and local affairs toward sexual material and personal advertisements. By the mid-1980s, it had been acquired by Tyrst Media Group and was being published as a swinger and fetish contact magazine. Archival holdings document Tab International into 1990; its ultimate date of cessation is unclear.

== Joe Tensee ==
Joseph Francis Tensee was born in Italy in 1912 and came to Canada while young. In January 1929, when he was 16, Tensee and a 20-year-old accomplice committed an armed robbery at a haberdashery on Yonge Street in Toronto. While the older man held the proprietor at gunpoint, Tensee took $54.75 from the cash register. He was convicted and sentenced to seven years' imprisonment and 20 strokes of the strap. An appeal for a reduced sentence, based in part on his youth, previous good character and the contention that he had been influenced by his older accomplice, was unsuccessful.

Tensee later entered journalism and became editor of Flash during the 1940s and 1950s. In 1945, while Tensee was hospitalized for several months, journalist Philip H. Daniels temporarily took over as editor. After Tensee returned late that year, Daniels left Flash and established the competing Justice Weekly, which began publication in January 1946.

Tensee also worked in radio at CKEY. In the late 1940s, he hosted Flash Weekly's Toronto Merry-Go-Round. A 1948 advertisement described the 15-minute Sunday-night program as combining interviews with material about Toronto politics, business and entertainment.

A 1950 Toronto Daily Star Gordon Sinclair column identified Tensee with CKEY and described him discussing Toronto nightclubs, gambling and other aspects of city nightlife on the air. Clery later described him as a pioneering radio gossip columnist during the period when CKEY was owned by Jack Kent Cooke.

Tensee's broadcasting and journalistic career was interrupted by tuberculosis. According to Clery, the illness resulted in the removal of one of his lungs and prevented him from returning to his typewriter for four years. After recovering, he returned to journalism and subsequently established Tab.

At a February 1961 public meeting on Canada–Cuba relations, Tensee, identified as the owner of Tab Publishing Co., interrupted the proceedings to accuse the speakers of being communists.

Tensee died at Toronto General Hospital on August 1, 1988.

== Archives ==
Issues of Tab International are held by the Toronto Public Library's Baldwin Collection of Canadiana, which catalogues the publication as a Toronto newspaper beginning in 1965. Material from the publication is also preserved in archival collections documenting Canadian LGBTQ history.

== See also ==
- Flash
- Hush
- Justice Weekly
