= Tabloid journalism =

Style of largely sensationalist journalism

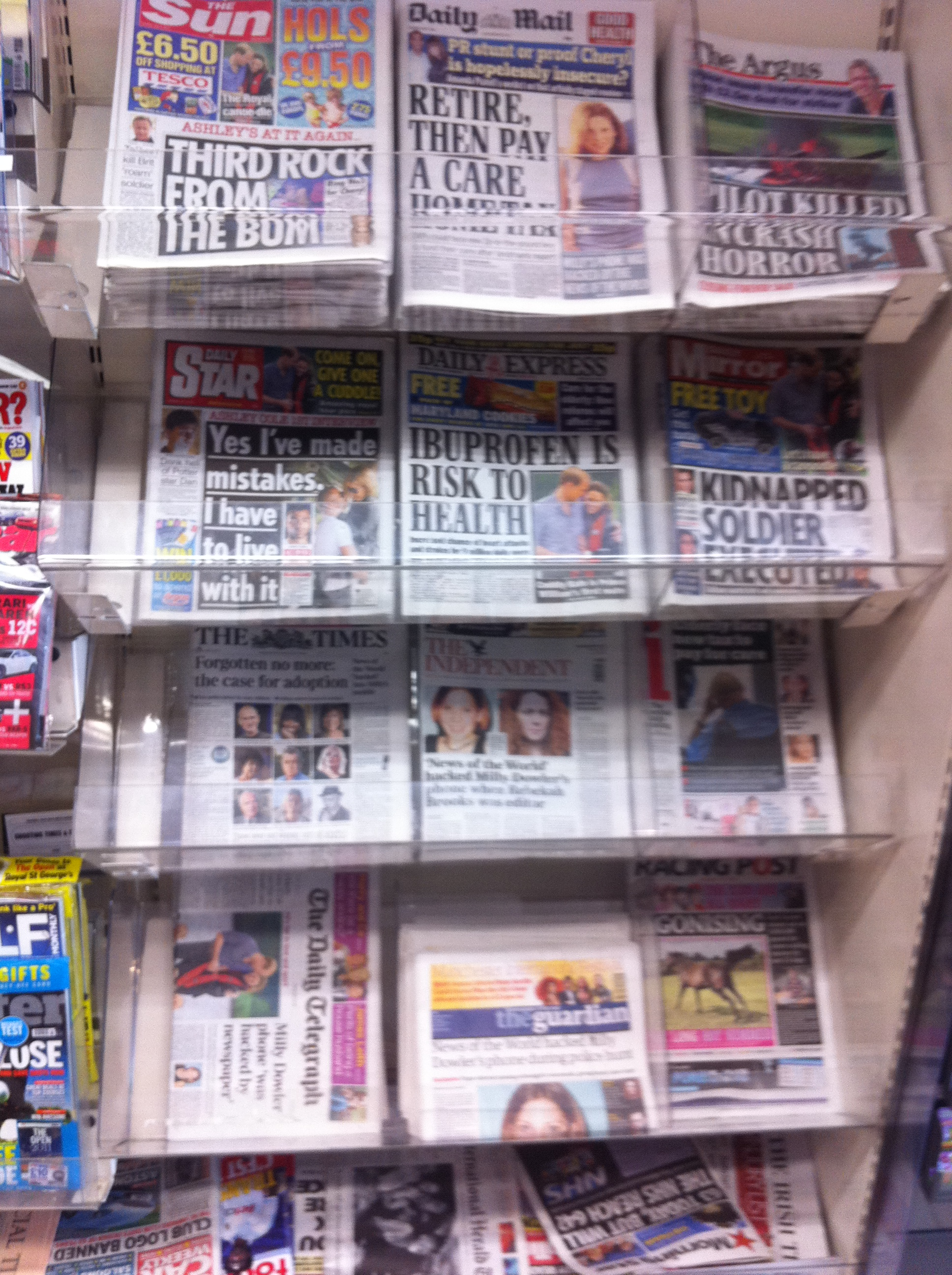
Display rack of British newspapers during the midst of the News International phone hacking scandal (5 July 2011). Many of the newspapers in the rack are tabloids.

Tabloid journalism is a popular style of largely sensationalist journalism, which takes its name from the tabloid newspaper format: a small-sized newspaper also known as a half broadsheet. The size became associated with sensationalism, and tabloid journalism replaced the earlier label of yellow journalism and scandal sheets. Not all newspapers associated with tabloid journalism are tabloid size, and not all tabloid-size newspapers engage in tabloid journalism; since around the year 2000, many broadsheet newspapers converted to the more compact tabloid format.

In some cases, celebrities have successfully sued tabloids for libel, demonstrating that the tabloid's stories have defamed them. Publications engaging in tabloid journalism are also known as rag newspapers or simply rags. In the 21st century, tabloid journalism has shifted to online platforms targeting youth consumers with celebrity news and entertainment.

== Scandal sheets ==
Scandal sheets were the precursors to tabloid journalism. Around 1770, scandal sheets appeared in London, and in the United States as early as the 1840s. Reverend Henry Bate Dudley was the editor of one of the earliest scandal sheets, The Morning Post, which specialized in printing malicious society gossip, selling positive mentions in its pages, and collecting suppression fees to keep stories unpublished. Other Georgian era scandal sheets were Theodore Hook's John Bull, Charles Molloy Westmacott's The Age, and Barnard Gregory's The Satirist. William d'Alton Mann, owner of the scandal sheet Town Topics, explained his purpose: "My ambition is to reform the Four Hundred by making them too deeply disgusted with themselves to continue their silly, empty way of life." Many scandal sheets in the United States were short-lived attempts at blackmail. One of the most popular in the U.S. was the National Police Gazette.

Scandal sheets in the early 20th century were usually 4- or 8-page cheap papers specializing in the lurid and profane, sometimes used to grind political, ideological, or personal axes, sometimes to make money (because "scandal sells"), and sometimes for extortion. A Duluth example was the Rip-saw, written by a fundamentalist journalist named John L. Morrison who was outraged by the vice and corruption he observed in that 1920s mining town. Rip-saw regularly published accusations of drunkenness, debauchery, and corruption against prominent citizens and public officials. Morrison was convicted of criminal libel in one instance, but his scandal sheet may have contributed to several politicians losing their elections. After Morrison published an issue claiming that State Senator Mike Boylan had threatened to kill him, Boylan responded by helping to pass the Public Nuisance Bill of 1925. It allowed a single judge, without jury, to stop a newspaper or magazine from publishing, forever. Morrison died before the new law could be used to shut down Rip-saw. The Saturday Press was another Minnesota scandal sheet. When the Public Nuisance Bill of 1925 was used to shut down The Saturday Press, the case made its way to the United States Supreme Court which found the gag law to be unconstitutional.

=== Canada ===
Canada developed its own tradition of scandal and tabloid newspapers during the 20th century. In Toronto, prominent examples included Hush, founded in 1927, Flash, founded in 1938, and Justice Weekly, founded in 1946, and Tab, founded in 1956. These publications combined sensational accounts of crime, sexuality and scandal with varying amounts of political commentary, local reporting, racing information, stock tips, gossip and personal advertisements.

Hush developed a national distribution network during the 1930s, with Toronto distributor Samuel Lichtman supplying provincial sub-agents who in turn distributed the paper to local retailers. Flash, founded by Lichtman and printer Hanmer Burt Lloyd, emerged as a direct competitor to Hush and became part of Toronto's postwar scandal-tabloid industry. Justice Weekly, founded by Philip H. Daniels in 1946, concentrated on crime, courts and punishment but also became an unusual Canadian outlet for material from the international homophile movement, publishing hundreds of articles and reprints concerning homosexuality during its run.

Montreal also developed a significant tabloid press. Midnight, founded in Montreal by Joe Azaria in 1954, began as a local entertainment and scandal publication but subsequently developed into a major North American supermarket tabloid.

By the 1960s and 1970s, some Canadian tabloids increasingly oriented themselves toward the much larger United States market. A 1970 survey of Toronto tabloids in The Globe and Mail reported that Flash, by then published as Confidential Flash, was styled in part for American readers and distributed a substantial portion of its circulation directly in the United States. Its presentation included more provocative photographs than most Canadian competitors, while its contents combined Toronto and Montreal material with entertainment and gossip from New York, Hollywood and Chicago.

The same trend was even more pronounced with Montreal's Midnight. The publication expanded from its Canadian origins into the American supermarket-tabloid market and eventually evolved into the Globe. This cross-border development helped connect the earlier Canadian scandal-sheet tradition with the North American supermarket-tabloid industry that became prominent during the later 20th century.

== Supermarket tabloids ==
In the United States and Canada, "supermarket tabloids" are large, national versions of these tabloids, usually published weekly. They are named for their prominent placement along the supermarket checkout lines.

In the 1960s, the National Enquirer began selling magazines in supermarkets as an alternative to newsstands. To help with their rapport with supermarkets and continue their franchise within them, they had offered to buy back unsold issues so newer, more up to date ones could be displayed.

These tabloids—such as the Globe and the National Enquirer—often use aggressive tactics to sell their issues. Unlike regular tabloid-format newspapers, supermarket tabloids are distributed through the magazine distribution channel like other weekly magazines and mass-market paperback books. Leading examples include the National Enquirer, Star, Weekly World News (later reinvented as a parody of the style), and the Sun. Most major supermarket tabloids in the United States are published by American Media, Inc., including the National Enquirer, Star, Globe, and National Examiner.

A major event in the history of American supermarket tabloids was the successful libel lawsuit by Carol Burnett against the National Enquirer (Carol Burnett v. National Enquirer, Inc.), arising out of a false 1976 report in the National Enquirer, implying she was drunk and boisterous in a public encounter with U.S. Secretary of State Henry Kissinger. Though its impact is widely debated, it is generally seen as a significant turning point in the relations between celebrities and tabloid journalism, increasing the willingness of celebrities to sue for libel in the United States, and somewhat dampening the recklessness of American tabloids. Other celebrities have attempted to sue tabloid magazines for libel and slander including Phil McGraw in 2016 and Richard Simmons in 2017.

Tabloids may pay for stories. Besides scoops meant to be headline stories, this can be used to censor stories damaging to the paper's allies. Known as "catch and kill", tabloid newspapers may pay someone for the exclusive rights to a story, then choose not to run it. Publisher American Media has been accused of burying stories embarrassing to Arnold Schwarzenegger, Donald Trump, and Harvey Weinstein.

== Red tops ==
The term "red tops" refers to British tabloids with red mastheads, such as The Sun, the Daily Star, the Daily Mirror, News of the World, and the Daily Record. Red top publications may report on politics and international news, but tend to focus primarily on celebrity gossip and sensationalism. Red tops publish short stories with simple language and typically use more pictures than other newspapers. These are distinguished from the UK's middle-market newspapers, which have a similar size but more news content, which are known as the "black tops".

== Modern tabloid journalism ==
In the early 21st century, much of tabloid journalism and news production changed mediums to online formats. This change is to keep up with the era of digital media and allow for increased accessibility of readers. With a steady decline in paid newspapers, the gap has been filled by expected free daily articles, mostly in the tabloid format. Tabloid readers are often youths, and studies show that consumers of tabloids are on average less educated. It can often depict inaccurate news and misrepresent individuals and situations.

== See also ==
- Benji the Binman
- Disinformation
- Index of journalism articles
- Mediatization (media), for the social and political consequences of tabloidization
- Middle-market newspaper
- Misinformation
