= Flash (tabloid) =

Canadian tabloid newspaper published in Toronto

- Type: Weekly tabloid
- Format: Tabloid
- Founder(s): Samuel Lichtman and Hanmer Burt Lloyd
- Founded: 1938
- Ceased publication: c. 1975
- Language: English
- Headquarters: Toronto, Ontario, Canada

Flash, later known as Confidential Flash, was a Canadian weekly tabloid newspaper founded in Toronto, Ontario, in 1938. Its founders were newspaper distributor and bookseller Samuel Lichtman and printer Hanmer Burt Lloyd, both of whom had previously worked with the Toronto tabloid Hush.

The newspaper ceased publication in Toronto in 1973. Confidential Flash subsequently moved to Montreal, where it continued until at least 1975.

== History ==
Lloyd's Sovereign Press had printed Hush, while Lichtman served as the newspaper's distributor. In 1931, Lloyd invested $15,000 in a large printing press to accommodate Hush. The following year, Hush owner Strathearn Boyd Thomson moved the newspaper's editorial and printing operations elsewhere, leaving Lloyd with the recently purchased press and the loss of a significant printing account.

Lloyd and Lichtman subsequently became business partners and by 1937 were proprietors of Newsdealer's Publishing Company. In 1938, they launched Flash as a competitor to Hush. The new publication closely imitated the appearance and format of Hush.

By 1943, Flash was published by John Blunt Publications Ltd., which came under the control of majority shareholder Louis "Lou" Ruby (1901–1979). Ruby also published the horse-racing periodical The Thoroughbred.

Joseph F. Tensee (1912–1988) served as editor of Flash during the 1940s and 1950s. In mid-1945, while Tensee was hospitalized for several months, journalist Philip H. Daniels temporarily took over as editor. After Tensee returned late that year, Daniels left Flash and established Justice Weekly, which began publication in January 1946. Daniels intended the new publication as an alternative to Flash and Hush Free Press, which he believed placed greater emphasis on making money than exposing wrongdoing or pursuing "justice".

Tensee hosted The Flash Show on Toronto radio station CKEY on Sunday nights from 1946 to 1954. In 1956, he founded the rival Toronto tabloid Tab, which later became known as Tab International.

By the early 1960s, the newspaper was being published under the title Confidential Flash. By 1970, Confidential Flash was oriented in significant part toward the United States market. A profile in The Globe and Mail described its style as more closely resembling American tabloids than most of its Canadian competitors, particularly in its use of provocative front-page photographs and sensational headlines.

In 1963, John Blunt Publications and Flash advertising manager Harry Greenberg were each fined $500 after being convicted of publishing obscene written matter in the newspaper. The case concerned a full-page advertisement for a mail-order record whose wording was found to be obscene. Greenberg testified that the advertisement had been removed after he was alerted to it.

The paper combined Toronto and Montreal stories with entertainment and gossip material concerning New York, Hollywood and Chicago. Its advertising manager, Harry Greenberg, said that distribution in Canada had become difficult and comparatively unprofitable, while the paper distributed much of its American circulation itself. According to Greenberg, U.S. dealers continued to buy the publication despite occasionally objecting to the amount of Canadian material it carried.

Ruby's brother Moe Ruby was associated with rival Hush, which he had previously published. Moe Ruby later entered the newsstand and bookselling business, purchasing a surviving Lichtman's store in 1968.

== Legal disputes ==
Soon after the establishment of Flash, Hush proprietor Strathearn Boyd Thomson brought legal action against Lloyd and Lichtman over the new newspaper's resemblance to his publication. Thomson sought an injunction prohibiting them from using a name that he alleged was designed to confuse the public. The action was unsuccessful, and Flash continued publication.

Flash again faced the possibility of being restrained from publication shortly after the outbreak of the Second World War. In November 1939, Ontario Attorney General Gordon Conant began proceedings against five Toronto tabloids—Flash, Hush, Week-Ender, National Tattler and Scoop—whose content the provincial government regarded as obscene or immoral.

Conant applied to the Supreme Court of Ontario for injunctions under provisions of Ontario's Judicature Act concerning newspapers and periodicals that repeatedly published material considered obscene or immoral.

Later that month, the publishers of Flash, Hush, Week-Ender and National Tattler agreed to alter their editorial content and refrain from publishing material considered obscene, immoral or injurious to public morals. Chief Justice Hugh Rose adjourned the proceedings, allowing them to be revived if the publications failed to comply.

== Content and circulation ==
Flash covered crime, political scandal, sex, society gossip and other sensational subjects. In the postwar period, it was one of several Toronto scandal tabloids, alongside Hush, Justice Weekly, True New Times, Rocket and Tab.

At its 1963 obscenity trial, a police officer testified that Flash distributed approximately 6,000 to 7,000 copies locally in Toronto, 20,000 elsewhere in Canada, and about 120,000 copies in the United States and other markets.

A 1970 profile of Toronto's tabloid industry in The Globe and Mail described Flash as the most visually flamboyant of the city's tabloids. Its front page typically featured provocative photographs and sensational headlines, while its inside pages combined local Toronto stories with entertainment and gossip columns concerning subjects in Canada and the United States.

The newspaper's advertising manager in 1970 was Harry Greenberg. He told the Globe and Mail that Flash had a substantial market in the United States and that its style was tailored in part to American tabloid readers. Clery observed that the publication carried more prominent and more revealing photographs than were usual in Canadian tabloids and that its presentation resembled American competitors.

Greenberg said that distribution in Canada had become relatively difficult and less profitable, while the newspaper distributed much of its American circulation itself across the border. According to Greenberg, American dealers continued to purchase the paper despite occasionally objecting to Canadian material appearing in it.

By 1970, Greenberg believed that younger readers were less interested in traditional tabloids than earlier generations had been. He nevertheless remained uncertain whether the format would disappear, noting both continuing demand and the possibility that more explicit American tabloids could compete with Canadian publications.

In 1972, Toronto Star writer William Cameron reported that Confidential Flash had sold more than 100,000 copies a week roughly two decades earlier, but that circulation had fallen to about 30,000 by 1971. During the 1960s, the newspaper had increasingly emphasized sexual material and photographs of scantily clad women. Under managing editor Larry Goldstein, it reduced this material, removed or toned down explicit advertising, hired new writers and increased its coverage of consumer and political issues.

Flash also reported extensively on Toronto's gay and lesbian nightlife, often in a sensational or hostile manner.

Flash ceased publication in Toronto in 1973. In 1974, Confidential Flash moved from Toronto to Montreal and continued publishing until at least 1975.

== See also ==
- Hush
- Justice Weekly
- Tab International
