= Elwood Glover =

Canadian broadcaster

William Elwood Glover (May 11, 1915 - November 14, 1990) was a Canadian radio and television broadcaster who was best known as host of Elwood Glover's Luncheon Date.

Born in Carmel, Saskatchewan, Glover began his 46-year broadcasting career in the city near his home town, Moose Jaw, Saskatchewan at a 250 watt radio station (CHAB) for $5 a week. From there he moved on to Toronto in 1938 to be one of the six staff announcers at CBC. He remained at the CBC for the next 35 years. In 1939, he covered the Royal tour of King George VI and was the CBC's chief announcer during World War II.

Following the war, Glover was the host of At Ease with Elwood Glover, an afternoon drive show on CBC radio in the 1950s and 1960s.

Elwood Glover's Luncheon Date debuted on the radio in 1956, then was later moved to CBC television in 1963, where Glover interviewed thousands of guests on Luncheon Date over the next twelve years, including performers such as Ella Fitzgerald, Henry Fonda, The Supremes, Lorne Greene, Eartha Kitt, Christopher Plummer, Spring Byington and Mel Tormé.

A clarinetist and one time bandleader, Glover used his programs to especially highlight Canadian talent. One such Canadian guest, Stompin' Tom Connors, was married on Glover's show in 1973.

Fans and critics called Glover "Mr. Bland"," "Mr. Cool", "Mr. Nice Guy", or "Mr. Molasses". Glover took it in stride and said, "I'd like to be a more colourful person, but I haven't the makeup for it. I've got this label of a nice guy and it bores the hell out of me. But I hold myself back a little and let my guest shine out."

Glover then moved back to radio in 1975, working at radio stations CKEY (where for four years he was their most popular host), CKO and FM-108 in Burlington.

A quadruple bypass in 1982 along with overall poor health forced Glover to retire in 1983.

Glover died on November 14, 1990, leaving his wife, two daughters and five grandchildren. He was 75.
