= Hush (tabloid) =

Canadian tabloid newspaper published in Toronto

- Type: Weekly tabloid
- Format: Tabloid
- Founder: Strathearn Boyd Thomson
- Founded: November 25, 1927
- Ceased publication: November 10, 1973
- Language: English
- Headquarters: Toronto, Ontario, Canada

Hush, later known as Hush Free Press, was a Canadian weekly tabloid newspaper published in Toronto, Ontario, from 1927 to 1973. Founded by Strathearn Boyd Thomson, it published crime reporting, society gossip, political commentary, investigations of municipal affairs and stock-market promotions.

== History ==
=== Thomson era ===
Hush was established by Strathearn Boyd Thomson, with its first issue appearing on November 25, 1927. Thomson was a horse breeder and promoter as well as a newspaper publisher. The newspaper combined crime and vice stories, society gossip, political commentary and reporting on municipal affairs with stock-market promotion.

The tabloid frequently criticized members of Toronto's social and political establishment and also operated as a stock-market tip sheet. Historian Susan E. Houston describes stock promotion as part of the newspaper's business alongside political commentary and reporting on public affairs.

Hush developed distribution beyond Toronto. By the early 1930s, eastern and western editions were being produced, and the newspaper was distributed nationally through Toronto news agent Samuel Lichtman. Lichtman's distribution network used provincial sub-agents who supplied local newsstands and other retailers.

=== 1929 assault on Thomson ===
Hush campaigned for reform of horse-racing regulation in Ontario, with Thomson using the paper to criticize the Ontario Jockey Club and advocate restrictions on racing officials acting on behalf of United States-based interests. The paper also alleged that some jockey-club officials were not acting in the public interest.

On June 1, 1929, Thomson was assaulted at Thorncliffe Park Raceway in view of spectators attending a race meeting. He was struck in the face, knocked to the ground and repeatedly kicked, leaving him semi-conscious. Thomson identified Allen Case, president of the Pease Heating Company and a director of the Ontario Jockey Club; Harry Barclay Johnston, president of the H. B. Johnston Company; and horse owner and trainer James Bosley Jr. as his assailants. Warrants were issued for the three men.

On June 3, directors of the Thorncliffe Park Racing and Breeding Association met to consider the incident. Association president Arthur Walkem said the assault should not be regarded as reflecting the association's attitude toward Thomson's reporting. The association continued to accept entries for Bosley's horses pending the outcome of the criminal proceedings.

At a preliminary hearing later that month, Thomson testified that complaints had previously been made to him about articles published in Hush and that he had been warned at the King Edward Hotel to "lay off" or risk being "bumped off". The three accused were committed for trial.

At trial in July, Judge Denton found that the prosecution had not established that the three men had conspired to assault Thomson. Case and Bosley were acquitted. Johnston was convicted of assault and fined $300, with two months' imprisonment in default of payment; he paid the fine immediately.

=== Dispute with Sovereign Press ===
During the early 1930s, Hush was printed by Hanmer Burt Lloyd's Sovereign Press in Toronto. Because of the newspaper's unusual dimensions, in 1931 Lloyd invested approximately $15,000 in an oversized printing press to accommodate the Hush account.

In 1932, Thomson moved the editorial and printing operations of Hush away from Sovereign Press, leaving Lloyd with the recently purchased equipment and the loss of a significant printing account. Samuel Lichtman had served as the newspaper's distributor.

Lloyd and Lichtman later became business partners. By 1937, they were proprietors of Newsdealer's Publishing Company, and in 1938 they launched the weekly tabloid Flash. The new newspaper was deliberately similar to Hush in appearance and format. Thomson sought an injunction against Lloyd and Lichtman, alleging that the similarities were intended to confuse readers, but was unsuccessful.

=== Closure and 1939 revival ===
Thomson's version of Hush ceased publication around December 1937.

The title was revived in July 1939 by Richard Abie Sair and Harry Silverman through the Hush Publishing Company. Sair was accused of libelling Sudbury newspaper publisher William E. Mason, while Sair and others associated with Hush faced additional libel and morality-related charges.

In November 1939, the Ontario attorney general ordered Hush and four other Toronto tabloids to cease publication amid the legal campaign against the papers. This incarnation of Hush subsequently ceased publication.

=== George Shear era and Hush Free Press ===
The title was revived again under George Shear around 1940 or 1941. In a 1970 interview, Shear recalled that he had purchased the Hush name from people he identified as Smith, Wright, Weir and Cartwright, although he was uncertain whether the transaction occurred in 1940 or 1941. On October 27, 1945, the publication became Hush Free Press, the title under which it continued for most of the postwar period.

By 1951, Hush Free Press had a circulation of approximately 48,000 copies. About half of each issue was sold in Toronto, approximately 5,000 copies were mailed to subscribers, and the remainder were sold on newsstands across Canada, from Halifax to Vancouver.

Morris "Moe" Ruby was also associated with Hush as a publisher, although the period of his involvement is unclear. A 2000 Toronto Star retrospective described Ruby as a former publisher of the newspaper and noted that his brother, Louis "Lou" Ruby, was publisher of rival Flash. Moe Ruby later entered the newsstand and bookselling business, purchasing a surviving Lichtman's location in 1968; his son Gerry Ruby subsequently developed the business into a chain of newsstands and bookstores.

=== The newspaper in 1970 ===
A 1970 profile in The Globe and Mail described Hush Free Press as being published from offices on Bay Street, with George Shear as publisher, Mel Shear as editor and Frank Fowler as a columnist. The newspaper used a larger page format than some competing Toronto tabloids and a two-colour front page with photographs. Its contents included original Toronto reporting, racing information, a financial column, sports commentary, humour and personal advertisements.

Clery considered Hush more recognizably a newspaper than some of its competitors, noting that original reporting on Toronto affairs appeared beneath its sensational presentation. Shear said the character of the paper had changed substantially since its earlier years: mainstream daily newspapers had increasingly entered subject areas once associated with tabloids, while Hush had moved away from some of its former sensationalism.

Shear also described a change in its business model. Whereas circulation had once been the principal measure of success, by about 1969 the newspaper had begun placing greater emphasis on advertisers and on demonstrating the authenticity of its readership.

The postwar newspaper published crime and sex stories, racing information, entertainment coverage, humour, personal advertisements and political and social commentary. It was one of several Toronto scandal tabloids of the period, alongside Flash, Justice Weekly, True New Times, Rocket and Tab.

Hush Free Press continued publication until November 10, 1973.

== Coverage of homosexuality ==
Hush reported on homosexuality and Toronto's gay and lesbian communities from its early years. Historian Steven Maynard has examined the newspaper's coverage of lesbians in the late 1920s, including reports published in 1928 and 1929 that presented lesbianism as scandalous while also providing rare contemporary descriptions of lesbian social life in Toronto.

During the postwar period, Hush Free Press continued to report extensively on gay men and homosexuality. Its coverage was frequently sensationalist and reflected the criminalization and social stigmatization of homosexuality during the period.

Historians have used reporting in Hush and other Toronto tabloids to study the city's gay and lesbian history. The newspapers documented bars, meeting places and social networks that received comparatively little attention in Toronto's mainstream press.

== Archives ==
The Toronto Public Library holds issues of Hush on microfilm as part of its historical Toronto newspaper collection.

== See also ==
- Flash
- Justice Weekly
- Tab International
