= Julie Ann Sageer =

American chef

Julie Taboulie (born Julie Ann Sageer) is an American chef who lives in the Finger Lakes region of New York. She is known for her TV Show: Julie Taboulie's Lebanese Kitchen.

She has a Bachelor of Fine Arts in Broadcasting Communications from Long Island University at C.W. Post Campus.
