= Justice Weekly =

Canadian weekly tabloid newspaper

- Type: Weekly tabloid
- Format: Tabloid
- Founder: Philip H. Daniels
- Founded: January 1946
- Ceased publication: April 15, 1972
- Language: English
- Headquarters: Toronto, Ontario, Canada

Justice Weekly was a Canadian weekly tabloid newspaper published in Toronto, Ontario, from January 1946 to April 15, 1972. Founded and published by journalist Philip H. Daniels, it concentrated on crime, courts, punishment and other subjects associated with the criminal justice system, while also publishing personal advertisements, letters, sexual and fetish-related material, and, particularly during the 1950s, a substantial amount of writing about homosexuality from the emerging international homophile movement.

== History ==
Philip H. Daniels was born in England in 1894 and immigrated to Canada in 1911. Before entering journalism, he worked as a professional boxer and promoter. He served in the Canadian Expeditionary Force during the First World War and edited the military newspaper The Siberian Bugle in Vladivostok following the war. His subsequent journalism career included work as editor of Canadian Sports and Daily Racing Form, associate editor of Sports Weekly, and reporter for the Toronto Daily News.

During the Second World War, Daniels returned to military service and edited The Bullet, the weekly newspaper of Military District No. 2 and Camp Borden.

Daniels became involved in Toronto's tabloid press through Flash, which was published by John Blunt Publications Ltd. In mid-1945, he temporarily became editor of Flash after its regular editor, Joseph F. Tensee, was hospitalized. When Tensee returned later that year, Daniels decided to establish his own newspaper.

Daniels conceived Justice Weekly as an alternative to Toronto tabloids such as Flash and Hush Free Press, which he believed were more concerned with making money than exposing wrongdoing and pursuing "justice". Using contacts from his wartime service, he obtained a publishing licence from the Wartime Prices and Trades Board as well as an allotment of newsprint. The first issue appeared during the first week of January 1946.

== Format and content ==
Justice Weekly was published each Saturday. Its physical appearance changed little during its 26-year run. Each issue consisted of 16 pages printed in black ink on newsprint and measured approximately 11 by 8.5 inches (28 by 22 cm).

The newspaper regularly carried reports on criminal cases, courts and punishment, as well as editorials, letters to the editor, personal advertisements and Canadian and international news. It became particularly associated with discussions of corporal punishment, discipline, fetishism and cross-dressing. Some of its letters and articles dealing with those subjects were later republished in anthologies.

The newspaper also published detailed reports of arrests and prosecutions involving homosexuality. These reports could identify defendants by name, age, occupation and home address, reflecting contemporary journalistic practices and the criminalization of homosexual activity in Canada.

== Homophile publishing ==
Beginning in the early 1950s, Justice Weekly became an unusual Canadian outlet for material presenting homosexuality from the perspective of gay writers and the developing international homophile movement.

Canadian gay activist James Egan began contributing letters to the newspaper in 1951. In December 1953, Daniels began publishing Egan's 12-part series "Homosexual Concepts". The columns discussed subjects including the Mattachine Society, ONE Magazine, the Kinsey Reports, homosexuality in history, gay bars, stereotypes, media treatment of gay people and contemporary legal and social controversies.

A second series by Egan followed from March through June 1954. Daniels initially paid Egan $10 for each column, but discontinued payment after the articles failed to produce the hoped-for increase in circulation. He nevertheless allowed Egan to continue contributing without payment.

Daniels explained his editorial policy as one of allowing competing viewpoints to appear in the newspaper. Although he personally expressed reservations about homosexuality, he maintained that homosexual people should be permitted to present their perspective in print.

In May 1954, Justice Weekly published a letter by D. C. Benedetti calling for gay Canadians to organize along the lines of the American Mattachine movement. The letter appeared approximately a decade before Canada's first recognized homophile organizations and gay periodicals were established.

=== International homophile press ===
Egan encouraged Daniels to establish relationships with American gay publications. Beginning in 1954, Justice Weekly entered into exchange arrangements that permitted it to reprint material from ONE Magazine and subsequently other homophile publications.

The newspaper eventually reprinted material from publications including ONE Magazine, Mattachine Review, The Ladder, Tangents and Tangents Newsletter, as well as material originating in European publications including Arcadie, Der Kreis, Vennen and Vriendschap.

McLeod identified at least 435 homophile articles, editorials and news items published in Justice Weekly. Of these, 89 were original items and 346 were reprints, including 218 from ONE Magazine, 93 from Mattachine Review, 13 from Tangents, and 10 from The Ladder. The material included commentary, news, historical articles and 125 works of short fiction.

Homophile content was most prominent during the 1950s. McLeod identified 292 such items published during that decade, representing approximately two-thirds of the total he located. The amount declined during the 1960s as older homophile publications ceased publication and a specifically Canadian gay press developed.

== Decline and closure ==
By the late 1960s, Daniels's age and declining health raised questions about the future of the newspaper. In 1968, he informed readers that physical difficulties might eventually require him to relinquish control of the publication.

By 1970, Daniels was advertising for a working partner with capital who could learn the publishing, editorial and reporting sides of the business and eventually succeed him. He was unable to find a suitable successor.

The final issue of Justice Weekly appeared on April 15, 1972, ending a run of more than 26 years. Daniels subsequently retired. He died in Toronto in 1988 at the age of 94.

== Legacy ==
Justice Weekly has become a source for researchers studying Canadian criminal justice, sexual culture and the history of LGBTQ people in Canada. Its publication of Egan's writings and hundreds of articles from the international homophile press made material advocating or explaining gay perspectives available in Canada at a time when such material was otherwise difficult to obtain.

Selections of the newspaper's material concerning cross-dressing, corporal punishment and fetishism have also been republished in book form.

Copies of the newspaper survive in several library and archival collections.

== See also ==
- Flash
- Hush
- Tab International
