= Dick Diespecker =

Canadian novelist and journalist

Richard Alan Diespecker (March 1, 1907 — February 11, 1973) was a Canadian novelist and journalist.

Born in Adstock, England, Diespecker was educated at the University of British Columbia. After a brief career in teaching, in 1927 he became a journalist with The Vancouver Star. Diespecker later joined the staffs of The Vancouver News and The Victoria Colonist. He began broadcasting in Vancouver at CJOR, which produced many of his radio plays. Diespecker had a brief army career during World War II and is best known by veterans for his "Prayer for Victory" which received acclaim in the United States and in Canada.

Diespecker died at the age of 65 in San Francisco, California.

== Selected bibliography ==
- Between Two Furious Oceans (1944)
- Elizabeth (1950)
- Rebound (1953)
