= Pat Burns (broadcaster) =

Canadian radio personality (1921–1996)

- Born: 1921; Montreal, Quebec, Canada
- Died: June 8, 1996; Vancouver, British Columbia, Canada
- Occupation(s): broadcaster, journalist

Patrick Burns (1921 – June 8, 1996) was a Canadian radio talk show host and newspaper reporter. He was born in Montreal, Quebec, but began his radio career in England with the BBC as a sports reporter covering the world hockey championships in London in 1949. After working for a time as a news/sports reporter for the Vancouver Province, he worked as the News/Sports Director for CKLG in Vancouver, BC, from 1955 to 1963. On May 13, 1963, the "Burns Hot Line" made its debut on CJOR in Vancouver, BC, which earned him recognition as one of Canadian radio's most fascinating and dynamic radio personalities.

In 1965, Pat hosted a series of programs from Selma, Alabama, where Martin Luther King Jr. was helping to change the United States forever. He was fired a short while after those historic broadcasts. His dismissal was widely protested but the decision stood, and Pat returned briefly to newspaper reporting before joining CKGM in Montreal later in the decade. The "Burns Hot Line" returned to the air for a while between 1969 and 1976 after which he did news and commentary.

The "Hot Line" returned to CJOR in Vancouver in 1980. Burns once worked at CKO, the Canadian news radio network.

In 1996 Pat Burns was inducted into the Canadian Association of Broadcasters Hall of Fame following his death earlier that year in Vancouver, British Columbia.
