= Samuel Lichtman =

Canadian bookseller and newspaper publisher

Samuel "Sammy" Lichtman (June 13, 1888 – March 11, 1958) was a Canadian bookseller, newsdealer, newspaper distributor, publisher and labour organizer based in Toronto, Ontario. A Jewish immigrant from Galicia, he began his career as a Toronto newsboy, became the first head of the Newsies Union, and in 1909 founded the newsstand business that later became Lichtman's, a chain of bookstores and newsstands. In 1938, he and printer Hanmer Burt Lloyd founded the weekly Toronto tabloid newspaper Flash.

== Early life ==
Lichtman was born in 1888 in Galicia, then part of Austria-Hungary. His surname was originally spelled Lichtmann, but he later dropped the second "n". He came to Toronto as a teenager with little money and unable to speak English. A 1913 profile in the Toronto Daily Star reported that he arrived in the summer of 1902 at the age of 14 with 24 cents, while a 2000 Toronto Star retrospective, based on recollections of his daughters, gave the year as 1901 and his age as 13.

Lichtman briefly worked as a bootblack before becoming a newsboy. He bought newspapers wholesale from the mailrooms of Toronto newspapers and sold them on the streets. As a teenager, he reportedly sold between 400 and 500 copies of the morning newspapers outside Toronto's General Post Office. He later returned in the evening to the corner of Yonge and King streets, where he would buy the remaining newspapers from other newsboys and continue selling them to late-night customers, sometimes until 2 a.m. He learned English from other newsboys and attended night school.

Toronto's newsboys at the time included large numbers of Jewish and Irish boys who competed intensely for profitable street corners. The two groups also competed in rugby matches at Bayside Park, with contemporary newspapers reporting the contests as a rivalry between Jewish and Irish newsboys.

== Newsboy activism and philanthropy ==
Lichtman became the first head of Toronto's Newsies Union, which was affiliated with the Toronto Labour Council. In that capacity, he acted as a negotiator with newspaper owners on behalf of the city's newsboys.

In 1910, Lichtman led a strike against the Toronto Daily Star over the wholesale price charged to newsboys. The boys refused to distribute the newspaper until its price was reduced from seven cents to six cents per dozen, bringing it into line with competing Toronto newspapers.

Lichtman also organized fundraising for disadvantaged newsboys. He spearheaded a successful campaign to purchase a group home on Pembroke Street for the boys, many of whom were orphans. The facility included bathing and gym facilities and provided classroom instruction for boys whose work schedules permitted them to attend. He was also involved in organizing an annual newsboys' picnic; approximately 500 boys were expected to attend the 1913 event at Centre Island.

As his business prospered, Lichtman donated to the Hospital for Sick Children and other charitable causes.

== Business career ==
Lichtman saved much of his income from selling newspapers and invested in Toronto real estate. By 1913, the Toronto Daily Star estimated his net worth at approximately $50,000 and reported that he owned houses and stores in central Toronto.

Lichtman's newsstand business dated to 1909, when he established an operation at the corner of Queen Street and Bay Street. His business specialized in newspapers and periodicals from around the world. Its slogan was "Name your city, and we have your home paper", reflecting its emphasis on imported newspapers serving Toronto's growing immigrant population.

By 1911, Lichtman had opened a newspaper and magazine store, and he eventually operated four locations, none of which were at the sites later occupied by the Lichtman's chain. In addition to newspapers, magazines and books, the Queen Street store included a soda fountain, booths and wrought-iron ice-cream tables. His stores became known for carrying international publications that were otherwise difficult to obtain in Toronto.

During the Great Depression, unemployed men sometimes spent time in Lichtman's stores reading newspapers and other publications without making purchases. His daughters later recalled that he allowed them to remain without interference.

Lichtman also continued to assist other newsboys in establishing businesses of their own. In 1913, the Daily Star described an arrangement in which he sold one of his newspaper-selling operations to two teenage employees and helped finance their purchase through a bank account from which they could obtain money to buy newspapers.

During the 1930s, Lichtman sold his stores one by one and moved into other business ventures. A store near Temperance and Bay streets continued to operate under the Lichtman name, although it subsequently passed through several owners. In 1968 it was purchased from Ira Ruderman by Moe Ruby, whose son Gerry Ruby expanded the business during the 1970s into a chain of newsstands and bookstores.

== Publishing ==
Lichtman became the distributor of the Toronto scandal newspaper Hush, which was printed by Hanmer Burt Lloyd through his Sovereign Press. Lichtman and Lloyd subsequently became business partners and by 1937 were proprietors of Newsdealer's Publishing Company.

In 1938, Lichtman and Lloyd launched Flash as a competitor to Hush. The new publication closely imitated the appearance and format of Hush, prompting its owner to seek an injunction against Lichtman and Lloyd on the grounds that the similarity was intended to confuse readers. The attempt was unsuccessful.

Flash was later published by Louis "Lou" Ruby, whose brother Moe subsequently acquired the surviving Lichtman's store.

Lichtman was also involved in publishing horse-racing information during the early 1920s. In January 1921, he and J. D. Zipper entered into a partnership to publish The Last Minute Racing News. According to a lawsuit subsequently brought by Zipper, the venture began with capital of $200 and generated approximately $31,000 in profits.

Lichtman's publication of racing information also resulted in legal proceedings under Ontario's Betting Information Act. He was prosecuted for publishing information concerning horse-racing odds, but the case was dismissed by Judge Denton on the grounds that the provincial legislation was beyond the jurisdiction of the Ontario legislature. The Crown appealed the dismissal in Rex v. Lichtman, but in September 1923 the Ontario Appellate Division unanimously dismissed the appeal. The five-judge panel held that the province's Betting Information Act was ultra vires because Parliament had already legislated on betting information through the Criminal Code. Attorney General William Folger Nickle subsequently announced that outstanding prosecutions under the provincial statute would be withdrawn.

In 1924, the partnership between Lichtman and Zipper became the subject of a separate civil dispute. Zipper sought a declaration dissolving the partnership, an accounting of the amounts owing between the partners and damages, alleging that the partnership's affairs had not been conducted satisfactorily. The parties ultimately consented to have the dispute referred to arbitration.

== Personal life ==
Lichtman used his earnings to bring members of his family to Canada from Europe. By 1913, his sister and her husband were living with him on Baldwin Street in Toronto.

He and his wife, Fanny, had four daughters: Grace, Marjorie, Eileen and Maxine. Fanny also worked in the family's stores. Their eldest daughter was born in 1920. His daughters later recalled that Lichtman worked from early morning until around midnight, rarely took holidays and had become a familiar figure in downtown Toronto.

Lichtman died in Toronto in 1958, aged 69.

== Legacy ==
The Lichtman name remained attached to the Toronto bookselling and newsstand business for decades after he had sold his stores. Under the Ruby family, Lichtman's eventually expanded to nine locations. By 2000, the chain carried more than 300 newspaper titles and approximately 5,000 magazines.

The company filed for bankruptcy in 2000 with debts of approximately $2.8 million. Owner Gerry Ruby attributed its difficulties in part to competition from large bookstore chains including Chapters and Indigo and to the increasing availability of newspapers and other information on the Internet.

== See also ==
- Lichtman's
- Flash
- Hush
