= CFOX (AM) =

Former radio station in Montreal

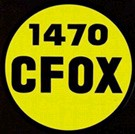

Pointe-Claire, Quebec; Canada
- Broadcast area: Montreal
- Frequency: 1470 kHz
- Branding: 1470 CFOX

Programming
- Format: top 40, then all-news

Ownership
- Owner: Lakeshore Broadcasting, then Canada All-News Radio Limited

History
- First air date: 1960
- Last air date: November 10, 1989
- Former call signs: CKO (1977–1989)

Technical information
- Class: B
- ERP: 10,000 watts

CKO/CFOX was an English language Canadian AM radio station located in Pointe-Claire, Quebec from 1960 to 1989. The station's call sign was CFOX from 1960 to 1977 and it later operated as CKO, the Montreal station of the news network of the same name, from 1977 until 1989.

== History ==
With studios based at 203 Hymus Blvd. in Pointe-Claire, the station went on air on March 15, 1960 as CFOX with an adult contemporary format with 1,000 watts of power. On February 5, 1963, the station upgraded their signal to 10,000 watts. In 1964 the station format changed to country, and in 1965 to a Top 40 station.

The station was originally operated by Lakeshore Broadcasting, which was owned by noted Montreal radio journalist Gord Sinclair Jr. (the son of Toronto radio/TV journalist Gordon Sinclair). It was sold to Allan Slaight in 1972, and he converted it to a country format. In 1975, the station went back to a Top 40 format until September 1977. The last song played was Fox on the Run by Sweet.

Later that year it was purchased by the CKO news network, changing the call sign to CKO accordingly and converting it from Top 40 to an all-news format. The CFOX call sign would later resurface in January 1979 at an FM station in Vancouver.

In 1986, CKO applied to convert from the AM band to the FM band on 95.1 MHz; that application was denied on March 19, 1987. (95.1 FM has since been occupied by CBF-FM, after that station's relocation from 690 kHz in 1998.) On June 20, 1989, the commission approved an application by changing the frequency from 1470 kHz to 650 kHz, as a way to improve reception in areas of Montreal Island; CKO's frequency change proposal was never implemented.

The station went off air when the network ceased broadcasting during a noon newscast on November 10, 1989. The news was produced, but never aired. The broadcasting licences for the CKO network were returned to the CRTC in 1990. To this day the 650 and 1470 frequencies has not been reactivated in the Montreal area; in addition, the 1470 frequency would no longer be available in Montreal, following the 2007 sign on of CHOU on 1450, whose allocation relocated to Montreal from Granby. Its transmitter site with three antennas in Châteauguay was demolished in 1992.

CFOX is perhaps most famous for getting exclusive access to John Lennon and Yoko Ono's 1969 Bed-in for peace in room 1742 at the Queen Elizabeth Hotel, during which the song "Give Peace a Chance" was recorded.
