= Larry Wachtel =

Larry Wachtel (born Lawrence Marvin Wachtel; July 2, 1930 – December 2, 2007) was a stock, bonds, and equities commentator on the New York City metropolitan area radio. He added a populist flavor to his commentary on the stock market and spoke in a thick Brooklyn accent.

== Career ==
His comments were heard on 1010 WINS radio three times each trading day from approximately 1972 until 2005. He was Senior Vice President of Wachovia Bank until 2005 and worked for Prudential before Wachovia took it over.

== Quotes ==
Wachtel was known for his sign off catchphrase "Gather those rosebuds", which was inscribed on his tombstone after he died.

Other quotes include: "The Dow is dopey, ... It gained 1,000 points since mid-April. That's impressive. If it falls 100 points, so be it." "Now, this day prior to the long weekend, I don't think we'll have the cavalry charge at the close today. But I think this has legs. I think it could drive forward to, say, Dow 8500." "The weakness from Friday carried forward to the international markets and we could get a horrific open here today. The concerns stem from the rising rates structure and what we got on Friday was something of a good news, bad news syndrome."
