= CHLG-FM =

Radio station in Vancouver

- Vancouver, British Columbia; Canada
- Broadcast area: Greater Vancouver
- Frequency: 104.3 MHz (HD Radio)
- Branding: 104.3 The Breeze

Programming
- Format: Soft adult contemporary

Ownership
- Owner: Stingray Group; (8384860 Canada, Inc.)

History
- First air date: July 1, 2009
- Former call signs: CHHR-FM (2009–2014)
- Former frequencies: 104.1 MHz (2009–2010)
- Call sign meaning: "Lions Gate" (former branding, homage to CKLG)

Technical information
- Licensing authority: CRTC
- Class: C
- ERP: 3,600 watts; 9,100 watts peak
- HAAT: 567 metres (1,860 ft)

Links
- Website: 1043thebreeze.ca

CHLG-FM (104.3 FM, 104.3 The Breeze) is a commercial radio station in Vancouver, British Columbia. Owned by Stingray Group, the station broadcasts a soft adult contemporary format. Its studios are on Horseshoe Way in Richmond.

CHLG-FM is a Class C station. It has an effective radiated power (ERP) of 3,600 watts (9,100 watts peak). The transmitter is on Mount Seymour in the District of North Vancouver.

== History ==
=== CHHR-FM ===
The station was licensed as CHHR-FM by the Canadian Radio-television and Telecommunications Commission (CRTC) on May 30, 2008. The station started test transmissions at 104.1 MHz on June 1, 2009. After a month, it officially began broadcasting on July 1, 2009.

The station was owned by the Shore Media Group. It aired an adult album alternative format, branded as Shore 104. It was the second AAA station in Metro Vancouver, the other being CKPK-FM, owned by The Jim Pattison Group.

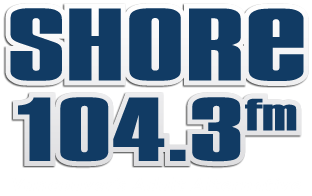
CHHR logo, 2011-2014

On January 14, 2010, CHHR changed frequency to 104.3 MHz in a swap with Bellingham, Washington's KAFE, a move to reduce interference between KAFE and Covington, Washington-based KMCQ (104.5). KAFE began broadcasting on 104.1, while CHHR could be heard on 104.3.

=== Sale to Astral Media ===
In 2011, Astral Media proposed the takeover of CHHR from Shore Media Group, a move initially rejected by the CRTC. Astral tried again and announced the planned purchase of CHHR on December 19, 2011, for $13.4 million. Astral's purchase was completed in February 2012.

Following Astral's takeover, the dismissal of CHHR's on-air staff and reservation of web domain names led to speculation that the station would change formats. As of February 2012, the CHHR website displayed only a message stating that "We're making changes to make Shore FM a better radio station. We appreciate your patience. For now, we're playing even more of your favourite Shore music..." The website invited listeners to submit suggestions or ideas.

On March 16, 2012, a month after the takeover of CHHR, Astral announced that an agreement was made to merge its assets with Bell Media for $3.38 billion. An early decision by the CRTC on October 18, 2012, denied the merger, but a later decision on March 4, 2013, approved it, on the condition that Bell would spin off several Astral properties, including CHHR-FM.

On April 6, 2012, after two months without DJs, the station updated its logo and slogan from "Music First!" to "Vancouver's Adult Alternative." Astral also announced DJs would return on April 16.

CHLG logo, 2014-2018

=== Sale to Newcap Radio; flip to classic hits ===
On August 26, 2013, Newcap Radio announced it would spend $112 million to acquire CHHR along with four other former Astral Media radio stations held under blind trust by Bell Media. This would give CHHR its fourth owner in a two-year period. The deal was approved by the CRTC on March 19, 2014, and the sale closed on March 31, 2014.

In June 2014, the call letters were changed to CHLG-FM. After letting go much of the on-air staff, CHLG changed formats to classic hits as LG 104.3 at 12:02 a.m. on June 20.

=== Soft AC "The Breeze" ===
On October 26, 2018, Stingray Group completed its acquisition of Newcap. In December 2018, Stingray announced that the station would flip to soft adult contemporary as 104.3 The Breeze.

The flip was planned for December 26, alongside sister station CKRA-FM in Edmonton. The station's playlist focuses on soft-to-mid tempo hits of the 1980s and 90s with a few older songs and a few 2000s titles.
