= CHKT =

Fairchild Radio station in Toronto

Coordinates: 43°37′3″N 79°22′46″W

- Toronto, Ontario; Canada
- Broadcast area: Greater Toronto Area
- Frequency: 1430 kHz
- Branding: Fairchild Radio

Programming
- Language: Chinese
- Format: Multilingual

Ownership
- Owner: Fairchild Group; (Fairchild Radio Group Ltd.)
- Sister stations: Fairchild TV

History
- First air date: May 5, 1925; 101 years ago
- Former call signs: CKCL (1925–1945); CKEY (1945–1991); CKYC (1991–1996)
- Former frequencies: 840 kHz (1925–1931); 580 kHz (1931–1964); 590 kHz (1964–1995)
- Call sign meaning: Canada Hong Kong Toronto

Technical information
- Licensing authority: CRTC
- Class: B (regional)
- Power: 50,000 watts

Links
- Website: www.fairchildradio.com

CHKT (1430 kHz) is a commercial AM radio station in Toronto, Ontario, Canada. The station, owned by the Fairchild Group service, airs mainly Cantonese and Mandarin Chinese programs as well as weekend shows in the following languages: Cambodian, Filipino, German, Hindi, Hungarian, Italian, Korean, Lao, Macedonian, Polish, Punjabi, Russian, Thai and Vietnamese. CHKT's studios at 151 Esna Park Drive, Unit 26 in Markham.

CHKT is powered at 50,000 watts, the maximum for Canadian AM stations. It uses a directional antenna with a six-tower array, to protect other stations on AM 1430. The transmitter is on one of the Toronto Islands.

Prior to being acquired by Fairchild and becoming a multilingual outlet, the station was best known as CKEY from 1945 to 1991.

== History ==
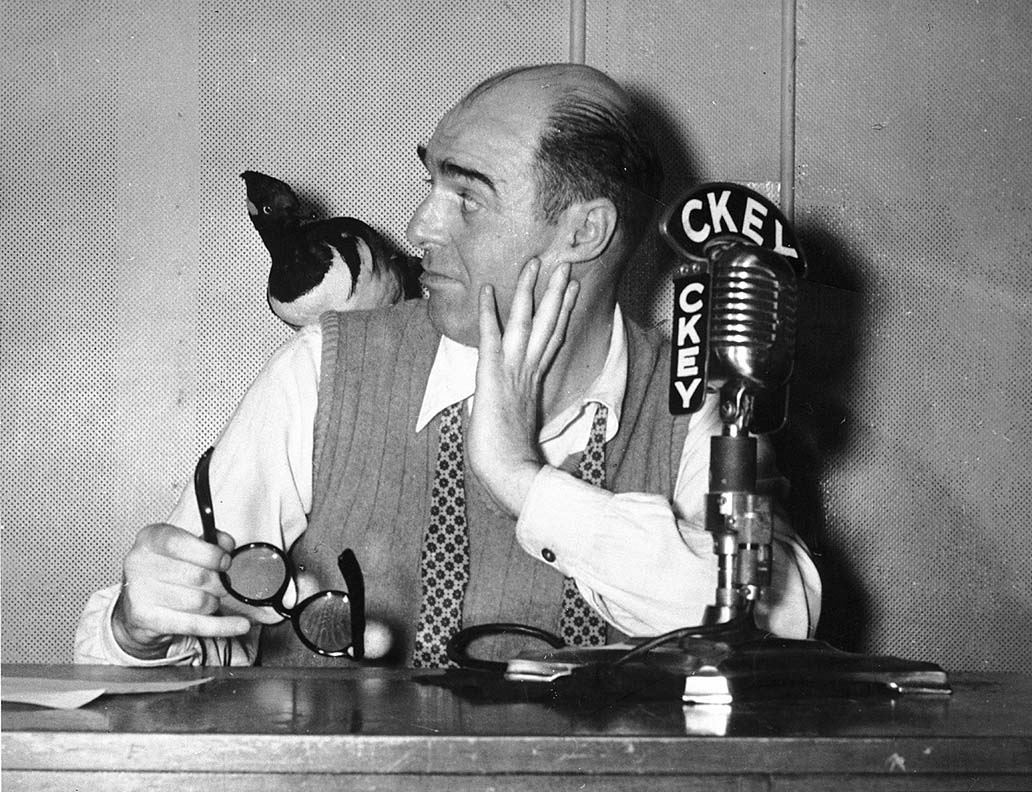
Announcer Mickey Lester at CKEY in 1955

=== CKCL and CKEY ===
The forerunner of CKEY first signed on the air on May 5, 1925. Its call sign was CKCL, broadcasting on 840 kilocycles, and owned by the Dominion Battery Company. As with many radio stations in the early years of radio broadcasting, the station changed frequencies a number of times in its first years of operation. It settled on 580 kHz frequency in 1931.

In 1945, the station was sold to Jack Kent Cooke's Toronto Broadcasting Co., and adopted the call sign CKEY. In the late 1940s, the Toronto tabloid Flash sponsored Flash Weekly's Toronto Merry-Go-Round on CKEY. A 1948 advertisement listed it as airing Sundays from 10:30 to 10:45 p.m. Hosted by Joe Tensee, then editor of Flash, the show featured gossip, interviews and sensationalized news and aired from 1946 to 1954. In January 1950, Toronto Daily Star radio columnist Gordon Sinclair described a late-night appearance by Tensee dealing with nightclubs, gambling and other aspects of city nightlife.

The station was acquired in 1961 by Shoreacres Broadcasting, a consortium that included Westinghouse and The Globe and Mail.

CKEY changed its frequency to 590 in 1964 as CKWW signed-on on 580 that year in Windsor and CKAR, (known today as CFBK-FM), in Huntsville had to change its frequency from 590 to 630 kHz.

=== Top 40 ===
In the late 1950s and early 1960s, CKEY was the leading Top 40 competitor to 1050 CHUM. One of its DJs was later CFNY-FM staple David Marsden, known as Dave Mickie at CKEY (and later at CHUM as well). Another notable broadcaster was Bryan Fustukian, broadcasting as Vik Armen. The station dropped its Top 40 format for middle of the road music in 1965, now going up against CFRB, and was successful in that arena for a time. Shoreacres, in turn, was acquired by Maclean-Hunter in 1966.

A transmitter for CKEY was once located on Midland Avenue and Eglinton Avenue East in Scarborough. This site was sold to the Scarborough Board of Education in 1964 to build Tabor Park Vocational School for the area's redevelopment. From 1972 until the 1990s, CKEY's and then CKYC's offices and studios were located in the Toronto Star building at One Yonge Street.

=== MOR and Oldies ===
From 1970 to 1983, CKEY featured Charles Templeton and Pierre Berton on the commentary show Dialogue with Templeton also reading the morning news for several years. The station also had Stephen Lewis as a commentator in the late 1970s and early 1980s.

Final CKEY logo

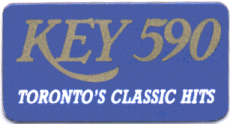
CKEY Key 590 logo

On January 1, 1984, CKEY flipped from its long running MOR format to soft rock/oldies as "Solid Gold CKEY."

On April 25, 1988, the CRTC denied Key Radio Limited and Canada All-News Radio Ltd. permission for CKEY and all-news radio station CKO (99.1 FM) to swap frequencies and bands, a proposal both owners thought would have benefitted their stations as music listeners were increasingly listening to FM while AM was thought better suited for talk and information and was more accessible to commuters as many cars were only equipped with AM receivers. While the CRTC agreed both stations would benefit from trading frequencies, the application was denied due to CKO failing to meet broadcast targets and CKEY asking to reduce its Canadian content requirements.

On June 20, 1988, the station became Key 590, moving from its Soft AC and Oldies mix to all-Oldies, once again competing directly with a re-formatted CHUM.

At 7 p.m. on March 14, 1991, CKEY signed off and began stunting with the sound of a heartbeat. The following morning at 9, the station adopted a country format, changing its call sign to CKYC. The CKEY call sign was subsequently picked up by a station in Fort Erie.

=== Frequency swap ===
After Rogers Communications acquired Maclean-Hunter in 1994, CKYC was sold to Telemedia. Telemedia subsequently swapped CKYC's frequency with that of its sports outlet CJCL. On February 6, 1995, at 10 a.m., CKYC ceased airing country music, and after stunting with a ticking clock for two hours, CJCL and CKYC swapped frequencies.

CKYC subsequently aired only syndicated programming until it went off the air permanently in late 1996.

=== CHKT signs on ===
CHKT was launched as an ethnic, multilingual radio station by Fairchild Group in 1997, over the 1430 AM frequency that had been occupied by CKYC immediately prior to its signing off for the last time. The CKYC call sign was subsequently picked up by a station in Owen Sound in 2001.

Original Fairchild Radio logo, used until 2012.

In October 2019, Fairchild Radio gained public attention when it fired a Toronto radio talk-show host allegedly because of his questions during an interview perceived as critical of the Chinese government's stance on the 2019–20 Hong Kong protests.
