= CKPK-FM =

Radio station in Vancouver

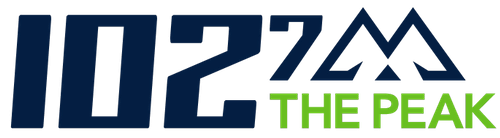
- Vancouver, British Columbia; Canada
- Broadcast area: Greater Vancouver
- Frequency: 102.7 MHz (HD Radio)
- Branding: 102.7 The Peak

Programming
- Format: Modern rock

Ownership
- Owner: Jim Pattison Group; (Jim Pattison Broadcast Group Limited)
- Sister stations: CJJR-FM

History
- First air date: 1923
- Former call signs: CFXC (1923–1926); CJOR (1926–1988); CHRX (1988–1994); CKBD (1994–2008)
- Former frequencies: 440 metres (1923–1925); 1030 kHz (1925–1930); 1210 kHz (1930–1933); 600 kHz (1933–2008); 100.5 MHz (2008–2012)
- Call sign meaning: PK for "Peak"

Technical information
- Licensing authority: CRTC
- Class: C
- ERP: 70,000 watts
- HAAT: 682.4 metres (2,239 ft)
- Transmitter coordinates: 49.3543°N 122.9583°W

Links
- Webcast: Listen Live
- Website: thepeak.fm

CKPK-FM (102.7 MHz) is a commercial radio station in Vancouver, British Columbia, Canada. Owned by Pattison Media, it broadcasts a modern rock format. Its studios are on West 8th Avenue in the Fairview neighbourhood of Vancouver, while its transmitter is located atop Mount Seymour.

The station first signed on with an experimental license in 1923 as CFXC, and was renamed CJOR in 1926. It moved to its long-time home of 600 AM in 1930. CJOR operated as the Vancouver affiliate of the CBC's Dominion Network from 1944 through the network's closure in 1962. It was later acquired by Jim Pattison after the death of its previous owner George Clarke Chandler. In November 2008, after over 80 years as an AM station, the station, adult standards CKBD, moved to FM as adult album alternative (AAA) 100.5 The Peak. In 2012, the station moved once again to 102.7 FM.

== History ==
=== Early years ===
In 1923, the station was originally launched by the electrical store Hume and Rumble as experimental station CFXC. It broadcast on 440 metres with a power of 10 watts. It switched to the frequency of 1030 kilocycles in 1925. The following year, the station was acquired by George Chandler. Under Canadian broadcast policy at the time, CFXC was shut down. A new license was issued to Chandler for CJOR. The station subsequently increased power to 50 watts in 1928 and shared time with CNRV, then moved its frequency to 1210 AM and the studios relocated to 840 Howe Street (with another boost in power to 500 watts) in 1930, and then to 600 in 1933.

CJOR increased its transmission power to 1,000 watts in 1941, moving its transmitter site to Lulu Island. (After the station switched to FM in 2008, CISL moved to the Lulu Island location, making it the oldest broadcasting site in the Vancouver radio market in continuous operation.)

=== CBC Dominion Network ===
In 1944, CJOR became the Vancouver network affiliate of the Canadian Broadcasting Corporation's (CBC) Dominion Network. It increased power again in 1947, this time to 5,000 watts, using two 280-foot towers at a site in Richmond. That same year, Chandler established "CJOR Ltd." to run the station.

In 1961, CJOR further increased power to 10,000 watts, using a three tower array. It became an independent station the following year after CBC ceased the Dominion Network's operations.

=== New ownership ===
Following George Chandler's death in 1964, the Jim Pattison Group acquired the station the following year. The Board of Broadcast Governors (predecessor of the Canadian Radio-television and Telecommunications Commission, or CRTC) had decided not to allow the station parent CJOR Ltd. to renew the license. CJOR Ltd. was then owned by Chandler's widow Marie. The Board of Governors requested that a new buyer for CJOR be found. By the 1970s, the station shifted its focus away from music to talk radio, with such colourful and opinionated personalities as Jack Webster, Pat Burns, and eventually, former British Columbia premier Dave Barrett.

On October 31, 1983, with the pending demolition of the Grosvenor Hotel on Howe Street, CJOR relocated from the hotel's basement to its present studios at 1401 West 8th Avenue. On September 2, 1988, at noon, CJOR dropped its talk radio format, flipping to classic rock under new call letters CHRX. The first song was Bob Seger's "Old Time Rock & Roll". (The former CJOR call sign currently belongs to a radio station in Osoyoos.) The station was very popular during the late 1980s, but started experiencing declining ratings by the early 1990s.

=== Sports and Christian programming ===
To remedy the ratings loss, in 1993, the station added sports talk shows to its programming. However, this did not boost the ratings. On January 7, 1994, at 6 p.m., after signing off with Led Zeppelin's "Stairway to Heaven", the station began stunting with the sound of ocean waves.

On January 9, at noon, it switched formats and call signs again, becoming CKBD with the on-air brand The Bridge as Canada's first Contemporary Christian music station. The first song on "The Bridge" was "Awesome God" by Rich Mullins. On July 31, 1998, the station changed to an adult standards format as 600 AM with the slogan "Unforgettable Adult Favourites".

=== Switch to FM, The Peak ===
On May 30, 2008, CKBD was given approval by the CRTC to move to 100.5 MHz on the FM dial. As part of its move to FM, CKBD planned to switch from adult standards to adult album alternative (AAA) with a new call sign, CKPK-FM. On October 23, 2008, the FM station signed on for testing. The transmitter on 600 AM was shut down on November 13, 2008. The last program was a 25-minute summary of the station's 84-year history on the AM band, followed by "Thanks for the Memory" by Bob Hope. Astral Media's CISL had flipped from oldies to adult standards just days before to take advantage of the move. At 7:20 that same evening, at a live party at the Seasons in the Park restaurant, "100.5 The Peak" launched with U2's "Elevation."

CKPK-FM received a new competitor on Canada Day, 2009, when CHHR-FM began airing a AAA format. CHHR (now CHLG-FM) would change formats to classic hits on June 20, 2014.

==== Move to 102.7 ====
On December 9, 2010, the Jim Pattison Group applied to exchange frequencies with non-commercial community radio station CFRO-FM, which then operated at 102.7 MHz. The application was approved on September 9, 2011. The swap took place almost a year later on September 10, 2012.

During the summer of 2015, CKPK began evolving towards a more modern rock format. Eventually, CKPK began reporting on the Mediabase Canadian alternative rock panel.

=== Now! Radio ===
On July 22, 2022, it was announced that CKPK would drop its rock format on July 25, with its existing Peak format and programming moving to an HD Radio sub-channel and internet radio. Radio Insight reported that Pattison had bought several domain names branded as Now! Radio for the station—implicating a hot adult contemporary "social radio" format modelled after sister stations CKNO-FM in Edmonton, CHNW-FM in Winnipeg, and CKCE-FM in Calgary (which uses a similar positioning as Today Radio) with a focus on topical discussions and listener interactions.

The launch of "Now! Radio" officially occurred at 1:02 p.m. on July 25. The flip came nearly a month after Rogers' CKKS-FM had flipped from hot AC to modern rock on June 30. In January 2023, CKPK laid off The Peak's on-air personalities; the company cited low adoption of HD Radio by local listeners as its reasoning for the cutbacks.

=== Return to The Peak ===
On June 7, 2024, at midnight, almost two years after the flip to Now! Radio, Pattison dropped the format and returned to CKPK's previous Peak branding and modern rock format. The station's two remaining live personalities under Now!—Jaclyn Tatay and Brayden Mack—retained their morning and afternoon shows respectively. Program director Russell James credited the "impressively dedicated" audience that CKPK's Peak digital stream retained as an impetus for the decision.

== Past station logos ==
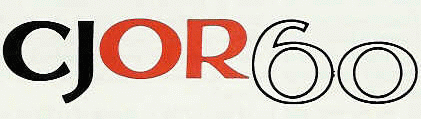
1972 CJOR logo.

The New 600 AM logo in 1998.

600 AM logo from 2008.

100.5 The Peak Logo 2008–2012.

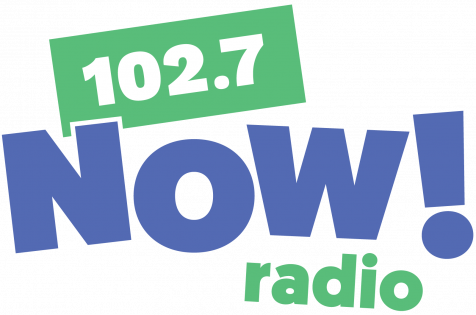
102.7 Now! Radio logo 2022-2024
